= The Naked Gun (2025 film) =

2025 film by Akiva Schaffer

- Theatrical release poster
- Directed by: Akiva Schaffer
- Written by: Dan Gregor; Doug Mand; Akiva Schaffer
- Based on: Police Squad! by: David Zucker; Jim Abrahams; Jerry Zucker
- Produced by: Seth MacFarlane; Erica Huggins
- Starring: Liam Neeson; Pamela Anderson; Paul Walter Hauser; Kevin Durand; Danny Huston
- Cinematography: Brandon Trost
- Edited by: Brian Scott Olds
- Music by: Lorne Balfe
- Production company: Fuzzy Door Productions
- Distributed by: Paramount Pictures
- Release dates: July 28, 2025 (SVA Theater); August 1, 2025 (United States)
- Running time: 85 minutes
- Country: United States
- Language: English
- Budget: $42 million
- Box office: $102.1 million

The Naked Gun is a 2025 American action comedy parody film directed by Akiva Schaffer, who co-wrote the screenplay with Dan Gregor and Doug Mand. The film is the fourth installment in The Naked Gun film series and the sequel to Naked Gun 33⅓: The Final Insult (1994). It stars Liam Neeson in the main role, with Pamela Anderson, Paul Walter Hauser, Kevin Durand and Danny Huston in supporting roles. Its plot follows the son of Lt. Frank Drebin who must succeed in his father's footsteps to prevent the closure of Police Squad.

A fourth Naked Gun film was announced in 2009, as a direct-to-TV sequel starring Leslie Nielsen, reprising his role as Drebin, with Alan Spencer being attached to write. However, the project was cancelled due to financial reasons, with Spencer subsequently departing and Nielsen dying in 2010. After several years of development, including the film being redeveloped as a reboot starring Ed Helms in 2013, it was announced in January 2021 that Seth MacFarlane had been hired to develop the project, and he expressed interest in casting Neeson. Although MacFarlane was hired to direct, Schaffer replaced him after the film was greenlit in October 2022, and Neeson was cast. Anderson was cast in April 2024, and further casting took place the following month, when filming began in Atlanta, Georgia. Filming wrapped that June, with a $42 million budget.

The Naked Gun premiered at the SVA Theater in Manhattan on July 28, 2025, and was released in the United States by Paramount Pictures on August 1, 2025. It received positive reviews from critics and grossed $102 million worldwide.

== Plot ==
Lt. Frank Drebin Jr. of the LAPD Police Squad singlehandedly dispatches a gang of bank robbers while disguised as a schoolgirl. Unbeknownst to him, this was a distraction to steal a gadget called the "P.L.O.T. ("Primordial Law of Toughness") Device" from a safe deposit box. Police Chief Davis reassigns Frank when his over-the-top law enforcement becomes a legal liability. While paying tribute to his late father Frank Drebin Sr., he prays for him to send him a sign of his approval, suggesting an owl as an example.

Frank investigates software engineer Simon Davenport's fatal car crash, deeming it suicide, but notices a matchbook at the scene. Simon's sister Beth, a crime novelist, argues otherwise, but Frank discourages her from investigating further. Frank finds Richard Cane, Simon's wealthy employer at Edentech, at the company's tech expo. After they mutually appreciate the Black Eyed Peas, Cane donates a self-driving electric car to Police Squad—which wreaks havoc in self-driving mode with Frank behind the wheel—and invites Frank to his personal nightclub. Frank notices the matchbook found at Simon's crash site has the same logo as the nightclub.

Cane privately demonstrates how he will use the stolen "P.L.O.T. Device" to revert humans to their primitive nature, culling the population for his fellow billionaires, who will be safely insulated in a bunker. Frank, while interrogating one of the bank robbers, learns about the deposit box, which was Simon's, connecting the two cases. At Cane's club, Beth distracts Cane with improvised scat singing while Frank fights many goons to access security footage, discovering that Simon met discreetly with a journalist. Davis suspends Frank after Cane reveals Frank's activities. Beth stays with the demoralized Frank, and he finally considers moving on from memories of his late wife. Frank and Beth spend a romantic weekend at an alpine lodge. They have a threesome with a magical snowman, but the snowman turns violent after they neglect it, forcing Beth to kill it.

Frank finds the journalist murdered and is easily tricked into incriminating himself. He flees in the electric car, but Cane overrides the controls and attempts to kill Frank just as he did to Simon. Frank blows out the windshield, but is trapped again by the car driving head-on into balloons, bees, and a replacement windshield. He accidentally activates Clippy, who helpfully unlocks the doors. Meanwhile, Police Squad has been decommissioned. Beth reveals that Simon feared the misuse of the "P.L.O.T. Device", but Frank suspects that Beth is using him and angrily leaves her home.

Frank captures Cane's henchman Gustafson and frightens him into confessing to Cane's plan to activate the "P.L.O.T. Device" at the New Year's ball drop at a mixed martial arts match. Frank heads to the match at the "Ponzi-scheme.com Arena", equipped with an earpiece that blocks the "P.L.O.T. Device"'s influence. Beth plans to kill Cane, but he sees this coming as telegraphed in her book. Frank finds the "P.L.O.T. Device" inside the New Year's balls, but he loses his pants as he accidentally activates the lowering mechanism, indecently exposing himself to the entire audience, leading them to not respect his order to evacuate. Cane prematurely activates the "P.L.O.T. Device", and mindless violence erupts throughout the city. Frank fights through innocents by ricocheting ejected handgun magazines, but cannot catch up with Cane, who is escaping on his electric motorbike. His father's spirit arrives as an owl, airlifting Frank and blinding Cane with its excrement. Cane folds in agony after one punch to the gut. Beth arrives, ready to shoot Cane in revenge, but Frank talks her down. Frank and Beth use the "P.L.O.T. Device" to calm the crowd and embrace lovingly as Cane is arrested. In the aftermath, as the credits roll, Frank faces "investigation" by "Internal Affairs"—actually the name of a tropical resort, where he spends his time with Beth.

In a post-credits scene, "Weird Al" Yankovic attempts to perform a show in Cane's bunker, only to find it completely empty, and gets frustrated and confused in the process.

== Cast ==
- Liam Neeson as Lt. Frank Drebin Jr.
- Pamela Anderson as Beth Davenport
- Paul Walter Hauser as Capt. Ed Hocken Jr.
- Danny Huston as Richard Cane
- CCH Pounder as Chief Davis
- Kevin Durand as Sig Gustafson
- Liza Koshy as Det. Barnes
- Eddie Yu as Det. Park
- Moses Jones as "Not Nordberg Jr."
- Cody Rhodes as bartender
- Busta Rhymes as bank robber

Jon Anik, Dave Bautista, Michael Bisping, Bruce Buffer, John McCarthy, and "Weird Al" Yankovic all appear as themselves; Yankovic had previously made cameo appearances in all three of the preceding films in the franchise. MMA fighters Justin Gaethje and Kamaru Usman appear as fighters in the film's "WWFC" event scene. Priscilla Presley makes a cameo appearance reprising her role as Jane Spencer-Drebin, the wife of the late Frank Drebin and the mother of Frank Drebin Jr.

== Production ==
=== Cancelled attempt with Leslie Nielsen ===
Although 33 1/3: The Final Insult (1994) was intended to be the final installment in the Naked Gun franchise, in 2009, it was revealed that a fourth film starring Leslie Nielsen was planned as a direct-to-TV sequel, titled The Naked Gun: What 4? The Rhythm of Evil. The script followed the story of Frank training a young rookie, but due to financial reasons, it was canceled in 2009. It was written by Alan Spencer, who said he signed on to write the film as a "rescue mission" to save an inferior sequel from happening, and impressed Paramount executives and online reviewers so much that it was briefly shifted to the theatrical department, while the Zucker-Abrahams-Zucker team, original writers of the saga, tried to stop it from happening.

Spencer wrote a sizable role for Nielsen, who would be passing the torch to a new generation of incompetent police, but Paramount asked him to reduce the part to a cameo for budgetary reasons, and later decided to remove his character altogether. After this last request, Spencer left the project. Nielsen died in November 2010.

=== First development with Ed Helms ===
In December 2013, Paramount Pictures revealed that a reboot of The Naked Gun franchise was in development with Ed Helms cast in the role of Frank Drebin, while the script was being co-written by Thomas Lennon and Robert Ben Garant. By January 2014, Garant revealed that the working title of the project was Episode IV: A New Hope, while announcing that it was intended to be a sequel to the original films. Helms was intended to portray a character that introduces himself as "Frank Drebin, no relation" so that the movie can introduce a new protagonist without contradicting what came before. In March 2015, David Zucker stated that he was offered a producing role on the project, but had declined to be involved because he felt like it would differ in comedic style and ultimately be inferior to his original films. In August 2015, Helms confirmed that the script was still being written, while acknowledging the concerns that Zucker had with modern-day audience reception, and a need for something other than the spoof genre of the previous movies.

=== Second development with David Zucker and Pat Proft ===
By March 2017, a re-write of the script was being completed by David Zucker and Pat Proft, with the plot being reworked to feature the son of Frank Drebin, who would have been a secret agent rather than a policeman. The script was originally titled The Naked Gun 444 1/4: Nordberg Did It, but was later renamed Naked: Impossible, parodying the Mission: Impossible, Bourne and Daniel Craig James Bond franchises. Zucker felt that "they don't make cop movies anymore. When you do parody, you've got to spoof something current." According to Zucker, Jon Gonda at Paramount liked the script, written by him and Pat Proft that was presented to the studio in 2018, but that somewhere along the line the studio decided not to go with it. Zucker also said that he went on a meeting with Paramount in around 2019, where a female head of production complained over a "mild" joke about a "police officer having to adjust her Kevlar vest or have a breast reduction". He explained saying that a "stupid, mild joke" was too much for them [Paramount].

=== Third development with Seth MacFarlane ===
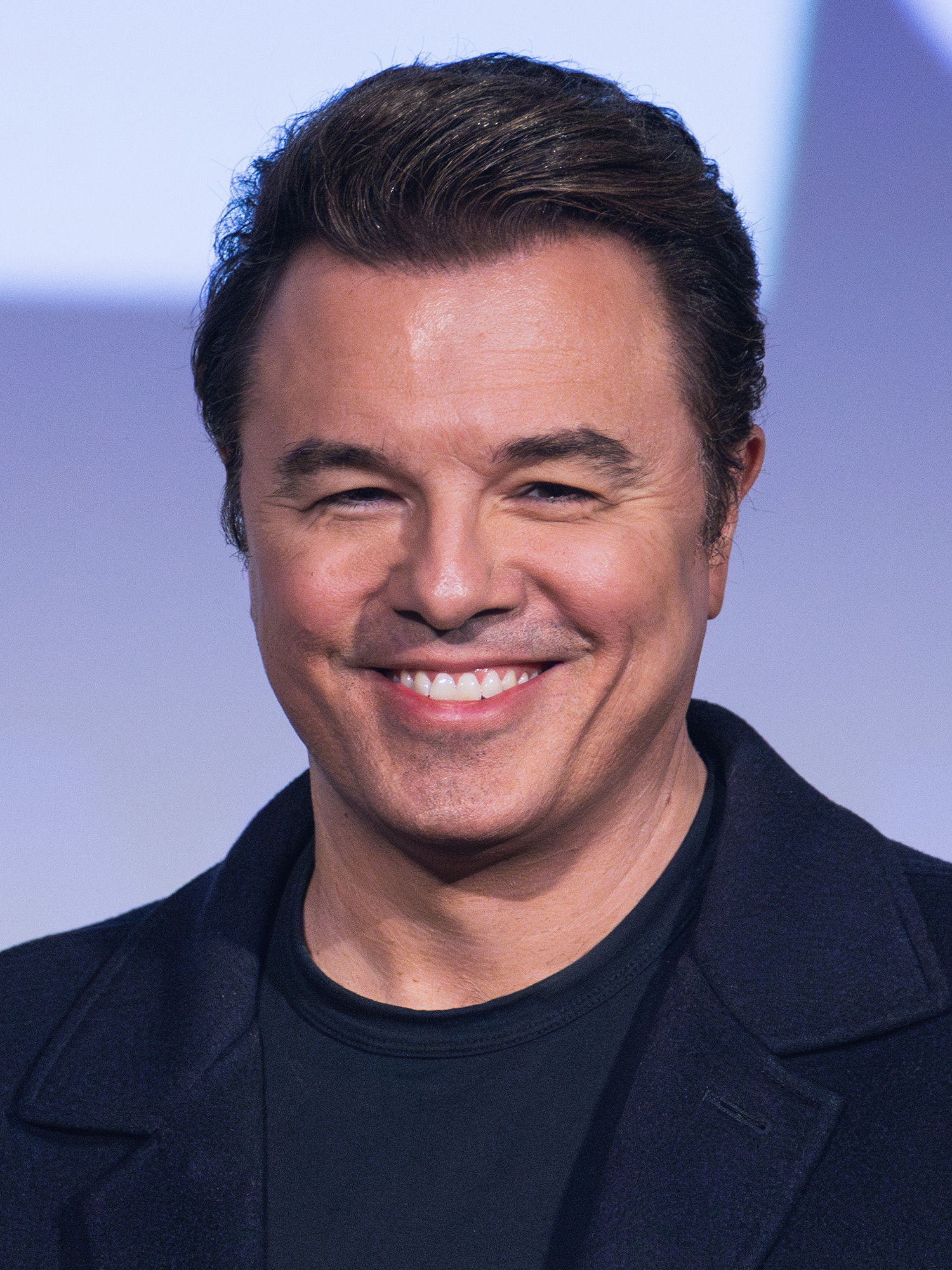
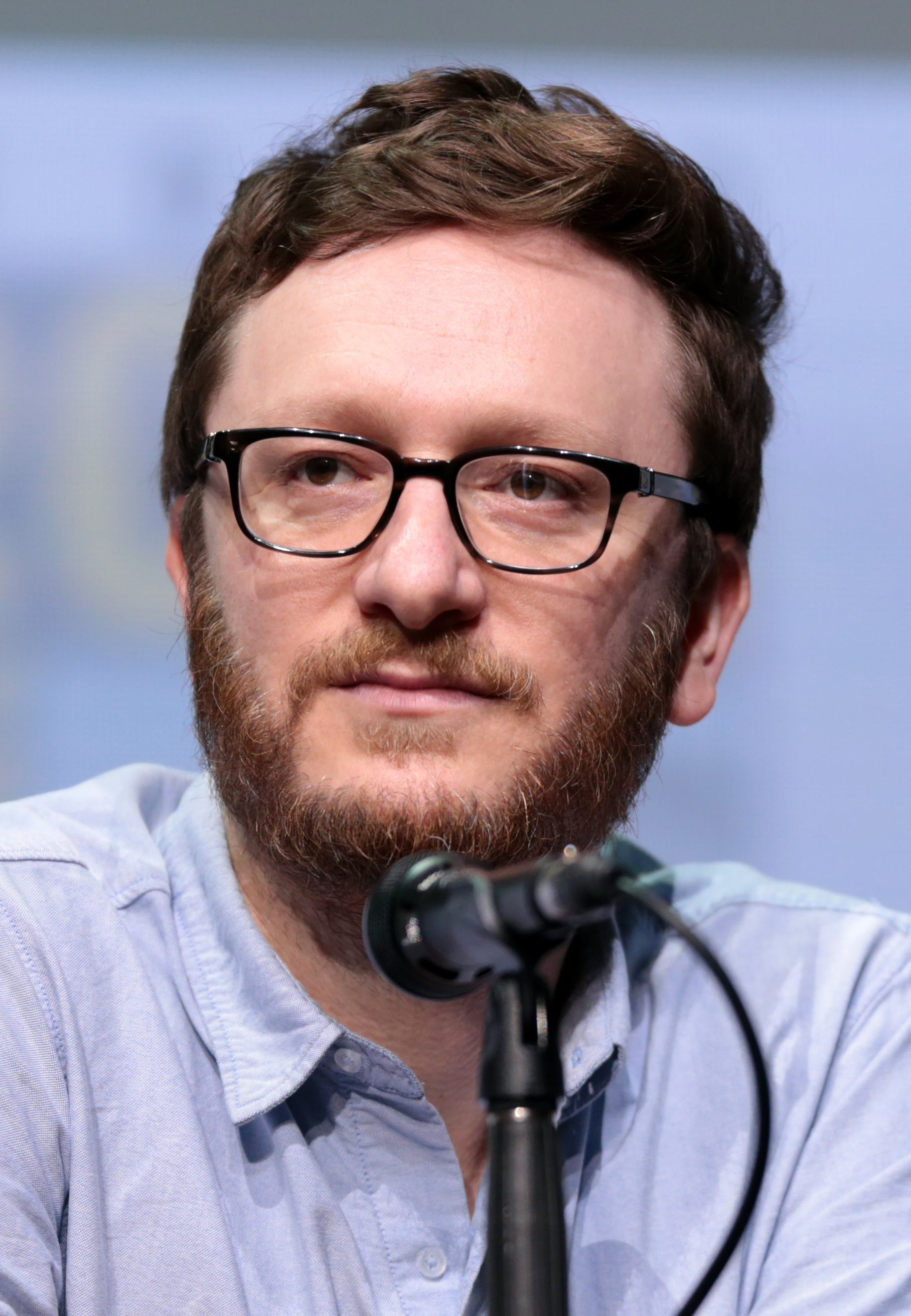
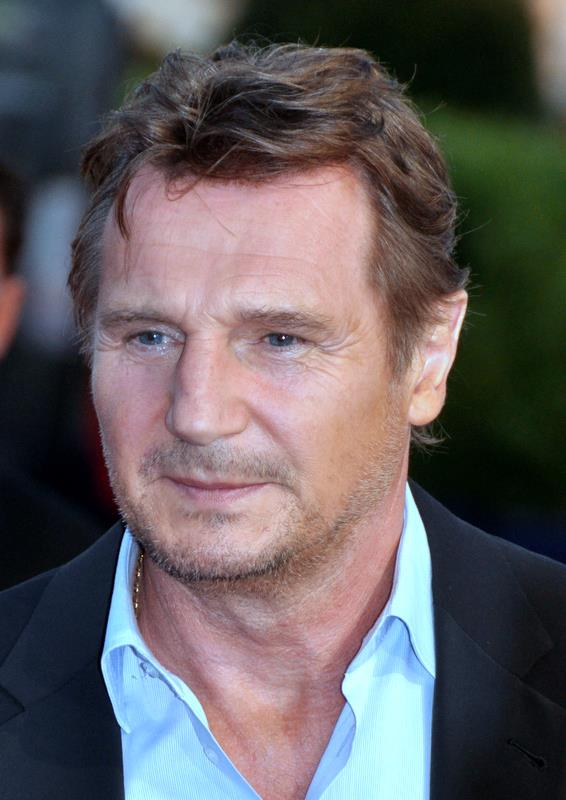
Producer Seth MacFarlane, director Akiva Schaffer, and star Liam Neeson

In January 2021, it was revealed that Seth MacFarlane had been hired to further develop the project. After MacFarlane had previously expressed interest in casting Liam Neeson as Frank Drebin Jr. in 2015, he was hired by the studio. MacFarlane and Paramount approached Neeson with a pitch to star in the movie. In June, Neeson said MacFarlane was working on a new draft of the script, with the studio additionally negotiating his potential role as director. He expressed excitement at the opportunity to explore a more comedic role should he decide to star in the movie, while saying that development on the project was ongoing. In February 2022, Neeson again confirmed that Paramount was still courting him to star in the legacy sequel.

In October 2022, the film was greenlit with Neeson in the lead role as Frank Drebin Jr. and Akiva Schaffer directing. Dan Gregor and Doug Mand were hired to write a new draft of the script from a previous draft with contributions from Mark Hentemann and Alec Sulkin. In December 2024, it was determined by the Writers Guild of America that Gregor, Mand, and Schaffer would be credited on the screenplay while Hentemann, MacFarlane, and Sulkin contributed additional literary material. MacFarlane and Erica Huggins served as producers, under their production company Fuzzy Door Productions, with Domain Entertainment providing additional funding. Zucker was again offered a credit on the film, as an executive producer, but he declined, saying he did not wish to claim credit for a project he was not involved with. Zucker said after the film's release that he had no intention of watching it (as was standard procedure for him regarding sequels to his work), but was pleased it was a success and was on good terms with the director and writing crew. He had declined to get involved in the film mainly because he believed he would have done the film differently.

In April 2024, Pamela Anderson joined the cast. Anderson was originally offered the role of Tanya Peters in The Final Insult before the role eventually went to Anna Nicole Smith. In May, Paul Walter Hauser joined the cast, playing Capt. Ed Hocken, alongside Kevin Durand in an undisclosed villain role, as well as Danny Huston, Liza Koshy, Cody Rhodes, CCH Pounder and Busta Rhymes.

=== Filming ===
Principal photography began on May 6, 2024, in Atlanta under the working title Law of Toughness, and had wrapped on June 28.

== Release ==
=== Theatrical ===
The Naked Gun premiered at the SVA Theater in New York on July 28, 2025, and was released in the United States on August 1, 2025. It was originally scheduled for July 18, 2025.

=== Home media and streaming ===
The film was made available on VOD by Paramount Home Entertainment; first on September 30, 2025, as a purchasable digital item, and later on October 14, as available to be rented. It was released domestically on 4K Ultra HD Blu-ray, Blu-ray, and DVD on November 10.

The Naked Gun was added to the streaming platform Prime Video on December 29, 2025. According to streaming analytics FlixPatrol, which measures the popularity of titles on various streaming services, The Naked Gun emerged as a massive streaming hit as it went on to reach the No. 1 position on the Prime Video charts within the first few weeks of its release.

== Reception ==
=== Box office ===
The Naked Gun grossed $52.6 million in the United States and Canada, and $49.5 million in other territories, for a worldwide total of $102.1 million.

In the United States and Canada, the film was released alongside The Bad Guys 2, and was projected to gross around $15 million from 3,344 theaters in its opening weekend. It grossed $6.3 million on its first day, including $1.6 million from Thursday previews. It went on to open to $16.8 million, finishing in third behind holdover The Fantastic Four: First Steps and The Bad Guys 2.

=== Critical response ===
On the review aggregator website Rotten Tomatoes, 88% of 338 critics' reviews are positive, with an average rating of 7.3/10. The website's consensus reads: "With Liam Neeson's gravelly gravitas proving to be a perfect fit for Frank Drebin's deadpan buffoonery, The Naked Gun revives the original trilogy's daffy sense of humor like it never went out of style." Metacritic, which uses a weighted average, assigned the film a score of 75 out of 100, based on 48 critics, indicating "generally favorable" reviews. Audiences polled by CinemaScore gave the film an average grade of "A–" on an A+ to F scale.

Hanna Flint of Time Out gave the film a perfect five stars out of five rating, writing, "In the thick of reboot culture, The Naked Gun is a prime example of filmmakers taking a nostalgic piece of cinema and making good on its legacy. It honours the humour above all, and you'd be hard-pushed to find a funnier film this year."

IndieWire's David Ehrlich awarded the film a B+ grade, writing, "That's a delicate tango in the context of an increasingly rare studio movie that exists for no other purpose than to make people laugh, but it's one this hilarious new take on the old ZAZ masterpiece pulls off with a rose between its teeth."

Peter Bradshaw of The Guardian gave the film four out of five stars, writing, "[Neeson] deadpans it impeccably, but perhaps doesn't quite have Nielsen's eerie innocence. In any case, it doesn't stop this reboot of the Naked Gun franchise from being a lot of fun. It is a life-support system for some outrageous gags."

=== Accolades ===
Award	Date of ceremony	Category	Recipient(s)	Result	Ref.
Artios Awards	February 26, 2026	Feature: Big Budget: Comedy	Carmen Cuba; Judith Sunga (associate casting director); Tara Feldstein Bennett and Chase Paris (location casting directors)	Nominated	
Critics' Choice Awards	January 4, 2026	Best Comedy	The Naked Gun	Won	
Critics' Choice Super Awards	August 6, 2026	Best Action Movie	The Naked Gun	Nominated	
Critics' Choice Super Awards	August 6, 2026	Best Actress in an Action Movie	Pamela Anderson	Nominated	
Georgia Film Critics Association	December 27, 2025	Oglethorpe Award for Excellence in Georgia Cinema	The Naked Gun	Nominated	
Golden Tomato Awards	January 13, 2026	Best Comedy Movie	The Naked Gun	Won	
Golden Trailer Awards	May 28, 2026	Most Innovative Advertising for a Feature Film	Save PSA (Paramount Pictures / Aspect)	Won	
International Film Music Critics Association	February 26, 2026	Best Original Score for a Comedy Film	Lorne Balfe	Nominated	
Las Vegas Film Critics Society	December 19, 2025	Best Comedy Movie	The Naked Gun	Nominated	
Make-Up Artists & Hair Stylists Guild	February 14, 2026	Best Contemporary Hair Styling (Feature-Length Motion Picture)	Joyce M. Gilliard, Nadia Sobh, and Tomica Sarver	Nominated	
San Diego Film Critics Society	December 15, 2025	Best Comedic Performance	Liam Neeson	Nominated	
Satellite Awards	March 10, 2026	Best Actor in a Motion Picture – Comedy or Musical	Liam Neeson	Nominated	
St. Louis Film Critics Association	December 14, 2025	Best Comedy Film	The Naked Gun	Won	
Taurus World Stunt Awards	February 22, 2026	Hardest Hit	Yediel Quiles	Nominated	

== Future ==
In August 2025, when asked about the possibility of a sequel to the reboot, Neeson said that he believes the film is a "one-off". However, producer Erica Huggins later said that the actors, writers, and producers were discussing a sequel. In January 2026, Schaffer said that they were not planning on doing another film, citing the recent changes in ownership at Paramount, stating that they were still waiting on hearing from the studio if they would want a sequel. Schaffer added that screenwriters Dan Gregor and Doug Mand had a list of gags for a sequel and that a "big idea" had been floating around for a plot subject. In February 2026, Neeson said that he had not been approached for a sequel, but said that he would become involved if the "script is good" and if Anderson and Huston were available. In March 2026, MacFarlane weighed in on the chances for a potential sequel, saying, "I know everyone would love to, including Liam. We have not heard anything yet. I think it's all up to Paramount."
