= Parody film =

Film genre

A parody film or spoof film is a subgenre of comedy film that lampoons other film genres or films as pastiches, works created by imitation of the style of many different films reassembled together. Although the subgenre is often overlooked by critics, parody films are commonly profitable at the box office. Parody is related to satire, except that "parody is more often a representation of appreciation, while a satire is more often...pointing ...out the major flaws of an object through ridicule." J.M. Maher notes that the "difference is not always clear" and points out that "some films employ both techniques". Parody is found in a range of art and culture, including literature, music, theater, television, animation, and gaming.

== History ==
The first film parody was The Little Train Robbery (1905), which makes fun of The Great Train Robbery (1903), in part by using an all-child cast for the Western spoof. Historically, when a genre formula grows tired, as in the case of the moralistic melodramas in the 1910s, it retains value only as a parody, as demonstrated by Buster Keaton shorts that mocked that melodrama genre.

In the 2000s, the increasing availability of digital cameras (and then smartphones) that could shoot video and accessible editing software made it possible for amateur and early-stage professional creators to make parodies and post them online.

== Popular figures ==
Influential parody actors and creators from the first half of the 20th century included the Marx Brothers (active 1905–1949), W. C. Fields (active 1898–1946), Mae West (active 1907–1978), Laurel and Hardy (active 1927–1955), and Bob Hope (active 1922–1999). The 1970s and 1980s have been called the "golden age" of parody movies, led by Mel Brooks and the "ZAZ trio" (David Zucker, Jim Abrahams, and Jerry Zucker). Brooks' parodies included a Western parody, Blazing Saddles (1974); a horror parody, Young Frankenstein (1974); and a space opera parody, Spaceballs (1987). The ZAZ trio is best known for their film which parodies a number of 1960s and 1970s genres (from exploitation film to kung fu film), The Kentucky Fried Movie (1977) and their air disaster film parody, Airplane! (1980). Woody Allen also contributed several parodies.
