= A Substantial Gift (The Broken Promise) =

- Police Squad! episode
- Frank discovers who Sally really is
- Episode no.: Season 1 Episode 1
- Directed by: Jim Abrahams; David Zucker; Jerry Zucker
- Written by: Jim Abrahams; David Zucker; Jerry Zucker
- Original air date: March 4, 1982

Guest appearances
- Lorne Greene (special guest star); Barbara Tarbuck as Mrs. Twice; Terry Wills as Jim Johnson; Terrence Beasor as Dr. Robert Zubatsky; Russell Shannon as Ralph Twice; Jimmy Briscoe as Cop; Kathryn Leigh Scott as Sally Decker

Episode chronology
← Previous —	Next → "Ring of Fear (A Dangerous Assignment)"

"A Substantial Gift (The Broken Promise)" is the first episode of the television series Police Squad!. It was written and directed by Jim Abrahams, David Zucker and Jerry Zucker.

== Plot ==
The episode starts inside the office of the Acme Credit Union. A young credit union teller named Sally Decker is arguing with her boss, Jim Johnson, over a loan of money to pay a debt to her orthodontist. Johnson declines, saying that due to an upcoming audit, he has to balance the credit union's books and can't loan her any more money. The argument ends as customer Ralph Twice, recently laid off from the Lorman Tire Company, arrives to cash his last payroll check. Sally devises an impromptu scheme to solve her money problems: she shoots Twice and Johnson, making it look like Twice was trying to rob the credit union by planting a gun on him. She pilfers the cash drawer and then begins screaming to attract attention.

Frank Drebin arrives at the credit union, and inquires of his boss, Ed Hocken, about the case. Ed tells Frank that the alleged robber, Ralph Twice, is a good family man with no prior record. They both question Sally, who makes a really complicated statement in which she claims that Twice shot Johnson and she then shot Twice. As Frank and Ed depart, Sally believes that they have bought her story.

Frank goes to see scientist Ted Olson at the Police Squad crime lab. Ted tells Frank that if the shooter stood where Sally said, the bullet which killed Johnson should have penetrated deeper. Ed and Frank go to a neighborhood in the city called Little Italy to question Ralph Twice's widow, who is unable to provide them with any clues. The next morning at the Police Squad office, Ed and Frank receive the forensics reports, which contradict Sally's version of the events, suggesting that the shooter was really much further away from the victims than she claimed.

=== Act II: Yankees One ===
Act II: Yankees One

Frank tries to discover the position in which Twice and Johnson stood, by using real men as test subjects and firing real guns. After several hours of trying, Frank has nothing conclusive (other than a pile of dead bodies). To get answers, Frank visits Johnny the shoe-shinner and police informant, who tells Frank that Twice would have gotten his job back in two weeks anyway, while Sally got mixed up in penny-ante bunko scams. Frank visits Sally's former boyfriend Joe Surlow, who leads Frank to Dr. Zubatski, the orthodontist who treated Sally. Visiting Zubatski, Frank learns that Sally was chronically in arrears with her payments to Zubatski, but that she paid him in full the day after the credit union holdup.

Setting up a final confrontation, Frank calls Sally pretending that he is Zubatski, and threatening her with blackmail, arranges a meeting. When Sally sees Frank, she tries to leave, but Frank tells her that he has discovered that next to her robbery scam, she has in the past undertaken other shady jobs using a number of aliases, pulling several wigs off her head to prove his point. Exposed, Sally starts a shootout with Frank, which alternates into throwing guns at each other once they run out of ammunition. Sally ultimately attempts to flee, but Ed arrives to arrest her.

== Recurring jokes ==
- Tonight's special guest star: Lorne Greene, wearing a trench coat, is thrown from a speeding car. He lands on the ground, then rolls over, wincing in pain and clutching his chest where a knife handle is protruding. He promptly expires in Police Squad! guest star fashion, setting the precedent for the immediate death of all special guest stars in the series.
- Next week's experiment: Some interesting experiments involving discarded swimwear.
- Johnny's next customer: A priest wanting information on life after death.
- Freeze frame gag: Frank and Ed laugh over a joke, and struggle to maintain the awkward poses as the credits roll.

== Notes ==
- In its initial airing on ABC, Drebin could be seen walking in front of a home made banner greeting "Howard, Frank, and Dandy Don"—mimicking similar banners seen greeting the broadcasters on ABC's Monday Night Football. Syndicated reruns and video releases omitted the banner.
- The exposed design of the teller's cage is a sight gag reminiscent of the toll booth scene in Blazing Saddles.
- Sally's statement of the alleged robbery attempt is conducted in the manner of Abbott and Costello's "Who's on First?" routine.
- The wig in the face gag was reused in the first two Naked Gun movies, and the close distance shootout scene also appeared in the second movie.

== Reception ==
The New York Times largely praised the episode in its preview/review, with many praising the episode's writing.
