= Ring of Fear =

Ring of Fear may refer to:

- Ring of Fear (film), a 1954 murder mystery starring Mickey Spillane and Clyde Beatty
- "Ring of Fear" (A Dangerous Assignment), an episode of TV show Police Squad!
- Ring of Fear, a 1971 Anne McCaffrey romance novel
