= The Naked Gun: From the Files of Police Squad! =

1988 film directed by David Zucker

- Theatrical release poster
- Directed by: David Zucker
- Written by: Jerry Zucker; Jim Abrahams; David Zucker; Pat Proft
- Based on: Police Squad! (1982 television series) by: David Zucker; Jim Abrahams; Jerry Zucker
- Produced by: Robert K. Weiss
- Starring: Leslie Nielsen
- Cinematography: Robert Stevens
- Edited by: Michael Jablow
- Music by: Ira Newborn
- Production company: Paramount Pictures
- Distributed by: Paramount Pictures
- Release date: December 2, 1988
- Running time: 85 minutes
- Country: United States
- Language: English
- Budget: $14.5 million
- Box office: $152.4 million

The Naked Gun: From the Files of Police Squad! is a 1988 American crime comedy film directed by David Zucker, and produced and released by Paramount Pictures. The film stars Leslie Nielsen as the bumbling police Lt. Frank Drebin.

The film features fast-paced slapstick comedy, including many visual and verbal puns and gags. The film is based on the character portrayed by Nielsen in the television series Police Squad!, and is also a continuation of the latter. The core creative team behind Police Squad! and the film series includes the team of David Zucker, Jim Abrahams, and Jerry Zucker (ZAZ) as well as Pat Proft in varying combinations.

Released on December 2, 1988, The Naked Gun was a critical and commercial success, which led to two sequels: The Naked Gun 2½: The Smell of Fear (1991) and Naked Gun 33⅓: The Final Insult (1994). It is now considered one of the greatest comedy films of all time. A fourth film, a legacy sequel directed and co-written by Akiva Schaffer and starring Liam Neeson and Pamela Anderson, was released in 2025.

== Plot ==
Police Squad Lieutenant Frank Drebin is on vacation in Beirut when he disrupts a conference of the United States' greatest enemies (Idi Amin, Muammar Gaddafi, Ayatollah Khomeini, Yasser Arafat, Fidel Castro, and Mikhail Gorbachev) who are trying to conceive a terrorist plan to humiliate the U.S.

In Los Angeles, Officer Nordberg attempts to bust a heroin operation run by businessman Vincent Ludwig but is shot by Ludwig's henchmen. Drebin returns to Los Angeles and is briefed on the case before visiting him in the hospital. Nordberg provides cryptic clues, including a picture of Ludwig's ship on which the deal had been organized. Frank also learns that Nordberg's jacket tested positive for heroin.

Police Squad is put in charge of security for the impending visit of Queen Elizabeth II to Los Angeles, so Captain Ed Hocken gives Drebin 24 hours to clear Nordberg before word gets out and detracts from the Queen's visit. When Drebin visits Ludwig to inquire about the ship he inadvertently reveals that Nordberg is still alive.

Ludwig asks his assistant Jane, who is unaware of Ludwig's criminal activities, to get close to Drebin to see what he knows. She provides Drebin with the information he requested and they begin to fall in love. Ludwig meets with Pahpshmir, from the Beirut meeting, to discuss an assassination plot against the Queen. Ludwig agrees to do it for $20 million and explains that he will use a beeper that uses post-hypnotic suggestion to make anyone an unwitting assassin.

Ludwig attempts to have Nordberg killed at the hospital by hypnotizing his doctor, but Drebin successfully protects him. The doctor is killed in a comical fashion before Drebin can interrogate him.

Drebin then breaks into Ludwig's office to search for evidence. He finds a note from Pahpshmir to Ludwig which confirms his suspicions, but accidentally starts a fire that destroys the note and the office. Drebin later confronts Ludwig with his allegations at a reception for the Queen's arrival. He misinterprets Ludwig's presentation of a musket to the Queen as an attack and tries to protect her, but only causes more of a problem and is fired from Police Squad. Jane finds out the plan will be executed at a baseball game at Anaheim Stadium and that one of the players will perform the act. She informs Drebin of the plan, but he is forced to sneak into the game in disguise.

Police Squad arrives at the stadium after Drebin tells them about the plot. Drebin knocks the home plate umpire out and takes his place in order to frisk the players for weapons while they are at bat. Ludwig eventually activates his unwitting assassin, Reggie Jackson, using the hypnotic beeper. Jane alerts Drebin, who chases after Jackson and tackles him, causing a bench-clearing brawl that allows Jackson to escape.

Ludwig holds Jane at gunpoint and begins to leave the stadium while the hypnotized Jackson takes aim at the Queen. Drebin tries to tranquilize Jackson, but misses and hits a woman on the upper deck. She falls over the railing and lands on Jackson, crushing him and saving the Queen's life.

Drebin follows Ludwig to the top of the stadium and shoots him with another dart. Ludwig fatally plummets over the side of the stadium and lands on the concrete, and is struck by a passing bus, run over and flattened by a steamroller, and finally trampled by the USC marching band. Some of the band members inadvertently step on Ludwig's beeper, triggering Jane to attempt to kill Drebin. He breaks Jane's hypnosis by openly professing his feelings for her and giving her an engagement ring.

Drebin is reinstated to Police Squad and a recovered Nordberg congratulates him. However, Drebin accidentally pushes Nordberg's wheelchair down the stadium stairs and launches him onto the field.

== Cast ==
- Leslie Nielsen as Lt. Frank Drebin
- Priscilla Presley as Jane Spencer
- George Kennedy as Capt. Ed Hocken
- Ricardo Montalbán as Vincent Ludwig
- O. J. Simpson as Det. Nordberg
- Raye Birk as Pahpshmir
- Susan Beaubian as Mrs. Wilma Nordberg
- Nancy Marchand as Mayor Lillian Barkley
- Jeannette Charles as Queen Elizabeth II
- Ed Williams as Ted Olsen
- Tiny Ron as Al
- Winifred Freedman as Stephanie
- Joe Grifasi as Pier 32 Dockman
- Tony Brafa as Enrico Pallazzo
- Nicholas Worth as Thug #1
- Reggie Jackson as Angels Right Fielder
- Lawrence Tierney as the Angels Manager

Major League Baseball (MLB) player Jay Johnstone and umpires Joe West (NL), Doug Harvey (NL), Hank Robinson, Ken Kaiser (AL), and Ron Luciano (AL) have cameos. Professional announcers Curt Gowdy, Jim Palmer, Tim McCarver, Mel Allen, Dick Enberg, and Dick Vitale appear as play-by-play commentators, with Dr. Joyce Brothers in a cameo role as herself.

"Weird Al" Yankovic cameos as himself, and would make similar appearances in the film's sequels. An uncredited John Houseman appears as a driving teacher. Houseman died in October 1988, making this a posthumous appearance and his final film role.

== Production ==
After the success of Airplane!, ZAZ had looked to doing another spoof comedy as a movie, using the series M Squad as its basis. Initially they could not come up with a plot, so Paramount's Michael Eisner had set them up with a six-episode television deal despite their desire to make a film. The series, Police Squad was cancelled at the end of the contract. ZAZ continued to make films including Top Secret! and Ruthless People, but still wanted to come back to spoof comedy. Working from their Police Squad concept, they found adding a romance to the story helped to establish an overall plot, and the film was quickly greenlit by Paramount. They worked backwards in writing the film, establishing the plot to assassinate the Queen among the love affair, which established the Queen visiting the United States for the baseball game and setting the rest of the film elements in place.

As with Airplane!, ZAZ wanted to cast actors that had not done comedy roles before, wanting them to play their roles straight against Nielsen's approach of acting as if he was not in a comedy; this allowed them to produce the film around dramatic timing rather than comedic timing to pull off its humor. Their approach led them to select Presley and Simpson. Bo Derek had been their original pick for Presley's role, but she turned it down. Ricardo Montalbán was chosen by the producers to play the villain after being included on a list of names assembled by the people in charge of casting the film. The Zucker brothers had seen his performance in Star Trek II: The Wrath of Khan. Yankovic's cameo came about as he was a fan of Airplane! and Top Secret!, and also good friends with producer Bob Weiss. Jeanette Charles, who portrayed Queen Elizabeth II, later recalled Nielsen and Presley were "charming" but Simpson was "rude".

The film was shot at various locations in and around Los Angeles. Principal photography was from February 22 to May 6, 1988. The baseball matchup between the California Angels and Seattle Mariners was not originally planned. Being Wisconsin natives, the Zuckers and Abrahams made a request to MLB to allow them to use the Milwaukee Brewers as one of the teams but was recommended the Mariners instead because MLB wanted to promote the then "really weak franchise". Minnesota native Proft's attempt to make that team the Twins was rejected by the ballclub. The Mariners' opponent was supposed to have been the Los Angeles Dodgers who, despite its willingness to allow Dodger Stadium to be used for filming, refused to be mentioned in the film because of its objection to the bench-clearing brawl scene. Needing a home team based in Greater Los Angeles which was the film's setting, the writers successfully settled for the Angels.

Following previews, 20 minutes of film was cut.

== Reception ==
=== Box office ===
The film was released on December 2, 1988, and on its opening weekend, finished in first place at the box office in the United States and Canada, grossing $9.3 million. In its second weekend, it grossed $6.1 million, falling to second place behind the newly released Twins ($11.2 million). The film went on to gross $78.8 million at the United States and Canada box office and $73.7 million overseas for a worldwide total of $152.5 million.

=== Critical response ===
Upon its initial release, The Naked Gun: From the Files of Police Squad! received critical acclaim, and it has since been regarded as one of the greatest comedy films of all time. On Rotten Tomatoes, the film has a rating of 88%, based on 144 reviews. The site's critical consensus reads, "The Naked Gun: From the Files of Police Squad! is loaded chock full of gags that are goofy, unapologetically crass, and ultimately hilarious." On Metacritic, the film has a score of 76 out of 100, based on 13 critics, indicating "generally favorable" reviews. Audiences polled by CinemaScore gave the film an average grade of "A−" on an A+ to F scale. Roger Ebert of the Chicago Sun-Times gave the film three-and-a-half stars (out of four), and said: "The movie is as funny, let it be said, as any comedy released this year ... You laugh, and then you laugh at yourself for laughing." It was voted the 14th best comedy of all time in a Channel 4 poll. The film was selected by The New York Times as one of "The Best 1,000 Movies Ever Made". It was named the 7th Funniest Comedy Ever on a poll by Empire.

== See also ==
- Telefon – 1977 spy film
