= The Naked Gun =

American crime comedy film series

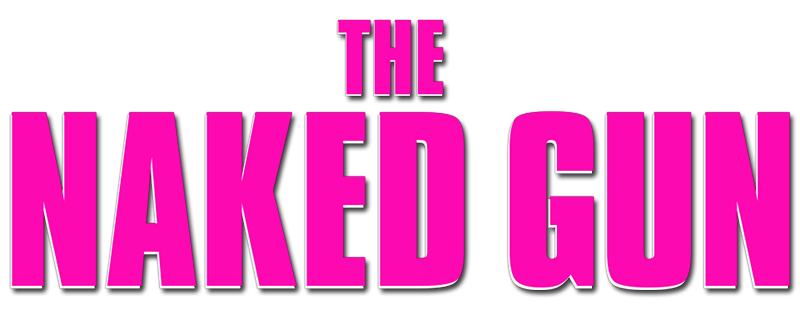
- Created by: Zucker, Abrahams and Zucker
- Original work: Police Squad! (1982)
- Owners: Paramount Pictures (Skydance)
- Years: 1982–present

Films and television
- Films: The Naked Gun: From the Files of Police Squad! (1988); The Naked Gun 2½: The Smell of Fear (1991); Naked Gun 33⅓: The Final Insult (1994); The Naked Gun (2025)
- Television series: Police Squad! (1982)

Games
- Video game: The Naked Gun: ICUP (2012)

The Naked Gun is a media franchise based on the TV show Police Squad!, consisting of American crime spoof-slapstick comedy films, created by the comedy filmmaking trio Zucker, Abrahams and Zucker. It includes one television series, four theatrical films and a video game. The series centers on a bumbling police detective who solves criminal cases in comical fashion. Leslie Nielsen stars in the television series and the first three films as the protagonist Detective Lieutenant Frank Drebin; a fourth film starring Liam Neeson as Frank Drebin Jr. was released in 2025. Critics have praised the TV series and the films, all four of which have been financially successful.

== Television ==
=== Police Squad! (1982) ===
Police Squad! is an American crime parody television series that was broadcast on ABC in 1982. The series starred Leslie Nielsen as Franklin "Frank" Drebin, and was co-created and written by David Zucker, Jim Abrahams, and Jerry Zucker. Parodying police procedurals, the series featured the use of sight gags, wordplay and non sequiturs. Although the show was canceled after six episodes, it was later followed by the successful Naked Gun film series, and in 2013 TV Guide ranked it #7 on its list of 60 shows that were "Cancelled Too Soon".

== Film ==
Title	U.S. release date	Director	Writers	Producer(s)
The Naked Gun: From the Files of Police Squad!	December 2, 1988	David Zucker	Jerry Zucker, Jim Abrahams, David Zucker & Pat Proft	Robert K. Weiss
The Naked Gun 2½: The Smell of Fear	June 28, 1991	David Zucker	David Zucker & Pat Proft	Robert K. Weiss
Naked Gun 33⅓: The Final Insult	March 18, 1994	Peter Segal	Pat Proft and David Zucker & Robert LoCash	Robert K. Weiss and David Zucker
The Naked Gun	August 1, 2025	Akiva Schaffer	Akiva Schaffer and Dan Gregor & Doug Mand	Seth MacFarlane and Erica Huggins

=== The Naked Gun: From the Files of Police Squad! (1988) ===
Detective Frank Drebin (Leslie Nielsen) tries to uncover a plot to assassinate Queen Elizabeth II, who is on an official visit to the United States. The main suspect is Vincent Ludwig, a rich businessman (Ricardo Montalbán), who uses a hypnotic device to turn others into murderers. On the case, Drebin falls in love with Ludwig's assistant, Jane Spencer (Priscilla Presley). She knows nothing about Ludwig's plot, and after the pair spends the night together, Jane helps with Frank's investigation. As with previous ZAZ spoof comedies, the plot was mostly culled from a more serious film, in this case Telefon.

=== The Naked Gun 2½: The Smell of Fear (1991) ===
Frank discovers that Jane's new boyfriend, Quentin Hapsburg (Robert Goulet), is involved in an evil plan to kidnap Dr. Albert S. Meinheimer (Richard Griffiths), a scientist whom President George H. W. Bush (John Roarke) has chosen to determine a new national energy policy. Hapsburg plans to kidnap the real Dr. Meinheimer and replace him with a lookalike named Earl Hacker (also portrayed by Griffiths) who will endorse an energy policy according to the dictates of the energy lobby.

=== Naked Gun 33⅓: The Final Insult (1994) ===
In the third film of the series, Frank is married to Jane, and he has retired from Police Squad. The film introduces the criminal Rocco Dillon (Fred Ward), who is stuck in prison. He is contacted by someone called Papshmir to be given a target for a bombing. Frank is pulled out of retirement. He goes undercover pretending to be a prisoner named "Nick 'the Slasher' McGurk Jr., III" at the jail where Dillon is being held, and they break out of jail. Outside they are escorted by Dillon's gangster mother (Kathleen Freeman) to his country retreat, where Frank also meets Rocco's voluptuous moll (Anna Nicole Smith). The gang plots to blow up the Academy Awards. When Jane arrives looking for Frank, she is taken hostage.

=== The Naked Gun (2025) ===
After years of aborted attempts at a new film, a sequel was greenlit in 2022. Directed by Akiva Schaffer and written by Schaffer, Dan Gregor, and Doug Mand, the film stars Liam Neeson as Frank Drebin Jr. Principal photography was originally tentatively scheduled for summer 2023. Principal photography ran from May to June 2024 in Atlanta, Georgia. The film was released on August 1, 2025.

=== Future ===
In August 2025, producer Erica Huggins said in an interview that discussions about a sequel to the 2025 film were ongoing between the actors, writers and producers.

== Video games ==
=== The Naked Gun: ICUP (2012) ===
The Naked Gun: ICUP, a point-and-click adventure game, was released by Gamecentric Media and Paramount for iOS, Android, and Windows in 2012. The story and concept were penned by Robert LoCash, a writer of the Naked Gun 33 1/3: The Final Insult. Due to Leslie Nielsen's death in 2010, voice actor A.J. LoCascio took over as Frank Drebin Jr., the son of the original character. The game received an average score of 60 on the review aggregator Metacritic.

== Cast and characters ==
List indicators

This section includes characters who will appear or have appeared in notable roles.

- An empty grey cell indicates the character was not in the film, or that the character's official presence has not yet been confirmed.
- ^{C} indicates a cameo role.
- ^{P} indicates an appearance in onscreen photographs.
- ^{U} indicates an uncredited appearance.
- ^{V} indicates a voice-only role.

Character	Television	Film				Video game
Character	Police Squad!	The Naked Gun: From the Files of Police Squad!	The Naked Gun 2½: The Smell of Fear	Naked Gun 33⅓: The Final Insult	The Naked Gun	The Naked Gun: I.C.U.P.
Lt. Franklin "Frank" Drebin	Leslie Nielsen	Leslie Nielsen	Leslie Nielsen	Leslie Nielsen	Leslie Nielsen^{P}	
Capt. Ed Hocken	Alan North	George Kennedy	George Kennedy	George Kennedy	George Kennedy^{P}	
Det. Fred Nordberg	Peter Lupus	O. J. Simpson	O. J. Simpson	O. J. Simpson	O. J. Simpson^{P}	
Ted Olson	Ed Williams	Ed Williams	Ed Williams	Ed Williams		
Al	Ronald "Tiny Ron" Taylor	Ronald "Tiny Ron" Taylor				
Johnny the Snitch	William Duell					
Jane Spencer-Drebin		Priscilla Presley	Priscilla Presley	Priscilla Presley	Priscilla Presley^{C}	
"Weird Al" Yankovic		Himself^{C}	Police station thug^{C}	Himself^{C}	Himself^{C}	
Papshmir		Raye Birk		Raye Birk		
Vincent Ludwig		Ricardo Montalbán				
Mayor Lillian Barkley		Nancy Marchand				
Dominique		Charlotte Zucker				
Queen Elizabeth II		Jeannette Charles	Jeanette Charles^{P}			
Quentin Hapsburg			Robert Goulet			
Dr. Albert S. Meinheimer			Richard Griffiths			
Earl Hacker			Richard Griffiths			
Commissioner Anabell Brumford			Jacqueline Brookes			
Hector Savage			Anthony James			
Terence Baggett			Lloyd Bochner			
President George H. W. Bush			John Roarke			
Rocco Dillon				Fred Ward		
Muriel Dillon				Kathleen Freeman		
Tanya Peters				Anna Nicole Smith		
Louise				Ellen Greene		
Tyrone				Bruce A. Young^{U}		
Franklin "Frank" Drebin Jr.				Adam Hasart^{C}	Liam Neeson	A.J. LoCascio^{V}
Beth Davenport					Pamela Anderson	
Capt. Ed Hocken Jr.					Paul Walter Hauser	Matthew Faulkner^{V}
Richard Cane					Danny Huston	
Sig Gustafson					Kevin Durand	
Chief Davis					CCH Pounder	
Det. Barnes					Liza Koshy	
Det. "Not Nordberg Jr."					Moses Jones	Michael Sweeney^{V}
Ellen						Alison Haislip^{V}
Bella						Michelle Jones^{V}
Ken Wong						Andrew Bush^{V}

== Additional crew and production details ==
Title	Crew/Detail					
Title	Composer	Cinematographer	Editor(s)	Production companies	Distributing company	Running time
Police Squad!	Ira Newborn	Sherman Kunkel	Tom Benko, and Malcolm Campbell	Paramount Television	American Broadcasting Company, CBS Television Distribution	144 minutes (24 mins/episodes)
The Naked Gun: From the Files of Police Squad!	Ira Newborn	Robert M. Stevens	Michael Jablow	Paramount Pictures Corp.	Paramount	85 minutes
The Naked Gun 2½: The Smell of Fear	Ira Newborn	Robert M. Stevens	Christopher Greenbury & James R. Symons	Paramount Pictures, Zucker/Abrahams/Zucker Productions	Paramount Pictures Corporation	85 minutes
Naked Gun 33⅓: The Final Insult	Ira Newborn	Robert M. Stevens	James R. Symons	Paramount Pictures		83 minutes
The Naked Gun	Lorne Balfe	Brandon Trost	Brian Scott Olds	Paramount Pictures, Fuzzy Door Productions	Paramount Pictures	85 minutes

== Reception ==
=== Box office performance ===
Film	Release Date	Opening Weekend (North America)	US/Canada gross	International gross	Total gross	Budget
The Naked Gun: From the Files of Police Squad!	December 2, 1988	$9,331,746	$78,756,177	$73,689,000	$152,445,177	$14.5 million
The Naked Gun 2½: The Smell of Fear	June 28, 1991	$20,817,139	$86,930,411	$105,310,000	$192,240,411	$23 million
Naked Gun 33⅓: The Final Insult	March 18, 1994	$13,216,531	$51,132,598	$81,273,000	$132,405,598	$30 million
The Naked Gun	August 1, 2025	$16,805,560	$52,647,396	$49,500,000	$102,147,396	$42 million
Total			$269,466,582	$309,472,000	$579,238,582	$109.5 million

=== Critical and public response ===
Title	Rotten Tomatoes	Metacritic	CinemaScore
Police Squad!	91% (32 reviews)	—N/a	—N/a
The Naked Gun: From the Files of Police Squad!	88% (142 reviews)	76 (13 reviews)	A−
The Naked Gun 2½: The Smell of Fear	77% (112 reviews)	65 (21 reviews)	B+
Naked Gun 33⅓: The Final Insult	65% (68 reviews)	63 (21 reviews)	B+
The Naked Gun	88% (318 reviews)	75 (48 reviews)	A−

=== Accolades ===
At the 34th Primetime Emmy Awards, Police Squad! was nominated for Outstanding Lead Actor in a Comedy Series (Nielsen) and Outstanding Writing in a Comedy Series ("A Substantial Gift (The Broken Promise)").

At the 1992 MTV Movie Awards, The Naked Gun 2½: The Smell of Fear was nominated for Best Kiss (Nielsen and Presley).

At the 15th Golden Raspberry Awards, Naked Gun 33⅓: The Final Insult won Worst Supporting Actor (Simpson) and Worst New Star (Smith).
