= The Kentucky Fried Movie =

1977 comedy anthology film directed by John Landis

- Theatrical release poster
- Directed by: John Landis
- Written by: Jim Abrahams; David Zucker; Jerry Zucker
- Produced by: Robert K. Weiss
- Starring: Bill Bixby; George Lazenby; Evan C. Kim; Bong Soo Han; Donald Sutherland; Henry Gibson; Barry Dennen; Agneta Eckemyr
- Cinematography: Robert E. Collins; Stephen M. Katz
- Edited by: George Folsey Jr.
- Music by: Igo Kantor
- Production company: Kentucky Fried Theater
- Distributed by: United Film Distribution Company
- Release date: August 10, 1977
- Running time: 83 minutes
- Country: United States
- Language: English
- Budget: $650,000
- Box office: $7.1 million

The Kentucky Fried Movie is a 1977 American sketch comedy film directed by John Landis and written by the trio of Zucker, Abrahams and Zucker (ZAZ). It comprises 26 segments parodying a variety of styles and formats, including television commercials, news broadcasts, exploitation films and public service announcements.

The film was based upon sketches originally created by ZAZ as part of their live comedy show, the Kentucky Fried Theater. Produced independently on a low budget, the film features a large ensemble cast with star cameos including George Lazenby, Bill Bixby, Henry Gibson, Barry Dennen, Donald Sutherland, Tony Dow, Stephen Bishop and the voice of Shadoe Stevens. The "feature presentation" segment, a martial arts film satire, stars Evan C. Kim and hapkido grand master Han Bong-soo.

The Kentucky Fried Movie was released on August 10, 1977. It was both a critical and commercial success, and launched the careers of Landis and ZAZ as mainstream comedy filmmakers.

== Content ==
The Kentucky Fried Movie contains largely unconnected sketches that parody various film genres, including exploitation films. The film's longest segment spoofs early kung fu films, specifically Enter the Dragon; its title, A Fistful of Yen, refers to A Fistful of Dollars. Parodies of disaster films (That's Armageddon), blaxploitation films (Cleopatra Schwartz), and softcore porn/women-in-prison films (Catholic High School Girls in Trouble) are presented as "Coming Attraction" trailers. The fictional films are produced by Samuel L. Bronkowitz (a conflation of Samuel Bronston and Joseph L. Mankiewicz but also a spoof of B-movie producer and American International Pictures co-founder Samuel Z. Arkoff).

The sketch See You Next Wednesday mocks theater-based gimmicks like Sensurround by depicting a dramatic film presented in "Feel-a-Round", which involves an usher physically groping a theater patron. Other sketches spoof TV commercials and programs, news broadcasts, and classroom educational films. The city of Detroit and its high crime rate are a running gag portraying the city as a hell on Earth; in A Fistful of Yen, Dr. Klahn orders a captured CIA agent to be sent to Detroit after which the agent screams and begs for anything else instead.

=== Sketches ===
Title	Runtime	Details
11 O'Clock News (Part 1)	:04	A news announcer tells the film's viewers the popcorn they are eating has been urinated in, then says there will be "Film at 11", which he then says at the end of each subsequent appearance.
Argon Oil	1:13	A commercial for a company that found ways to produce oil from acne, Italian people's hair (taken from combs in their trash) and American fast food.
A.M. Today	6:05	A morning TV news show with hosts and several segments: news correspondent Frank Bowman, unable to hear the announcers, scratches his buttocks and picks his nose on-camera and a studio debate between conservative and liberal pundits John Fitzsimmons and Sheila Hamilton ends in an obscene personal attack. The show's astrologer Joyce Wilson declares that astrology is meant to support people who cannot take responsibility for their own lives. An animal segment introduces a rare hamster, Oscar followed by a gorilla, Dino. Dino, who has been unable to mate, becomes progressively enraged by its female handler Judy Morton's explanations, goes berserk and tears off her shirt. Studio hands try unsuccessfully to restrain Dino as it runs amok and finally smashes the camera. (The gorilla's name, Dino, is named for Dino De Laurentiis, who produced the then-recent version of King Kong in which Rick Baker portrayed the titular ape.)
His New Car	:24	When a man enters a car, multiple alarms sound. As he goes through a succession of actions (locking his door, buckling his seat belt and so on) the alarms shut off one by one until only one remains. Eventually he reaches down and zips the fly on his jeans. The last alarm then stops.
Catholic High School Girls in Trouble	2:00	A parody of sexploitation films, including a topless conversation among three young, large-breasted Catholic high school girls. The first film-within-the-film to be produced by Samuel L. Bronkowitz. (The film's star, Linda Chambers, is named after adult film stars Linda Lovelace and Marilyn Chambers.)
Feel-A-Round	4:52	A man watches a movie entitled See You Next Wednesday presented in "Feel-A-Round." In the lobby appears a poster for the John Landis film Schlock. The usher takes the role of the on-screen female lover. As she asks her male lover to smell her perfume, the usher sprays the viewer with said perfume. It eventually proceeds to chest rubbing and then to a quarrel. The latter culminates with a knife to the throat but ends with a quick kiss. The cinema's announcer invites the man to also stay over for the next film – Deep Throat. As the usher grins, the viewer runs away screaming.
Nytex P.M.	:35	A commercial for a drug that cures headaches by rendering the purchaser unconscious.
High Adventure	3:01	A talk show's boom operator uses a boom mike to cause on-air problems for both the guest Claude La Mont and the host Paul Burmaster.
11 O'Clock News (Part 2)	:05	The news announcer reports that Moscow is "in flames" and missiles are flying towards New York City.
Headache Clinic	:40	A commercial hosted by Bill Bixby shows a clinic's scientists demonstrating their headache-curing drug Sanhedrin by pounding on people's heads. The commercial claims the people are not affected by the pain.
Household Odors	:40	A commercial for household deodorizer that claims that if you do not buy it, guests will bluntly state that your house smells terrible in a variety of humiliating ways.
The Wonderful World of Sex	4:55	A couple plays a phonograph record of a how-to guide for sex. After the couple disrobe, the record instructs them to kiss and begin foreplay. After the male experiences premature ejaculation, the recording sends Big Jim Slade, a briefs-wearing, muscular tight end for the Kansas City Chiefs to carry the woman away and finish her humiliated partner's job, backed by a vigorous choral rendition of the song "Heiveinu Shalom Aleichem." Also listed in some locations (such as IMDb) as Sex Record.
A Fistful of Yen	31:34	One missile from the previously announced dual U.S.S.R/U.S. attack is revealed to be Chinese-made. The Chinese government denies any involvement. The mastermind behind the attack turns out to be a master criminal named Dr. Klahn. (Note: He is a parody of Han (Shih Kien), the main antagonist of Enter the Dragon.) In a parody of Enter the Dragon, the U.K. government hires Loo (a Bruce Lee lookalike with rhotacism) to penetrate Dr. Klahn's mountain fortress and destroy his operation. Loo refuses the mission at first but happily agrees when told that he can kill dozens of people. The fortress is so organized that it even has its own guided tours for its storage of drugs and weapons of mass destruction. When Loo is discovered, he defeats waves of thugs before he is captured by Dr. Klahn. The next morning, Loo defeats Dr. Klahn's bodyguard Butkus (Note: Butkus appears to be a mix of O'Hara (Bob Wall) and Bolo (Bolo Yeung), two of Han's most feared henchmen in Enter the Dragon. The name itself is a reference to the American professional football player Dick Butkus.) in a death match (Note: A reference to the famous fight scene between Lee (Bruce Lee) and O'Hara, in which Lee kills O'Hara to avenge the death of his sister Su Lin (Angela Mao) at the hands of O'Hara and his henchmen.), forcing the tyrant to order his underlings to kill Loo. Meanwhile, Big Jim Slade appears and frees the fortress' prisoners, who rush to engage in battle as well. Loo confronts and kills Dr. Klahn with a bucket of water. In an homage to The Wizard of Oz, Loo is sent back to Kansas after his victory and learns that it may have all been a dream.
Willer Beer	:58	A beer commercial featuring Hare Krishna monks.
11 O'Clock News (Part 3)	:05	The news announcer says that the Rams football team were plagued by fumbles as an earthquake has struck Los Angeles.
Scot Free	:58	A commercial for a board game based on US president John F. Kennedy assassination conspiracy theories.
That's Armageddon	2:17	A parody of the then-common disaster film genre, with Donald Sutherland as the clumsy waiter and George Lazenby as the architect.
United Appeal for the Dead	1:42	A commercial featuring Henry Gibson for an association that supports keeping corpses of deceased family members and treating them like part of the family.
Courtroom (Part 1)	4:35	A spoof of a courtroom trial that takes every word literally and runs like a game show while Beaver and Wally Cleaver (Tony Dow, reprising his role from the original Leave It to Beaver) get into trouble in the jury stand.
Nesson Oil	:14	A commercial for cooking oil in which a little girl is "cooking the cat in pure Nesson oil".
Courtroom (Part 2)	3:02	Beaver and Wally continue to make trouble, while the trial's "surprise" witness Rita Filagree recognizes the TV announcer, Steve McCroskey, as the offender in a car accident. The announcer's name, Steve McCroskey, would later be given to Lloyd Bridges' character in Airplane!.
Cleopatra Schwartz	1:24	A parody of blaxploitation films: A love and marriage story of a Pam Grier–like action heroine Cleopatra and Schwartz, a rabbi. Despite their differences, they live a passionate life, highlighted by the couple sitting in bed with satisfied expressions, with her topless.
Zinc Oxide and You	1:59	A parody of classroom educational films (like A Case of Spring Fever from The Jam Handy Organization) and a 1974 commercial for metal products manufacturer Norris Industries, it shows what happens to a housewife who has many possessions that rely on zinc oxide; one by one they malfunction or disappear, with increasingly undesirable results. Among other things, her bra disappears and her breasts instantly sag under her shirt. Her car crashes through her house as it has no brakes and her husband's pacemaker stops working. Eventually, the gas control valves on her stove disappear, her kitchen catches on fire and everything that can stop the fire also disappears. The segment ends with a brief announcement of a later film in the series, Rebuilding Your Home.
Danger Seekers	1:02	A parody of the 1973–1974 television series, Thrill Seekers: Part-time airline mechanic, full-time daredevil Rex Kramer vows to take on the most dangerous situations possible "for the sake of adventure". Rex, wearing protective gear, walks to the middle of a group of African-American men playing Cee-lo in an alley and screams the racial epithet "Niggers!" whereupon he flees as they angrily pursue him. (The name Rex Kramer would later be given to Robert Stack's character in Airplane!.)
Eyewitness News	4:24	A couple stops watching the TV news to have sex. In a parody of Nineteen Eighty-Four's two-way television, as soon as the man exposes the woman's breasts, the TV news announcer starts stuttering and is joined by the leering news station crew.
11 O'Clock News (Part 4)	:09	The news announcer declares he is not wearing any pants.

The film does not present the sketches in their originally-intended order. The end credits reveal the original order as follows: Cleopatra Schwartz, His New Car, Household Odors, High Adventure, Argon, Danger Seekers, Eyewitness News, Scot Free, Nytex P.M., Feel-A-Round, That’s Armageddon!, United Appeal for the Dead, Headache Clinic, A.M. Today, Catholic High School Girls in Trouble, Courtroom, Willer Beer, Nesson Oil, Sex Record, Zinc Oxide, and A Fistful of Yen.

== Cast ==
List of cast members by segment
Segment	Performer	Role
11 O'Clock News	Neil Thompson	Newscaster
Argon Oil	Colin Male	Spokesman
Argon Oil	John Cassisi	Teenage Volunteer
A.M. Today	Janice Kent	Barbara Duncan
A.M. Today	Michael Laurence	Frank Bowman
A.M. Today	Larry Curran	Tom Leclair
A.M. Today	Mike Hanks	Ron Butler
A.M. Today	William Tregoe	John Fitzsimmons
A.M. Today	Eloise Hardt	Sheila Hamilton
A.M. Today	Mallory Sandler	Astrologer
A.M. Today	Ellen Regan	Judy Morton
A.M. Today	Rick Baker	Dino
His New Car	David Zucker	Driver
Catholic High School Girls in Trouble	Lenka Novak	Linda Chambers
Catholic High School Girls in Trouble	Betsy Genson	Nancy Reems
Catholic High School Girls in Trouble	Nancy Mann	Susan Joyce
Catholic High School Girls in Trouble	Stephen Bishop	Charming Guy
Catholic High School Girls in Trouble	Gwen Van Dam	Mrs. Burke
Catholic High School Girls in Trouble	Uschi Digard	Girl in Shower
Catholic High School Girls in Trouble	Michael Kearns	Man in Shower
Catholic High School Girls in Trouble	Felix Silla	Crazed Clown
Feel-A-Round	Jeff Maxwell	Moviegoer
Feel-A-Round	Michael Alaimo	Usher
Feel-A-Round	Tina Louise	Woman in Movie
Nytex P.M.	Jerry Zucker	Husband
Nytex P.M.	Katherine Wooten	Wife
High Adventure	Joe Medalis	Paul Burmaster
High Adventure	Barry Dennen	Claude LaMont
Headache Clinic	Bill Bixby	Himself
Household Odors	Marcy Goldman	Housewife
Household Odors	Dulcie Jordan	Guest
Household Odors	Gracia Lee	Guest
Household Odors	Sheila Rogers	Guest
The Wonderful World of Sex	John Anthony Bailey	Boy
The Wonderful World of Sex	Sharon Kaough	Girl
The Wonderful World of Sex	Manny Perry	Big Jim Slade
A Fistful of Yen	Evan C. Kim	Loo
A Fistful of Yen	Han Bong-soo	Dr. Klahn
A Fistful of Yen	Agneta Eckemyr	Ming Chow
A Fistful of Yen	Ingrid Wang	Ada Gronick
A Fistful of Yen	Nathan Jung	Butkus
A Fistful of Yen	Derek Murcott	Pennington
A Fistful of Yen	George Cheung	Long Wang
A Fistful of Yen	Marcus K. Mukai	Hung Well
A Fistful of Yen	Norman Tse	Enormous Genitals
A Fistful of Yen	Tony Gaznick	CIA Agent
A Fistful of Yen	Phillip Rhee	Klahn's Guard
A Fistful of Yen	Cho Hee-il	Klahn's Guard
A Fistful of Yen	Branscombe Richmond	Klahn's Guard
A Fistful of Yen	Jun Chong	Klahn's Guard
A Fistful of Yen	Rollin Moriyama	Prisoner
A Fistful of Yen	Tad Horino	Technician
A Fistful of Yen	Lance LeGault	Voice of Toy Robot
That's Armageddon	George Lazenby	The Architect
That's Armageddon	Victoria Carroll	The Nurse
That's Armageddon	Jack Roberts	The Governor
That's Armageddon	Donald Sutherland	The Clumsy Waiter
United Appeal for the Dead	Henry Gibson	Himself
United Appeal for the Dead	Roberta Kent	Mrs. Hefsteder
United Appeal for the Dead	Johnny Hefsteder	Christopher Hanks
Courtroom	Boni Enten	Rita Filagree
Courtroom	Dick Yarmy	Taylor
Courtroom	Michael McManus	Hornung
Courtroom	Ross Durfee	Judge Colis D. Smizer
Courtroom	Stephen Stucker	Gordon Smiley
Courtroom	Tony Dow	Wally Cleaver
Courtroom	Jerry Zucker	Beaver Cleaver
Courtroom	Forrest J Ackerman	Juror
Courtroom	Jim Abrahams	Stephen McCroskey
Courtroom	David Zucker	Grunwald
Cleopatra Schwartz	Marilyn Joi	Cleopatra Schwartz
Cleopatra Schwartz	Saul Kahan	Mr. Schwartz
Zinc Oxide and You	Nancy Steen	Housewife
	Arnold Weiss	Husband
Danger Seekers	Ed Griffith	Host
Danger Seekers	Robert Starr	Rex Kramer
Eyewitness News	Tara Strohmeier	Girl
Eyewitness News	Richard Gates	Boy
Eyewitness News	Neil Thompson	Newscaster

Additionally, voiceovers in multiple segments are performed by Shadoe Stevens, Bob Holt and Robert K. Weiss.

== Background ==
David Zucker, Jerry Zucker and Jim Abrahams made the rounds of the Hollywood studios with the concept and were rejected by all of them, being told, "audiences didn't like movies composed of sketches". Since the three believed in their material, which they had honed in front of the audiences with their improvisational troupe "Kentucky Fried Theater," they decided to make the movie on their own.

== Production ==
=== Development ===
A wealthy real estate investor offered to finance the film if Zucker, Abrahams and Zucker would write a script. After completion of the screenplay, the investor had second thoughts and decided he did not want to finance the film alone. He said he would try to attract other investors if the three filmmakers would produce a 10-minute excerpt of the film, which he would finance. When the trio presented a budget of the short film to the investor, he backed out.

The prospect of shooting the short film so excited Zucker, Abrahams and Zucker that they decided to pay for it themselves. The 10-minute film cost $35,000 and with it they again approached the Hollywood studios. This time, they attached young director John Landis to the project, who came to their attention after an appearance on The Tonight Show promoting his first film Schlock. However, once again, the studios turned them down.

=== Casting ===
According to writer David Zucker on the DVD commentary track, David Letterman auditioned for the role of the newscaster, but was not selected. The film's large ensemble cast also features many former members of The Groundlings and The Second City, while most of the extras in the A Fistful of Yen segment were recruited from local martial arts gyms, among them Han Bong-soo's hapkido dojang. Several prominent martial artists, including Han, Jun Chong, Cho Hee-il and Phillip Rhee, would appear.

Both Jerry Mathers and Tony Dow were approached to reprise their roles as Beaver and Wally Cleaver in the Courtroom segment. Talks with Mathers fell through and Beaver was played by writer David Zucker instead.

=== Filming ===
The film's estimated production budget was between $650,000 and $1 million. Much of the film was shot at an estate in Pasadena, where multiple sets could be constructed. Due to the film's low budget and the high, varied number of sets required, many of them were built outdoors without ceilings so they could be lit naturally with sunlight, reducing the need to construct and maintain lighting equipment.

The exteriors of Dr. Klahn (Han)'s lair in A Fistful of Yen were filmed at Yamashiro Historic District.

== Distribution and release ==
Curious as to how audiences would react to their film, Zucker, Abrahams and Zucker persuaded exhibitor Kim Jorgensen to show it before one of his regularly scheduled films. When Jorgenson saw the short, he "fell out of his seat laughing." He was so impressed that he offered to raise the money needed to make the full-length version. By having his fellow exhibitors screen the film before audiences in their theaters, he convinced them to put up the $650,000 budget. When released, Kentucky Fried Movie was a box-office success, returning domestic American rentals of $7.1 million.

=== Home media ===
Anchor Bay Entertainment released a region 1 DVD in 2000. This release is presented in widescreen (1.85:1) aspect ratio and full-frame (1.33:1). It includes commentary by Landis; writers ZAZ; and producer Robert K. Weiss.

On July 4, 2011, Arrow Video in region 2 released a two-disc special edition DVD with the following special features: Feature presented in widescreen 1.85:1 and full-frame 1.33:1, original mono audio, the audio recollections of director Landis, writers ZAZ and producer Robert K. Weiss, A Conversation with David and Jerry Zucker: A feature length interview with the co-creators of The Kentucky Fried Movie, Airplane! and The Naked Gun about their lives and career, from growing up and starting out in show business to their comedy influences and spoofing Midnight Cowboy, Jerry Zucker's on-set home video shot during the making of the movie, behind-the-scenes photo gallery, original trailer, four-panel reversible sleeve with original and newly commissioned artwork, double-sided fold-out artwork poster and collector's booklet featuring brand new writing on director Landis by critic and author Calum Waddell.

On July 2, 2013, Shout! Factory released the film on Blu-ray in a 1.85:1 aspect widescreen transfer. This version includes the original theatrical trailer, Arrow DVD release filmmaker commentary and Zucker Bros. interview.

== Reception ==
=== Critical response ===
On Rotten Tomatoes, the film has a score of 83%, based on reviews from 35 critics. The site's critical consensus reads: "The now obscure pop culture references and spoofed commercials add to Kentucky Fried Movie's [sic] anarchic, anything-goes spirit and wit." On Metacritic it has a score of 61% based on reviews from 10 critics, indicating "generally favorable reviews".

At the time, Variety described the film as having "excellent production values and some genuine wit" but also noted that the film was juvenile and tasteless. Lawrence Van Gelder of The New York Times wrote, "Lots of people will probably like The Kentucky Fried Movie, just as they like Kentucky Fried Chicken and McDonald's hamburgers. But popularity is still no reason for deifying mediocrity." Gene Siskel of the Chicago Tribune gave the film two stars out of four and wrote that the best moments were "one-joke gags; its writers can't sustain their humor for longer pieces. So, what you're left with is a half-dozen decent gags, one overlong karate flick, and a few shots of bare breasts thrown in to titillate teenage boys." Gary Arnold of The Washington Post called it "a diverting hit-and-miss satirical anthology." Kevin Thomas of the Los Angeles Times wrote, "As is inevitable in such undertakings there are some sophomoric moments, but on the whole Kentucky Fried Movie is, amazingly enough, almost continually funny in its ribald way."

Writing three decades later in 2008, Ian Nathan of Empire magazine calls the film "occasionally funny"... "in a scattershot and puerile way", and he concludes the film is "smart and satirical, but very dated". J. C. Maçek III of PopMatters wrote, "The Kentucky Fried Movie is, however, profane, experimental, violent, silly, hilarious, and occasionally quite sexually explicit (all of which surely helped its success over the years)."

The film ranks number 87 on Bravo's 100 Funniest Movies list.

== Legacy ==
John Landis was recommended to direct National Lampoon's Animal House in 1978 based on his work with The Kentucky Fried Movie.

The film also launched the careers of David Zucker, Jim Abrahams and Jerry Zucker, who subsequently wrote and directed Airplane!, Top Secret! and the Police Squad! television series and its film spin-offs, The Naked Gun films.

== See also ==
- Amazon Women on the Moon
- Disco Beaver from Outer Space
- Everything You Always Wanted to Know About Sex*
- The Groove Tube
- Tunnel Vision
- UHF
- Robot Chicken
- Loose Shoes
- The Onion Movie
- Movie 43
- List of films featuring fictional films
