= Naked Gun 33 1/3: The Final Insult =

1994 film directed by Peter Segal

- Theatrical release poster
- Directed by: Peter Segal
- Written by: Pat Proft; David Zucker; Robert LoCash
- Based on: Police Squad! by: Jim Abrahams; David Zucker; Jerry Zucker
- Produced by: Robert K. Weiss; David Zucker
- Starring: Leslie Nielsen; Priscilla Presley; George Kennedy; O. J. Simpson; Fred Ward
- Cinematography: Robert M. Stevens
- Edited by: James R. Symons
- Music by: Ira Newborn
- Production company: Paramount Pictures
- Distributed by: Paramount Pictures
- Release date: March 18, 1994
- Running time: 83 minutes
- Country: United States
- Language: English
- Budget: $30 million
- Box office: $132 million

Naked Gun 33⅓: The Final Insult is a 1994 American crime comedy film directed by Peter Segal (in his directorial debut) and written by Pat Proft, David Zucker and Robert LoCash. The film is the third installment in The Naked Gun film series, which was based on the television series, Police Squad! It is the sequel to The Naked Gun 2½: The Smell of Fear (1991). The Final Insult is the first film in the series that is not directed by David Zucker, with him serving as producer and co-writer instead. Police Squad! co-creators Jim Abrahams and Jerry Zucker returned as executive producers.

The "33⅓" in the title is a reference to the number of rotations per minute at which phonograph records play. Leslie Nielsen returns as Lieutenant Frank Drebin (his original character from Police Squad!), along with Priscilla Presley as Jane Spencer Drebin, O. J. Simpson (in his last feature film before his arrest on murder charges three months later) as Officer Nordberg, and George Kennedy as Captain Ed Hocken. Newcomers to the series Fred Ward, Anna Nicole Smith, and Kathleen Freeman co-star as a gang of bombers set to blow up the Academy Awards ceremony. Raye Birk reprises his role as Pahpshmir from The Naked Gun: From the Files of Police Squad!

This was the last Naked Gun film to have any involvement by Zucker, Abrahams and Zucker before Abrahams' death in 2024. A fourth Naked Gun film, The Naked Gun, starring Liam Neeson as Lieutenant Frank Drebin Jr., was released in 2025.

== Plot ==
Frank Drebin has retired from Police Squad and lives a seemingly happy life with his wife, Jane Spencer Drebin. In reality, Frank is unfulfilled as a househusband and attends marriage counseling with Jane. Six months after Frank's retirement, he is visited by Ed Hocken and Nordberg, who ask for his help with an investigation. Police Squad has learned that infamous bomber Rocco Dillon, who is currently incarcerated, has been hired by terrorists to conduct a bombing against the United States. Frank remembers Rocco's girlfriend Tanya Peters from an investigation years ago and agrees to help Ed and Nordberg by visiting the clinic where Peters works.

Frank visits the clinic, but it turns out to be a sperm clinic, resulting in Frank having to give a sperm sample over and over again to avoid Tanya recognizing him. He manages to write Tanya's address on a handkerchief, but loses it before he can give it to Ed. Jane comes home to an exhausted Frank and accuses him of doing police work again. Frank lies and swears he is having an affair, but Jane does not believe him and moves out of their house. With nothing else to lose, Frank volunteers to go undercover in prison to befriend Dillon and learn the details of the bombing. Frank is put in Rocco's cell under the name Nick "The Slasher" McGurk. He wins Rocco's trust after protecting their escape plan from a guard and causing a riot. Rocco and Frank escape through a tunnel in their cell and are picked up on the outside by Rocco's mother Muriel. At Rocco's hideout, Frank attempts to get information on the bombing out of Rocco and his mother, but they are suspicious of him and refuse to share details.

Meanwhile, Jane and her friend Louise are on a road trip together when Jane finds the handkerchief with Tanya's address on it. Believing Frank was being truthful about the affair, Jane decides to drive cross-country to the address to find Frank. When she arrives, Frank answers the door and must quickly cover for her; he convinces the Dillons that Jane is a random stranger but that they should keep her as a hostage. Rocco finally reveals his plan to Frank: he will attack the Academy Award ceremony with a bomb hidden in the Best Picture envelope.

At the Awards, Frank traps Muriel in the car and sneaks in with Jane to search for the bomb, with Frank inflicting his usual chaos on stage during the show. Frank encounters Tanya backstage, and she attempts to seduce Frank, but reveals she has a penis, causing Frank to feel sick and flee. Frank bursts onto the stage and tries to stop the detonation of the bomb, but ends up in a stalemate with Rocco and drops an electronic sign which takes out Muriel. Rocco decides to detonate the bomb and die with his mother, but Frank launches Rocco and the bomb into the catwalks above the stage. Frank snares Rocco with a cable and slings him through the arena's roof. Rocco crashes into Pahpshmir's helicopter hovering overhead and the bomb explodes, killing them both. Frank and Jane reaffirm their love to the applause of the audience and viewers worldwide.

Nine months later, Frank and Nordberg rush into a delivery room to witness the birth of Frank's child. They run into the wrong room and Frank is shown a baby with brown skin, causing him to angrily chase Nordberg. Ed comes out of another room with Jane, who is holding their real baby.

== Cast ==
- Leslie Nielsen as Lieutenant Frank Drebin. Frank has retired from Police Squad and spends his days as a househusband.
- Priscilla Presley as Jane Spencer-Drebin, Frank's wife and a career woman. Her marriage is deteriorating and she longs to have a child.
- George Kennedy as Captain Ed Hocken, Frank's boss at Police Squad.
- O. J. Simpson as Detective Nordberg, Frank's old partner.
- Fred Ward as Rocco Dillon, a notorious bomber who's planning to escape prison and attack the Academy Awards.
- Kathleen Freeman as Muriel Dillon, Rocco's mother and a hardened criminal.
- Anna Nicole Smith as Tanya Peters, Rocco's girlfriend and a nurse at a fertility clinic.
- Ellen Greene as Louise, Jane's friend.
- Pia Zadora as Herself, performing "This Could Be the Start of Something Big" at the Academy Awards ceremony.
- Joe Grifasi as Director, at the Academy Awards telecast. (Note: Joe Grifasi also previously appeared as the Pier 32 Dockman in The Naked Gun: From the Files of Police Squad!.)
- Ed Williams as Ted Olsen
- Raye Birk as Pahpshmir, the terrorist who hires Dillon.
- Earl Boen as Dr. Eisendrath
- Charlotte Zucker as Nurse
- Rosalind Allen as Bobbi, the soap opera Actress
- Lois De Banzie as Dr. Kohlzak
- Doris Belack as Dr. Roberts
- Randall "Tex" Cobb as Big Hairy Con
- Ann B. Davis as Herself, cameo as Frank's and Jane's housekeeper. (Note: Ann B. Davis portrayed the housekeeper Alice in The Brady Bunch.)
- Marc Alaimo as Trucker
- Vanna White as Herself, from whom Jane steals a dress to enter the Academy Awards.
- "Weird Al" Yankovic as Himself, from whom Frank steals his Academy Awards invitation. (Note: "Weird Al" Yankovic previously appeared in The Naked Gun as himself and in The Naked Gun 2 1/2 as the police station thug.)
- Mary Lou Retton as Herself
- Chrissy Bocchino as Mother Teresa
- David Zucker as Teleprompter Guy
- Robert K. Weiss as Tuba Player
- Peter Segal as Producer of "Sawdust & Mildew"
- Julie Strain as Dominatrix
- Bill Erwin as Conductor, of the Orchestra Conductor at the Academy Awards.
- John Capodice as Mr. Big, a Mafia boss in Frank's dream
- Timothy Watters as President Clinton, in Frank's dream
- Tim Bohn as Waldo
- Eugene Greytak as Pope John Paul II, in Frank's dream
- Paul Feig as Oscar Audience Member
- R. Lee Ermey as the mess hall guard (uncredited), who discovers Dillon's escape plans.

=== Uncredited cameo appearances ===
Notable actors who appear in the Academy Awards scenes in uncredited cameo appearances as themselves include Elliott Gould and Mariel Hemingway, who present the nominations for Best Supporting Actress to Morgan Fairchild, Shannen Doherty, Florence Henderson, and Mary Lou Retton. Raquel Welch presents the Best Director award. Olympia Dukakis and James Earl Jones present the Best Picture award.

Other celebrities include Diahann Carroll as herself, and Vic Damone as himself.

== Production ==
Production took place in the Los Angeles metropolitan area between August and November 1993.

This is the only film in the series to be directed by Peter Segal, rather than David Zucker, who instead received credit for writing the screenplay. Similar to the previous entry in the series, Jim Abrahams and Jerry Zucker did not write the film's script, but both returned as executive producers and received writing credits due to their contributions to Police Squad! and the first film. In the opening scene at the train station, the woman with the baby carriage who is assisted by Frank Drebin is played by Susan Breslau, the sister of Jerry and David Zucker. Director Peter Segal, in addition to playing the producer of Sawdust and Mildew, also has several minor roles in the film (mostly in voiceover). The dream sequence parodies the train-station shoot-out from the 1987 film The Untouchables, which is itself a homage to the "Odessa Steps" montage in Sergei Eisenstein's famous 1925 silent movie Battleship Potemkin. Pamela Anderson was offered the role of Tanya Peters, but turned it down due to scheduling conflicts. The role eventually went to Anna Nicole Smith. Anderson would eventually be featured in the 2025 film.

== Reception ==
=== Box office ===
The film grossed over $51 million in the United States and Canada and $81 million internationally, for a worldwide total of $132 million. However, this would be the lowest-grossing film of the Naked Gun series. Still, 33 1/3 managed to grab the No. 1 weekend box office title in the U.S. during its opening weekend (the other Naked Guns did as well).

=== Critical response ===
Naked Gun 33⅓: The Final Insult received mixed reviews from critics. The film holds a 66% rating on Rotten Tomatoes, based on 67 reviews, with an average rating of 5.8/10. The website's critical consensus reads, "Naked Gun 33 1/3: The Final Insult can't help but be sporadically funny thanks to Leslie Nielsen's dependably solid work, but it's still a steep comedown from the original." On Metacritic, it has a weighted average score of 63% based on reviews from 21 critics, indicating "generally favorable reviews". Audiences surveyed by CinemaScore gave the film a grade "B+" on scale of A to F.

Siskel and Ebert: Both critics gave Naked Gun 33⅓ "two thumbs up." Ebert praised Leslie Nielsen’s deadpan performance and felt the film's humor worked better than the previous installment. Siskel highlighted the rapid‑fire joke density, noting that the first half of the film was especially strong. Roger Ebert's review in the Chicago Sun-Times gave the film three out of four stars, the same rating he gave to The Naked Gun 2½: The Smell of Fear.

Peter Rainer of the Los Angeles Times praised the opening sequence, which parodied The Untouchables, and the climax at the Academy Awards, but felt the middle was uninspired, and that the film overall had too little plotting and relied too much on comedy without the romantic or action elements of the previous films. Others felt that the humor was weak and too similar to that of the previous films. The movie won two Golden Raspberry Awards: Worst Supporting Actor for O.J. Simpson and Worst New Star for Anna Nicole Smith.

=== Year-end lists ===
- 10th – David Stupich, The Milwaukee Journal
- Honorable mention – Jeff Simon, The Buffalo News
- 3rd worst – John Hurley, Staten Island Advance

== Related litigation ==
An image used on the promotional poster for the film parodies a famous portrait photograph by Annie Leibovitz which was featured on the August 1991 cover of Vanity Fair magazine. The original photograph showed a pregnant, nude Demi Moore, and the parody photograph showed Leslie Nielsen in a similar pose. Leibovitz sued Paramount for copyright infringement; the Second Circuit deemed the use to be protected under the fair use parody clause.

== Legacy sequel ==
Although 33⅓: The Final Insult was intended to be the final installment, in 2009, it was revealed that a fourth film starring Leslie Nielsen was coming out as a direct-to-TV sequel, and that it was going to be about Frank training a young rookie. The film was given the title The Naked Gun 4: Rhythm of Evil. The script was thought to be very funny, but due to financial reasons, it was canceled in 2009. The script was written by Alan Spencer. The original writers of the first movie, the Zucker-Abrahams-Zucker team tried to stop it from happening. According to Alan Spencer, he signed on to write the film as a "rescue mission" to save an inferior sequel from happening. The script impressed the Paramount folks and online reviewers so much that it was briefly shifted to the theatrical department. Spencer wrote a sizable role for Leslie Nielsen, who would be passing the torch to a new generation of incompetent cops, but Paramount asked him to reduce the part to a cameo for budgetary reasons and then decided to remove Nielsen's character altogether. Spencer then left the project when he was asked to take Nielsen's character out, and the film never got made.

Starting in 2013, Paramount worked on a reboot of the franchise, including one iteration that featured Ed Helms as Frank with a script by Thomas Lennon and Robert Ben Garant. An eventual fourth movie, The Naked Gun starring Liam Neeson as Frank Drebin Jr., was released on August 1, 2025.
