= Terrence Beasor =

American film, stage and television actor

- Beasor in The Middle, 2010
- Born: February 2, 1935; Omaha, Nebraska, U.S.
- Died: May 28, 2024 (aged 89); Santa Monica, California, U.S.
- Education: Brandeis University
- Occupations: Film, stage and television actor
- Spouse: Muriel Minot

Terrence Beasor (February 2, 1935 – May 28, 2024) was an American film, stage and television actor. He was best known for playing the recurring role of Mr. Johnson, the Hecks' elderly neighbor in the American sitcom television series The Middle.

== Life and career ==
Beasor was born in Omaha, Nebraska. At the age of seven, he and his family moved to Los Angeles, California. He attended and graduated from Garfield High School. After graduating, he served in the United States Navy, which after his discharge, he performed at the Pasadena Playhouse, and he performed with his wife Muriel Minot at the Equity Library Theatre. They both moved to Concord, Massachusetts, and he attended Brandeis University, earning his MFA degree in 1976.

Beasor began his screen career in 1979, appearing in the ABC science fiction television series Salvage 1. In 1984, he played Eddie, a suitor in the stage play Bing and Walker. He guest-starred in numerous television programs including Cheers, Days of Our Lives, Hill Street Blues, Hunter, The Young and the Restless, Police Squad!, Star Trek: The Next Generation, Gilmore Girls, Raising Hope, The Office, Knots Landing and The Greatest American Hero, and played the recurring role of Mr. Johnson, the Hecks' elderly neighbor in the ABC sitcom television series The Middle. He also appeared in films such as Walk Hard: The Dewey Cox Story, Passenger 57, Time Trackers, Walking the Edge and Strange Wilderness.

Beasor retired from acting in 2020, last appearing in the Showtime family tragicomedy television series Kidding.

== Death ==
Beasor died on May 28, 2024, at his home in Santa Monica, California, at the age of 89.
