= Zucker, Abrahams and Zucker =

American comedy filmmaking trio

- Other name: Kentucky Fried Theatre
- Notable work: The Kentucky Fried Movie; Airplane! Top Secret! Ruthless People; The Naked Gun

Comedy career
- Years active: 1971–1994
- Medium: Film
- Genre: Slapstick comedy
- Subjects: Parodies; Visual gags; Fourth wall breaking
- Members: David Zucker; Jim Abrahams; Jerry Zucker

Zucker, Abrahams and Zucker (abbreviated to ZAZ) was an American comedy filmmaking trio consisting of Jim Abrahams and brothers David and Jerry Zucker who specialized in writing slapstick comedy films during the 1980s. Members of the team have often collaborated with writer Pat Proft.

== History ==
David Zucker, Jim Abrahams, and Jerry Zucker knew one another as children while growing up in Shorewood, Wisconsin and while attending Shorewood High School, which is sometimes referenced in their work. While attending the University of Wisconsin–Madison, the trio founded a small theater known as The Kentucky Fried Theater in 1971 which led to their sketch comedy film The Kentucky Fried Movie in 1977. This was followed by the trio's breakout hit Airplane! in 1980, which remains a revered comedic milestone. Subsequent collaborations include Top Secret!, Ruthless People, and The Naked Gun.

All of their projects relied heavily on parodies, visual gags and breaking of the fourth wall, and established a strong 1980s cult following. The notable stylistic exception is Ruthless People; a more traditional farce that was directed by the trio but, unlike their other productions, not written by them. The trio's status as a three-person team of co-directors is highly unusual, although some of their later projects were directed by David Zucker working solo and with Jerry Zucker and Abrahams credited only as producers and/or writers.

The trio split up in the 1990s for fiscal and creative reasons, stating that there were "too many guys sitting in the same chair". They also said that they had been treated unfairly by the studios that produced their films, claiming that they failed to see any profits from Ruthless People. Nevertheless, the three still maintained a close friendship until Abrahams died in 2024.

== Filmography ==
=== Film ===
Year	Title	Directors	Writers	Executive Producers	Notes
1977	The Kentucky Fried Movie	No	Yes	No	Also cameos
1980	Airplane!	Yes	Yes	Yes	Also cameos
1984	Top Secret!	Yes	Yes	Yes	Co-written with Martyn Burke; also cameos
1986	Ruthless People	Yes	No	No	
1988	The Naked Gun: From the Files of Police Squad!	David Zucker only	Yes	Yes	Co-written with Pat Proft
1991	The Naked Gun 2½: The Smell of Fear	David Zucker only	David Zucker only	Jim Abrahams and Jerry Zucker only	co-written with Pat Proft; David Zucker cameo
1992	Brain Donors	No	No	Yes	
1994	Naked Gun 33 1/3: The Final Insult	No	David Zucker only	Jim Abrahams and Jerry Zucker only	David Zucker cameo

=== Television ===
Year	Title	Directors	Writers	Executive Producers	Notes
1976	Big John, Little John	No	Yes	No	Episode "Abracadbra"
1982	Police Squad!	Yes	Yes	Yes	Episode "A Substantial Gift (The Broken Promise)" (pilot); also series creators

== Solo work ==
=== Jim Abrahams ===
Year	Title	Director	Writer	Executive Producer	Notes
1988	Big Business	Yes	No	No	
1990	Cry-Baby	No	No	Yes	
1990	Welcome Home, Roxy Carmichael	Yes	No	No	
1991	Hot Shots!	Yes	Yes	No	
1993	Hot Shots! Part Deux	Yes	Yes	No	
1994	An Introduction to the Ketogenic Diet	Yes	No	No	Documentary short
1997	...First Do No Harm	Yes	Yes	Yes	TV movie
1998	Mafia!	Yes	Yes	No	
2006	Scary Movie 4	No	Yes	No	
2018	Voice of the Epilepsies	No	No	Yes	Documentary film

=== David Zucker ===
Year	Title	Director	Writer	Producer	Notes
1987	Our Planet Tonight	No	No	Executive	TV movie
1993	For Goodness Sake	Yes	Yes	Yes	Short film
1995	A Walk in the Clouds	No	No	Yes	
1996	High School High	No	Yes	Yes	
1996	For Goodness Sake II	No	No	Executive	Short film
1998	BASEketball	Yes	Yes	Yes	Also executive music producer
2000	Absolutely True	No	No	Executive	
2002	Phone Booth	No	No	Yes	
2003	My Boss's Daughter	Yes	No	No	Also wrote early draft screenplay
2003	Scary Movie 3	Yes	No	No	
2006	Scary Movie 4	Yes	No	No	
2008	An American Carol	Yes	Yes	Yes	
2008	The Onion Movie	No	No	Yes	
2008	Superhero Movie	No	No	Yes	
2013	Scary Movie 5	No	Yes	Yes	Also directed additional scenes
2019	Late Night Berlin	No	No	Creative	Episode "Folge 42"

=== Jerry Zucker ===
Year	Title	Director	Writer	Producer	Notes
1987	Our Planet Tonight	No	No	Executive	TV movie
1990	Ghost	Yes	No	No	
1993	My Life	No	No	Yes	
1995	A Walk in the Clouds	No	No	Yes	
1995	First Knight	Yes	No	Yes	
1997	My Best Friend's Wedding	No	No	Yes	
2001	Rat Race	Yes	No	Yes	
2002	Unconditional Love	No	No	Yes	
2010	Fair Game	No	No	Yes	
2011	Friends with Benefits	No	No	Yes	
2012	Mental	No	No	Yes	
2013	Dear Dumb Diary	No	No	Executive	
2019	Late Night Berlin	No	No	Creative	Episode "Folge 42"
