= Police Squad! =

1982 American television crime comedy series

- Title card
- Genre: Parody; Police procedural
- Created by: Zucker, Abrahams and Zucker
- Written by: David Zucker; Jim Abrahams; Jerry Zucker; Tino Insana; Nancy Steen; Neil Thompson; Robert Wuhl
- Starring: Leslie Nielsen; Alan North; Peter Lupus; Ed Williams; William Duell
- Narrated by: Leslie Nielsen
- Theme music composer: Ira Newborn
- Opening theme: "Theme from Police Squad!"
- Composer: Ira Newborn
- Country of origin: United States
- Original language: English
- No. of seasons: 1
- No. of episodes: 6

Production
- Executive producers: David Zucker; Jim Abrahams; Jerry Zucker
- Cinematography: Sherman Kunkel
- Editors: Tom Benko; Malcolm Campbell
- Camera setup: Single-camera
- Running time: 24–25 minutes
- Production company: Paramount Television

Original release
- Network: ABC
- Release: March 4 – July 8, 1982

Related
- The Naked Gun film series

Police Squad! is an American television series created by David Zucker, Jim Abrahams, and Jerry Zucker for the American Broadcasting Company. It stars Leslie Nielsen as Frank Drebin and Alan North as Captain Ed Hocken. A spoof of police procedurals and many other television shows and movies, the series features Zucker, Abrahams and Zucker's usual sight gags, wordplay, and non sequiturs. It resembles the Lee Marvin police show M Squad (in particular the opening credits) and the late 1960s series Felony Squad. Airing from March 4 to July 8, 1982, it was canceled after six episodes, though it was followed by the critically successful The Naked Gun film series from 1988 to 1994, along with the 2025 legacy sequel The Naked Gun.

== Overview ==
Police Squad! was created by David Zucker, Jim Abrahams, and Jerry Zucker (ZAZ), who had previously worked on the films The Kentucky Fried Movie (1977) and Airplane! (1980). ZAZ wanted to make another spoof film similar to Airplane!, using the television series M Squad as a basis for the spoof. Lacking an overarching plot for the concept, Paramount Pictures president Michael Eisner instead secured them a six-episode television series, despite ZAZ wanting to make it into a film.

The show aired as a mid-season replacement in March 1982, but was taken off the schedule after four episodes. The remaining two episodes were dumped onto the summer schedule in place of the usual summer reruns. Against critical acclaim, the show was canceled by ABC. The show gained a strong cult following through repeat broadcasts on cable channels.

Alan North played Captain Ed Hocken, and Peter Lupus co-starred as Officer Norberg. In the films, those roles were played by George Kennedy and O. J. Simpson respectively, with Norberg renamed Nordberg. The only actors who reprised their roles in the films are Leslie Nielsen, Ed Williams as scientist Ted Olson, and Ronald "Tiny Ron" Taylor as the very tall Al. Joyce Brothers played herself in the fourth episode and in The Naked Gun: From the Files of Police Squad!. Robert Goulet, one of the "special guest stars" killed during the title sequence, plays the villain Quentin Hapsburg in The Naked Gun 2½: The Smell of Fear.

== Cast ==
- Leslie Nielsen as Frank Drebin, detective lieutenant of Police Squad. Jerry Zucker explained that the name Drebin was picked blindly from the phone book. Zucker, Abrahams, and Zucker had met Nielsen when working on Airplane! (1980) and decided that their kind of humor matched. The team said that Nielsen would be perfect as Drebin, as the character lampooned the roles that Nielsen had played in television dramas such as The Bold Ones: The Protectors and S.W.A.T.
- Alan North as Ed Hocken, captain of Police Squad and Drebin's superior officer. in The Naked Gun film series, the role was played by George Kennedy.
- Peter Lupus as Norberg, a dimwitted officer who serves under Drebin. In The Naked Gun films, the character was slightly renamed to "Nordberg" and was played by O.J. Simpson.
- Ed Williams as Ted Olson, a lab technician at Police Squad. Prior to being cast, Williams had been a science teacher for many years and had some previous acting experience. Zucker, Abrahams, and Zucker were amazed by his performance.
- William Duell as Johnny the Snitch, a shoeshiner who acts as an informant for Drebin on multiple cases. Johnny is the only recurring character from Police Squad! to not appear in any of The Naked Gun films.
- Ronald "Tiny Ron" Taylor as Al, an abnormally tall officer whose head is always placed out of frame.

Rex Hamilton is also credited in every episode as "Abraham Lincoln".

== Episodes ==
Each episode's voiced title differs from that displayed on screen. In the following list, the voiced title is in parentheses.

No.	Title	Directed by	Written by	Original release date	Prod. code
1	"A Substantial Gift (The Broken Promise)"	David Zucker; Jim Abrahams; Jerry Zucker	David Zucker; Jim Abrahams; Jerry Zucker	March 4, 1982	1PS01
Special guest star: Lorne Greene; Sally Decker (Kathryn Leigh Scott), a teller at a credit union, murders her boss so she can steal money from the credit union and pay her orthodontist bills. She kills a customer and frames him for the murder. The Police Squad department is called in to investigate the case. Frank is suspicious about the customer's guilt.
2	"Ring of Fear (A Dangerous Assignment)"	Joe Dante	Story by : David Misch; Teleplay by : Tino Insana & Robert Wuhl	March 11, 1982	1PS02
Special guest star: Georg Stanford Brown; To expose corrupt boxing manager Mr. Martin (Rudy Solari), Frank goes undercover as a manager. Frank makes a deal with boxer Buddy Briggs, whom he trains for a title fight against the current champion "The Champ" (Grand L. Bush). However, Martin has kidnapped Briggs's wife, and will only release her if Briggs throws the fight. Frank has to find Buddy's wife before Buddy gets knocked out.
3	"Rendezvous at Big Gulch (Terror in the Neighborhood)"	Reza Badiyi	Story by : Pat Proft; Teleplay by : Nancy Steen & Neil Thompson	July 1, 1982	1PS03
Special guest star: Florence Henderson; After a small group of mobsters blackmail various store-owners, Frank and Norberg go undercover and set up a key-making and locksmith store. The mobsters offer Frank "protection" in exchange for money, but Frank declines. While they attack the store with guns, Frank and Norberg's Locksmith store remains, enraging the mobsters' boss.
4	"Revenge and Remorse (The Guilty Alibi)"	Paul Krasny	Nancy Steen and Neil Thompson	March 25, 1982	1PS04
Special guest stars: William Shatner, Dr. Joyce Brothers; The Police Squad department is sent to investigate a bombing at the courthouse. The main suspect is Eddie Casales (Spencer Milligan), a bomber who was previously incarcerated by the victims killed in the explosion. Following the attack on the courthouse, the assistant DA who prosecuted Casales is killed with a bomb hidden in his car. All evidence points to Casales, but Frank thinks it is a setup.
5	"The Butler Did It (A Bird in the Hand)"	Georg Stanford Brown	Story by : Deborah Hwang-Marriott & Robert K. Weiss; Teleplay by : Pat Proft	March 18, 1982	1PS05
Special guest stars: Robert Goulet, Tommy Lasorda; Frank, Ed, and Norberg investigate the kidnapping of Terri Burton (Lilibet Stern), the daughter of a wealthy businessman, who was abducted during her 18th birthday party. The kidnappers demand a ransom of $1,000,000. The only witness to the kidnapping is Burton's boyfriend Kingsley Addison (Ken Michelman), who had plans to marry Burton.
6	"Testimony of Evil (Dead Men Don't Laugh)"	Joe Dante	Tino Insana & Robert Wuhl	July 8, 1982	1PS06
Special guest stars: William Conrad, Dick Clark; Frank investigates the body of a struggling comedian found at the bottom of a cliff in a car crash. Although the comedian's death appears to be a suicide, Frank soon learns that this comedian was an informant infiltrating a drug ring at the nightclub he worked. To catch the perpetrator, Frank takes the place of the deceased at the nightclub.

== Production ==
=== Opening sequence ===
Drebin, Norberg, and Hocken are the main characters of Police Squad!.

The show's opening sequence is a satire on traditional crime-drama opening sequences, particularly those of M Squad and various Quinn Martin shows such as The Fugitive and particularly The New Breed (which also stars Nielsen). Hank Simms, who had worked as an announcer for some of Martin's programs, announced the title of each episode, though the spoken title never matches the title caption. The sequence introduces Nielsen and North during a shootout, and Abraham Lincoln impersonator Rex Hamilton, who dramatically returns gunfire to John Wilkes Booth, as his only appearance.

Another recurring gag in the opening credits sequence is the "special guest star", a celebrity who is introduced but immediately murdered. These special guest stars are Lorne Greene, Georg Stanford Brown, Florence Henderson, William Shatner, Robert Goulet, and William Conrad. John Belushi was slated as "special guest star" for the fifth episode and a scene with Belushi tied to blocks of concrete under water was filmed. Following Belushi's unexpected death in March 1982, the scene was replaced with footage of Florence Henderson before the episode was broadcast the following July. Belushi's accidental death shocked Zucker, Abrahams, and Zucker, as they had joked about it after he had nearly choked during the filming of the scene. A list of possible celebrity death shots was included in the DVD release.

=== Writing ===
The show was intended to mock police dramas in the same way in which Airplane! mocks disaster movies. Zucker, Abrahams, and Zucker wrote the pilot episode, in which most straight lines were directly copied from an M Squad episode. The pilot episode is a near scene-for-scene remake of "More Deadly", the opening episode of the second season of M Squad. Pat Proft, who had worked with Zucker, Abrahams, and Zucker on The Kentucky Fried Movie (1977) and Airplane! (1980), wrote the third episode. Robert Wuhl was invited to join the writing staff after he had auditioned for the lead role in Airplane!. He co-wrote the show's second and sixth episodes with Tino Insana. Both episodes contain cultural references to old movies such as On the Waterfront and The French Connection. In Wuhl's audio commentary for the DVD, he mentioned that it was a nice opportunity, but that he did not really feel a connection with the show, especially because of its short run.

=== Direction ===
The first episode of Police Squad! was directed by Jim Abrahams, David Zucker, and Jerry Zucker. Two of the show's six episodes were directed by filmmaker Joe Dante, who recalled in 2008,

I knew the Zuckers from second unit on Rock 'n' Roll High School and Kentucky Fried Movie and had turned down Airplane! – don't ask! When they got Police Squad! going, they asked me to do the second one. It only lasted six episodes, two of which I directed. ABC had no idea what to do with the show, which had no laugh track and resembled a rerun of a '60s program. The network kept changing the time slot so no one could find it, and people casually switching it on thought it really was an old TV show! Like they did in their features, the boys used real TV episodes as their template, mostly a '50s Lee Marvin series called M Squad. It was lots of fun to do and was the first thing I ever directed on a studio lot. I prefer the TV show to the later Naked Gun movies.

== Cancellation ==
ABC announced the cancellation of Police Squad! after four of its six episodes had aired in March 1982. The final two episodes were aired that summer. In an interview for the DVD release of the series, Nielsen said ABC entertainment president Tony Thomopoulos asserted Police Squad! was canceled because viewers had to pay close attention to the show in order to get much of the humor: "the viewer had to watch it in order to appreciate it". Nielsen also thought the premise was more effective in the successful Naked Gun films because the much larger screen size in a cinema increases the efficacy of the visual gags. In its annual "Cheers and Jeers" issue, TV Guide magazine called the explanation for the cancellation "the most stupid reason a network ever gave for ending a series".

== Home media ==
In 1985, Paramount Home Video first released all six episodes of the show on VHS, Betamax, and LaserDisc formats as two separate volumes: Police Squad!: Help Wanted! and More! Police Squad!, each with three episodes in their production order, with a re-release in 1989. Paramount and CBS DVD first released the series on DVD in 2006 in a keep case on one disc. The episodes are in airing order from ABC. The DVD extras include production notes from network executives, a "freeze-frame" that was filmed but never used, bloopers, casting tests, and an interview with Nielsen. Zucker, Abrahams, and Zucker, producer Robert K. Weiss, and writer Robert Wuhl recorded audio commentary for the first, third, and sixth episodes. Critics universally praised how the show was still funny after more than 20 years. The series was released in Blu-ray format in the US on April 14, 2020.

On November 1, 2026, all six episodes of Police Squad! became available to stream on Netflix in the United States.

== Legacy ==
=== Naked Gun film series ===
After the cancellation of Police Squad!, ZAZ returned to films, creating the comedies Top Secret! and Ruthless People. At this point, they were able to identify a narrative to apply to the Police Squad! formula for a theatrical film by adding a romantic plotline, and the film The Naked Gun: From the Files of Police Squad! was readily greenlit by Paramount. It performed well at the box office, grossing around $78,756,177. The film led to the Naked Gun trilogy with two sequels, The Naked Gun 2½: The Smell of Fear (1991) and Naked Gun 33⅓: The Final Insult (1994), were released. The Naked Gun 2½: The Smell of Fear was considered the most successful of the three, grossing around $86,930,411, and Naked Gun 33⅓: The Final Insult grossed $51,132,598. Roger Ebert rated the first movie 3½ out of four stars and gave three stars to each of the two following films.

=== Spin-offs ===
A series of British advertisements for Red Rock Cider were made in the same style in 1990, with the opening titles changed to other names such as "Fraud Squad" or "Fried Squid", and featuring Leslie Nielsen. The advertisements were shown in British cinemas as well as on television. They were directed by John Lloyd, with such apparent success that Zucker, Abrahams, and Zucker approached him to direct Naked Gun 33 1/3: The Final Insult, but he turned them down.

During the WWE's SummerSlam 1994 pay-per-view event, the Police Squad! characters look for The Undertaker, who had previously vanished.

== Reception ==
=== Critical response ===
On Rotten Tomatoes, Police Squad! has an aggregate score of 90% based on 28 positive and three negative critic reviews. The website's consensus reads: "Wacky, inventive, and endlessly quotable, Police Squad! is a hysterically funny leap forward for TV comedy that was tragically ahead of its time."

Upon the home video release in 1985, Washington Post critic Tom Shales commented "People can rent them and laugh, and then cry that ABC was so cruel." In 2009, the DVD set was nominated for a Satellite Award for Best DVD Release of a TV Show, though it lost to the DVD set of the eighth season of Fox's The Simpsons. In 2013, TV Guide ranked it #7 on its list of 60 shows that were "Cancelled Too Soon".

Matt Groening, creator of The Simpsons, has said, "If Police Squad! had been made twenty years later, it would have been a smash. It was before its time. In 1982 your average viewer was unable to cope with its pace, its quick-fire jokes. But these days they'd have no problems keeping up, I think we've proved that."

=== Awards and nominations ===
Year	Award	Category	Nominee(s)	Result	Ref.
1982	Primetime Emmy Awards	Outstanding Lead Actor in a Comedy Series	Leslie Nielsen	Nominated	
1982	Primetime Emmy Awards	Outstanding Writing in a Comedy Series	Jim Abrahams, David Zucker, and Jerry Zucker (Episode: "A Substantial Gift (The Broken Promise)")	Nominated	
2006	Satellite Awards	Best DVD Release of TV Shows	The Complete Series	Nominated	
2014	Online Film & Television Association Awards	Television Hall of Fame: Productions	Season 1	Inducted	

== See also ==
- Sledge Hammer!, a sustained satire of Dirty Harry and other action heroes
- A Touch of Cloth, a 2012 British crime spoof miniseries
- Angie Tribeca, a 2016 TV crime spoof series
