= Dan Gregor =

American comedian, director and producer

- Education: New York University
- Occupations: Actor; Comedian; Writer; Producer
- Years active: 2010–present
- Spouse: Rachel Bloom (m. 2015)
- Children: 1

Comedy career
- Medium: Television; film; theatre
- Genres: Improvisational comedy; sketch comedy; black comedy; blue comedy; musical comedy; surreal humor; satire; cringe comedy

Dan Gregor is an American comedian, writer, director and producer. He is mostly known for Chip 'n Dale: Rescue Rangers, Crazy Ex-Girlfriend, and Most Likely to Murder.

== Early and personal life ==
In 2015, Gregor married his girlfriend of six years, actress, comedian, singer, writer, and producer Rachel Bloom. Her cousin, a rabbi, performed the ceremony. They have a daughter, born in March 2020.

== Career ==
Gregor got his start as a founding member of Hammerkatz, a comedy group at New York University and later at the Upright Citizens Brigade Theater. He worked as a writer and producer on the CBS television series How I Met Your Mother from 2010 to 2014, and from 2015 to 2019 he worked as a writer, producer, and director on the CW television series Crazy Ex-Girlfriend. His film directorial debut Most Likely to Murder premiered at SXSW on March 12, 2018 and was purchased by Lionsgate and Hulu.

== Filmography ==
=== Film ===
Year	Title	Writer	Producer	Director	Notes	Ref(s)
2018	Most Likely to Murder	Yes	Executive	Yes		
2020	Dolittle	Yes	No	No		
2020	Magic Camp	Yes	No	No		
2022	Chip 'n Dale: Rescue Rangers	Yes	Co-producer	No		
2025	The Naked Gun	Yes	Co-producer	No		

=== Television ===
Year	Title	Writer	Producer	Director	Notes	Ref(s)
2011–2014	How I Met Your Mother	Yes	Co-producer	No		
2012	NTSF:SD:SUV::	Yes	No	No		
2015	The Comedians	Yes	Consulting	No		
2016–2019	Crazy Ex-Girlfriend	Yes	Consulting	Yes		
2020–2021	Earth to Ned	Yes	Coordinating	No		
2021	Pretty Smart	Yes	Consulting	No		
2024	Mother Mary	Yes	Co-executive producer	Yes	Completed pilot	

=== Acting credits ===
Year	Title	Role	Notes	Ref(s)
2015	The Comedians	Dan Gregor	3 episodes	
2016–2019	Crazy Ex-Girlfriend	Doctor Roth	4 episodes	
2018	Portlandia	Dan	Episode: "No Thank You"	
2022	Chip 'n Dale: Rescue Rangers	Snoopy Ear Reporter		
