= Jerry Zucker =

American film director, producer, and screenwriter (born 1950)

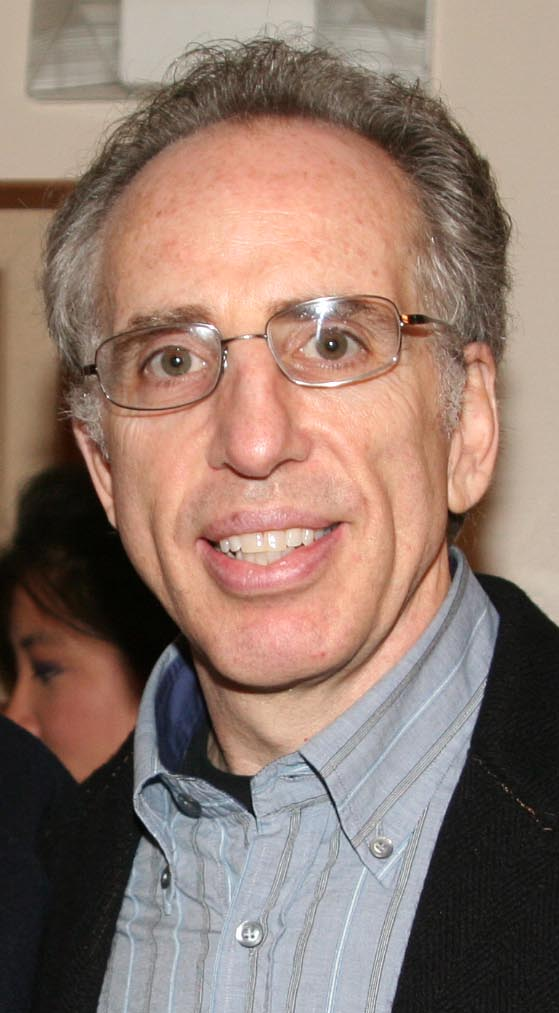
- Zucker in 2006
- Born: Jerry Gordon Zucker; March 11, 1950 (age 76); Milwaukee, Wisconsin, U.S.
- Occupation: Filmmaker
- Years active: 1976–present
- Spouse: Janet Krausz (m. 1987)
- Children: 2
- Mother: Charlotte Zucker
- Family: David Zucker (brother)

Jerry Gordon Zucker (born March 11, 1950) is an American filmmaker. With his brother David and Jim Abrahams, he is part of the filmmaking trio Zucker, Abrahams and Zucker.

He is best known for his role in writing and directing comedy spoof films like Airplane! (1980) and Top Secret! (1984), and for co-creating the television series Police Squad!, which was later adapted into The Naked Gun film series.

He is also the director of the Academy Award-winning supernatural drama film Ghost (1990), the first box-office topper of the 1990s.

== Early life ==
Zucker was born to a Jewish family in Milwaukee, Wisconsin, the son of Charlotte A. (Lefstein) (d. 2007) and Burton C. Zucker, who was a real estate developer. He graduated from Shorewood High School. His paternal grandfather was Leonard Zucker who emigrated from Russia to the United States and became a naturalized citizen.

== Career ==
Zucker's early career work started with Jim Abrahams and brother David Zucker. The trio performed in Madison, Wisconsin as a sketch and comedy troupe called "Kentucky Fried Theater.” They later adapted several of these sketches into a comedy anthology film, The Kentucky Fried Movie, directed by John Landis and released in 1977.

From there the three went on and together co-directed Airplane! in 1980 and then went on to do Top Secret! in 1984, and Ruthless People in 1986. Along with Jim Abrahams, the Zuckers constitute the "ZAZ" team of directors.

In 1987, both Jerry and David Zucker through Zucker Brothers Productions had signed an agreement with Paramount Pictures for a two-year non-exclusive production agreement and development deal with the studio. The brothers had anticipated cranking out four comedies for Paramount Pictures during the life of the pact; the first film was a feature film version of the early 1980s television show Police Squad!, which was originally cancelled after six episodes on the air.

In 1990, he lent his directorial skills to the dramatic genre with Ghost, which was nominated for an Academy Award for Best Picture and won Whoopi Goldberg her only Oscar. Zucker's most recent directorial effort is the 2001 film Rat Race.

Zucker's films have been ranked among the greatest comedies of all time: Airplane! was ranked at the top of Entertainment Weekly's list of best comedy films and AFI listed it as #10; Top Secret! made Entertainment Weekly's Top 100 list.

== Personal life ==
Like his brother David Zucker, Jerry often cast his mother, Charlotte (who died in 2007), and his sister, Susan Breslau, in small roles in his films.

== Filmography ==
=== Film ===
Year	Title	Director	Writer	Producer	Notes
1977	The Kentucky Fried Movie	No	Yes	No	
1980	Airplane!	Yes	Yes	Executive	Co-director with Jim Abrahams & David Zucker
1984	Top Secret!	Yes	Yes	Executive	Co-director with Jim Abrahams & David Zucker
1986	Ruthless People	Yes	No	No	Co-director with Jim Abrahams & David Zucker
1988	The Naked Gun: From the Files of Police Squad!	No	Yes	Executive	
1990	Ghost	Yes	No	No	
1991	The Naked Gun 2½: The Smell of Fear	No	Characters	Executive	
1994	Naked Gun 33⅓: The Final Insult	No	Characters	Executive	
1995	First Knight	Yes	No	Yes	
2001	Rat Race	Yes	No	Yes	
2025	The Naked Gun	No	Characters	No	

Producer only

Year	Title	Director	Notes
1992	Brain Donors	Dennis Dugan	Executive producer
1993	My Life	Bruce Joel Rubin	
1995	A Walk in the Clouds	Alfonso Arau	
1997	My Best Friend's Wedding	P. J. Hogan	
2002	Unconditional Love	P. J. Hogan	
2010	Fair Game	Doug Liman	
2011	Friends with Benefits	Will Gluck	
2012	Mental	P. J. Hogan	

Acting roles

Year	Title	Role(s)	Notes
1977	The Kentucky Fried Movie	Technician #3 / Man / Beaver / Hands	
1980	Airplane!	Ground Crewman #1	
1984	Top Secret!	East German Soldier	
1995	Your Studio and You	Himself	Short film
2014	Asthma	Gus' Father	

=== Television ===
Year	Title	Director	Writer	Producer	Notes
1976	Big John, Little John	No	Yes	No	writer of episode "Abracadabra"
1982	Police Squad!	Yes	Yes	Executive	director and writer of episode "A Substantial Gift (The Broken Promise)"
1987	Our Planet Tonight	No	No	Executive	TV movie
2013	Dear Dumb Diary	No	No	Executive	TV movie
2019	Late Night Berlin	No	No	Creative	Episode "Folge 42"

Acting roles

Year	Title	Role	Note
1972	The Tonight Show Starring Johnny Carson	Performer	Part as Kentucky Fried Theater in one episode
1974	The Midnight Special	Performer	Part as Kentucky Fried Theater in one episode
