= David Zucker =

American film director (born 1947)

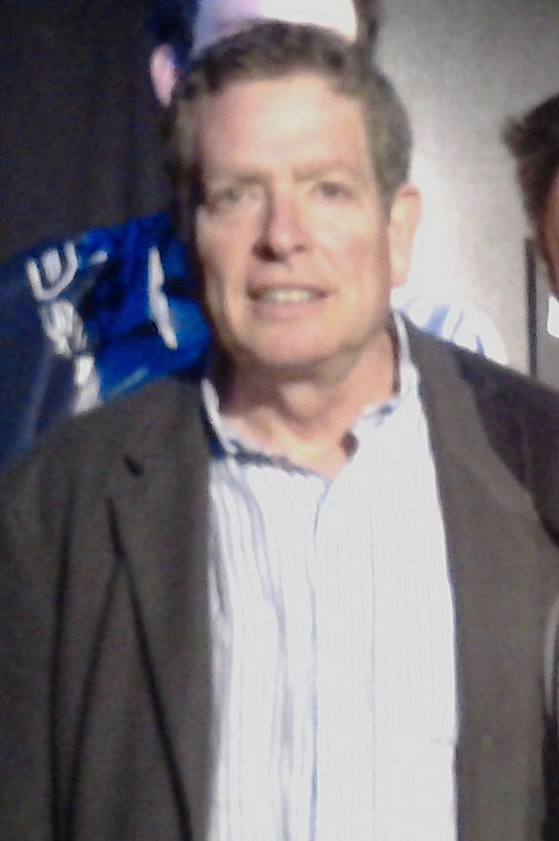
- Zucker in 2016
- Born: David Samuel Zucker; October 16, 1947 (age 79); Milwaukee, Wisconsin, U.S.
- Occupations: Film director, film producer, screenwriter
- Years active: 1976–present
- Spouse: Danielle Ardolino (m. 1997; div. 2019)
- Children: 2
- Family: Jerry Zucker (brother)

David Samuel Zucker (born October 16, 1947) is an American filmmaker. Associated mostly with parody comedies, Zucker is recognized for collaborating with Jim Abrahams and his brother Jerry as part of Zucker, Abrahams and Zucker, with whom he wrote and directed the 1980 film Airplane! and created The Naked Gun franchise. As a solo film director, Zucker has also directed Scary Movie 3 (2003) and Scary Movie 4 (2006).

== Career ==
Zucker's movies include The Kentucky Fried Movie in 1977, Ruthless People in 1986, The Naked Gun in 1988, The Naked Gun 2½: The Smell of Fear in 1991, BASEketball in 1998, Scary Movie 3 in 2003, and its sequel Scary Movie 4 in 2006. Of 18 works with which he is associated, Phone Booth, which he produced in 2002, is the only non-comedic film.

He co-directed several films including Airplane! in 1980 and Top Secret! in 1984; along with his brother, Jerry, and Jim Abrahams, the trio make up the ZAZ team of directors. He has worked with Pat Proft (with whom he first teamed up on the Naked Gun show Police Squad!) and Craig Mazin (writer of three of the five Scary Movies). In 1987, both David and Jerry Zucker through Zucker Brothers Productions signed an agreement with Paramount Pictures for a two-year non-exclusive production agreement and development deal with the studio, and the brothers had anticipated on making four comedies for Paramount Pictures during the life of the pact. The first film was a feature film version of the early 1980s television show Police Squad!, which was originally cancelled after six episodes on the air.

ZAZ and Proft helped develop the parody genre of films, in which jokes are spit out with rapid-fire, using puns, physical humor, wit, and double entendres. Some of the veteran actors of ZAZ's vision of parody include Leslie Nielsen, Lloyd Bridges, Charlie Sheen, and Julie Hagerty.

Looking back on his career in 2009, Leslie Nielsen said the best film he appeared in was The Naked Gun, and that David was his favorite director to work with. Nielsen said of him, "He came to me one time and said, 'Leslie, I'll never make you do anything that is not funny.' ... he kept his word." Most consider his greatest work to be Airplane!, which has brought on many accolades (including preservation in the National Film Registry by the Library of Congress).

In his movies, his mother, Charlotte, often made cameos (like the lady trying to put on make-up in Airplane! and Vincent Ludwig's secretary, Dominique, in The Naked Gun: From the Files of Police Squad!).

David Zucker is an aficionado of Davy Crockett and collects memorabilia. He has said that his dream project is to make a biographical film, which he has spent time developing. During the 1990s he regularly hosted a Davy Crockett Rifle Frolic at his ranch in Ojai, California. Zucker wrote 11 updated verses to the song "The Ballad of Davy Crockett", which he claimed in 1992 that he had worked harder on than on any of his scripts. He made a cameo appearance in The Naked Gun 2½ dressed as Crockett.

Zucker began to focus more on politics starting in 2004 when he began working on political ads for the Republican Party. In 2008, he made the political parody movie An American Carol. In 2015, he made a video he called Side Effects attacking President Barack Obama for the Iran nuclear deal in the form of a parody prescription drug ad. In 2017, Zucker said that he was working on a script for a fourth Naked Gun film with Pat Proft. In 2018 he made a cameo appearance on the hidden camera TV series Impractical Jokers, where he was on FaceTime with cast member James Murray in a sketch trying to make the other person laugh.

In 2021, Zucker announced his return to filmmaking with a new spoof film titled The Star of Malta.

== Personal life ==
Zucker was born to a Jewish family in Milwaukee, Wisconsin, the son of Charlotte Zucker and Burton C. Zucker, who was a real estate developer. He graduated from Shorewood High School. In 1997, David married Danielle Zucker, with whom he has two children, Charles and Sarah. He and Danielle were divorced in 2019, although they had been separated for ten years before that. His younger brother, Jerry, is his filmmaking partner. The Zucker brothers have a sister, Susan Breslau, who along with their parents has had numerous appearances in their films. When asked in a September 2014 interview by the BBC if he believes in God, David replied:

Oh yeah, I believe in God. I think there's much more evidence that there is a God than that there isn't. I don't believe that Mother Teresa and Hitler go to the same place. I believe in justice, maybe not in this life, but there has to be justice. And if there isn't a God, I think it would be very depressing. I'd prefer to believe there is.

=== Environmentalism ===
David Zucker has been an active supporter of TreePeople since 1988 and is now the longest continuously serving board member (1990) in the organization's history.

He has been an advocate of solar-powered and electric cars since the '90s. "I can't complain about the smog in Los Angeles if I'm contributing to it," Zucker said to the Sun Sentinel in 1990.

== Recurring cast members ==
Among all of his directed and/or produced parody films, Zucker had frequently cast the late Leslie Nielsen.

Actor	Airplane!	Ruthless People	Naked Gun: From the Files of Police Squad!	The Naked Gun 2½: The Smell of Fear	BASEketball	My Boss' Daughter	Scary Movie 3	Scary Movie 4	An American Carol	Scary Movie 5
Anthony Anderson							X mark	X mark		
Carmen Electra						X mark		X mark		
Anna Faris							X mark	X mark		
Regina Hall							X mark	X mark		
Kevin Hart							X mark	X mark		
George Kennedy			X mark	X mark						
Michael Madsen						X mark		X mark		
Kareem Abdul-Jabbar	X mark				X mark					
Robert Stack	X mark				X mark					
Jenny McCarthy					X mark		X mark			
Edward Moss							X mark	X mark		
Leslie Nielsen	X mark		X mark	X mark			X mark	X mark	X mark	
Priscilla Presley			X mark	X mark						
Bill Pullman		X mark						X mark		
Simon Rex							X mark	X mark	X mark	X mark
Molly Shannon						X mark		X mark		X mark
Charlie Sheen							X mark	X mark		X mark
O. J. Simpson			X mark	X mark						
Ed Williams			X mark	X mark						

== Filmography ==
=== Film ===
Year	Title	Director	Writer	Producer	Notes
1977	The Kentucky Fried Movie	No	Yes	No	with Jim Abrahams & Jerry Zucker
1980	Airplane!	Yes	Yes	Executive	with Jim Abrahams & Jerry Zucker
1984	Top Secret!	Yes	Yes	Executive	with Jim Abrahams & Jerry Zucker
1986	Ruthless People	Yes	No	No	with Jim Abrahams & Jerry Zucker
1988	The Naked Gun: From the Files of Police Squad!	Yes	Yes	Executive	
1991	The Naked Gun 2½: The Smell of Fear	Yes	Yes	No	
1993	For Goodness Sake	Yes	Yes	Yes	Short film
1994	Naked Gun 33 1/3: The Final Insult	No	Yes	Yes	
1996	High School High	No	Yes	Yes	
1998	BASEketball	Yes	Yes	Yes	Also executive music producer
2003	My Boss's Daughter	Yes	Uncredited	No	Wrote early draft screenplay
2003	Scary Movie 3	Yes	Uncredited	No	
2006	Scary Movie 4	Yes	No	No	
2008	An American Carol	Yes	Yes	Yes	
2013	Scary Movie 5	Uncredited	Yes	Yes	Directed additional scenes
TBA	The Star of Malta	Yes	Yes	Yes	

As producer only

- A Walk in the Clouds (1995)
- Phone Booth (2002)
- The Onion Movie (2008)
- Superhero Movie (2008)

As executive producer only

- Brain Donors (1992)
- For Goodness Sake II (1996)

Acting roles

Year	Title	Role	Note
1977	The Kentucky Fried Movie	Man / Technician #2 / Grunwald	
1980	Airplane!	Ground Crewman #2	
1984	Top Secret!	German Soldier in Prop Room	
1991	The Naked Gun 2½: The Smell of Fear	Davy Crockett	
1994	Naked Gun 33 1/3: The Final Insult	Teleprompter Guy	
1995	Your Studio and You	Himself	Short film
1998	BASEketball	Man with Shooting Hot Dog	
2006	Scary Movie 4	Zoltar the Puppet	Voice role
2013	Scary Movie 5	Packer Fan	

Other credits

Year	Title	Role	Notes
2016	O.J.: Made in America	Himself	Documentary
2019	MOSSAD!	Creative consultant	

=== Television ===
Year	Title	Creator	Producer	Writer	Director	Notes
1976	Big John, Little John	No	No	Yes	No	Episode "Abracadabra"
1982	Police Squad!	Yes	Executive	Yes	Yes	Wrote and directed episode "A Substantial Gift (The Broken Promise)"

Other works

Year	Title	Director	Writer	Producer	Notes
1987	Our Planet Tonight	No	No	Executive	TV movie
2000	H.U.D.	Yes	Yes	Executive	Unaired TV series pilot
2000	Absolutely True	No	No	Executive	
2019	Late Night Berlin	No	No	Creative	Episode "Folge 42"

Acting roles

Year	Title	Role	Note
1972	The Tonight Show Starring Johnny Carson	Performer	Part as Kentucky Fried Theater in one episode
1974	The Midnight Special	Performer	Part as Kentucky Fried Theater in one episode
2018	Impractical Jokers	Himself	Episode: "Out of Left Field"
2020	Impractical Jokers: Dinner Party	Himself	Episode: "The Soup's On Episode"

== Songwriter ==
- "Spend This Night With Me" (performed by Val Kilmer in Top Secret!, 1984)
- "I Guess I'm Just Screwed" (performed by Colleen Fitzpatrick in The Naked Gun 2½: The Smell of Fear, 1991)
- "It's Your Birthday" (performed by more actors in High School High, 1996)
