= The Naked Gun 2½: The Smell of Fear =

1991 film directed by David Zucker

- Theatrical release poster
- Directed by: David Zucker
- Written by: David Zucker; Pat Proft
- Based on: Police Squad! by: David Zucker; Jim Abrahams; Jerry Zucker
- Produced by: Robert K. Weiss
- Starring: Leslie Nielsen; Priscilla Presley; George Kennedy; O. J. Simpson; Robert Goulet
- Cinematography: Robert M. Stevens
- Edited by: Christopher Greenbury; James R. Symons
- Music by: Ira Newborn
- Production companies: Paramount Pictures; Zucker/Abrahams/Zucker Productions
- Distributed by: Paramount Pictures
- Release date: June 28, 1991
- Running time: 85 minutes
- Country: United States
- Language: English
- Budget: $23 million
- Box office: $192 million

The Naked Gun 2½: The Smell of Fear is a 1991 American crime comedy film serving as the sequel to the 1988 film The Naked Gun: From the Files of Police Squad!, and the second installment in The Naked Gun film series. The film stars Leslie Nielsen as the comically bumbling Police Lt. Frank Drebin of Police Squad!. Priscilla Presley plays the role of Jane, with O. J. Simpson as Nordberg and George Kennedy as police captain Ed Hocken. The film also features Robert Goulet (who previously made a "special guest star" appearance on Police Squad!) as the villainous Quentin Hapsburg and Richard Griffiths in a dual role as renewable fuel advocate Dr. Albert S. Meinheimer and his evil double. Zsa Zsa Gabor and Mel Tormé have cameo roles.

David Zucker returns from the first entry as director and screenwriter of the film. Jim Abrahams and Jerry Zucker serve as executive producers for the film and receive writing credit due to their contributions to the first entry of the series and the Police Squad! television series. However, neither contributed to the screenplay for the film. The film was a box office success, grossing $192 million against a budget of $23 million, making it the most commercially successful of the series. It received positive reviews from critics, though some concluded it to be inferior to its predecessor. A third installment in the series, Naked Gun 33⅓: The Final Insult, was released in 1994.

== Plot ==
At the White House, President George H. W. Bush announces that he will base the country's energy policy on the recommendations of Dr. Albert Meinheimer. The heads of the coal, oil, and nuclear power industries are upset by the President's decision as Dr. Meinheimer plans to advocate for renewable energy. Jane Spencer, now separated from Frank Drebin, is working late at Dr. Meinheimer's research institute when she spots a suspicious man leaving in a van. A maintenance worker finds a clock with dynamite attached and takes it to the security guards, who accidentally trigger an explosion.

The next morning, Frank is reunited with Jane as he investigates the bombing. He also meets Jane's new boyfriend, Hexagon Oil executive Quentin Hapsburg, and becomes exceedingly jealous. Later that evening, Frank and his boss Ed Hocken meet up at a blues bar. Jane finds Frank at the bar, and they get into an argument, after which Jane storms out. Elsewhere, Hapsburg holds a secret meeting of the energy industry leaders where he reveals his plan for changing Dr. Meinheimer's speech. Hapsburg introduces them to Earl Hacker, a dead ringer for Dr. Meinheimer who will take Dr. Meinheimer's place and deliver a speech recommending more fossil fuels. Dr. Meinheimer is kidnapped by Hapsburg's goons, who tie him up and leave him in a warehouse.

Police Squad tracks down Hector Savage, the man whom Jane saw on the night of the bombing. Savage leads them on a short chase that ends in a standoff at a nearby house. While Savage negotiates with the police, Frank drives a SWAT tank through the house and allows Savage to flee. Frank loses control of the tank and crashes into the city zoo, causing the animals to escape. At a party later that evening, Frank notices that Dr. Meinheimer does not remember meeting him despite having a photographic memory. Frank visits Jane at her apartment after the party and asks if Dr. Meinheimer had been acting strange. After Frank leaves, Savage breaks into Jane's apartment and tries to kill her in the shower. Frank intervenes and kills Savage by shoving a fire hose down his throat and filling him with water until he explodes. Jane realizes she still loves Frank and the two rekindle their romance.

The next day, Police Squad stakes out the warehouse where Dr. Meinheimer is being held captive. Frank tries to sneak into the building but is captured and tied up with Dr. Meinheimer. They are freed by Police Squad and head to the Press Club Dinner to stop Hacker. Jane agrees to open a locked door to let them in, but she is interrupted by Hapsburg. Frank, Ed, Nordberg, and Dr. Meinheimer steal a mariachi band's costumes and sneak inside. Ed captures Hacker and gets a confession from him, causing Hapsburg to take Jane hostage and flee the dinner. Frank pursues Hapsburg to the roof where he learns that Hapsburg has rigged up a small nuclear device which will kill everyone in the building. Frank catches Hapsburg and attempts to learn the bomb's disarming code but Ed throws Hapsburg out a window. Miraculously, Hapsburg bounces off an awning and lands on the sidewalk unscathed, only to be killed by an escaped lion from the zoo.

Frank and Jane try to disarm the bomb while Ed and Nordberg go back into the ballroom to evacuate it. Frank finally disarms the bomb at the last second by tripping over and unplugging the power cord. Frank is commended by the President, who offers him a special post as head of a new Federal Bureau of Police Squad. Frank declines and instead proposes marriage to Jane, which she accepts.

== Cast ==
- Leslie Nielsen as Lieutenant Frank Drebin of Police Squad. Drebin is investigating the bombing of a building which leads him back to his former lover Jane and her new boyfriend Quentin Hapsburg.
- Priscilla Presley as Jane Spencer, Frank's love interest from the previous movie. She becomes torn between her feelings for Frank and her beau Quentin Hapsburg.
- George Kennedy as Captain Ed Hocken, Frank's supervisor at Police Squad.
- O. J. Simpson as Detective Nordberg, Frank's bumbling partner.
- Robert Goulet as Quentin Hapsburg, owner of Hexagon Oil and the main antagonist. He plans to replace Dr. Meinheimer with a duplicate who will recommend that the U.S. remain dependent on fossil fuels and nuclear power instead of switching to renewable energy.
- Richard Griffiths as Dr. Albert S. Meinheimer and Earl Hacker. Dr. Meinheimer is selected by the President to plan a new energy policy for the United States, while Hacker is a duplicate of Dr. Meinheimer hired to impersonate him and deliver a different policy.
- Anthony James as Hector Savage, a goon working for Quentin Hapsburg.
- Jacqueline Brookes as Commissioner Anabell Brumford
- Lloyd Bochner as Terence Baggett, head of the Society of Petroleum Industry Leaders (SPIL).
- Tim O'Connor as Donald Fenswick, Chairman of the Society for More Coal Energy (SMOKE).
- Peter Mark Richman as Arthur Dunwell, Chairman of the Key Atomic Benefits Office of Mankind (KABOOM).
- Ed Williams as Ted Olsen
- John Roarke as President George H. W. Bush
- Margery Ross as First Lady Barbara Bush
- Peter Van Norden as John H. Sununu, Chief of Staff
- Gail Neely as Winnie Mandela

Additionally, Colleen Fitzpatrick plays the Blues Singer at The Blues Note. Mel Tormé and Zsa Zsa Gabor appear as themselves. "Weird Al" Yankovic, who had an appearance as himself in the first film, plays a criminal at the police station. Gina Mastrogiacomo portrays the sex shop worker. The Chicago Bears players are portrayed by Lee Terri, Claude Jay McLin, Manny Perry, and Alex Zimmerman. Raynor Scheine also appears, delivering his line, "You're on my groin."

== Production ==
Despite being set in Washington, D.C., production took place in the Greater Los Angeles area between November 1990 and March 1991, alongside the Jim Abrahams comedy Hot Shots! which came out the same year.

== Music ==
As with the first Naked Gun film, the original music for the second installment was composed and orchestrated by veteran soundtrack composer Ira Newborn, including the big-band theme for the Naked Gun/Police Squad! franchise. Several of the orchestral movements revolve around two other Newborn pieces: "Drebin - Hero!" (used at the top of the pre-credit sequence, from the Paramount-logo animation onward) and the romantic "Thinking of Him" (immediately after the credits). Seasoned Broadway and film singer/actress Colleen Fitzpatrick plays a saloon singer at a sad-sack restaurant called the Blue Note, to which a depressed Detective Lieutenant Drebin repairs after seeing his former girlfriend Jane Spencer being wooed by the villain Quentin Hapsburg.

== Soundtrack ==
The Naked Gun 2½: The Smell of Fear (Original Soundtrack)

Soundtrack album by Ira Newborn
- Released: 1991
- Recorded: 1991
- Genre: Big Band
- Length: 35:46
- Label: Varèse Sarabande
- Producer: Ira Newborn; Robert Townson (executive producer)

In conjunction with the second Naked Gun film, Varèse Sarabande released a soundtrack combining the best Newborn compositions from the first two films. The full scores for The Naked Gun trilogy, along with source music and alternate cues as bonus material, was released in 2014 by La-La-Land Records.

== Reception ==
=== Box office ===
The Naked Gun 2½: The Smell of Fear knocked Robin Hood: Prince of Thieves from the top spot at the box office. It grossed $86.9 million in the United States and Canada and did even better internationally, grossing $105 million for a worldwide total of $192 million against a reported budget of $23 million. It was the 10th best performing movie of 1991 in the United States.

=== Critical response ===
On Rotten Tomatoes, the film holds an approval rating of 76% based on 110 reviews, with an average rating of 6.5/10. The website's critical consensus reads, "Naked Gun 2½: The Smell of Fear delivers a handful of moderate laughs, but overall, its strained antics pale in comparison to its gut-busting predecessor." On Metacritic, the film holds a weighted average score of 65 out of 100, based on 21 critics, indicating "generally favorable reviews". Owen Gleiberman of Entertainment Weekly awarded it a B+, but observed that in some ways, it was "the most predictable of the ZAZ films." In the Los Angeles Times, Kenneth Turan stated that the funniest things about the movie were the title, the credits, and the key art.
