= Ring of Fear (A Dangerous Assignment) =

- Police Squad! episode
- One of the many headlines
- Episode no.: Season 1 Episode 2
- Directed by: Joe Dante
- Story by: David Misch
- Teleplay by: Tino Insana: Robert Wuhl
- Original air date: March 11, 1982

Guest appearances
- Georg Stanford Brown (special guest star); Rudy Solari as Montague Martin; Patrick St. Esprit as Buddy Briggs; Tessa Richarde as Mary; Floyd Levine as Saul Cooper; Irwin Keyes as Luca Burnett; Grand L. Bush as The Champ

Episode chronology
← Previous "A Substantial Gift (The Broken Promise)"	Next → "Rendezvous at Big Gulch (Terror in the Neighborhood)"

"Ring of Fear (A Dangerous Assignment)" is the second episode of the TV series Police Squad!. It was directed by Joe Dante, written by Tino Insana and Robert Wuhl and produced by Robert K. Weiss.

== Plot ==
The story begins during a boxing match, which is won by boxer Mike Schultz. However, the fight was fixed and Schultz was supposed to deliberately lose the match, much to the annoyance of crime boss Montague Martin, who lost money betting on the outcome of the fight. In retaliation, Martin sends his goon Luca Burnett to kill Schultz. Investigators initially rule the death a suicide, but Captain Ed Hocken isn't convinced that a boxer would kill himself right after the biggest win of his career. Believing that they are dealing with murder and corruption, Ed decides to send Frank Drebin undercover. The plan is to find a good boxer and straighten him up to draw the interest of Martin.

At a local gym ("Jim's Gym"), Frank meets Buddy Briggs, a talented up-and-coming boxer whose rise to prominence has been thwarted by Martin's fixing of fights in the city. Frank wants to manage Buddy, but needs Buddy's management contract for it. Frank seeks out Buddy's corrupt manager Saul Cooper, who is in league with Martin and was also Schultz's manager. He barges into a private poker game with Cooper and his cronies, and ultimately (with a full house and his revolver as his ace-in-the-hole) gets Buddy's contract.

=== Act II: Bruté ===
Act II: Bruté.

Later at the Police Squad crime lab, scientist Ted Olsen shows Frank and Ed some facial hair belonging to Luca Burnett recovered from the Schultz crime scene. Frank visits Buddy's apartment, where he meets Buddy's wife, Mary, who is angry with her husband for being Martin's puppet, leaving Buddy dejected. Frank promises to help Buddy fight fair and win.

Buddy and Frank decide to meet at Morey's Bar in the evening, to arrange a fight with "The Champ", who is managed by Cooper and Martin. Frank tries to goad Martin into agreeing to a fight between Buddy and The Champ, but both refuse. Believing that a fight will never happen, Buddy prepares to leave. The Champ takes offense and tries to hit Buddy, but Buddy knocks him down. With that, a boxing match between Buddy and The Champ is on.

The evening of the fight, Martin walks into Buddy's dressing room and tells him that he has kidnapped Mary. He threatens her safety unless Buddy takes a dive in the 12th round, and shows him Mary's toaster to prove he's not bluffing. Frank promises the upset Buddy that he will find Mary, but needing answers fast, he goes to see Johnny the shoe shiner and police informant. Johnny tells Frank that Mary is being held hostage by Burnett at Jim's Gym. As Frank arrives, Mary has already escaped her bindings and tries to escape. Burnett catches her and drags her into a steam room at gunpoint. A shootout between Frank and Burnett begins, completely obscured by the steam, but Frank eventually prevails.

During the boxing match, Martin keeps showing Buddy household appliances belonging to Mary to prove he still has her. Buddy is knocked down by The Champ, but then Mary enters the arena. On seeing her safe, a reinvigorated Buddy jumps up and knocks out The Champ with a single punch. At the end of the match, Buddy and Mary embrace, and Buddy calls out Martin for his crimes in front of the reporters. Martin tries to leave the arena, but Ed and Frank arrest him.

=== Epilogue ===
At the station, Frank and Ed discuss the case, and Martin is brought in wearing handcuffs. Frank says that Martin will have to do his fight fixing from the Statesville Prison from now on.

== Recurring jokes ==
- Tonight's special guest star: Georg Stanford Brown, dressed in the uniform of a police officer, cautiously walking a city street with his gun drawn. He is promptly killed off, Police Squad! style, by a falling safe. Brown would subsequently direct the episode "The Butler Did It".
- Next week's experiment: "...remember to bring three things from your mother's dresser."
- Johnny's next customer: A heart surgeon needing help with a patient's bypass operation.
- Freeze frame gag: Everyone freezes but Martin. He realizes what is happening and attempts to escape, but finds the door is blocked. With no other way out, he ultimately tries to make his way through the front (towards the viewer) but can't make his way past the camera lens.

== Notes ==
- When Frank enters Cooper's poker game, he introduces himself as Bob Kelly with a lot of "long green", i.e., money to gamble with, which is misinterpreted by one of Cooper's cronies as Lorne Greene. Incidentally, Greene was the "guest star" of Police Squad!'s first episode.
- Mary's rebuke of Buddy being a bum who could have been a contender is a spoof of a famous quote from On the Waterfront.
