= Ed Williams (actor) =

American actor (1926–2025)

- Born: November 26, 1926; San Jose, California, U.S.
- Died: October 2, 2025 (aged 98); Los Angeles, California, U.S.
- Occupation(s): Actor, comedian
- Years active: 1941–2010
- Notable work: Police Squad!; The Naked Gun

Edwin Wallace Williams (November 26, 1926 – October 2, 2025) was an American actor and comedian, who played Ted Olsen on the TV series Police Squad! and in The Naked Gun films.

== Life and career ==
Williams was born in San Jose, California, on November 26, 1926. He was a broadcasting and speech teacher at Los Angeles City College in Southern California. He retired and then took acting classes. With the help of some contacts, he started acting as a second career.

He was best known for his role as Ted Olsen on the TV series Police Squad! and in The Naked Gun films: The Naked Gun: From the Files of Police Squad! (1988), The Naked Gun 2½: The Smell of Fear (1991) and Naked Gun 33⅓: The Final Insult (1994). Despite the success of The Naked Gun films, Williams only had minor roles in other films, such as The Giant of Thunder Mountain (1991), Father of the Bride (1991) and Carnosaur (1993).

Williams later lived in Los Angeles. He died there on October 2, 2025, at the age of 98.

== Filmography ==
Year	Title	Role	Notes
1982	Police Squad!	Ted Olsen	TV series, 6 episodes
1986	Ratboy	Lake Reporter	
1988	Going to the Chapel	Reverend Morton	
1988	The Naked Gun: From the Files of Police Squad!	Ted Olsen	
1990	L.A. Law	Ed Tobias	
1991	High Strung	Boss	
1991	The Giant of Thunder Mountain	Mr. Macgruder	
1991	The Naked Gun 2½: The Smell of Fear	Ted Olsen	
1991	Father of the Bride	Reverend	
1993	Carnosaur	Dr. Sterling Raven	
1994	Naked Gun 33 1/3: The Final Insult	Ted Olsen	
