= Jim Abrahams =

American film director and writer (1944–2024)

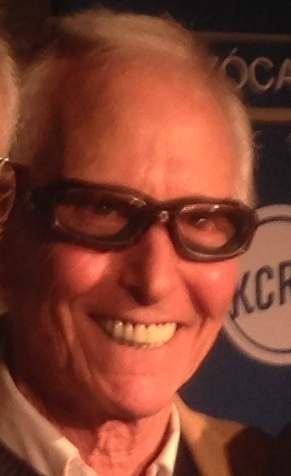
- Abrahams in 2015
- Born: James Steven Abrahams; May 10, 1944; Shorewood, Wisconsin, U.S.
- Died: November 26, 2024 (aged 80); Santa Monica, California, U.S.
- Years active: 1976–2019
- Spouse: Nancy Cocuzzo
- Children: 3

James Steven Abrahams (May 10, 1944 – November 26, 2024) was an American filmmaker. With David and Jerry Zucker, he was best known as a member of Zucker, Abrahams and Zucker.

== Early life ==
James Steven Abrahams was born on May 10, 1944, to a Jewish family in Shorewood, Wisconsin, the son of Louise M. (née Ogens), an educational researcher, and Norman S. Abrahams, a lawyer. He attended Shorewood High School. He had a home in Eagle River, Wisconsin, where he spent summers from the time he was a child.

== Career ==
He is best known for the spoof movies that he co-wrote and produced with brothers Jerry Zucker and David Zucker, such as Airplane! (for which he was nominated for a BAFTA Award for Best Screenplay) and The Naked Gun series. The team of Zucker, Abrahams and Zucker (also referred to as "ZAZ") really began when the three men grew up together in Milwaukee, Wisconsin. He directed movies on his own, such as Big Businessand Hot Shots! and its 1993 sequel, Hot Shots! Part Deux.

== Personal life ==
Abrahams and his wife, Nancy (née Cocuzzo) co-founded The Charlie Foundation To Help Cure Pediatric Epilepsy. He was an advocate of the ketogenic diet as a treatment for epilepsy.

Abrahams had three children. His daughter, Jamie Abrahams, is also a comedy writer.

== Death ==
He died from leukemia at his home in Santa Monica, California, on November 26, 2024, at the age of 80. He had the disease for twenty years before his death and at one point was in remission until it returned.

== Filmography ==
=== Film ===
| Year | Title | Director | Writer | Executive Producer | Notes |
|---|---|---|---|---|---|
| 1977 | The Kentucky Fried Movie | No | Yes | No | |
| 1980 | Airplane! | Yes | Yes | Yes | Co-directed with David and Jerry Zucker |
| 1984 | Top Secret! | Yes | Yes | Yes | Co-directed with David and Jerry Zucker |
| 1986 | Ruthless People | Yes | No | No | Co-directed with David and Jerry Zucker |
| 1988 | Big Business | Yes | No | No | |
| 1988 | The Naked Gun: From the Files of Police Squad! | No | Yes | Yes | |
| 1990 | Welcome Home, Roxy Carmichael | Yes | No | No | |
| 1991 | Hot Shots! | Yes | Yes | No | |
| 1993 | Hot Shots! Part Deux | Yes | Yes | No | |
| 1994 | An Introduction to the Ketogenic Diet | Yes | No | No | Documentary short |
| 1998 | Mafia! | Yes | Yes | No | |
| 2006 | Scary Movie 4 | No | Yes | No | |

Executive producer only

- Cry-Baby (1990)
- The Naked Gun 2½: The Smell of Fear (1991)
- Naked Gun 33⅓: The Final Insult (1994)

Acting roles

| Year | Title | Role |
|---|---|---|
| 1977 | The Kentucky Fried Movie | Technician #1 / Announcer |
| 1980 | Airplane! | Religious Zealot #6 |
| 1984 | Top Secret! | German Soldier in Prop Room |
| 1988 | Coming to America | Face on Cutting Room Floor |
| 1991 | Oscar | Postman |
| 2019 | Fat: A Documentary | Self − Filmmaker & Founder, Charlie Foundation |

=== Television ===
| Year | Title | Director | Writer | Creator | Executive Producer | Notes |
|---|---|---|---|---|---|---|
| 1976 | Big John, Little John | No | Yes | No | No | Episode "Abracadabra" |
| 1997 | ...First Do No Harm | Yes | Yes | No | Yes | TV movie |
| 1982 | Police Squad! | Yes | Yes | Yes | Yes | Wrote and directed episode "A Substantial Gift (The Broken Promise)" with David & Jerry Zucker |
| 2018 | Voice of the Epilepsies | No | No | No | Yes | Documentary film |

Other credits

| Year | Title | Role | Notes |
|---|---|---|---|
| 1972 | The Tonight Show Starring Johnny Carson | Performer | Part as Kentucky Fried Theatre in one episode |
| 1974 | The Midnight Special | Performer | Part as Kentucky Fried Theatre in one episode |
| 2019 | Late Night Berlin | Creative producer | Episode "Folge 42" |
