= Satellite Award for Best Supporting Actress – Series, Miniseries or Television Film =

Annual award of the International Press Academy

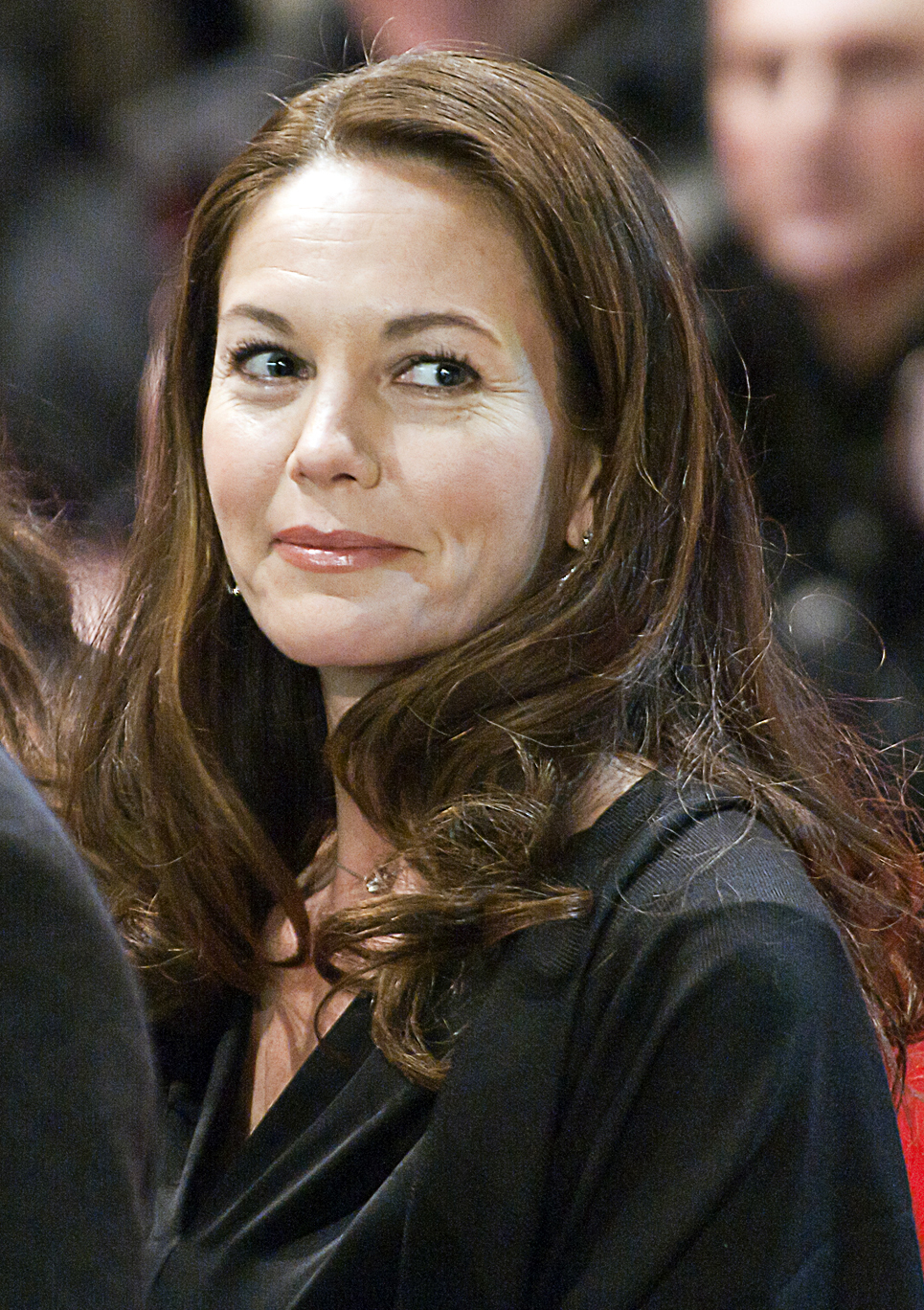
- The 2024 recipient: Diane Lane
- Awarded for: Best Supporting Actress in a Series, Miniseries or Television Film
- Country: United States
- Presented by: International Press Academy
- First award: 1996
- Currently held by: Diane Lane – Feud: Capote vs. The Swans (2024)

The Satellite Award for Best Supporting Actress in a Series, Miniseries, or Television Film is one of the annual Satellite Awards given by the International Press Academy.

== Winners and nominees ==
indicates the winner

=== 1990s ===
Year	Actor	Series	Role	Network
1996	Kathy Bates	The Late Shift	Helen Kushnick	HBO
1996	Gail O'Grady	NYPD Blue	Donna Abandando	ABC
1996	Cher	If These Walls Could Talk	Dr. Beth Thompson	HBO
1996	Greta Scacchi	Rasputin: Dark Servant of Destiny	Tsaritsa Alexandra Feodorovna	HBO
1996	Alfre Woodard	Gulliver's Travels	Queen of Brobdingnag	NBC
1997	Ellen Barkin	Before Women Had Wings	Glory Marie Jackson	ABC
1997	Louise Fletcher	Breast Men	Mrs. Saunders	HBO
1997	Mimi Rogers	Weapons of Mass Distraction	Ariel Powers	HBO
1997	Bernadette Peters	Cinderella	Cinderella's Stepmother	ABC
1997	Mare Winningham	George Wallace	Lurleen Wallace	TNT
1998	Rita Wilson	From the Earth to the Moon	Susan Borman	HBO
1998	Jackie Burroughs	More Tales of the City	Mother Mucca	PBS
1998	Faye Dunaway	Gia	Wilhelmina Cooper	HBO
1998	Amy Madigan	A Bright Shining Lie	Mary Jane Vann	HBO
1998	Shirley Knight	The Wedding	Miss Caroline	ABC
1999	Not presented			

=== 2000s ===
Year	Actor	Series	Role	Network
2000	Not presented			
2001	Julia Ormond	Varian's War	Miriam Davenport	Showtime
2001	Tammy Blanchard	Life with Judy Garland: Me and My Shadows	Young Judy Garland	ABC
2001	Brenda Blethyn	Anne Frank: The Whole Story	Auguste van Pels	ABC
2001	Jill Hennessy	Jackie, Ethel, Joan: The Women of Camelot	Jackie Kennedy	NBC
2001	Lauren Holly	Jackie, Ethel, Joan: The Women of Camelot	Ethel Kennedy	NBC
2002	Helen Mirren	Door to Door	Mrs. Porter	TNT
2002	Sissy Spacek	Last Call	Zelda Fitzgerald	Showtime
2002	Amy Madigan	Just a Dream	Cindy Wilder	Showtime
2002	Queen Latifah	Living with the Dead	Midge Harmon	CBS
2002	Frances Sternhagen	The Laramie Project	Marge Murray	HBO
2003	Justine Bateman	Out of Order	Annie	Showtime
2003	Emma Thompson	Angels in America	Nurse Emily / Homeless Woman / The Angel America	HBO
2003	Mary-Louise Parker	Angels in America	Harper Pitt	HBO
2003	Anne Bancroft	The Roman Spring of Mrs. Stone	Contessa	Showtime
2003	Jayne Atkinson	Our Town	Mrs. Gibbs	Showtime
2003	Jane Curtin	Our Town	Mrs. Webb	Showtime
2004	Anjelica Huston	Iron Jawed Angels	Carrie Chapman Catt	HBO
2004	Helen McCrory	The Last King: The Power and the Passion of King Charles II	Barbara Villiers, Countess of Castlemaine	A&E
2004	Emily Watson	The Life and Death of Peter Sellers	Anne Sellers	HBO
2004	Mary Stuart Masterson	Something the Lord Made	Helen B. Taussig	HBO
2004	Gina McKee	The Lost Prince	Charlotte "Lalla" Bill	BBC One
2005	Lisa Edelstein	House	Dr. Lisa Cuddy	Fox
2005	Shohreh Aghdashloo	24	Dina Araz	Fox
2005	Jane Alexander	Warm Springs	Sara Delano Roosevelt	HBO
2005	Polly Walker	Rome	Atia of the Julii	HBO
2005	Camryn Manheim	Elvis	Gladys Presley	CBS
2005	Sandra Oh	Grey's Anatomy	Cristina Yang	ABC
2006	Julie Benz	Dexter	Rita Bennett	Showtime
2006	Laurie Metcalf	Desperate Housewives	Carolyn Bigsby	ABC
2006	Vanessa Williams	Ugly Betty	Wilhelmina Slater	ABC
2006	Fionnula Flanagan	Brotherhood	Rose Caffee	Showtime
2006	Elizabeth Perkins	Weeds	Celia Hodes	Showtime
2006	Jean Smart	24	Martha Logan	Fox
2007	Vanessa Williams	Ugly Betty	Wilhelmina Slater	ABC
2007	Polly Bergen	Desperate Housewives	Stella Wingfield	ABC
2007	Rachel Griffiths	Brothers and Sisters	Sarah Walker	ABC
2007	Judy Davis	The Starter Wife	Joan McAllister	USA Network
2007	Jaime Pressly	My Name Is Earl	Joy Turner	NBC
2007	Chandra Wilson	Grey's Anatomy	Miranda Bailey	ABC
2008	Fionnula Flanagan	Brotherhood	Rose Caffe	Showtime
2008	Chandra Wilson	Grey's Anatomy	Miranda Bailey	ABC
2008	Kristin Chenoweth	Pushing Daisies	Olive Snook	ABC
2008	Laura Dern	Recount	Katherine Harris	HBO
2008	Sarah Polley	John Adams	Abigail Adams Smith	HBO
2008	Dianne Wiest	In Treatment	Gina Toll	HBO
2009	Jane Lynch	Glee	Sue Sylvester	Fox
2009	Cherry Jones	24	Allison Taylor	Fox
2009	Judy Parfitt	Little Dorrit	Mrs. Clennam	PBS
2009	Anika Noni Rose	The No. 1 Ladies' Detective Agency	Grace Makutsi	HBO
2009	Chloë Sevigny	Big Love	Nicolette "Nicki" Grant	HBO
2009	Vanessa Williams	Ugly Betty	Wilhelmina Slater	ABC

=== 2010s ===
Year	Actor	Series	Role	Network
2010	Brenda Vaccaro	You Don't Know Jack	Margaret "Margo" Janus	HBO
2010	Julie Bowen	Modern Family	Claire Dunphy	ABC
2010	Rose Byrne	Damages	Ellen Parsons	FX
2010	Sharon Gless	Burn Notice	Madeline Westen	USA Network
2010	Jane Lynch	Glee	Sue Sylvester	Fox
2010	Elisabeth Moss	Mad Men	Peggy Olson	AMC
2010	Catherine O'Hara	Temple Grandin	Aunt Ann	HBO
2010	Archie Panjabi	The Good Wife	Kalinda Sharma	CBS
2011	Vanessa Williams	Desperate Housewives	Renee Perry	ABC
2011	Michelle Forbes	The Killing	Mitch Larsen	AMC
2011	Kelly Macdonald	Boardwalk Empire	Margaret Thompson	HBO
2011	Evan Rachel Wood	Mildred Pierce	Veda Pierce	HBO
2011	Margo Martindale	Justified	Mags Bennett	FX
2011	Maya Rudolph	Up All Night	Ava Alexander	NBC
2011	Maggie Smith	Downton Abbey	Violet Crawley, The Dowager Countess of Grantham	PBS
2011	Sofía Vergara	Modern Family	Gloria Pritchett	ABC
2012	Maggie Smith	Downton Abbey	Violet Crawley, The Dowager Countess of Grantham	PBS
2012	Mayim Bialik	The Big Bang Theory	Dr. Amy Farrah Fowler	CBS
2012	Christina Hendricks	Mad Men	Joan Harris	AMC
2012	Sarah Paulson	Game Change	Nicolle Wallace	HBO
2012	Maya Rudolph	Up All Night	Ava Alexander	NBC
2012	Mare Winningham	Hatfields & McCoys	Sally McCoy	History
2013	Laura Prepon	Orange Is the New Black	Alex Vause	Netflix
2013	Kathy Bates	American Horror Story: Coven	Delphine LaLaurie	FX
2013	Margo Martindale	The Americans	Claudia	FX
2013	Uzo Aduba	Orange Is the New Black	Suzanne "Crazy Eyes" Warren	Netflix
2013	Emilia Clarke	Game of Thrones	Daenerys Targaryen	HBO
2013	Anna Gunn	Breaking Bad	Skyler White	AMC
2013	Judy Parfitt	Call the Midwife	Sister Monica Joan	PBS
2013	Merritt Wever	Nurse Jackie	Zoey Barkow	Showtime
2014	Sarah Paulson	American Horror Story: Freak Show	Bette and Dot Tattler	FX
2014	Ann Dowd	The Leftovers	Patricia "Patti" Levin	HBO
2014	Michelle Monaghan	True Detective	Maggie Hart	HBO
2014	Zoe Kazan	Olive Kitteridge	Denise Thibodeau	HBO
2014	Allison Tolman	Fargo	Detective Molly Solverson	FX
2014	Nicola Walker	Last Tango in Halifax	Gillian	BBC One
2015	Rhea Seehorn	Better Call Saul	Kim Wexler	AMC
2015	Catherine Keener	Show Me a Hero	Mary Dorman	HBO
2015	Mo'Nique	Bessie	Ma Rainey	HBO
2015	Regina King	American Crime	Aliyah Shadeed	ABC
2015	Helen McCrory	Penny Dreadful	Evelyn Poole	Showtime
2015	Julie Walters	Indian Summers	Cynthia Coffin	PBS
2016	Rhea Seehorn	Better Call Saul	Kim Wexler	AMC
2016	Olivia Colman	The Night Manager	Angela Burr	AMC
2016	Lena Headey	Game of Thrones	Cersei Lannister	HBO
2016	Maggie Siff	Billions	Wendy Rhoades	Showtime
2016	Maura Tierney	The Affair	Helen Butler	Showtime
2016	Alison Wright	The Americans	Martha Hanson	FX
2017	Ann Dowd	The Handmaid's Tale	Aunt Lydia Clements	Hulu
2017	Danielle Brooks	Orange Is the New Black	Tasha "Taystee" Jefferson	Netflix
2017	Judy Davis	Feud: Bette and Joan	Hedda Hopper	FX
2017	Laura Dern	Big Little Lies	Renata Klein	HBO
2017	Shailene Woodley	Big Little Lies	Jane Chapman	HBO
2017	Regina King	American Crime	Kimara Walters	ABC
2018	Sharon Stone	Mosaic	Olivia Lake	HBO
2018	Penélope Cruz	The Assassination of Gianni Versace: American Crime Story	Donatella Versace	FX
2018	Jennifer Jason Leigh	Patrick Melrose	Eleanor Melrose	Showtime
2018	Justine Lupe	Mr. Mercedes	Holly Gibney	Audience
2018	Nive Nielsen	The Terror	Lady Silence	AMC
2018	Emma Thompson	King Lear	Goneril	BBC Two
2019	Olivia Colman	Fleabag	Godmother	Prime Video
2019	Patricia Arquette	The Act	Dee Dee Blanchard	Hulu
2019	Alex Borstein	The Marvelous Mrs. Maisel	Susie Myerson	Prime Video
2019	Toni Collette	Unbelievable	Det. Grace Rasmussen	Netflix
2019	Meryl Streep	Big Little Lies	Mary Louise Wright	HBO
2019	Emily Watson	Chernobyl	Ulana Khomyuk	HBO
2019	Naomi Watts	The Loudest Voice	Gretchen Carlson	Showtime

=== 2020s ===
Year	Actor	Series	Role	Network
2020	Tracey Ullman	Mrs. America	Betty Friedan	FX on Hulu
2020	Gillian Anderson	The Crown	Margaret Thatcher	Netflix
2020	Jessie Buckley	Fargo	Oraetta Mayflower	FX
2020	Emma Corrin	The Crown	Diana, Princess of Wales	Netflix
2020	Hope Davis	Your Honor	Gina Baxter	Showtime
2020	Noma Dumezweni	The Undoing	Haley Fitzgerald	HBO
2021	Lisa Edelstein	The Kominsky Method	Phoebe	Netflix
2021	Jenifer Lewis	Black-ish	Ruby Johnson	ABC
2021	Julianne Nicholson	Mare of Easttown	Lori Ross	HBO
2021	Sarah Paulson	Impeachment: American Crime Story	Linda Tripp	FX
2021	Anja Savcic	Big Sky	Scarlet Leyendecker	ABC
2021	Jean Smart	Mare of Easttown	Helen Fahey	HBO
2022	Juno Temple	The Offer	Bettye McCartt	Paramount+
2022	Sally Field	Winning Time: The Rise of the Lakers Dynasty	Jessie Buss	HBO
2022	Cassidy Freeman	The Righteous Gemstones	Amber Gemstone	HBO
2022	Melanie Lynskey	Candy	Betty Gore	Hulu
2022	Cynthia Nixon	The Gilded Age	Ada Brook	HBO
2022	Evan Rachel Wood	Weird: The Al Yankovic Story	Madonna	The Roku Channel
2023	Christina Ricci	Yellowjackets	Misty Quigley	Showtime
2023	Elizabeth Debicki	The Crown	Diana, Princess of Wales	Netflix
2023	J. Smith-Cameron	Succession	Gerri Kellman	HBO
2023	Meryl Streep	Only Murders in the Building	Loretta Durkin	Hulu
2023	Hannah Waddingham	Ted Lasso	Rebecca Welton	Apple TV+
2023	Merritt Wever	Tiny Beautiful Things	Frankie Pierce	Hulu
2024	Diane Lane	Feud: Capote vs. The Swans	Slim Keith	FX/Hulu
2024	Hannah Einbinder	Hacks	Ava Daniels	HBO
2024	Moeka Hoshi	Shōgun	Usami Fuji	FX/Hulu
2024	Nava Mau	Baby Reindeer	Teri	Netflix
2024	Saskia Reeves	Slow Horses	Catherine Standish	Apple TV+
2024	Kristen Schaal	What We Do in the Shadows	The Guide	FX/Hulu
