= Satellite Award for Best Supporting Actress =

Satellite Award for Best Supporting Actress may refer to:

- Satellite Award for Best Supporting Actress - Motion Picture
- Satellite Award for Best Supporting Actress - Series, Miniseries or Television Film
