= Brain Donors =

1992 American film directed by Dennis Dugan

- Theatrical release poster
- Directed by: Dennis Dugan
- Screenplay by: Pat Proft
- Based on: Suggested by A Night at the Opera screenplay by George S. Kaufman and Morrie Ryskind story by James Kevin McGuinness
- Produced by: Gil Netter; James D. Brubaker
- Starring: John Turturro; Bob Nelson; Mel Smith
- Cinematography: David M. Walsh
- Edited by: Malcolm Campbell
- Music by: Ira Newborn; Mark Mothersbaugh
- Production company: Zucker Brothers Productions
- Distributed by: Paramount Pictures
- Release date: April 17, 1992 (United States)
- Running time: 79 minutes
- Country: United States
- Language: English
- Box office: $918,239 (USA)

Brain Donors is a 1992 American slapstick comedy film directed by Dennis Dugan and released by Paramount Pictures, loosely based on the Marx Brothers comedies A Night at the Opera and A Day at the Races (the first two films the Marx Brothers made for Metro-Goldwyn-Mayer after leaving Paramount). The film co-stars John Turturro, Mel Smith, and Bob Nelson in the approximations of the Groucho, Chico, and Harpo roles, with Nancy Marchand in the Margaret Dumont dowager role. It was executive produced by David and Jerry Zucker, through their Zucker Brothers Productions.

== Plot ==
After the death of tycoon and philanthropist Oscar Winterhaven Oglethorpe, a ballet company is founded in his name by his widow, Lillian. Ambulance-chasing attorney Roland T. Flakfizer competes against Oglethorpe's former attorney, Edmund Lazlo, to be director of the company. Lazlo is chosen for the position after signing the greatest ballet dancer in the world, Roberto "The Great” Volare. Flakfizer — with assistance from his two associates Rocco and Jacques — earns a spot as co-director by wooing the wealthy widow and by signing the company's leading ballerina and her dancer boyfriend Alan Grant. The ensuing struggle between Flakfizer and Lazlo leads to comic hijinks, including a badger game involving a chorus girl and an opening-night performance ludicrously sabotaged by Flakfizer and his cohorts.

== Cast ==
- John Turturro as Roland T. Flakfizer
- Bob Nelson as Jacques
- Mel Smith as Rocco Melonchek
- George de la Peña as Roberto "the Great" Volare
- John Savident as Edmund Lazlo
- Nancy Marchand as Lillian Oglethorpe
- Juli Donald as Lisa LeBaron
- Spike Alexander as Alan Grant
- Teri Copley as Tina

Minor roles include Eddie Griffin as a messenger, Franklin Cover as a doctor, Thomas Mikal Ford and Matthew Sussman as cops, Katherine LaNasa as a dancer, Billy Beck as a janitor, Sam Krachmalnick as a conductor, and Max Alexander as a stage manager.

== Production ==
=== Development ===
Dennis Dugan began work on the film shortly after screening a rough cut of his film Problem Child for David Zucker. Soon after meeting to compare notes, Zucker sent Dugan a script by Pat Proft, and work began on the project in earnest. Initially, Proft was to be a co-producer and frequent Zucker brothers collaborator Jim Abrahams was to be a co-writer, but Abrahams was ultimately not credited as a screenwriter.

=== Casting ===
Dugan originally sought to cast Adam Sandler in the film, but the studio did not agree to it; however, this established a rapport with Sandler that led to Dugan directing several films with him. Dugan also stated that he unsuccessfully pursued Chris Farley and Jim Carrey for the lead role of Roland T. Flakfizer.

=== Filming ===
Principal photography began on December 10, 1990, and the film was largely shot in and around Los Angeles: Greystone Mansion (interiors); Los Angeles Herald-Examiner building, Echo Park Lake (exteriors), and the Warner Grand Theatre. Portions of the film were shot in Pasadena, California, at the Arden Villa (also called the Morton Estate) (exteriors), which was also a location where the Marx Brothers' Duck Soup was shot.

The project was filmed under the title Lame Ducks, but Paramount later changed the title to Brain Donors because it was "catchier", according to sources consulted by the Los Angeles Times.

The film's extended closing setpiece is a pastiche of Tchaikovsky ballet pieces, most notably Swan Lake (parodied in the film as Tears of the Swan). The choreographer for the film's dance scenes was John Carrafa. Costuming was handled by Robert Turturice. Mickey Gilbert was the stunt coordinator; Max Balchowsky and Ric Roman Waugh (credited as Rick Waugh) were among the stuntmen involved in production. The opening credits and closing scene of the film are claymation sequences designed by Will Vinton. The film is scored by Ira Newborn; Mark Mothersbaugh contributed the main and end titles and additional music.

== Release ==
Initially scheduled for release on July 26, 1991, the film was held back from distribution and the release date was not rescheduled. Multiple news reports noted the imminent departure of David and Jerry Zucker, whose contract with Paramount expired in August 1991, as a likely reason. According to co-star Bob Nelson, Paramount was bitter about the Zucker brothers' departure for Columbia Pictures and said, "Why should we promote their career?" He recalled that Brain Donors had been scheduled for a major marketing campaign worthy of a blockbuster summertime comedy, with the studio assigning 18 publicists to the film. After the studio's decision to dump the film, the marketing staff was cut back to only one publicist. "Paramount spent $20 million on [the production], so I figured it was going to be a nice, big release," said Nelson. "Paramount just kind of threw it out there and it flattened out real quick, because they didn't advertise the thing." John Turturro was also frustrated with the project, as reported by the Chicago Tribune, and declined to promote it.

After being shelved for nine months, Brain Donors finally opened in theaters on April 17, 1992. The film was not screened in advance for critics, "an eerie sign that something is afoot." Brain Donors received a very limited release; the studio booked it into only 523 American theaters, and newspaper ads refrained from mentioning the critics' positive reviews.

The advertising invited comparisons to The Three Stooges instead of the Marx Brothers. "This is a Marx Brothers movie through and through", wrote syndicated columnist Joe Baltake. "So what happened? Why is this amiable movie being given a quick sell as a Three Stooges comedy? My hunch is that either the Marx estate objected to the homage or else someone at Paramount figured out that young moviegoers (the only moviegoers who count) don't know who the Marx Brothers are but do know about Moe, Larry, and Curly. Hence the deception. I considered calling Paramount to find out what gives, but frankly. I knew I wouldn't get a straight answer."

== Reception ==
Reviews of the film were mixed. Positive reviewers included Mick LaSalle of the San Francisco Chronicle, who thought that the film was "an audacious attempt actually to make them like they used to - with no apologies, no nostalgia. It's no masterpiece, but neither was every Marx Brothers movie." In her review for The New York Times, Janet Maslin wrote, "Brain Donors will stop at very little to get its laughs, and Mr. Turturro has just the right silliness for the occasion." A positive review in the South Florida Sun-Sentinel noted, "It doesn't have one believable, well-rounded character, it doesn't appeal to our nobler emotions, and it doesn't have anything politically correct to say about any important social problems. These seeming faults, however, are exactly the qualities that make it the most hilarious film yet this year."

Other reviews were less enthusiastic, especially in comparison to the original Marx Brothers films and to the prior films on which the Zucker brothers had worked. Richard Harrington in his review for The Washington Post wrote, "It's all very busy, and in Zucker style there seem to be 10 jokes per minute, but most fly fast and fall flat." Pamela Bruce, writing for the Austin Chronicle, believed the film was too derivative of the Marx Brothers and the Three Stooges, and thought the claymation sequences that bookend the film were more interesting than the actual movie itself. The Los Angeles Daily News described it as "Impudent and manic, yes, in the best Marxian tradition. But it is desperate in its scattered shots at any lame thing for a possible laugh, where the Marxes were always cool and -- for the most part -- surreally inspired when it came to stringing nonsense together." Malcolm Johnson of the Hartford Courant called it a "sometimes clever but ultimately exhausting farce" and noted perplexedly that its title had nothing to do with its subject matter. Variety gave a negative review, remarking, "The title Brain Donors sounds like a horror film and for those expecting a comedy, it is." Entertainment Weekly called it "an almost total failure" and thought "the cheesy sets and breathless pacing give the film the feel of a made-for-TV movie on amphetamines."

A 2005 reevaluation of screenwriter Pat Proft's work wrote approvingly of Brain Donors, remarking, "as a throwback to the Marx/Ritz Brothers ideal of Hellzapoppin' humor, it tried to recapture the bygone days of slapstick and satire, and actually did a terrific job at both."

On the review aggregator website Rotten Tomatoes, 50% of 10 critics' reviews are positive. Metacritic, which uses a weighted average, assigned the film a score of 44 out of 100, based on 8 critics, indicating "mixed or average" reviews.
