= Bob Nelson (comedian) =

American actor and comedian

- Born: March 3, 1958 (age 67); Massapequa, New York, U.S.
- Occupations: Comedian, Actor

Bob Nelson (born March 3, 1958) is an American stand-up comedian and actor.

== Life and career ==
Nelson began doing stand-up in comedy clubs while a theater student at Nassau Community College in the late 1970s.

Nelson specializes in rubber-faced comedy characters. He is also known for his Jacques-Yves Cousteau impersonations and his "football act", in which he parodies the old team rundowns in the College Football All-Star games, wherein players announce their names, numbers, and teams.

Nelson was Rodney Dangerfield's opening act for eight years and was featured in two of Rodney's HBO stand-up comedy showcases, alongside Jerry Seinfeld, Roseanne Barr, Rita Rudner, and Bob Saget. That led to two HBO specials starring Nelson, including "Nelson Schmelson." Nelson was also in a comedy group called "The Identical Triplets" with Eddie Murphy and Rob Bartlett.

Nelson appeared several times on The Tonight Show Starring Johnny Carson and various other talk shows and appeared on tour with Gallagher during 2016–17.

In 2008, Nelson relocated his family and his show to Branson, Missouri, to take a break from the road, where he performed locally for three years. In 2013, Nelson and family returned to Long Island.

In late 2020, Nelson was diagnosed with colon cancer and was undergoing treatment to battle his illness.

Nelson won an Emmy Award in Philadelphia for a children's show he wrote and starred in, called Double Muppet Hold the Onions, in 1983. He also had supporting roles in Nora Ephron's directorial film debut This Is My Life. He also starred in the film Brain Donors, the 1992 update of the Marx Brothers' comedy A Night at the Opera.

== Filmography ==
- Kindergarten Cop (1990) – Henry Shoop
- Nothing Upstairs (1990) – Bob
- This Is My Life (1992) – Ed
- Brain Donors (1992) – Jacques
- Miss Evers' Boys (1997) – Source musician
- The Appleby Sensation (1997) – Linguist
