= James D. Brubaker =

American film producer (1937–2023)

- Born: March 30, 1937; Los Angeles, California, U.S.
- Died: January 3, 2023 (aged 85); Beverly Hills, California, U.S.
- Education: California State University, Los Angeles
- Occupations: Producer; film executive
- Spouse: Marcy Kelly
- Children: 3

James D. Brubaker (March 30, 1937 – January 3, 2023) was an American film producer and production manager. Associated with Chartoff-Winkler Productions for several years, he had producing credits on several of the company's productions, including two films in the Rocky series, as well as True Confessions and The Right Stuff. He later served as president of physical production at Universal Pictures from 2003 to 2008.

== Biography ==
Brubaker was born in Los Angeles to Margaret Hayes Brubaker and Dudley Sutton Brubaker. His family was of Swiss-German descent. He attended California State University, Los Angeles, and served in the U.S. Army. He began working in the film industry as a driver, transporting horses to sets on Western films. For his work on Gia, he won the 1999 Directors Guild of America Award and was nominated for a 1998 Primetime Emmy Award.

Brubaker and his wife, Marcy Kelly, had three children. On January 3, 2023, he died at his home in Beverly Hills, California, from complications of multiple strokes.

== Filmography ==
He was a producer in all films unless otherwise noted.

=== Film ===
Year	Film	Credit	Notes	Ref.
1981	True Confessions	Associate producer		
1982	Rocky III	Associate producer		
1983	The Right Stuff	Executive producer		
1984	Rhinestone	Associate producer		
1985	Beer	Executive producer		
1985	Rocky IV	Executive producer		
1986	Cobra	Executive producer		
1987	Over the Top	Executive producer		
1988	Patty Hearst	Line producer		
1990	Problem Child	Executive producer		
1992	Brain Donors			
1994	Above the Rim	Executive producer		
1995	A Walk in the Clouds	Executive producer		
1996	The Nutty Professor	Co-producer		
1997	Liar Liar	Executive producer		
1999	Life	Executive producer		
2000	Nutty Professor II: The Klumps	Executive producer		
2001	F-Stops	Executive producer		
2001	Her Majesty	Executive producer		
2002	Dragonfly	Executive producer		
2003	Bruce Almighty			
2012	Jayne Mansfield's Car	Executive producer		
2013	Standing Up	Executive producer		
2014	Chef	Executive producer	Final film as a producer	

Production manager

Year	Film	Role
1978	Comes a Horseman	Unit production manager
1978	Uncle Joe Shannon	Production manager
1980	Raging Bull	Production manager
1981	True Confessions	Production manager
1982	Rocky III	Production manager
1983	Staying Alive	Production supervisor Unit production manager
1983	The Right Stuff	Production manager
1984	Rhinestone	Unit production manager
1989	K-9	Unit production manager
1990	Problem Child	Unit production manager
1992	Brain Donors	Unit production manager
1992	Mr. Baseball	Unit production manager
1994	Above the Rim	Unit production manager
1994	D2: The Mighty Ducks	Unit production manager
1995	A Walk in the Clouds	Unit production manager
1997	Liar Liar	Unit production manager Unit production manager: Second unit
1999	Life	Unit production manager
2000	Nutty Professor II: The Klumps	Unit production manager

Transportation department

Year	Film	Role	Notes
1970	The Animals	Transportation captain	
1971	Big Jake	Driver	Uncredited
1971	Diamonds Are Forever	Driver	Uncredited
1971	Harold and Maude	Driver	Uncredited
1972	Lady Sings the Blues	Transportation captain	Uncredited
1972	Thumb Tripping	Insert car driver	Uncredited
1972	Up the Sandbox	Transportation captain	Uncredited
1973	Walking Tall	Transportation coordinator	
1973	Cahill U.S. Marshal	Transportation coordinator	
1974	McQ	Transportation coordinator	
1974	Busting	Transportation captain	
1974	The Godfather Part II	Transportation captain	Uncredited
1975	Against a Crooked Sky	Transportation captain	
1976	Embryo	Transportation coordinator	
1976	Won Ton Ton, the Dog Who Saved Hollywood	Transportation captain	
1976	Nickelodeon	Transportation coordinator	
1977	Capricorn One	Transportation coordinator	

As an actor

Year	Film	Role	Ref.
1999	Life	Judge E.M. Byrne	
2000	Nutty Professor II: The Klumps	Krusty Reporter	

Editorial department

Year	Film	Role
1979	Rocky II	Post-production coordinator

Miscellaneous crew

Year	Film	Role
1977	New York, New York	Assistant to production executive

Thanks

Year	Film	Role
2001	F-Stops	The producers wish to thank
2002	Phone Booth	The producers wish to thank: For their assistance
2005	The Nickel Children	Special thanks
2005	Cry Wolf	The filmmakers wish to express their profound gratitude to
2007	Finishing the Game	Special thanks

=== Television ===
Year	Title	Notes	Ref.
1992	Running Mates	Television film	
1998	Gia	Television film	

Production manager

Year	Title	Role	Notes
1989	The Gifted One	Unit production manager	Television film
1998	Gia	Unit production manager: Second unit, New York	Television film

Transportation department

Year	Title	Role	Notes
1975	The Dead Don't Die	Transportation coordinator	Television film
