= Prince John of the United Kingdom =

British prince (1905–1919)

Prince John
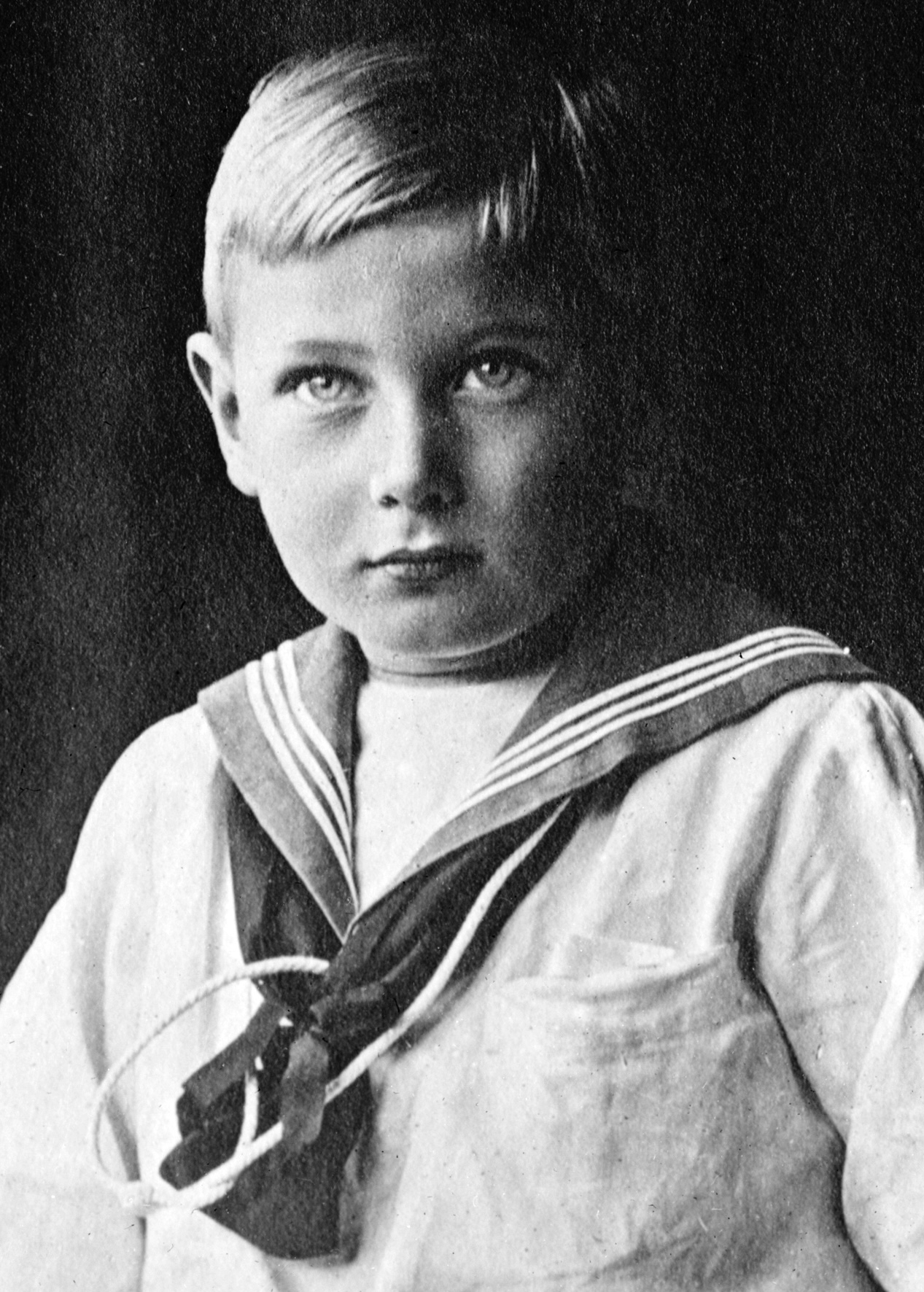
- Photograph by William Harding Lauder, c. 1909
- Born: Prince John of Wales; 12 July 1905; York Cottage, Sandringham, England
- Died: 18 January 1919 (aged 13); Wood Farm, Sandringham, England
- Burial: 21 January 1919; St Mary Magdalene Church, Sandringham
Names
- John Charles Francis
- House: Saxe-Coburg and Gotha (until 1917); Windsor (from 1917) (Note: On 17 July 1917, due to a growing anti-German sentiment in the United Kingdom, George V changed the name of the royal house from the House of Saxe-Coburg and Gotha to the House of Windsor.)
- Father: George V
- Mother: Mary of Teck

Prince John of the United Kingdom (John Charles Francis; 12 July 1905 – 18 January 1919) was the fifth son and youngest of the six children of King George V and Queen Mary. At the time of his birth, his father was heir apparent to John's grandfather Edward VII. In 1910, John's father acceded to the throne upon Edward VII's death, and John became fifth in the line of succession to the British throne.

In 1909, it was discovered that John had epilepsy. In 1916, as his condition deteriorated, he was sent to live at Sandringham House and kept away from the public eye. There, he was cared for by his governess, Charlotte "Lala" Bill, and befriended local children whom his mother had gathered to be his playmates. He died at Sandringham in 1919 after a severe seizure, and was buried at nearby St Mary Magdalene Church. His illness was disclosed to the wider public only after his death.

John's seclusion was subsequently brought forward as evidence of the royal family's inhumanity. However, contrary to the belief that he was hidden from an early age, John was a fully-fledged member of the family for most of his life, appearing frequently in public until after his 11th birthday, when his condition became severe.

== Birth ==
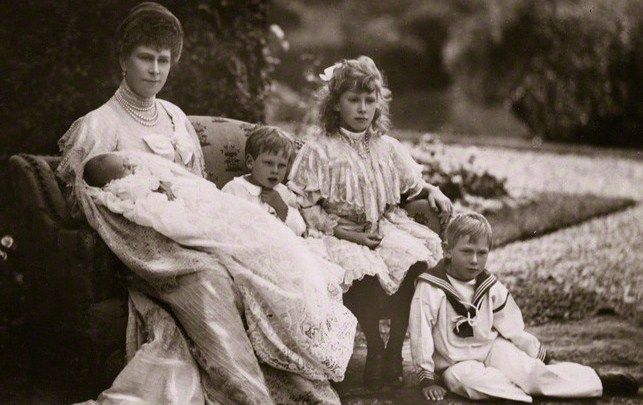
The Princess of Wales with her four youngest children, c. 1905

John was born at 3:05 am on 12 July 1905 at York Cottage on the Sandringham Estate, during the reign of his paternal grandfather, King Edward VII. He was the youngest child and fifth son of George, Prince of Wales (later King George V), and Mary, Princess of Wales (later Queen Mary). He was named John despite the name's traditionally unlucky associations within the royal family, and was informally known as Johnnie. At the time of his birth, he was sixth in the line of succession to the throne, behind his father and four older brothers. As a grandchild in the male line of the reigning British monarch, and a son of the Prince of Wales, he was formally styled His Royal Highness Prince John of Wales from birth until his father's accession to the throne in 1910.

John was christened on 3 August in the parish church of St Mary Magdalene at Sandringham, with the Reverend Canon John Neale Dalton officiating. His godparents were King Carlos I of Portugal; his uncles Prince Carl of Denmark and Alexander Duff, 1st Duke of Fife; his great-granduncle Prince Johann of Schleswig-Holstein-Sonderburg-Glücksburg; and three of his first cousins once removed, the Duke and Duchess of Sparta, and Princess Alice, Countess of Athlone (who was also his aunt-by-marriage). John's father stood proxy for King Carlos, Prince Carl, Prince Johann, and the Duke of Fife, while his aunt Princess Victoria stood proxy for the Duchess of Sparta and Princess Alice.

== Childhood and illness ==
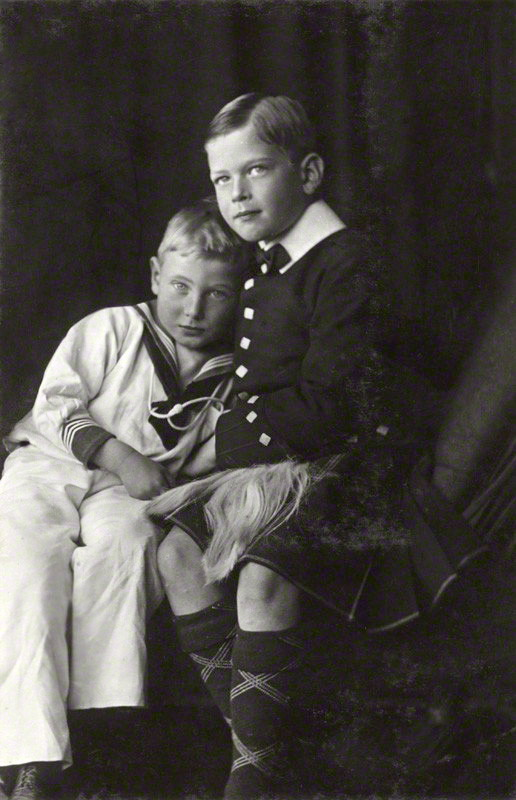
Prince George holding John. Photograph by James Lafayette, 1909.

Much of John's early life was spent at Sandringham with his siblings – Prince Edward (known as David, later King Edward VIII), Prince Albert (known as Bertie, later King George VI), Princess Mary, Prince Henry, and Prince George – under the care of their nanny Charlotte "Lala" Bill. Though a strict disciplinarian, (Note: King George V once stated that "[his] father was frightened of his mother, [he] was frightened of [his] father, and [he was] damned well going to make sure that [his] children are frightened of [him] (Rees 2002, p. 256).) their father was affectionate towards his children, and their mother encouraged them to confide in her. In 1909, John's grandaunt, the Dowager Empress of Russia, wrote to her son Tsar Nicholas II that "George's children are very nice ... The little ones, George and Johnny are both charming and very amusing". John's first cousin once removed and aunt by marriage, Princess Alice, Countess of Athlone described him as "very quaint and one evening when Uncle George returned from stalking he bent over Aunt May and kissed her, and they heard Johnny soliloquize, 'She kissed Papa, ugly old man!'" George V once told U.S. President Theodore Roosevelt that "all [his] children [were] obedient, except John" – apparently because he alone, among the royal children, escaped punishment from their father.

Though a "large and handsome" baby, John had become "winsome" and "painfully slow" by his fourth birthday. That same year, he experienced his first epileptic seizure and began to show signs of a developmental disability. When his father became king, John did not attend his parents' coronation on 22 June 1911, as this was considered too risky for his health; cynics suggested that the family feared their reputation might be damaged by any incident involving him. Although John was deemed not "presentable to the outside world," the king continued to show interest in him, offering him "kindness and affection".

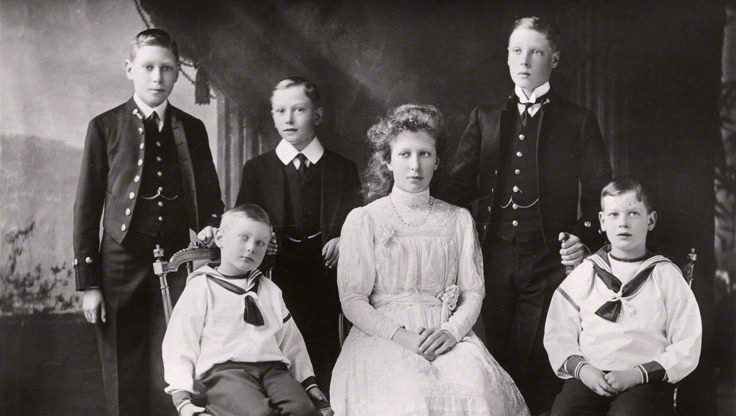
The royal children in 1910: (l-r) Albert, John, Henry, Mary, Edward, and George

During his years at Sandringham, John exhibited repetitive behaviours as well as regular misbehaviour and insubordination; as one account put it, "he simply didn't understand he needed to [behave]."

In 1912, Prince George, John's closest sibling, began St Peter's Court Preparatory School in Broadstairs. The following summer, The Times reported that John would not attend Broadstairs the next term, and that the King and Queen had not yet decided whether to send him to school at all. After the outbreak of World War I, John rarely saw his parents, who were often away on official duties, or his siblings, who were either at boarding school or serving in the military. He gradually disappeared from public view, and no official portraits of him were commissioned after 1913.

== Wood Farm ==
In 1916, as his seizures became more frequent and severe, John was sent to live at Wood Farm, where Bill assumed responsibility for his care. He retained an interest in the world around him and was capable of coherent thought and expression, but his lack of educational progress led to the dismissal of his final tutor, and his formal schooling ended. Physicians warned that he was unlikely to reach adulthood.

At Wood Farm, John became, in the words of one biographer, "a satellite with his own little household on an outlying farm on the Sandringham estate ... Guests at Balmoral remember him during the Great War as tall and muscular, but always a distant figure glimpsed from afar in the woods, escorted by his own retainers." His grandmother Queen Alexandra maintained a garden at Sandringham House especially for him, and it became "one of the great pleasures of [Prince John]'s life."

After the summer of 1916, John was rarely seen outside the Sandringham estate and passed entirely into Bill's care. When Queen Alexandra wrote that John "is very proud of his house but is longing for a companion", Queen Mary departed from usual royal practice by arranging for local children to be brought in as playmates. One of these was Winifred Thomas, a young girl from Halifax who had been sent to live with her aunt and uncle, who managed the royal stables at Sandringham, in the hope that her asthma would improve. John had known Winifred years earlier, before World War I. (Note: Among Winifred's memories of her time at Wood Farm, as recalled by her daughter, was a bicycle race between Prince John and his cousin, Crown Prince Olav of Norway, who could not have been in England during World War I (Zeepvat 2003, p. 4).) They became close, taking nature walks together and working in Queen Alexandra's garden. John also played with his elder siblings during their visits; on one occasion, when his two eldest brothers came to see him, the Prince of Wales "took him for a run in a kind of a push-cart, and they both disappeared from view."

== Death ==
John's seizures intensified, and Bill later wrote "we dared not let him be with his brothers and sister, because it upsets them so much, with the attacks getting so bad and coming so often." Biographer Denis Judd writes that John's "seclusion and "abnormality" must have been disturbing to his brothers and sister", noting that he had been "a friendly, outgoing little boy, much loved by his brothers and sister, a sort of mascot for the family". He spent Christmas Day 1918 with his family at Sandringham House but was driven back to Wood Farm that night.

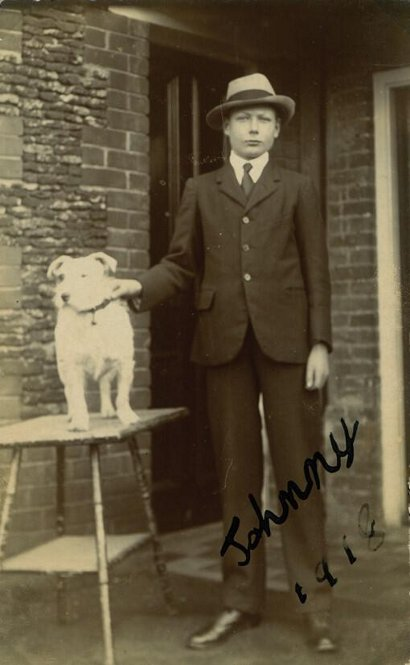
Prince John and his dog in 1918, one year before his death.

On 18 January 1919, after a severe seizure, John died in his sleep at Wood Farm at 5:30 pm, aged 13. Queen Mary wrote in her diary that the news was:

a great shock, tho' for the poor little boy's restless soul, death came as a great relief. [She] broke the news to George and [they] motored down to Wood Farm. Found poor Lala very resigned but heartbroken. Little Johnnie looked very peaceful lying there.

Mary later wrote to Emily Alcock, an old friend, that:

for [John] it is a great relief, as his malady was becoming worse as he grew older, & he has thus been spared much suffering. I cannot say how grateful we feel to God for having taken him in such a peaceful way, he just slept quietly into his heavenly home, no pain no struggle, just peace for the poor little troubled spirit which had been a great anxiety to us for many years, ever since he was four years old.

She added: "The first break in the family circle is hard to bear, but people have been so kind & sympathetic & this has helped us much." George described his son's death as "the greatest mercy possible".

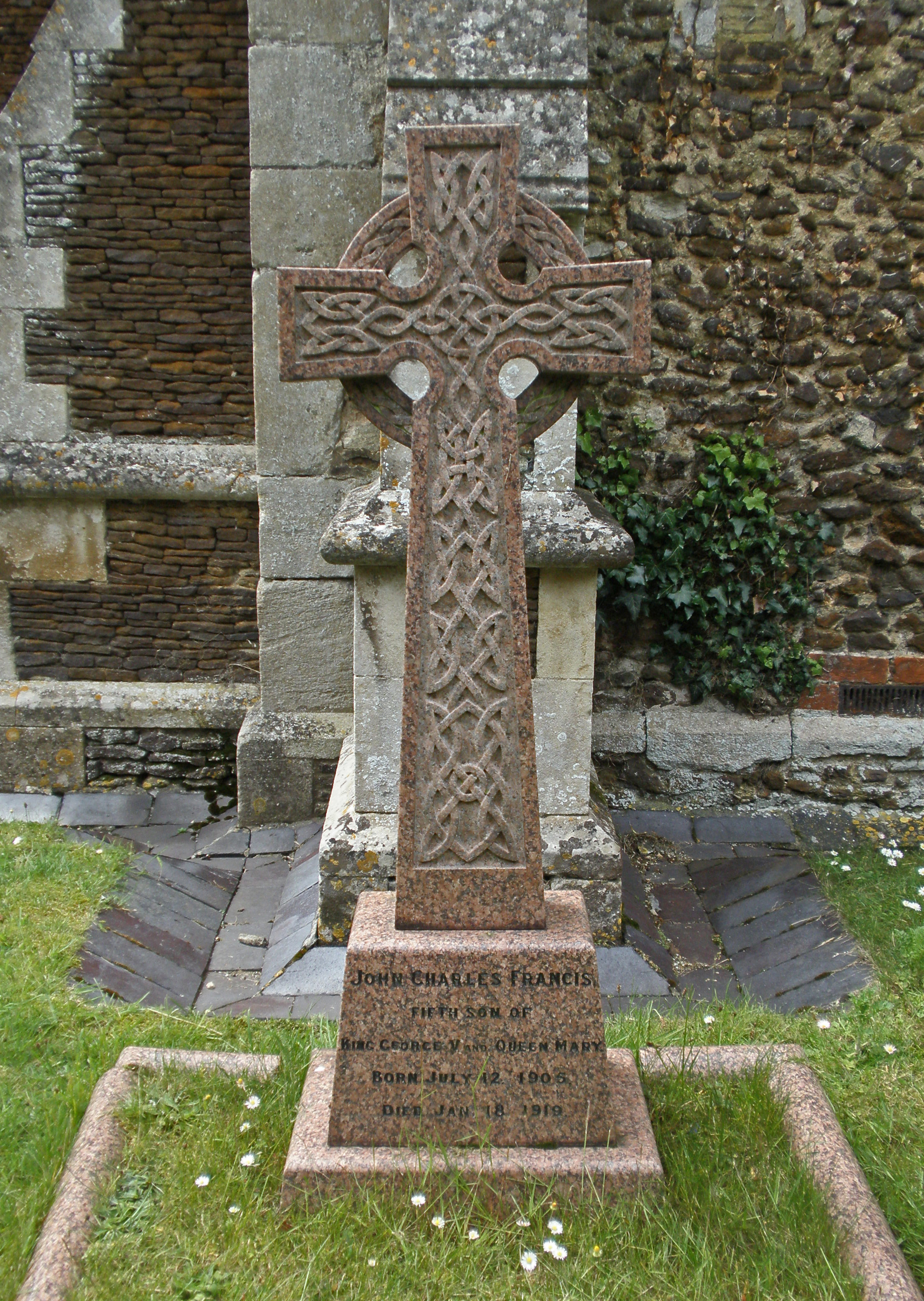
Prince John's grave at St Mary Magdalene parish church, Sandringham

On 20 January, the Daily Mirror reported that "when the Prince passed away his face bore an angelic smile"; the article also made the first public mention of John's epilepsy. His funeral took place the next day at St Mary Magdalene parish church, with John Neale Dalton officiating. It was attended by the Prince's parents, King and Queen, as well as his paternal grandmother, Queen Alexandra, his aunt, Queen Maud, with her son and John's first cousin, future King Olav V of Norway, his other aunt, Princess Victoria, as well as three of his siblings: Princess Mary, Prince Henry, and Prince George.

Queen Mary wrote:

Canon Dalton & Dr Brownhill [John's physician] conducted the service which was awfully sad and touching. Many of our own people and the villagers were present. We thanked all Johnnie's servants who have been so good and faithful to him.

Although nominally private, the funeral was attended by staff from Sandringham House; "every single person on the estate went and stood around the gates and his grave was absolutely covered in flowers." Queen Alexandra wrote to Queen Mary that "now [their] two darling Johnnies lie side by side". (Note: She was referring to her youngest son, Prince Alexander John of Wales, who had died in 1871 one day after birth, and who was also buried at St Mary Magdalene.(Weir 2008, p. 320))

== Legacy ==
Edward, who was 11 years older than John and had hardly known him, regarded his brother's death as "little more than a regrettable nuisance." He wrote an insensitive letter to Queen Mary, now lost, to which she did not reply. He later felt obliged to apologise, writing:

I feel such a cold hearted and unsympathetic swine for writing all that I did ... No one can realise more than you how little poor Johnnie meant to me who hardly knew him ... I feel so much for you, darling Mama, who was his mother.

In her final diary reference to John, Mary wrote simply: "miss the dear child very much indeed." She gave Winifred Thomas several of John's books, inscribed "In memory of our dear little Prince." Bill kept a portrait of John above her mantelpiece, together with a letter from him that read "nanny, I love you." In the 21st century, John's seclusion has been cited as evidence of the Windsors' "heartlessness". A 2008 Channel 4 documentary stated that much of the available information about him is "based on hearsay and rumour, precisely because so few details of his life and his problems have ever been disclosed", and the British Epileptic Association observed:

There was nothing unusual in what [the King and Queen] did. At that time, people with epilepsy were put apart from the rest of the community. They were often put in epilepsy colonies or mental institutions. It was thought to be a form of mental illness...

The association added that it was another 20 years before the idea that people with epilepsy should not be segregated began to take hold.

One author has written that the royal family believed such afflictions might pass through their blood, which was then still regarded as purer than that of a commoner, and therefore wished to conceal as much as possible about John's illness. Others have suggested that John was sent to Wood Farm to provide him with the best environment available under the "austere" conditions of World War I. Another author has stated that the family were "frightened and ashamed of John's illness", while yet another has noted that John's life is "usually portrayed either as tragedy or conspiracy". At the time of Edward VIII's abdication, an attempt was made to discredit Albert, now George VI, by implying that he suffered from falling fits like John. In 1998, the discovery of two volumes of family photographs briefly returned John to public attention.

The Lost Prince, a biographical drama about John's life written and directed by Stephen Poliakoff, was released in 2003.

== Ancestry ==
Ancestors of Prince John of the United Kingdom

8. Prince Albert of Saxe-Coburg and Gotha
4. Edward VII of the United Kingdom
9. Victoria of the United Kingdom
2. George V of the United Kingdom
10. Christian IX of Denmark
5. Princess Alexandra of Denmark
11. Princess Louise of Hesse-Kassel
1. Prince John of the United Kingdom
12. Duke Alexander of Württemberg
6. Francis, Duke of Teck
13. Countess Claudine Rhédey von Kis-Rhéde
3. Princess Victoria Mary of Teck
14. Prince Adolphus, Duke of Cambridge
7. Princess Mary Adelaide of Cambridge
15. Princess Augusta of Hesse-Kassel
