= Gia =

1998 American biographical drama television film

- DVD cover
- Written by: Jay McInerney; Michael Cristofer
- Directed by: Michael Cristofer
- Starring: Angelina Jolie; Faye Dunaway; Mercedes Ruehl; Elizabeth Mitchell
- Composer: Terence Blanchard
- Country of origin: United States
- Original language: English

Production
- Producer: James D. Brubaker
- Cinematography: Rodrigo García
- Editor: Eric A. Sears
- Running time: 126 minutes
- Production company: HBO Pictures
- Budget: $7.9 million

Original release
- Network: HBO
- Release: January 31, 1998

Gia is a 1998 American biographical drama television film about the life and times of one of the first supermodels, Gia Carangi. The film stars Angelina Jolie as Gia and Faye Dunaway as Wilhelmina Cooper, with Mercedes Ruehl and Elizabeth Mitchell. It was directed by Michael Cristofer and written by Cristofer and Jay McInerney. The original music score was composed by Terence Blanchard. The film premiered on January 31, 1998, on HBO.

== Plot ==
Gia Carangi is a Philadelphia native who moves to New York City to become a fashion model and immediately catches the attention of the powerful agent Wilhelmina Cooper. Gia's attitude and beauty help her rise quickly to the forefront of the modeling industry. However, her persistent loneliness, especially after the death of Wilhelmina, drives her to use mood-altering drugs such as cocaine and heroin.

She becomes entangled in a passionate affair with Linda, a make-up artist. Their love affair first starts when both pose nude for a photo shoot and have sex afterward. Gia tries to get clean and begins taking methadone. However, Gia eventually starts using again and Linda gives her an ultimatum. Gia chooses the drugs.

Failed attempts at reconciliation with Linda and with her mother, Kathleen, drive Gia back to heroin. Although she is eventually able to break her drug habit after much effort, she has already contracted HIV from intravenous drug use, which has progressed to AIDS. She spends the remainder of her life in the hospital.

== Cast ==
- Angelina Jolie as Gia Carangi
  - Mila Kunis as Young Gia Carangi
- Faye Dunaway as Wilhelmina Cooper
- Mercedes Ruehl as Kathleen Carangi, Gia's estranged mother
- Elizabeth Mitchell as Linda
- Scott Cohen as Mike Mansfield
- Kylie Travis as Stephanie
- Edmund Genest as Francesco Scavullo
- Alexander Enberg as Chris von Wangenheim
- Louis Giambalvo as Joseph Carangi
- Eric Michael Cole as T.J.
- John Considine as Bruce Cooper
- James Haven as Young Man on Sansom Street
- Rick Batalla as Phillipe
- Brian Donovan as Junkie at Shooting Gallery
- Tricia O'Neil as Vogue Editor
- Sam Pancake as Francesco Stylist #1
- Adina Porter as Girl at Group Therapy
- Michael E. Rodgers as Red Dress Photographer
- Nick Spano as Michael
- Jason Stuart as Booker #2

== Reception ==
=== Critical reception ===
Gia received positive reviews from critics. On the review aggregator website Rotten Tomatoes, 88% of 16 critics' reviews are positive, with an average rating of 7.0/10. Kalamazoo Gazette commented: "Jolie gives it her all in a thoroughly uninhibited and highly effective portrait of a woman living from thrill to thrill." Christopher Null of Filmcritic.com gave the film 3 out of 5 stars. Conversely, Film Freak Central gave the film only 1.5 out of 4 stars and commented: "Gia isn't hagiography, I'll give it that, but it is reductive to a fault."

=== Awards and nominations ===
Year	Award	Category	Nominee(s)	Result	Ref.
1998	Artios Awards	Best Casting for TV Movie of the Week	Junie Lowry Johnson	Won	
1998	Online Film & Television Association Awards	Best Motion Picture Made for Television		Nominated	
1998	Online Film & Television Association Awards	Best Actress in a Motion Picture or Miniseries	Angelina Jolie	Won (Note: Tied with Miranda Richardson for Merlin.)	
1998	Outfest	Outstanding Actress in a Feature Film	Angelina Jolie	Won	
1998	Primetime Emmy Awards	Outstanding Made for Television Movie	Marvin Worth, Ilene Kahn Power, David R. Ginsburg, and James D. Brubaker	Nominated	
1998	Primetime Emmy Awards	Outstanding Lead Actress in a Miniseries or a Movie	Angelina Jolie	Nominated	
1998	Primetime Emmy Awards	Outstanding Writing for a Miniseries or a Movie	Jay McInerney and Michael Cristofer	Nominated	
1998	Primetime Emmy Awards	Outstanding Casting for a Miniseries or a Movie	Libby Goldstein and Junie Lowry Johnson	Nominated	
1998	Primetime Emmy Awards	Outstanding Costume Design for a Miniseries or a Movie	Robert Turturice	Nominated	
1998	Primetime Emmy Awards	Outstanding Single-Camera Picture Editing for a Miniseries or a Movie	Eric A. Sears	Won	
1999	American Cinema Editors Awards	Best Edited Two-Hour Movie for Non-Commercial Television	Eric A. Sears	Won	
1999	Art Directors Guild Awards	Excellence in Production Design Award – Television Movie or Mini-Series	David J. Bomba and John R. Jensen	Nominated	
1999	Costume Designers Guild Awards	Excellence in Costume Design for Television	Robert Turturice	Nominated	
1999	Directors Guild of America Awards	Outstanding Directorial Achievement in Movies for Television or Miniseries	Michael Cristofer	Won	
1999	GLAAD Media Awards	Outstanding TV Movie or TV Mini-Series		Nominated	
1999	Golden Globe Awards	Best Miniseries or Motion Picture Made for Television		Nominated	
1999	Golden Globe Awards	Best Actress in a Miniseries or Motion Picture Made for Television	Angelina Jolie	Won	
1999	Golden Globe Awards	Best Supporting Actress in a Series, Miniseries or Motion Picture Made for Television	Faye Dunaway	Won (Note: Tied with Camryn Manheim for The Practice.)	
1999	Satellite Awards	Best Miniseries or Motion Picture Made for Television		Nominated	
1999	Satellite Awards	Best Actress in a Miniseries or a Motion Picture Made for Television	Angelina Jolie	Won	
1999	Satellite Awards	Best Actress in a Supporting Role in a Miniseries or a Motion Picture Made for Television	Faye Dunaway	Nominated	
1999	Screen Actors Guild Awards	Outstanding Performance by a Female Actor in a Miniseries or Television Movie	Angelina Jolie	Won	
1999	Writers Guild of America Awards	Long Form – Original	Jay McInerney and Michael Cristofer	Nominated	
