= Mary of Teck =

Queen of the United Kingdom from 1910 to 1936

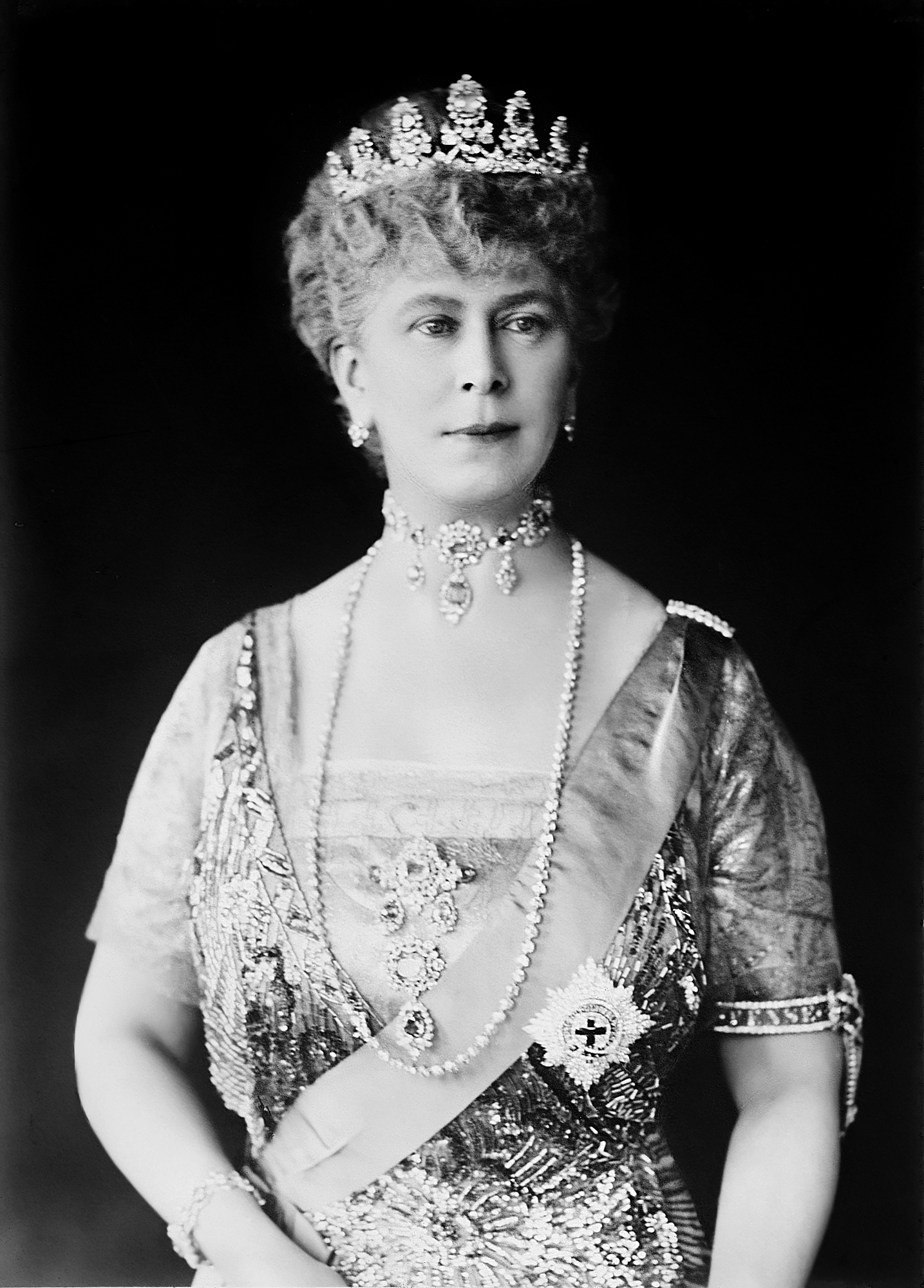
- Formal portrait, 1920s

Queen consort of the United Kingdom and the British Dominions; Empress consort of India
- Tenure: 6 May 1910 – 20 January 1936
- Coronation: 22 June 1911
- Imperial Durbar: 12 December 1911
- Born: Princess Victoria Mary of Teck; 26 May 1867; Kensington Palace, London, England
- Died: 24 March 1953 (aged 85); Marlborough House, London, England
- Burial: 31 March 1953; North Nave Aisle, St George's Chapel, Windsor Castle
- Spouse: George V (m. 1893; died 1936)
- Issue: Edward VIII; George VI; Mary, Princess Royal and Countess of Harewood; Prince Henry, Duke of Gloucester; Prince George, Duke of Kent; Prince John
Names
- Victoria Mary Augusta Louise Olga Pauline Claudine Agnes
- House: Teck
- Father: Francis, Duke of Teck
- Mother: Princess Mary Adelaide of Cambridge

Mary of Teck (Victoria Mary Augusta Louise Olga Pauline Claudine Agnes; 26 May 1867 – 24 March 1953) was Queen of the United Kingdom and the British Dominions, and Empress of India, from 6 May 1910 until 20 January 1936 as the wife of King George V.

Born in Kensington and raised in Belgravia, Mary was the daughter of Francis, Duke of Teck, an Austrian-born nobleman, and Princess Mary Adelaide of Cambridge, a granddaughter of King George III. She was informally known as "May", after the month of her birth. At the age of 24, she was betrothed to her second cousin once removed Prince Albert Victor, Duke of Clarence and Avondale, who was second in line to the throne. Six weeks after the announcement of the engagement, he died unexpectedly during a pandemic. The following year, she became engaged to Albert Victor's only surviving brother, George, who subsequently became king. Before her husband's accession, she was successively Duchess of York, Duchess of Cornwall, and Princess of Wales.

As queen consort from 1910, Mary supported her husband through the First World War, his ill health, and major political changes arising from the aftermath of the war. After George's death in 1936, she became queen mother when her eldest son, Edward VIII, ascended the throne. To her dismay, he abdicated later the same year in order to marry twice-divorced American socialite Wallis Simpson. She supported her second son, George VI, until his death in 1952. Mary died the following year, ten weeks before her granddaughter Elizabeth II was crowned. An ocean liner, a battlecruiser, and a university were named in her honour.

== Early life ==
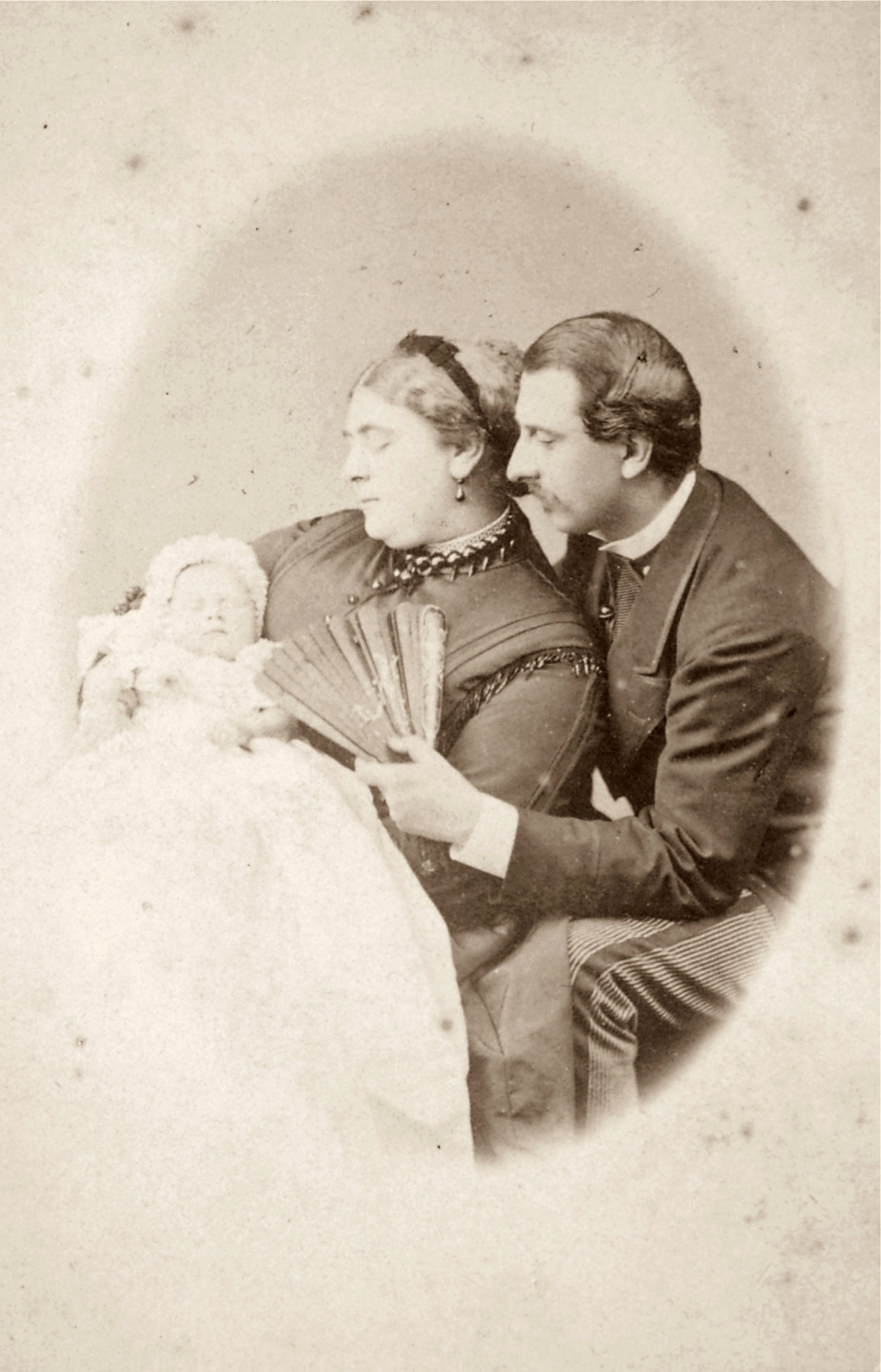
Mary as an infant with her parents

Mary was born on 26 May 1867 at Kensington Palace, London, in the room where Queen Victoria, her first cousin once removed, had been born 48 years and two days earlier. Queen Victoria came to visit the baby, writing that she was "a very fine one, with pretty little features and a quantity of hair".

Her father was Francis, Duke of Teck, the son of Duke Alexander of Württemberg by his morganatic wife, Countess Claudine Rhédey von Kis-Rhéde. Her mother was Princess Mary Adelaide of Cambridge, a granddaughter of King George III and the third child and younger daughter of Prince Adolphus, Duke of Cambridge, and Princess Augusta of Hesse-Kassel. Mary was baptised Victoria Mary Augusta Louise Olga Pauline Claudine Agnes in the Chapel Royal at Kensington Palace on 27 July by Charles Thomas Longley, Archbishop of Canterbury. (Note: Her three godparents were Queen Victoria, the Prince of Wales (later King Edward VII and May's future father-in-law), and her maternal grandmother, Princess Augusta, Duchess of Cambridge.) From an early age, she was known to her family, friends and the public by the diminutive name of "May", after her birth month.

May's upbringing was "merry but fairly strict". She was the eldest of four children and the only daughter. She "learned to exercise her native discretion, firmness, and tact" by resolving her three younger brothers' petty boyhood squabbles. They played with their cousins, the children of the Prince of Wales, who were similar in age. She grew up at Kensington Palace and White Lodge, in Richmond Park, which was granted by Queen Victoria on permanent loan. She was educated at home by her mother and governess (as were her brothers until they were sent to boarding schools). The Duchess of Teck spent an unusually long time with her children for a lady of her time and class, and enlisted May in various charitable endeavours, which included visiting the tenements of the poor. Mary's governess, Hélène Bricka, encouraged wide reading and intellectual discipline; Bricka remained a trusted adviser into adulthood and later assisted in the early education of Mary's children.

Although May was a great-grandchild of George III, she was only a minor member of the British royal family. Her father, the Duke of Teck, had no inheritance or wealth and carried the lower royal style of Serene Highness because his parents' marriage was morganatic. The Duchess of Teck was granted a parliamentary annuity of £5,000 and received about £4,000 a year from her mother, the Duchess of Cambridge, but she donated lavishly to dozens of charities. Prince Francis was deeply in debt and moved his family abroad with a small staff in 1883, in order to economise. They travelled throughout Europe, visiting their various relations. For a time they stayed in Florence, Italy, where May enjoyed visiting the art galleries, churches and museums. She was fluent in English, German, and French.

In 1885, the family returned to London and lived for some time in Chester Square. May was close to her mother and acted as an unofficial secretary, helping to organise parties and social events. She was also close to her aunt Augusta, Grand Duchess of Mecklenburg-Strelitz, and wrote to her every week. During the First World War, the Crown Princess of Sweden helped pass letters from May to Augusta, who lived in enemy territory in Germany until her death in 1916.

== Engagements ==
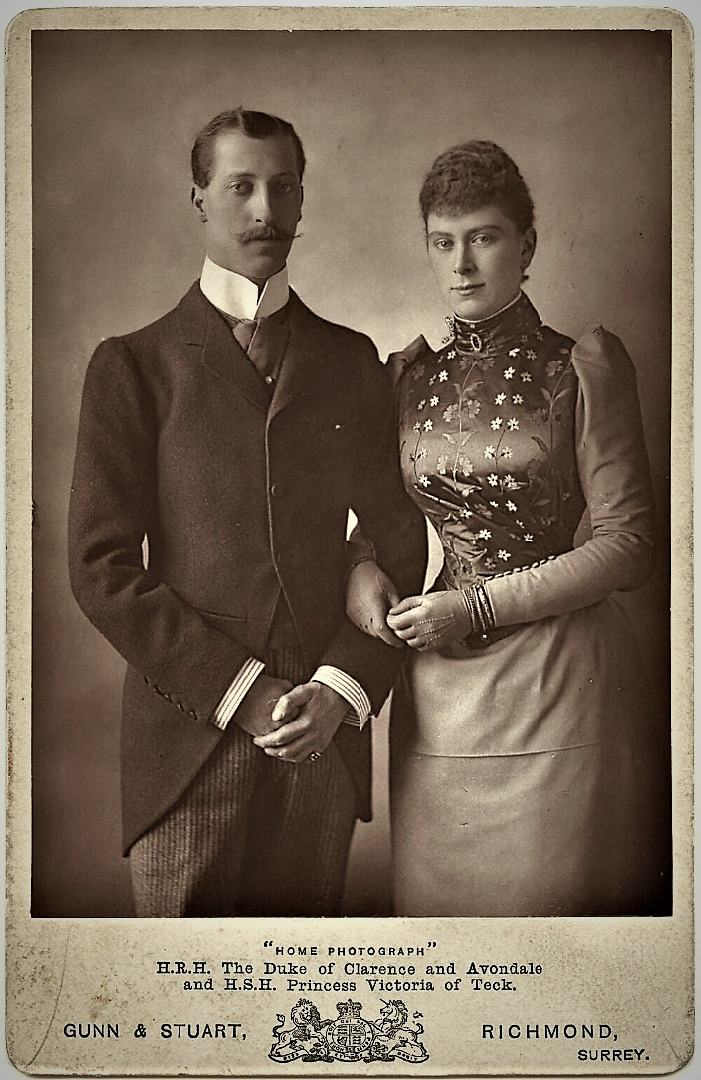
Victoria Mary ("May") with Prince Albert Victor, 1891

In 1886, May was a debutante in her first season and was introduced at court. Her status as the only unmarried British princess who was not descended from Queen Victoria made her a suitable candidate for the royal family's most eligible bachelor, Prince Albert Victor, Duke of Clarence and Avondale, her second cousin once removed and the eldest son of the Prince of Wales. (Note: May's maternal grandfather, Prince Adolphus, Duke of Cambridge, was a brother of Prince Edward Augustus, Duke of Kent, who was the father of Queen Victoria, Albert Victor's paternal grandmother.)

On 3 December 1891 at Luton Hoo, then the country residence of Danish Ambassador Christian Frederick de Falbe, Albert Victor proposed marriage to May and she accepted. The choice of May as bride for the Duke owed much to Queen Victoria's fondness for her, as well as to her strong character and sense of duty. However, Albert Victor died six weeks later, in a recurrence of the worldwide 1889–1890 pandemic.

Albert Victor's brother, Prince George, Duke of York, now second in line to the throne, evidently became close to May during their shared period of mourning, and Queen Victoria still thought of her as a suitable candidate to marry a future king. The public was also anxious that the Duke of York should marry and settle the succession. In May 1893, George proposed, and May accepted. They were soon deeply in love, and their marriage was a success. George wrote to May every day they were apart and, unlike his father, never took a mistress.

== Duchess of York ==
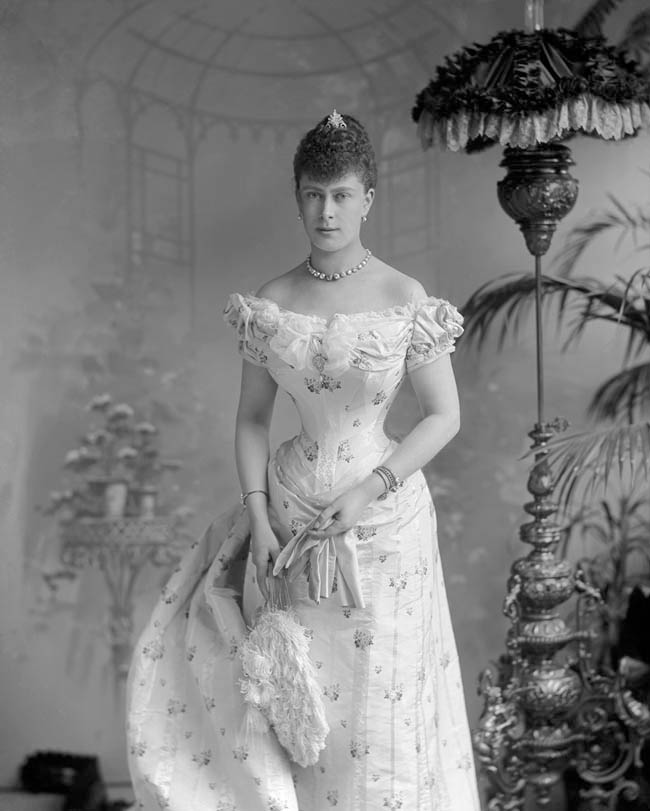
Princess Victoria Mary shortly before her marriage to the Duke of York in 1893

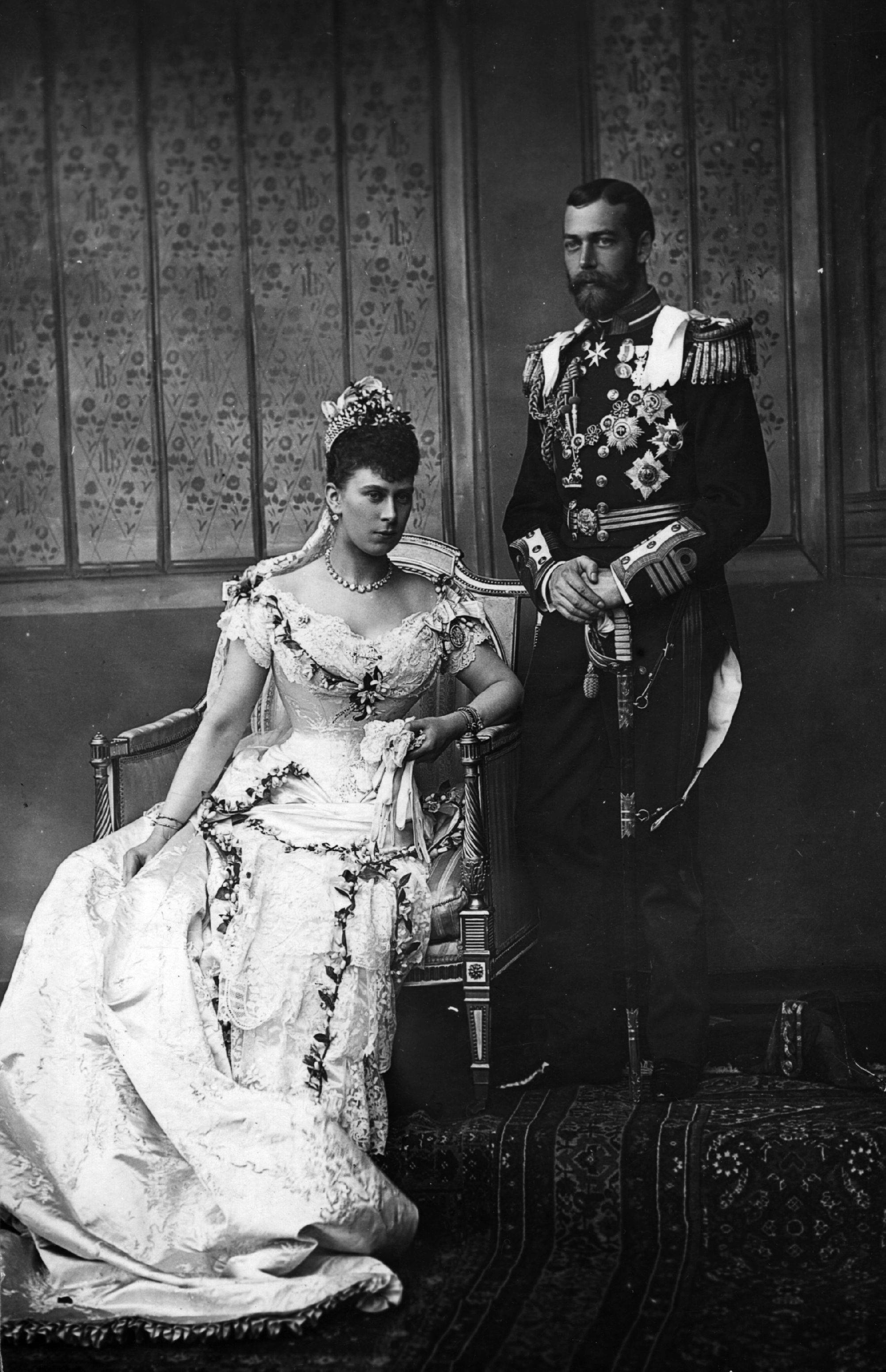
Wedding photo of Prince George, Duke of York, and Princess Victoria Mary of Teck, 6 July 1893

Mary married Prince George, Duke of York, in London on 6 July 1893 at the Chapel Royal, St James's Palace. The couple lived at York Cottage on the Sandringham Estate in Norfolk and in apartments at St James's Palace. York Cottage was a modest house for royalty, but it was a favourite of George, who liked a relatively simple life. They had six children: Edward, Albert, Mary, Henry, George, and John.

The children were put into the care of a nanny, as was usual in upper-class families at the time. The first nanny was dismissed for insolence and the second for abusing the children. This second woman, anxious to suggest that the children preferred her to anyone else, would pinch Edward and Albert whenever they were about to be presented to their parents so that they would start crying and be speedily returned to her. On discovery, she was replaced by her effective and much-loved assistant, Charlotte Bill.

Sometimes, Mary and George appear to have been distant parents. At first, they failed to notice the nanny's abuse of their sons Edward and Albert, and their youngest son, John, was housed in a private farm on the Sandringham Estate, in Charlotte Bill's care, perhaps to hide his epilepsy from the public. Despite Mary's austere public image and her strait-laced private life, she was a caring mother and comforted her children when they suffered from her husband's strict discipline.

Edward wrote fondly of his mother in his memoirs: "Her soft voice, her cultivated mind, the cosy room overflowing with personal treasures were all inseparable ingredients of the happiness associated with this last hour of a child's day ... Such was my mother's pride in her children that everything that happened to each one was of the utmost importance to her. With the birth of each new child, Mama started an album in which she painstakingly recorded each progressive stage of our childhood". He expressed a less charitable view, however, in private letters to his wife after his mother's death: "My sadness was mixed with incredulity that any mother could have been so hard and cruel towards her eldest son for so many years and yet so demanding at the end without relenting a scrap. I'm afraid the fluids in her veins have always been as icy cold as they are now in death."

Mary and George carried out a variety of public duties. In 1897, Mary became the patron of the London Needlework Guild in succession to her mother. The guild, initially established as The London Guild in 1882, was renamed several times and was named after Mary between 1914 and 2010. Samples of her own embroidery range from chair seats to tea cosies.

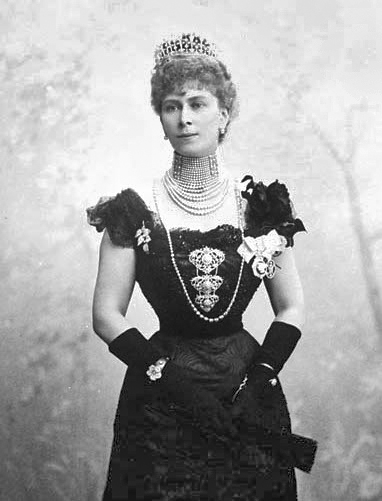
The Duchess of Cornwall and York in Ottawa, 1901

On 22 January 1901, Queen Victoria died, and Mary's father-in-law ascended the throne as Edward VII. For most of the rest of that year, George and Mary were known as the "Duke and Duchess of Cornwall and York". For eight months they toured the British Empire, visiting Gibraltar, Malta, Egypt, Ceylon, Singapore, Australia, New Zealand, Mauritius, South Africa and Canada. No royal had undertaken such an ambitious tour before. She broke down in tears at the thought of leaving her children, who were to be left in the care of their grandparents, for such a long time.

== Princess of Wales ==
On 9 November 1901, nine days after arriving back in Britain and on the King's 60th birthday, George was created Prince of Wales. The family moved their London residence from St James's Palace to Marlborough House. As Princess of Wales, Mary accompanied her husband on trips to Austria-Hungary and Württemberg in 1904. The following year, she gave birth to her last child, John. It was a difficult labour, and although she recovered quickly, her newborn son developed respiratory problems.

From October 1905 the Prince and Princess of Wales undertook another eight-month tour, this time of India, and the children were once again left in the care of their grandparents. They passed through Egypt both ways and on the way back stopped in Greece. The tour was almost immediately followed by a trip to Spain for the wedding of King Alfonso XIII to Victoria Eugenie of Battenberg, at which the bride and groom narrowly avoided assassination. (Note: The driver of their coach and over a dozen spectators were killed by a bomb thrown by an anarchist, Mateo Morral.) Only a week after returning to Britain, Mary and George went to Norway for the coronation of George's brother-in-law and sister, King Haakon VII and Queen Maud.

== Queen and empress consort ==
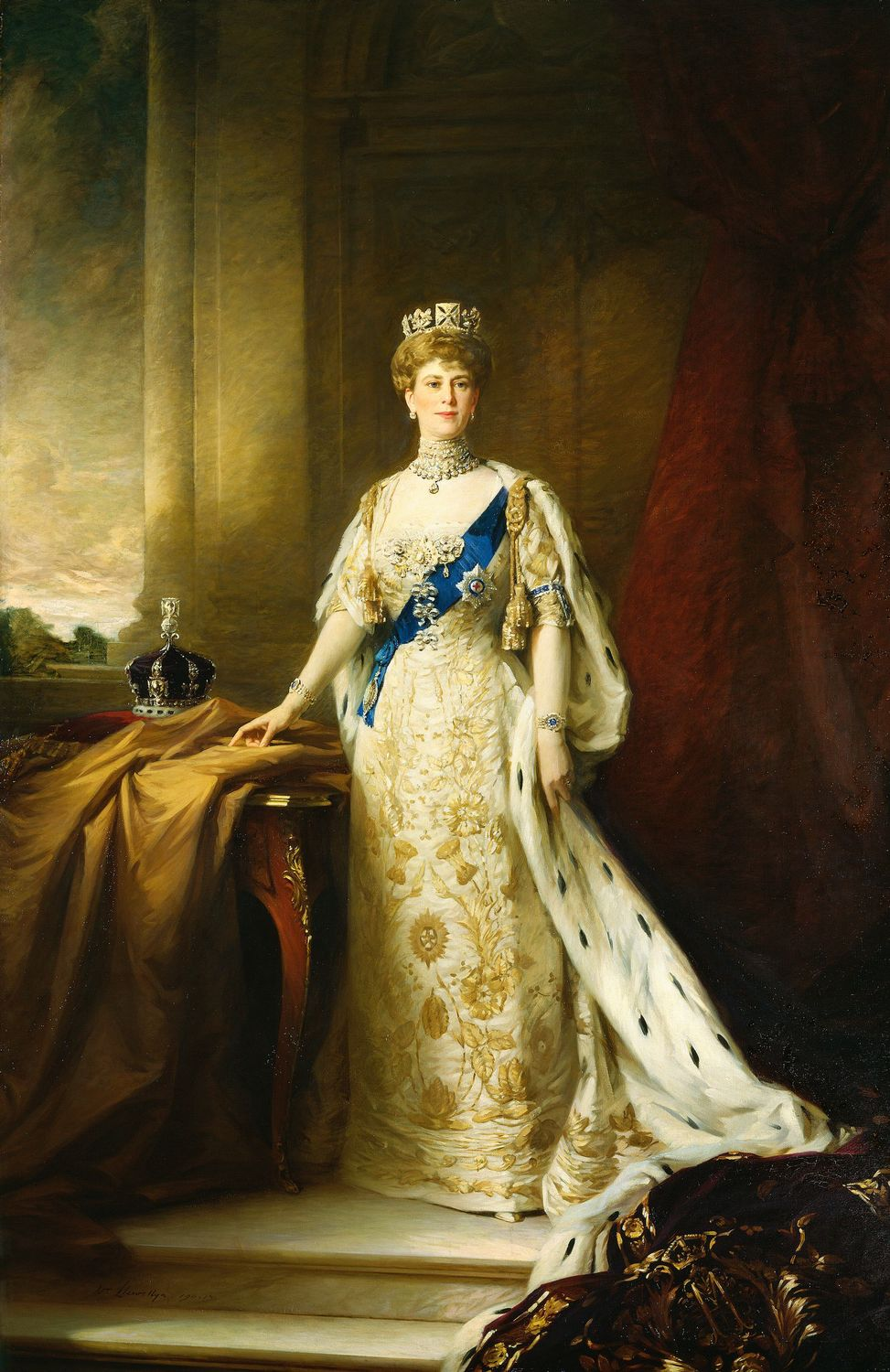
Portrait by William Llewellyn, c. 1911

On 6 May 1910, Edward VII died. Mary's husband ascended the throne and she became queen consort. When her husband asked her to drop one of her two official names, Victoria Mary, she chose to be called Mary, preferring not to be known by the same style as her husband's grandmother, Queen Victoria. She was the first British queen consort born in Britain since Catherine Parr assumed the title in July 1543. Mary was crowned alongside her husband at a coronation on 22 June 1911 in Westminster Abbey. Later in the year, the King and Queen travelled to India for the Delhi Durbar held on 12 December 1911, and toured the sub-continent as Emperor and Empress of India, returning to Britain in February.

The beginning of Mary's period as consort brought her into conflict with her mother-in-law, Queen Alexandra. Although the two were on friendly terms, Alexandra could be stubborn; she demanded precedence over Mary at the funeral of Edward VII, was slow in leaving Buckingham Palace, and kept some of the royal jewels that should have been passed to the new queen.

During the First World War, Queen Mary instituted an austerity drive at the palace, where she rationed food, and visited wounded and dying servicemen in hospital, which caused her great emotional strain. After three years of war against Germany, and with anti-German feeling in Britain running high, the Russian imperial family, which had been deposed by a revolutionary government, was refused asylum. News of the Tsar's abdication provided a boost to those in Britain who wished to replace their own monarchy with a republic. The war ended in 1918 with the defeat of Germany and the abdication and exile of the Kaiser, her husband's cousin.

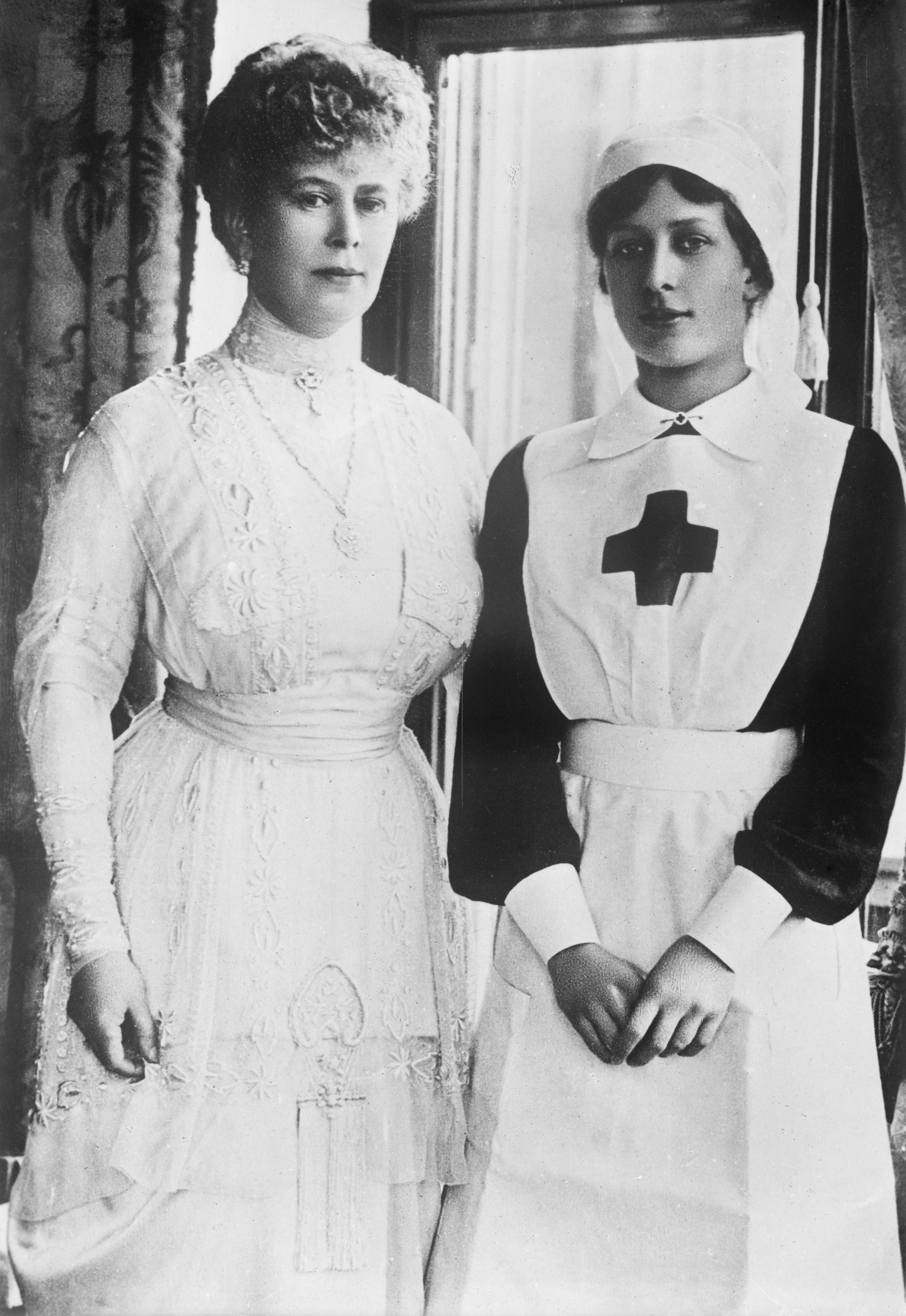
The Queen with her daughter Mary during the First World War

Two months after the end of the war, Prince John died at the age of thirteen. Queen Mary described her shock and sorrow in her diary and letters, extracts of which were published after her death: "our poor darling little Johnnie had passed away suddenly ... The first break in the family circle is hard to bear but people have been so kind & sympathetic & this has helped us [the King and me] much."

The Queen's staunch support of her husband continued during the later half of his reign. She advised him on speeches and used her extensive knowledge of history and royalty to advise him on matters affecting his position. He appreciated her discretion, intelligence, and judgement. She maintained an air of self-assured calm throughout all her public engagements in the years after the war, a period marked by civil unrest over social conditions, Irish independence, and Indian nationalism.

In the late 1920s, George became increasingly ill with lung problems, exacerbated by his heavy smoking. Mary paid particular attention to his care. During his illness in 1928, one of his doctors, Sir Farquhar Buzzard, was asked who had saved the King's life. He replied, "The Queen". In 1935, George and Mary celebrated their silver jubilee, with celebrations taking place throughout the British Empire. In his jubilee speech, George paid public tribute to his wife, having told his speechwriter, "Put that paragraph at the very end. I cannot trust myself to speak of the Queen when I think of all I owe her."

== Queen mother ==
George V died on 20 January 1936, after his physician, Lord Dawson of Penn, gave him an injection of morphine and cocaine that may have hastened his death. Mary's eldest son ascended the throne as Edward VIII. She was then to be known as Her Majesty Queen Mary.

Within the year, Edward's intention to marry his twice-divorced American mistress, Wallis Simpson, led to his abdication. Mary disapproved of divorce as it was contrary to the teaching of the Anglican Church, and thought Simpson wholly unsuitable to be the wife of a king. After receiving advice from British prime minister Stanley Baldwin, as well as the Dominion governments, that he could not remain king and marry Simpson, Edward abdicated.

Though loyal and supportive of her son, Mary could not comprehend why Edward would neglect his royal duties in favour of his personal feelings. Simpson had been presented formally to both King George V and Queen Mary at court, but Mary later refused to meet her either in public or privately. She saw it as her duty to provide moral support for her second son, the reserved Prince Albert, Duke of York. Albert ascended the throne on Edward's abdication, taking the name George VI. When Mary attended the coronation of George VI, she became the first British dowager queen to do so. (Note: According to custom, crowned heads did not attend coronations of other kings and queens.) While Edward's abdication did not lessen her love for him, she never wavered in her disapproval of his actions.

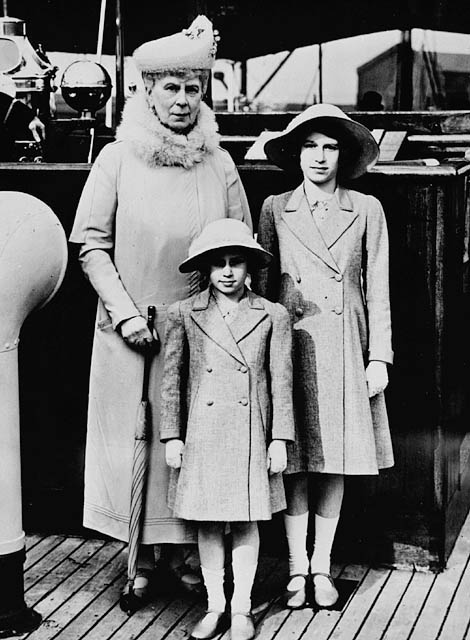
Queen Mary with her granddaughters, Princesses Margaret (front) and Elizabeth, May 1939

After her reign, Mary returned to live in her main London residence Marlborough House, where she had also lived as Princess of Wales. Mary took an interest in the upbringing of her granddaughters Elizabeth and Margaret. She took them on various excursions in London, to art galleries and museums. (The princesses' own parents thought it unnecessary for them to be burdened with a demanding educational regime.) In May 1939, Mary was in a car crash: her car was overturned but she escaped with minor injuries and bruises.

During the Second World War, George VI wished his mother to be evacuated from London. Although she was reluctant, she decided to live at Badminton House, Gloucestershire, with her niece Mary, Duchess of Beaufort, the daughter of her brother Adolphus. Her personal belongings were transported from London in seventy pieces of luggage. Her household, which comprised fifty-five servants, occupied most of the house, except for the Duke and Duchess's private suites, until after the war. The only people to complain about the arrangements were the royal servants, who found the house too small.

From Badminton, in support of the war effort, Queen Mary visited troops and factories and directed the gathering of scrap materials. She was known to offer lifts to soldiers she spotted on the roads. In 1942, her son George, Duke of Kent, was killed in an air crash while on active service. Mary finally returned to Marlborough House in June 1945, after the war in Europe had resulted in the defeat of Nazi Germany.

Mary was an eager collector of objects and pictures with a royal connection. She paid above-market estimates when purchasing jewels from the estate of Dowager Empress Marie of Russia and paid almost three times the estimate when buying the family's Cambridge Emeralds from Lady Kilmorey, the mistress of her late brother Prince Francis. After Francis's death, Mary had intervened to ensure his will was sealed by a court to cover his affair with Kilmorey. This set a precedent for royal wills to be sealed. In 1924, the famous architect Sir Edwin Lutyens created Queen Mary's Dolls' House for her collection of miniature pieces. She has sometimes been criticised for her aggressive acquisition of objets d'art for the Royal Collection. On several occasions, she would express to hosts, or others, that she admired something they had in their possession, in the expectation that the owner would be willing to donate it.

Mary's extensive knowledge of, and research into, the Royal Collection helped in identifying artefacts and artwork that had gone astray over the years. The royal family had lent out many pieces over previous generations. Once she had identified unreturned items through old inventories, she would write to the holders, requesting that they be returned. In addition to being an avid collector, Mary also commissioned many gifts of jewellery, including rings which she presented to her ladies-in-waiting on the occasion of their engagements.

== Final year and death ==
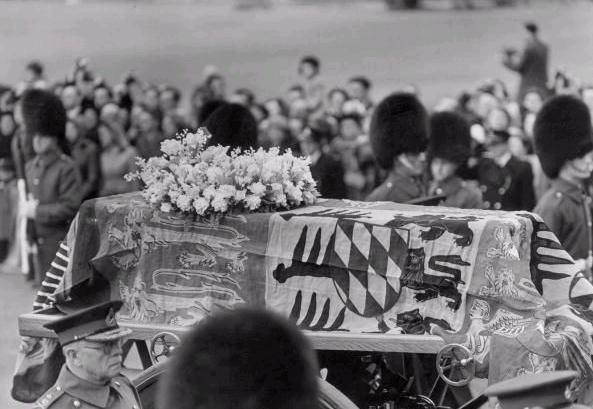
Queen Mary's funeral carriage. Her coffin was draped in her personal banner of arms.

In 1952, George VI died, the third of Mary's children to predecease her; her eldest granddaughter, Princess Elizabeth, ascended the throne as Queen Elizabeth II. The death of a third child profoundly affected her. Mary remarked to Princess Marie Louise: "I have lost three sons through death, but I have never been privileged to be there to say a last farewell to them."

On the accession of Elizabeth II, there was some dispute regarding the dynasty to which descendants of Elizabeth and her husband Philip would belong. Mary expressed to Prime Minister Winston Churchill her aversion to the idea of the House of Mountbatten succeeding the House of Windsor as the royal dynasty.

Mary died in her sleep at Marlborough House at 10.20 pm on 24 March 1953, aged 85, ten weeks before her granddaughter's coronation. She had let it be known that should she die, the coronation should not be postponed. Her remains lay in state at Westminster Hall, where large numbers of mourners filed past her coffin. She is buried beside her husband in the nave of St George's Chapel, Windsor Castle.

Mary's will was sealed in London after her death. Her estate was valued at £406,407 (or £13.7 million in 2024 when adjusted for inflation).

== Legacy ==
Actresses who have portrayed Queen Mary include Flora Robson (in A King's Story, 1965), Wendy Hiller (on the London stage in Crown Matrimonial, 1972), Greer Garson (in the television production of Crown Matrimonial, 1974), Judy Loe (in Edward the Seventh, 1975), Peggy Ashcroft (in Edward & Mrs. Simpson, 1978), Phyllis Calvert (in The Woman He Loved, 1988), Gaye Brown (in All the King's Men, 1999), Miranda Richardson (in The Lost Prince, 2003), Margaret Tyzack (in Wallis & Edward, 2005), Claire Bloom (in The King's Speech, 2010), Judy Parfitt (in W.E., 2011), Valerie Dane (in the television version of Downton Abbey, 2013), Eileen Atkins (in Bertie and Elizabeth, 2002 and The Crown, 2016), Geraldine James (in the film version of Downton Abbey, 2019), and Candida Benson (in The Crown, 2022).

Many places and buildings have been named in Mary's honour, including Queen Mary University of London, Queen Mary Reservoir in Surrey, and Queen Mary College in Lahore.

Sir Henry "Chips" Channon wrote that Queen Mary was "above politics ... magnificent, humorous, worldly, in fact nearly sublime, though cold and hard. But what a grand Queen."

== Titles, honours and arms ==
Queen Mary's arms were the royal coat of arms of the United Kingdom impaled with her family arms – the arms of her grandfather Prince Adolphus, Duke of Cambridge, in the 1st and 4th quarters, and the arms of her father, Prince Francis, Duke of Teck, in the 2nd and 3rd quarters. The shield is surmounted by the imperial crown, and supported by the crowned lion of England and "a stag Proper" as in the arms of Württemberg.

Coat of arms of Mary, Duchess of York

Coat of arms of Mary, Princess of Wales

Coat of arms of Queen Mary

Royal cypher of Queen Mary

== Issue ==
| Name | Birth | Death | Marriage | | Their children |
| Name | Birth | Death | Date | Spouse | Their children |
|---|---|---|---|---|---|
| Edward VIII (later Duke of Windsor) | 23 June 1894 | 28 May 1972 (aged 77) | 3 June 1937 | Wallis Simpson | None |
| George VI | 14 December 1895 | 6 February 1952 (aged 56) | 26 April 1923 | Lady Elizabeth Bowes-Lyon | Elizabeth II |
| George VI | 14 December 1895 | 6 February 1952 (aged 56) | 26 April 1923 | Lady Elizabeth Bowes-Lyon | Princess Margaret, Countess of Snowdon |
| Mary, Princess Royal | 25 April 1897 | 28 March 1965 (aged 67) | 28 February 1922 | Henry Lascelles, 6th Earl of Harewood | George Lascelles, 7th Earl of Harewood |
| Mary, Princess Royal | 25 April 1897 | 28 March 1965 (aged 67) | 28 February 1922 | Henry Lascelles, 6th Earl of Harewood | The Hon. Gerald Lascelles |
| Prince Henry, Duke of Gloucester | 31 March 1900 | 10 June 1974 (aged 74) | 6 November 1935 | Lady Alice Montagu Douglas Scott | Prince William of Gloucester |
| Prince Henry, Duke of Gloucester | 31 March 1900 | 10 June 1974 (aged 74) | 6 November 1935 | Lady Alice Montagu Douglas Scott | Prince Richard, Duke of Gloucester |
| Prince George, Duke of Kent | 20 December 1902 | 25 August 1942 (aged 39) | 29 November 1934 | Princess Marina of Greece and Denmark | Prince Edward, Duke of Kent |
| Prince George, Duke of Kent | 20 December 1902 | 25 August 1942 (aged 39) | 29 November 1934 | Princess Marina of Greece and Denmark | Princess Alexandra, The Honourable Lady Ogilvy |
| Prince George, Duke of Kent | 20 December 1902 | 25 August 1942 (aged 39) | 29 November 1934 | Princess Marina of Greece and Denmark | Prince Michael of Kent |
| Prince John | 12 July 1905 | 18 January 1919 (aged 13) | None | | None |

== Ancestry ==
Ancestors of Mary of Teck

8. Duke Louis of Württemberg
4. Duke Alexander of Württemberg
9. Princess Henriette of Nassau-Weilburg
2. Francis, Duke of Teck
10. Count László Rhédey de Kis-Rhéde
5. Countess Claudine Rhédey de Kis-Rhéde
11. Baroness Ágnes Inczédy de Nagy-Várad
1. Princess Victoria Mary of Teck
12. George III of the United Kingdom
6. Prince Adolphus, Duke of Cambridge
13. Duchess Charlotte of Mecklenburg-Strelitz
3. Princess Mary Adelaide of Cambridge
14. Prince Frederick of Hesse-Kassel
7. Princess Augusta of Hesse-Kassel
15. Princess Caroline of Nassau-Usingen

== See also ==
- Crown of Queen Mary
- Household of George V and Mary
- List of covers of Time magazine (1920s), (1930s)

== Notes ==
Mary of Teck House of Teck Born: 26 May 1867 Died: 24 March 1953
Royal titles
| Preceded by Alexandra of Denmark | Queen consort of the United Kingdom and the British Dominions; Empress consort of India; 1910–1936 | Vacant Title next held by Elizabeth Bowes-Lyon |
Honorary titles
| Preceded by The Prince of Wales | Grand Master of the Order of the British Empire; 1936–1953 | Succeeded by The Duke of Edinburgh |
