= Joanna Beresford =

British television producer

Joanna Beresford (4 December 1956 - June 2025) was a British television producer and Director of Production for Avalon. She won a Primetime Emmy Award for Outstanding Miniseries for The Lost Prince in 2005 and an International Emmy Kids Award for Animation for The Amazing World of Gumball in 2013. She also won British Academy Children's Awards for Best Animation for The Amazing World of Gumball in 2011 and 2012.
