= The Lost Prince =

2003 television film

- The Lost Prince DVD Cover
- Created by: Stephen Poliakoff
- Written by: Stephen Poliakoff
- Starring: Matthew James Thomas; Miranda Richardson; Tom Hollander; Bill Nighy
- Country of origin: United Kingdom
- Original language: English
- No. of episodes: 2

Production
- Producers: Joanna Beresford; John Chapman; Rebecca Eaton; Peter Fincham; David M. Thompson
- Cinematography: Barry Ackroyd
- Editor: Clare Douglas
- Production companies: BBC; TalkBack Productions; WGBH

Original release
- Network: BBC One
- Release: 19 January – 26 January 2003

The Lost Prince is a 2003 British television drama about the life of Prince John – youngest child of Britain's King George V and Queen Mary – who died at the age of 13 in 1919. John had epileptic seizures and an autism-like developmental disorder, and the Royal Family tried to shelter him from public view; the script did not present the Royal Family as unsympathetic, instead showing how much this cost them emotionally (particularly John's mother, Queen Mary). Poliakoff explores the story of John, his relationship with his family and brother Prince George, the political events going on at the time (such as the fall of the House of Romanov in 1917) and the love and devotion of his nanny, Charlotte Bill (Lalla).

A Talkback Thames production written and directed by Stephen Poliakoff, it was originally broadcast in January 2003. It won three Emmy Awards in 2005.

== Plot summary ==
Episode One

In December 1908, young Prince John watches his family attend a birthday party for his grandmother Queen Alexandra, at Sandringham in Norfolk.

Next summer, Tsar Nicholas II, Tsarina Alexandra and their children visit their relations, the British royals, on the Isle of Wight. The Russians entrance Prince John with their exoticism. It is clear that Johnnie, a charming boy, has an eccentric view of the world and is uninhibited in a way that is alien to his parents. His grandfather, King Edward VII, loves him for his frankness. His nanny, Lalla, is reluctant to reveal the seriousness of his medical condition.

While people gaze into the skies to catch a glimpse of the approaching Halley's Comet, Johnnie's parents go to Buckingham Palace to be at the King's deathbed.

During the funeral Johnnie has an epileptic seizure. Queen Mary, Johnnie's mother, summons doctors to examine him; their diagnosis confirms the worst fears. Lalla volunteers to look after Johnnie, to prevent him being sent to an institution. They go to Sandringham, where Johnnie can be prevented from encountering anybody but the closest members of his family.

His brother, Prince George swears to protect him. Johnnie, now a few years older, is deprived of the company of other children and finds his lessons unfathomable, though he always takes an optimistic view of life. Then one day he embarrasses his parents by speaking his mind at a tea party held for Prime Minister H. H. Asquith and the Chancellor of the Exchequer, Lloyd George.

Johnnie is brought to London to be re-examined. During his stay he is taken by George up to the gallery looking down on the banqueting hall of Buckingham Palace, at a grand state occasion. The dignitaries are chattering about the poise with which the Queen has dealt with the intrusion of a suffragette, who confronted the Queen to demand support for women's suffrage. During the banquet Asquith and Lloyd George are called back to Downing Street to receive the news that is to prove to be the catalyst for the start of World War I.

The following morning Johnnie has a rare meeting with his father King George V, who shows him his treasured stamp collection. Johnnie is more interested in his father's pet parrot, Charlotte. They are interrupted by the King's Private Secretary, Lord Stamfordham, who relays news of the assassination of Archduke Franz Ferdinand. Realising this has been withheld from him, the King is furious. Unnoticed by the adults, Johnnie pursues Charlotte, as the terrified bird flies away into the building. The Queen, Lalla and George go searching for Johnnie and his mother is shocked when she sees one of Johnnie's fits for the first time. As officials gather for diplomatic meetings, Johnnie is taken back to the isolation of Sandringham.

Episode Two

Prince George witnesses the brinkmanship between the Allies and the Central Powers, led by Germany. Surprisingly, the vacillating Tsar Nicholas of Russia mobilises his troops and plunges Europe into war. Against his wishes, Prince George is sent to the Naval College where his rebellious nature leads him to question propaganda about the cruelty of the German armed forces.

Such propaganda, combined with the disastrous conflict on the battlefields of Flanders and France, turns the public's attention to the German ancestry of the British royal family. The trauma of war is even felt by Johnnie, Lalla and their household, who are forced to live in increased isolation in Wood Farm, on the fringes of the Sandringham estate. Prince George, determined to maintain contact with Lalla and his brother, arrives to relay the news that the family is to change its name to Windsor, and also that the Tsar of Russia has abdicated and is to be exiled to Britain by the Bolshevik revolutionaries.

George V is alarmed at the reaction of his subjects to this and gets Stamfordham to press Lloyd George, who is now Prime Minister, to rescind the invitation to the Tsar. Johnnie dreams innocently of his Russian cousins coming to live with him. King George and Queen Mary are traumatised by what follows – the execution of the Romanovs. Weighed down, they find consolation when Johnnie dies, in his unbounded optimism and unalloyed love of life.

== Cast ==
- Daniel Williams – Prince "Johnnie" John (younger)
- Matthew Thomas – Prince John (older)
- Brock Everitt-Elwick – Prince George (younger)
- Rollo Weeks – Prince George (older)
- Samuel Page – Tsarevich Alexei (younger)
- Kostya Severov – Tsarevich Alexei (older)
- Miranda Richardson – Queen Mary
- Mary Nighy – Princess Mary
- Gina McKee – Lalla
- Tom Hollander – King George V
- Bill Nighy – Arthur Bigge, 1st Baron Stamfordham
- Bibi Andersson – Queen Alexandra
- Ron Cook – David Lloyd George
- Roz McCutcheon – Princess Mary Adelaide
- Frank Finlay – H. H. Asquith
- John Sessions – Henry Hansell
- Michael Gambon – King Edward VII
- David Barrass – Kaiser Wilhelm II
- Ivan Marevich – Tsar Nicholas II
- Ingeborga Dapkūnaitė – Tsarina Alexandra Feodorovna
- Vanessa Ackerman – Grand Duchess Olga
- Holly Boyd – Grand Duchess Tatiana
- Nastya Razduhova – Grand Duchess Maria
- Algina Lipskis – Grand Duchess Anastasia

== Reception ==
The drama achieved a high viewing figure, was released on VHS and DVD, and was repeated on BBC One in January 2004.

== Accolades ==
| Year | Award | Category | Nominee(s) | Result | Ref. |
|---|---|---|---|---|---|
| 2003 | Royal Television Society Craft & Design Awards | Costume Design – Drama | Odile Dicks-Mireaux | Won | |
| 2003 | Royal Television Society Craft & Design Awards | Team Award | Craft & Design Team | Nominated | |
| 2004 | British Academy Television Awards | Best Actress | Gina McKee | Nominated | |
| 2004 | British Academy Television Awards | Best Actress | Miranda Richardson | Nominated | |
| 2004 | British Academy Television Craft Awards | Best Editing – Fiction/Entertainment | Clare Douglas | Nominated | |
| 2004 | British Academy Television Craft Awards | Best Make Up and Hair Design | Liz Tagg | Nominated | |
| 2004 | British Academy Television Craft Awards | Best Original Television Music | Adrian Johnston | Nominated | |
| 2004 | British Academy Television Craft Awards | Best Photography and Lighting – Fiction | Barry Ackroyd | Nominated | |
| 2004 | British Academy Television Craft Awards | Best Production Design | John-Paul Kelly | Won | |
| 2004 | Broadcasting Press Guild Awards | Best Single Drama | | Won | |
| 2004 | Directors Guild of Great Britain Awards | Outstanding Directorial Achievement in Television Movie/Serial | Stephen Poliakoff | Nominated | |
| 2004 | Online Film & Television Association Awards | Best Miniseries | | Nominated | |
| 2004 | Online Film & Television Association Awards | Best Actress in a Motion Picture or Miniseries | Miranda Richardson | Nominated | |
| 2004 | Online Film & Television Association Awards | Best Supporting Actor in a Motion Picture or Miniseries | Bill Nighy | Nominated | |
| 2004 | Online Film & Television Association Awards | Best Direction of a Motion Picture or Miniseries | Stephen Poliakoff | Nominated | |
| 2004 | Online Film & Television Association Awards | Best Writing of a Motion Picture or Miniseries | Stephen Poliakoff | Nominated | |
| 2004 | Online Film & Television Association Awards | Best Ensemble in a Motion Picture or Miniseries | | Nominated | |
| 2004 | Online Film & Television Association Awards | Best Costume Design in a Motion Picture or Miniseries | | Nominated | |
| 2004 | Royal Television Society Awards | Drama Serial | | Nominated | |
| 2005 | Golden Globe Awards | Best Actress – Miniseries or Television Film | Miranda Richardson | Nominated | |
| 2005 | Primetime Emmy Awards | Outstanding Miniseries | Peter Fincham, David M. Thompson, Rebecca Eaton, Joanna Beresford, and John Chapman | Won | |
| 2005 | Primetime Emmy Awards | Outstanding Art Direction for a Miniseries or Movie | John Paul Kelly, Emma MacDevitt, and Sara Wan | Won (Note: Tied with Sarah Knowles, Scott Ritenour, Thomas Minton, and Frank Galline for Warm Springs.) | |
| 2005 | Primetime Emmy Awards | Outstanding Costumes for a Miniseries, Movie or a Special | Odile Dicks-Mireaux and Colin May (for "Part 1") | Won | |
| 2005 | Satellite Awards | Best Miniseries | | Won | |
| 2005 | Satellite Awards | Best Actress in a Miniseries or Motion Picture Made for Television | Miranda Richardson | Nominated | |
| 2005 | Satellite Awards | Best Actor in a Supporting Role in a Series, Miniseries or Motion Picture Made for Television | Bill Nighy | Won | |
| 2005 | Satellite Awards | Best Actress in a Supporting Role in a Series, Miniseries or Motion Picture Made for Television | Gina McKee | Nominated | |
| 2005 | Young Artist Awards | Best Performance in a TV Movie, Miniseries or Special – Supporting Young Actor | Brock Everitt-Elwick | Nominated | |
| 2005 | Young Artist Awards | Best Performance in a TV Movie, Miniseries or Special – Supporting Young Actor | Daniel Williams | Nominated | |
