= Charlotte Bill =

Nanny to the children of King George V and Queen Mary

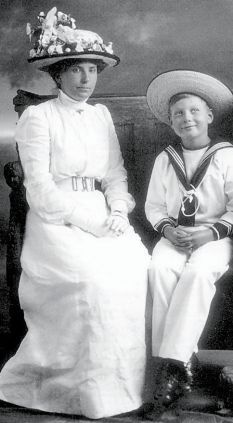
- Charlotte Bill with Prince John
- Born: Charlotte Jane Bill; 9 December 1875
- Died: 13 December 1964 (aged 89); Maidenhead, Berkshire
- Occupation: Nanny

Charlotte Jane "Lala" Bill (9 December 1875 – 13 December 1964) was an English nanny to the children of the Duke and Duchess of York, later King George V and Queen Mary. She was most closely involved with the couple's youngest child, Prince John, whom she nursed devotedly from 1905 until his death in 1919.

== Employment ==
Bill began her employment as the under-nurse to the York children. Working under the head nurse, she was shocked at the nurse's treatment of the royal children. The nurse appeared to resent every new addition to the nursery and neglected the second son, Bertie, later George VI, to the point that he became ill. The head nurse had originally been a nursemaid to the Duke and Duchess of Newcastle and had received a good reference from them. After Bill expressed her concerns about the head nurse, she was dismissed in 1897, and Bill was appointed in her place.

As the children grew up, she became especially close to the youngest child, John, who had epilepsy and learning difficulties. Although John originally stayed at York Cottage with his mother and father, he was separated from them and moved with Bill to nearby Wood Farm on the Sandringham Estate. Bill nursed John until his death from a severe epileptic seizure on 18 January 1919. It was Bill who telephoned Queen Mary to inform her of his death, and she and the King travelled from Buckingham Palace to Wood Farm to see their dead son. Bill attended his burial at Sandringham Church, where he was interred next to his uncle Prince Alexander John of Wales, the infant son of King Edward VII and Queen Alexandra, John's grandparents.

== Life after Johnnie ==
She remained devoted to the memory of the young prince right up to her death on 13 December 1964, at the age of 89. She died at a hospital in Maidenhead, Berkshire. On one visit to her house, John's brother, the Duke of Windsor noticed that the first object he saw when he walked into Bill's house was a large photo of Johnnie as a toddler on her fireplace mantel.

== Legacy ==
Her character appears in the film The Lost Prince, where she is played by Gina McKee.

A novel called The Royal Nanny by Karen Harper is based on the story of Bill and her time with the royal children.

== Sources ==
- Reynolds, K. D., 'John, Prince (1905–1919)', Oxford Dictionary of National Biography, Oxford University Press, 2004 accessed 3 Feb 2008
- Van Der Kiste, John, George V's Children (Sutton Publishing, 2001) ISBN 0-86299-816-6
