= Wilhelmina Cooper =

American model and modeling agent (1939–1980)

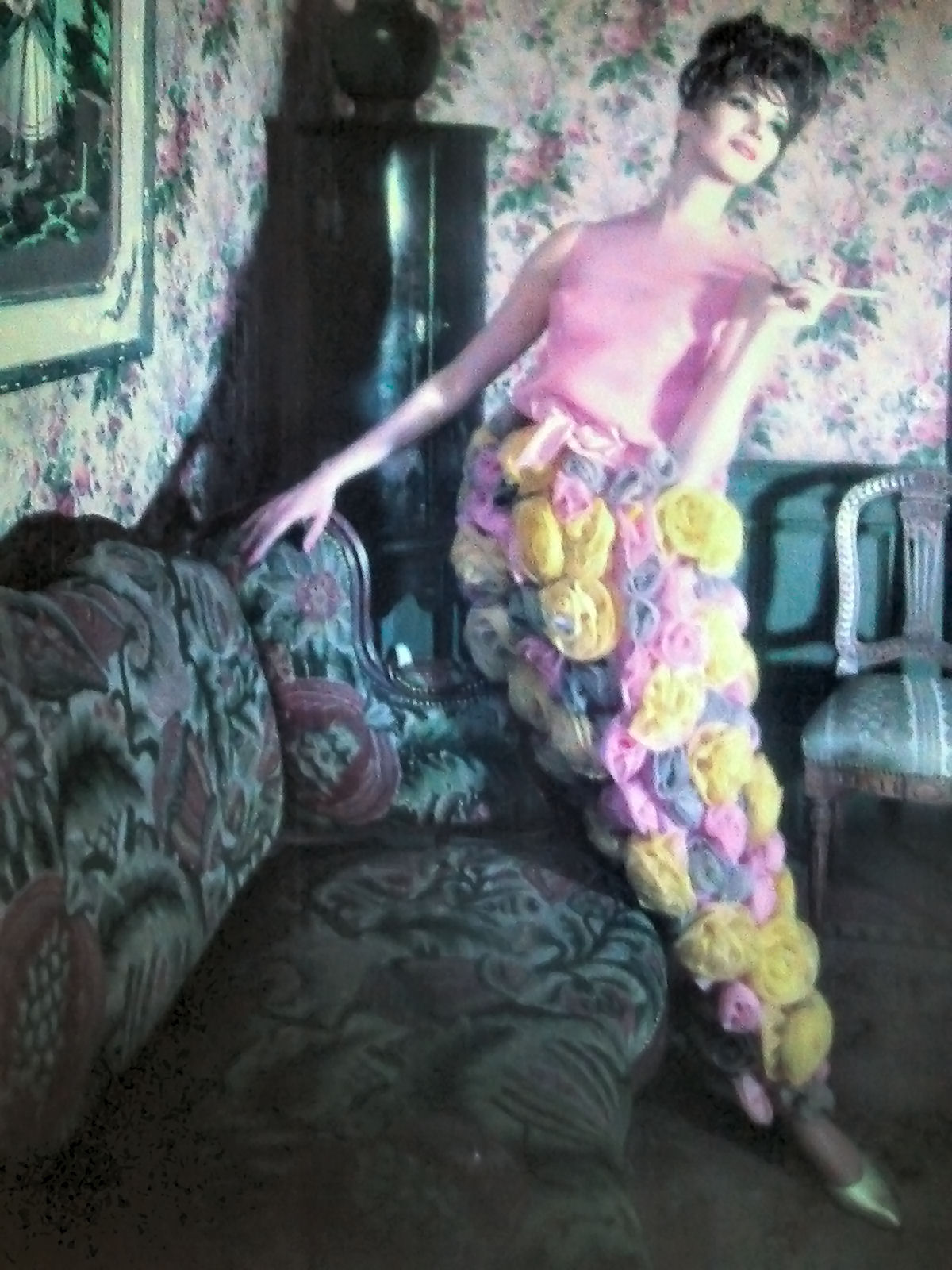
- Cooper photographed by Edgar de Evia circa 1960s
- Born: Wilhelmina Gertrud Frieda Behmenburg; 11 May 1939; Culemborg, Gelderland, Netherlands
- Died: 1 March 1980 (aged 40); Greenwich, Connecticut, U.S.
- Other name: Winnie Hart
- Spouse: Bruce Cooper (m. 1965)
- Children: 2
- Modeling information
- Height: 5 ft 11 in (1.80 m)
- Hair color: Dark brown
- Eye color: Brown

Wilhelmina Gertrud Frieda Cooper (née Behmenburg; 11 May 1939 – 1 March 1980) was an American model who began with Ford Models, and at the peak of her success, founded her own agency, Wilhelmina Models, in New York City in 1967.

== Biography ==
Wilhelmina Gertrud Frieda Behmenburg was born on 11 May 1939 in Culemborg, the daughter of Wilhelm Robert Karl Behmenburg (1901–1977), who was a German butcher, and Klasina van der Straten (1909–1992). Some sources list her name as being Gertrude Wilhelmina Behmenburg or Willy Gertruida Frieda Behmenburg.

She had a younger brother, Walter Günther Behmenburg (1941–1945), who died at three years old after being hit by a car. The family moved to Utrecht in 1942, where they lived until 1944. After World War II, they moved to Oldenburg, Germany.

The family immigrated to Chicago in 1954. There, she became obsessed with fashion magazines, later saying,

I even went to second-hand stores to buy all the old issues … I read them cover to cover, devouring every word and every picture of my new idols, the beautiful models who reached so glamorously from the pages out to me.

In 1956, she borrowed money from her father to go to modeling school. She took on the stage name Winnie Hart, and in 1958, she graduated from high school and joined the Models Bureau.

Patricia Stevens, a booker at another agency, approached Wilhelmina at the 1959 International Trade Show in Chicago and instructed her to lose 20 pounds if she wanted to become a successful model, as well as get rid of the stage name Winnie Hart. After losing the weight, she traveled to New York, where Eileen Ford of the Ford Modeling Agency told her that she needed to lose 20 more pounds and then she could go to Paris.

In Paris a colleague introduced Wilhelmina to diet pills. She reflected,

I was on continuous diets. I’m not fat as far as real life is concerned, but I certainly was when it came to modeling. I ate twice a week. In between, it was cigarettes and black coffee. On Wednesday, I had a little bowl of soup so I wouldn’t get too sick, or a little piece of cheese on a cracker. On Sunday, I’d have a small filet mignon without salt or any sauce. I was running on nervous energy as well as determination.

She spent a year in Paris and was featured on the cover of the December 1960 issue of L'Officiel before returning to the U.S. and becoming one of the most famous models of the 1960s. During her career, she appeared on the cover of 255 magazines, and also modeled in South America, India, Hong Kong, and Europe. In France, she worked for both Coco Chanel and Christian Dior. She also holds the record for most covers on American Vogue, appearing 27 or 28 times. At the height of her career, Wilhelmina made $100,000 a year.

In 1964, in a series called Private Lives of High Fashion Models, the New York Journal American said that Wilhelmina was a top model out of the 405 other models who were under contract at New York's top five agencies. Her career was also discussed in a Chicago Sun-Times article called Wilhelmina: From Waller High To Haute Couture.

According to her obituary in Time:

During her cover-girl days, Wilhelmina boasted that she was "one of the few high-fashion models built like a woman." And she was. With her 5 ft. 11 in., 38-24-36 frame, doe eyes, delicate cheekbones, and mane of high-piled dark hair, she epitomized the classical, aristocratic look that she helped to make the style standard of the 1950s and '60s...

On 5 February 1965, she married Victor Bruce Cooper, former executive producer of The Tonight Show Starring Johnny Carson. They had two children together; Melissa Wilhelmina Cooper and Jason S. Cooper.

In 1967, they founded Wilhelmina Models, which became the other leading model agency alongside Ford Models, years before Elite Model Management and other agencies began.

== Death ==
On 1 March 1980, Cooper died of lung cancer at the age of 40 in Greenwich Hospital, Greenwich, Connecticut.

== In popular culture ==
Cooper was portrayed by Faye Dunaway in the 1998 movie Gia, which tells the story of Gia Carangi, a model who was discovered by Cooper and later died of AIDS.
