= Linda Haas =

American sociologist

- Born: December 18, 1950 (age 75)
- Education: University of Wisconsin–Madison
- Scientific career
- Fields: Sociology
- Workplaces: Indiana University–Purdue University Indianapolis

Linda L. Haas (born December 18, 1950) is an American sociologist. She is professor emerita of sociology at the Indiana University-Purdue University Indianapolis.

== Life ==
Haas holds a B.A. from Indiana University as well as an M.A. (1973) and a Ph.D. (1977) in sociology from the University of Wisconsin–Madison, and has received an honorary doctorate in social sciences from the University of Gothenburg in Sweden.

Haas joined the faculty of Indiana University-Purdue University Indianapolis in the fall of 1977. She retired in 2014. She was an adjunct professor of Women's Studies at the same university. Her research focuses on gender, family policy, and families and work in post-industrialized societies, with a focus on Sweden.

Haas began researching gender bias in 1983. In 1988, she conducted research on Cinderella syndrome. She also assisted in the development of family leave policies in Australia and Sweden.

Haas received the Indiana University President's Award for Excellence in 1992 and the Teaching and the Bynum Award for Excellence in Mentoring.

== Selected books ==
- Equal Parenthood and Social Policy: A Study of Parental Leave in Sweden (SUNY Press, 1992)
- Organizational Change and Gender Equity: International Perspectives on Fathers and Mothers at the Workplace (edited with P. Hwang and G. Russell, Sage, 2000)
- Families and Social Policy: National and International Perspectives (edited with S. Wisensale, Haworth, 2006).
