= List of The Bionic Woman episodes =

This is a list of episodes of the American science-fiction series The Bionic Woman. The series was aired from 1976 to 1978 in three seasons with three television movies produced from 1987 to 1994. The series was a spin-off from The Six Million Dollar Man, where the character of Jaime Sommers (The Bionic Woman) had been introduced in the stories: The Bionic Woman (1975) and The Return of the Bionic Woman (1975).

== Series overview ==
Season	Episodes	Originally released		
Season	Episodes	First released	Last released	Network
1	14	January 14, 1976	May 26, 1976	ABC
2	22	September 22, 1976	May 4, 1977	ABC
3	22	September 10, 1977	May 13, 1978	NBC
TV movies		May 17, 1987	November 29, 1994	NBC

== Episodes ==
=== Season 1 (1976) ===
- Regular cast: Lindsay Wagner (Jaime Sommers), Richard Anderson (Oscar Goldman)
- Producer: Kenneth Johnson

No. overall	No. in season	Title	Directed by	Written by	Original release date
1	1	"Welcome Home, Jaime: Part 1"^{1}	Alan Crosland Jr.	Kenneth Johnson	January 14, 1976
Coming to terms with her memory loss, Jaime decides to move to Ojai to live with Steve's parents, and settle down. She takes an apartment at their ranch, and secures a job as a DoDEA schoolteacher on the nearby Air Force base. She establishes her authority over her unruly pupils by tearing a thick telephone directory in two. During a car accident, she uses her bionic abilities to get her out of trouble, but someone is watching. Cast: Martin E. Brooks (Dr. Rudy Wells), Martha Scott (Helen Elgin), Ford Rainey (Jim Elgin), Lee Majors (Col. Steve Austin), Dennis Patrick (Carlton Harris), Richard Lenz (Dr. Michael Marchetti), Roger Davis (Lt. Col. Tom Hollaway), Dee Timberlake (Karen Stone), Joe Rainer (Attendant), Christian Juttner (Teddy)
2	2	"Welcome Home, Jaime: Part 2"	Alan Crosland Jr.	Kenneth Johnson	January 21, 1976
Multi-millionaire Carlton Harris is keen to buy Jaime's services for his illegal purposes. Jaime agrees to meet him undercover in alliance with Oscar Goldman and the OSI. Jaime carries out a number of thefts of important scientific components, but Carlton is already making a deal to sell Jaime. However, she manages to catch Carlton and locks him and his buyers up until Oscar can arrest them. Cast: Martha Scott (Helen Elgin), Ford Rainey (Jim Elgin), Kip Niven (Donald Harris), Dennis Patrick (Carlton Harris), Gordon Jump (Charles Butler), Christian Juttner (Teddy), Bob Bralver (Sayers), Nick Pellegrino (Bailey), Alycia Gardner (Gwen), Kraig Metzinger (Joey)
3	3	"Angel of Mercy"	Alan J. Levi	James D. Parriott	January 28, 1976
Oscar sends Jaime to war-torn Costa Bravo to try to find the trapped American ambassador. To help her, he also sends pilot Jack Starkey. They make their dangerous journey through the desert, helped by a local boy. Eventually, they find the ambassador and manage to escape in an abandoned airplane. Cast: Andy Griffith (Jack Starkey), Claudio Martinez (Julio), James Karen (George Morehouse), Jean Allison (Judith Morehouse), Bert Santos (Castro Beard), Robbie Rist (Andrew), Paul Berrones (Wounded Soldier), Alycia Gardner (Gwen), Robbie Wolcott (Mark)
4	4	"A Thing of the Past"	Alan Crosland Jr.	Story by : Terence McDonnell & Jim Carlson; Teleplay by : Philip DeGuere, Jr.	February 18, 1976
While on a school trip, Jaime and her pupils are involved in a car accident. Their bus driver helps Jamie and the children escape, and he is declared a hero. This dredges up his past as years earlier he witnessed a high-profile murder. The two criminals are now out to get him. Jaime helps him, and with the help of Oscar, they manage to capture the murderers and bring them to justice. Cast: Lee Majors (Col. Steve Austin), Ford Rainey (Jim Elgin), Donald O'Connor (Harry Anderson), Don Gordon (Glen Morgan), Roger Perry (Mr. Stone), W.T. Zacha (Raines), Robbie Wolcott (Mark), Alycia Gardner (Gwen), Christian Juttner (Teddy), Lori Busk (Caroline), Brian Cutler (Major Don Mills), Mark Atkinson (Guard)
5	5	"Claws"	Phil Bondeli	Sue Milburn	February 25, 1976
Jaime is looking after an animal ranch for a friend. While there, one of the lions is accused by locals farmers of killing their livestock. Jaime investigates and discovers that it is a wild cougar. The farmer threatens to shoot the lion, but Jaime manages to convince them of the truth. Cast: Jack Kelly (Charles Keys), William Schallert (Bill Elgin), Mills Watson (Sheriff), Tippi Hedren (Susan Victor), Alicia Fleer (Katie), George D. Wallace (Rancher), Robbie Rist (Andrew), Robbie Wolcott (Mark), Sam Vlahos (1st Driver), Bob Basso (2nd Driver)
6	6	"The Deadly Missiles"	Alan J. Levi	Wilton Denmark	March 3, 1976
An illegal missile launch has occurred. Jaime goes to investigate on discovering that it seemed to have come from JT Connors' ranch - an old friend of hers. One of Connors' associates is responsible and threatens OSI with the launch of another missile, while holding Jaime and Connors to ransom. Steve Austin is on-hand however, and with his help, Jaime manages to prevent the launch. Cast: Lee Majors (Col. Steve Austin), Forrest Tucker (J.T. Connors), Ben Piazza (Warren Rayker), Howard McGillin (Staff Sgt.), Alicia Fleer (Katie), Christian Juttner (Teddy), Gary McLarty (1st Guard)
7	7	"Bionic Beauty"	Alan Crosland Jr.	James D. Parriott	March 17, 1976
Jaime goes undercover as Miss California in a beauty pageant. An important computer circuit has been stolen and the criminals plan to smuggle it out of the country via Miss Florida - the planted winner. However, Jaime is found out and, in order to keep an eye on her, she is announced the winner and is whisked away to be killed. Once in hiding, Jaime hits back and exposes the undercover crooks to Oscar and the circuit is returned. Cast: Bert Parks (Ray Raymond), Gary Crosby (Brady), Martha Scott (Helen Elgin), Helen Craig (Mrs. Belding), Cassie Yates (Sally Bartell), Charlotte Moore (Reporter), Henry Polic II (Man), Katie Hopkins Zerby (Miss Oklahoma), Lisa Parkes (Miss Tennessee)
8	8	"Jaime's Mother"	Leo Penn	Story by : Worley Thorne; Teleplay by : Arthur Rowe	March 24, 1976
Jaime meets a woman she believes to be her dead mother. The woman convinces her that she is and has been working as an undercover spy. However, the woman is in fact Chris Stuart, Jaime's mother's exact double and is now being hunted as a double agent. Jaime helps her regardless and stops the men chasing her and Oscar works with the government to show leniency towards Chris. Cast: Martha Scott (Helen Elgin), Barbara Rush (Chris Stuart / Ann Sommers), Joseph George (Vic Boylin), Norma Connolly (Mrs. Noah), Sam Chew Jr. (Mark Russell), Dan Barton (Henderson), Carlena Gower (Jaime as Little Girl)
9	9	"Winning is Everything"	Phil Bondelli	James D. Parriott	April 7, 1976
Jaime goes undercover in a desert drag car race to retrieve a government cassette tape. She soon discovers that the Russian drivers are also looking for the tape. Jaime, along with her driver, manages to get the tape and put the Russians out of action. Cast: Alejandro Rey (Carlos Scapini), John Elerick (Tim Sanders), Nancy Jeris (Russian Woman), Frank Cala (Bartender), Rene Assa (Attendant), Stephen Coit (Man)
10	10	"Canyon of Death"	Jerry London	Stephen Kandel	April 14, 1976
A Native American pupil of Jaime's has hidden away in the desert where a top secret project is being developed. They are testing an atomic-powered flying suit, which is also being watched by enemy agents. Attempting to find him, Jaime gets caught but escapes in time to catch the enemy who has donned the suit during a test flight. Cast: Gary Collins (John Mallory) Guillermo San Juan (Paco), Don McGovern (Briggs), Paul Cavonis (Henderson), Dee Timberlake (Karen Stone), Annette Cardona (Elora Mitchell), Robbie Rist (Andrew), Jack Stauffer (Captain Phillips), James Ingersoll (Radio Man), Bill Conklin (General Fuller), Todd London (Stan)
11	11	"Fly Jaime"	Barry Crane	Story by : Mann Rubin; Teleplay by : Mann Rubin & Arthur Rowe	May 5, 1976
Posing as a flight attendant, Jaime is undercover to protect Rudy who is on the flight with documents concerning a secret formula. When the plane is hijacked by people trying to kidnap Rudy, it crash lands on a deserted island. Jaime and Rudy hide for a time, are caught by the hijackers, but Jaime overpowers them and the pair are soon rescued. This episode is similar to "Survival of the Fittest," the second episode of The Six Million Dollar Man, in which Oscar (Richard Anderson), instead of Rudy, was targeted. Cast: Christopher Stone (Marlowe), Jerry Douglas (Connors), Spencer Milligan (Reed), Martin E. Brooks (Dr. Rudy Wells), Vito Scotti (Romero), Arline Anderson (Mrs. Griffith), Dick Valentine (Sam Diamond), Jim Raymond (Co-Pilot), John Zoller (Dr. Frankus), Joe Stefano (Captain), Larry Dunn (Radio Operator)
12	12	"The Jailing of Jaime"	Alan Crosland Jr.	Bruce Shelly	May 12, 1976
Couriering a decoding device, Jaime is unaware that she has delivered it into enemy hands. The following morning she is arrested and jailed for conspiracy and Oscar finds himself powerless against higher authorities. Jaime breaks out and discovers that the enemy is the original creator of the device, who says it is worthless and has siphoned away the millions spent on it. Locked in a safe about to explode, Jaime gets him to admit what he's done and breaks them out of the safe. Cast: Barry Sullivan (Ellis Hatch), Philip Abbott (John Naud), Skip Homeier (J.R. Gregory), Anne Schedeen (Milly Wilson), Tom Bower (Ted Ryan), Ron Hayes (Carlson), Sam Chew Jr. (Mark Russell), Ross Elliott (General Partridge), Walt Davis (MP), Jimmy Joyce (Guard), Scott Wells (Sheriff)
13	13	"Mirror Image"	Alan J. Levi	James D. Parriott	May 19, 1976
While on holiday, Jaime survives an attempt made on her life. Arriving back at OSI, she discovers that a woman, Lisa Galloway (also played by Wagner), has undergone plastic surgery to become her exact double. Galloway has fooled everyone and is stealing top secret documents. In a showdown between the two, Jaime proves who she is by using her bionics. Cast: Don Porter (James Courtney), Herbert Jefferson, Jr. (Baxley (aka "Beaumont")), Terry Kiser (Matthews), John Fink (Perkins), Ford Rainey (Jim Elgin), Harry Wiere (Tipsy), Sam Chew Jr. (Mark Russell), Fuddle Bagley (Bartender), Christopher Barrett (Intern)
14	14	"The Ghosthunter"	Kenneth Johnson	Kenneth Johnson and Justin Edgerton	May 26, 1976
Jaime goes undercover as a governess to Amanda, the daughter of a top scientist. Amanda declares that the house is haunted by her dead mother. However as supernatural events begin to occur, Jaime learns that it is actually Amanda herself who has telekinetic abilities. After events reach a climax, Jaime manages to calm her down and explains to Amanda what is causing all the disturbances. Cast: Paul Shenar (Alan Cory), Kristy McNichol (Amanda Cory), Bo Brundin (Emil Laslo), Merry Loomis (Nurse)

NOTES: ^1For years, "Welcome Home, Jaime," has been the subject of much debate and speculation in fan communities. For much of its post-broadcast life it was believed to have aired as originally intended: on Sunday, January 11, 1976 as a Six Million Dollar Man episode. But research for Time-Life's 2010 Six Million Dollar Man - The Complete DVD Collection revealed evidence to the contrary. Vintage promotional recordings and numerous newspaper articles indicate that "Welcome Home, Jaime," was pulled from the Six Million Dollar Man’s, Sunday night time slot, re-edited with Bionic Woman main/end titles and credits, issued a new production number, and pushed up to make its ABC broadcast début on Wednesday, January 14, 1976 as the première episode of The Bionic Woman. The 2010 DVD release of the first season The Bionic Woman went to press before this information was revealed, and thus incorrectly labels "Welcome Home Jaime" as part of The Six Million Dollar Man series.

=== Season 2 (1976–77) ===
- Regular cast: Lindsay Wagner (Jaime Sommers), Richard Anderson (Oscar Goldman), Martin E. Brooks (Dr. Rudy Wells)
- Producer: Kenneth Johnson

No. overall	No. in season	Title	Directed by	Written by	Original release date
15	1	"The Return of Bigfoot: Part 2"	Barry Crane	Kenneth Johnson	September 22, 1976
Steve's life is hanging in the balance so Jaime must go and fight the Sasquatch. She discovers that it is being controlled by enemy agents and with the help of Gillian and Shalon, they overcome this control and help Steve. Jaime, Steve, and the Sasquatch then undo the damage the enemy aliens have caused to the Earth's crust by creating a time distortion. Cast: Lee Majors (Col. Steve Austin), John Saxon (Nedlick), Stephen Young (Dallet), Severn Darden (Apploy), Ted Cassidy (Sasquatch), Sandy Duncan (Gillian), Stefanie Powers (Shalon), Charles Cyphers (Faler)
16	2	"In This Corner, Jaime Sommers"	Alan Crosland Jr.	Story by : Robert McCullough; Teleplay by : Robert McCullough and Kenneth Johnson	September 29, 1976
Jaime goes undercover as a female wrestler looking for an OSI agent who has gone missing while trying to uncover what is going on. Jaime discovers that the boss is corrupt and in alliance with a Russian double agent. After being drugged and left to suffocate, Jaime recovers and catches the villains, while uncovering a top secret component they have stolen. Cast: Norman Fell (Milt Bigelow), Marcia Lewis (April Armitage), Marj Dusay (Dr. Brandes), Marcia Shapiro (Mary Maddox), Lew Palter (Announcer), Bill Keene (Mr. Epstein), Brett Dunham (Wayne Haley), Bill Conklin (Man), Margaret Shocklee (Esther), Gene LeBell (Referee), Sandy Parker (Battling Betty)
17	3	"Assault on the Princess"	Alan Crosland Jr.	Wilton Denmark	October 6, 1976
Two energy cells have been smuggled aboard a cruise liner, the Princess Louise. Jaime goes undercover as a card dealer to locate "the Iceman" who has the cells, as the Iceman is threatening to detonate the cells if the liner fails to rendezvous with a submarine. Learning that the cells will explode if heated, Jaime and an admirer manage to save the day and catch the Iceman and his cohorts. Cast: Ed Nelson (Lucky Harrison), Vito Scotti (Romero), John Durren (Grover), Steve Kanaly (Tanner), Dick Dinman (Ice Man), Tony Giorgio (Creighton), Ron Wilson (Joe), Abraham Alvarez (Lieutenant), Don Maxwell (Crewman)
18	4	"Road to Nashville"	Alan J. Levi	James D. Parriott	October 20, 1976
Reports of top-secret information being passed in code through the recordings of country and western star Buck Buckley has come to light, and Jaime goes to Nashville to investigate. Jaime, however, is discovered and locked in a burning studio while Buck is forced to go on stage where the final piece of information will be transmitted. Jaime escapes and stops it, revealing the villains to be Bucks's girlfriend and his record producer. Cast: Hoyt Axton (Buck Buckley), Bert Kramer (Penn Mathers), Doc Severinsen (Muffin Calhoun), Fionnula Flanagan (Tammy Dalton), Scott Arthur Allen (Bill), Dick Haynes (Announcer), Stacey O'Brien (Stacy), Bob Beck (Len), Earl Billings (Skycap), Robin Harlan (Pam)
19	5	"Kill Oscar: Part 1"	Alan Crosland Jr.	Story by : Arthur Rowe and Oliver Crawford; Teleplay by : Arthur Rowe	October 27, 1976
Dr. Franklin, a former OSI scientist, is working on a project to create female androids, which he names "Fembots". He is funded by a Russian minister who is working with Franklin to gain the U.S. government's new weather control device. Oscar is kidnapped and held for ransom by the fembots. As Jaime battles the fembots, she discovers that their power surpasses hers and she is rendered unconscious before Steve arrives to assist. (Part 1 of 3; "Kill Oscar: Part 2" continues in The Six Million Dollar Man, Season 4, Episode 6. Cast: John Houseman (Dr. Franklin), Jack Colvin (Baron Constantine), Jennifer Darling (Peggy Callahan), Corinne Michaels (Lynda Wilson), Jack L. Ging (Jack Hanson), Lee Majors (Col. Steve Austin), Janice Whitby (Katy), John Dewey-Carter (Rawlins), James R. Parkes (Guard), Don Fenwick (Agent #1), Larry French (Agent #2)
20	6	"Kill Oscar: Part 3"	Alan Crosland Jr.	Story by : Arthur Rowe and Oliver Crawford; Teleplay by : Arthur Rowe	November 3, 1976
The effects of the extreme weather conditions created by the weather control device are worldwide, and government officials get together at The Pentagon to form a plan to destroy Franklin's island (where Oscar is being held captive). Hearing this, Jaime and Steve attempt to rescue him. Steve and Jaime traveled by submarine. Later, Steve and Jaime with their wetsuits and scuba gear on themselves exited the submarine via torpedo tubes, and arrived on the island. Fighting fembots and the extreme weather conditions, they arrive at the base. With fembots being steadily put out of action, a furious Franklin localizes the hurricane effect with plans to destroy everyone. With the base collapsing around them, Jaime and Steve get Oscar and Franklin away as the device destroys itself. (Part 3 of 3). Cast: Lee Majors (Col. Steve Austin), John Houseman (Dr. Franklin), Jennifer Darling (Peggy Callahan), Jack L. Ging (Jack Hanson), James McMullan (Commander Gordon), Sam Jaffe (Admiral Richter), Janice Whitby (Katy), Eugene Peterson (General Williams), Byron Morrow (Admiral Wilkins), John Dewey-Carter (Rawlins), Walt Davis (Crewman), Howard K. Smith (Himself)
21	7	"Black Magic"	Barry Crane	Arthur Rowe	November 10, 1976
Millionaire Cyrus Carstairs has died leaving a fortune as well as a top-secret formula. Jaime goes there acting as an estranged niece, as Carstairs has devised a hunt for the will with the finder to be the beneficiary. Coming up against Carstairs' devious family, Jaime discovers that the butler is the most devious of all. Working with the family, Jaime finds the will and the formula. Cast: Vincent Price (Manfred Carstairs / Cyrus Carstairs), William Windom (Warfield), Hermione Baddeley (Aunt Tess), Julie Newmar (Claudette), Abe Vigoda (Barlow), Alvah Stanley (Barry), Roger Til (Maitre D'), George Margo (Boatman)
22	8	"Sister Jaime"	Alan J. Levi	Kenneth Johnson	November 24, 1976
Jaime goes undercover in a convent to uncover a smuggling ring. To her shock, the Mother Superior is involved, but explains she needed the money to save the convent from closure. Although the Mother Superior realizes that her actions were unjust even despite her aims, she begs for forgiveness. Jaime agrees to help and delays Oscar & OSI long enough to place the evidence solely with the smugglers. Cast: Kathleen Nolan (Mother Superior), Catherine Burns (Sister Beverly), Ellen Geer (Sister Barbara), Ron Hayes (Father Thomas), Dran Hamilton (Sister Margo), Al Hansen (Trucker), Luke Andreas (1st Man), Edward Cross (2nd Man), Cynthia Whitham (Marlene Stoler) Note: Most of the music for this episode is based on Jesu, Joy of Man's Desiring by Johann Sebastian Bach.
23	9	"The Vega Influence"	Mel Damski	Arthur Rowe (screenwriter)	December 1, 1976
A government base on a remote island has uncovered a strange meteorite. Jaime arrives to find that the local people have been taken over by the meteorite's sonic power and are acting strangely. Jaime, protected by her bionic ear, and a deaf girl attempt to stop the effects of the meteorite, but are attacked by the locals who are bent on protecting it. Jaime manages to render the meteorite dormant by freezing it. Cast: Rick Lenz (Michael Marchetti), Jamie Smith Jackson (Laurie Boylin), Roy Poole (Dr. Boylin), Philip Carey (Major Andrews), Don Marshall (Captain Colter), John Lawrence (Sergeant Roberts)
24	10	"Jaime's Shield: Part 1"	Alan Crosland Jr.	James D. Parriott	December 15, 1976
It is discovered that a foreign agent is working undercover as a female police cadet and Jaime goes undercover to find her. However, the agent has learned of Jaime's identity and tries to have her killed. Cast: George Maharis (Bob Welton), James McEachin (Captain Godfrey), Diane Civita (Arleen), Rebecca Balding (Parker), William Bryant (Captain Jetton), Archie Johnson (Sam Hart), Linden Chiles (Herb Partnow), Michael Santiago (Baxter)
25	11	"Jaime's Shield: Part 2"	Barry Crane	James D. Parriott	December 22, 1976
Jaime discovers that the foreign agent is working with other agents posing as police in order to assassinate a visiting foreign diplomat. She, along with the help of another officer, uncover the plan and stop the agents. Cast: George Maharis (Bob Welton), Diane Civita (Arleen), Rebecca Balding (Parker), William Bryant (Captain Jetton), Archie Johnson (Sam Hart), Linden Chiles (Herb Partnow), Michael Santiago (Baxter), Amapola Del Vando (Rinja Gabrin), Amy Joyce (Rosignano), Larry Frank Ellis (Dispatcher), Norma Ransom (Old Lady)
26	12	"Biofeedback"	Alan J. Levi	Daniel Kibbie	January 12, 1977
Two brothers working at the OSI are involved in very different fields. Payton, a cryptographer and Darwin, an expert looking into biofeedback - a process of self-mind control. Payton is selling a top secret decoder to enemy agents, while Darwin along with Jaime infiltrate the German base using Jaime's bionics and his biofeedback processes. Cast: Granville Van Dusen (Darwin Jones), Lloyd Bochner (Ivan Kard), Peter Haskell (Payton Jones), Jan Aaris (Marek), Inge Lindgreen (Terry)
27	13	"Doomsday is Tomorrow: Part 1"	Kenneth Johnson	Kenneth Johnson	January 19, 1977
Dr. Elijah Cooper, an aging scientist is holding the world hostage with his newly developed cobalt bomb. If his demands of nuclear disarmament and world peace are not met, he will detonate the bomb which will destroy all life on Earth. Delegates from the United Nations go to Cooper's complex to discuss the doomsday weapon, and Jaime goes undercover in order to talk to him. Upon arriving, she finds that Cooper is dying and his orders have been passed over to the central computer ALEX which has been ordered to carry out Cooper's instructions; Jaime must find a way to stop it. Cast: Lew Ayres (Elijah Cooper), Kenneth O'Brien (Dmitri Muskov), David Opatoshu (Satari), Sam Chew Jr. (Russ), James Hong (Kurosawa), Guerin Barry (ALEX)
28	14	"Doomsday is Tomorrow: Part 2"	Kenneth Johnson	Kenneth Johnson	January 26, 1977
A Mideastern government doesn't believe Cooper's threat and proceeds with a nuclear bomb test, which triggers ALEX to set the doomsday bomb in motion. Meanwhile, Jaime attempts to get into the central core of the complex where the bomb's circuitry is contained, but she is impeded by ALEX at every step. Eventually arriving at the core, Jaime is unable to disarm the device. She discovers however that bomb is fake and was a ploy by Cooper to gain world peace. Nevertheless, ALEX is still bent on carrying out Cooper's instructions and has computed an alternate method to achieve the same result. In panic, Jaime sets off the emergency sprinkler system which destroys all the electronic circuitry - including ALEX. --- Cast: Lew Ayres (Elijah Cooper), Kenneth O'Brien (Dmitri Muskov), David Opatoshu (Satari), Sam Chew Jr. (Russ), James Hong (Kurosawa), Stack Pierce (Navigator), Ned Wilson (Pilot), Guerin Barry (ALEX), George Whiteman (Co-Pilot), Steve Powers (E.W.O.), Ed Vasgersian (Technician)
29	15	"Deadly Ringer: Part 1"	Alan J. Levi	James D. Parriott	February 2, 1977
Jaime's look-alike Lisa Galloway has broken out of prison with the help of Dr. Courtney and others. In her place, Jaime is imprisoned. Dr. Courtney believes Jaime's strength is due to a chemical compound Rudy has developed called Adrenalizine and wants Lisa to get it. However, as Lisa settles into Jaime's life, she keeps the drug for herself. After a near mental breakdown, Jaime manages to escape the prison but is being chased by security. Cast: Don Porter (James Courtney), Warren Kemmerling (Warden Cooper), Katherine Helmond (Dr. Harkens), Ford Rainey (Jim Elgin), Ruth Kobart (Guard), John Zenda (Weber), Lou Fant (Convict), Jack Kutcher (Guard), Angela Hoffman (Jody), Billy Rittenbaugh (Arty), Jeffrey Whipple (Bill), Stacy O'Brien (Terry), Pat St. James (Convict)
30	16	"Deadly Ringer: Part 2"	Alan J. Levi	James D. Parriott	February 9, 1977
With Jaime about to be shot, she manages to convince Oscar of her real identity. Lisa however is losing control of reality as she becomes addicted to the Adrenalizine and starts to believe she really is Jaime. With Dr. Courtney and the others arrested, Jaime must get to Lisa, who has already fooled Jamie's stepparents. Further complicating the problem is Rudy's discovery that Adrenalizine breaks down and becomes toxic. Now completely delusional, Lisa attempts to kill Jaime before finally breaking down, and Jaime helps Lisa get medical attention. Cast: Don Porter (James Courtney), Warren Kemmerling (Warden Cooper), Katherine Helmond (Dr. Harkens), Ford Rainey (Jim Elgin), Martha Scott (Helen Elgin), Don "Red" Barry (Woody), John Zenda (Weber), Don Fenwick (Ohanian), Walt Davis (Trooper), Angela Hoffman (Jody), Billy Rittenbaugh (Arty), Stacy O'Brien (Terry)
31	17	"Jaime and the King"	Alan Crosland Jr.	Robert L. McCullough, C. Robert Brooks and Arthur Rowe	February 23, 1977
Jaime is sent to Monte Carlo to be a tutor for Ishmael, a young Prince of a Persian Gulf nation. Jaime's mission is to protect Ishmael and his father from a planned assassination. However, Jaime's cover is blown and she is thrown out. However, having gained Ishmael's confidence, she regains entry and saves his father's life. Cast: Robert Loggia (Ali bin Gazim), Lance Kerwin (Ishmael), Joseph Ruskin (Hassan), Rene Assa (Major-Domo), Annette Cardona (Emerald), Brioni Farrell (Ezelda), Tanya L. George (Marahna), Nathan Roth (Guard)
32	18	"Beyond the Call"	Alan J. Levi	Story by : Dan Kibbie; Teleplay by : Dan Kibbie and Arthur Rowe	March 9, 1977
Jaime is looking after Kim, a young girl who has become withdrawn and erratic since her Vietnamese mother's death. Her father, a major who served in the Vietnam War has become corrupted and plans to steal a top-secret missile guidance system. In order to help them both, Jaime contrives a reconciliation between Kim and her father, which leads him to mend his ways. Cast: Sam Groom (John Cross), Ford Rainey (Jim Elgin), Martha Scott (Helen Elgin), Mariel Aragon (Kim), Sandy Ward (Colonel Banning), Madison Arnold (Willet), Billy Rittenbaugh (Arty), June Kim (Kim's Mother), Ron McCabe (Luddick)
33	19	"The DeJon Caper"	Barry Crane	Arthur Rowe	March 16, 1977
Jaime enlists the help of art forger Pierre Lambert to uncover a forgery scam. After witnessing the theft of a DeJon painting, Jaime gets Pierre to recreate it and switch it before the thieves can exchange it. Jaime arrives and points out that the painting the buyer has been sold is a forgery by revealing that the paint is still wet. Cast: René Auberjonois (Pierre Lambert), Sydney Chaplin (Alfredo Moreau), Bernard Behrens (Michael Beaumont), Roger Til (Rochette), Erik Holland (Alain), Ben Wright (Fournier)
34	20	"The Night Demon"	Alan J. Levi	Justin Edgerton	March 23, 1977
Jaime visits an old friend, Thomas, who has uncovered a relic called the Night Demon. The locals believe it to be cursed, however Thomas tells Jaime that local landowners are attempting to buy his land and are trying to scare him away. Jaime is then haunted at night by a large black creature, resembling the Night Demon. On investigating, she discovers it is only a costume and dons it herself to scare away the landowners. Cast: Jeff Corey (Thomas Bearclaw), John Quade (Hawkins), Gary Lockwood (Lyle Cannon), Howard McGillin (Sgt. Don Woods), J. Jay Saunders (Capt. Anders)
35	21	"Iron Ships and Dead Men"	Mel Damski	James D. Parriott	March 30, 1977
On a personal mission for Oscar, Jaime boards an old World War II destroyer to investigate the death of Oscar's brother. Working as a salvage worker, she uncovers a 36-year-old plot involving some stolen money which coincided with the attack on Pearl Harbor. Jaime then discovers that Oscar's brother was murdered, and Oscar is finally able to give his brother a proper burial at sea. Cast: Ed Walsh (Dean Zanetos), Theodore Wilson (Warner Williams), Ray Young (Bob Richards), Stephen Elliott (Duke), Peter Lempert (Sam Goldman), Mikhail Kulik (Young Duke)
36	22	"Once a Thief"	Alan J. Levi	Kenneth Johnson	May 4, 1977
Inky, a petty crook who has filmed Jaime using her bionics, threatens to release the film if she doesn't help him rob a bank. Oscar encourages her to assist so he can arrest Inky for his crimes and to uncover the crime ring with whom Inky is involved. The ring leader, however, steps in and holds Jaime and Inky hostage. Inky's pet monkey sets off the alarm, revealing their whereabouts, and Oscar and his men go in and arrest the criminals. Cast: Elisha Cook (Carl "Inky" Inkervoya), Ed Barth (Sully), Dick Bakalyan (Gino Talvin), Dick Balduzzi (Rogers), Richard Libertini (Rick), William Boyett (Captain Blank), Mickey Morton (Davis), Fuddle Bagley (Reggie), Paula Victor (Winnie), Frank Cala (Steinhauer), Sonny Klein (Marchese), Don Maxwell (Policeman)

=== Season 3 (1977–78) ===
- Regular cast: Lindsay Wagner (Jaime Sommers), Richard Anderson (Oscar Goldman), Martin E. Brooks (Dr. Rudy Wells)
- Producers: Lionel E. Siegel, Arthur Rowe, James D. Parriott, Ralph Sarriego, Nancy Malone, Joseph D'Agosta

No. overall	No. in season	Title	Directed by	Written by	Original release date
37	1	"The Bionic Dog: Part 1"	Barry Crane	Story by : Harve Bennett and James D. Parriott; Teleplay by : James D. Parriott	September 10, 1977
Jaime discovers that Rudy has a bionic dog called Max and he reveals that Max was the first bionic experiment, but is now beginning to reject his bionics in old age. Discovering that Max is going to be put to sleep, and remembering her own struggle when her bionics were originally implanted, Jaime is determined to help Max back to health. Against Rudy's wishes, she takes Max outside the lab. Upon catching up to them, Rudy tells her that a post-mortem examination will be performed on Max. Jaime then escapes the lab with Max. Cast: Ford Rainey (Jim Elgin), Taylor Lacher (Crosby), Carlene Watkins (Judy McHugh), Al Hansen (Trucker), Jay Fenichel (Doughnut Man), David Himes (Animal Handler)
38	2	"The Bionic Dog: Part 2"	Barry Crane	Story by : Harve Bennett and James D. Parriott; Teleplay by : James D. Parriott	September 17, 1977
Jaime and Max escape to the mountains where they stay with Roger, an old friend of Jaime's. The OSI are searching for the pair, but a forest fire has begun trapping Jaime and Max. Attempting to escape, Max overcomes his fear of fire and helps to rescue Jaime and Roger who succeed in fleeing the fire in an old steam engine. Upon rescue, Rudy realizes that Max wasn't rejecting his bionics, but was merely manifesting his fear of fire. Cast: Dale Robinette (Roger Grette), Ford Rainey (Jim Elgin), Lee Jones-De Broux (Bill Tyler), Will Hare (Harley), Al Hansen (Trucker), Jack Garner (County Sheriff), Jason Johnson (Old Man)
39	3	"Fembots in Las Vegas: Part 1"	Michael Preece	Arthur Rowe	September 24, 1977
Dr. Franklin's son Carl has reactivated the fembots and he wants revenge against the OSI by gaining control of a satellite energy ray weapon. Once again, Jaime finds herself up against the female robots as attempts are made by OSI to get to Franklin's base. Cast: James Olson (Rod Kyler), Jennifer Darling (Peggy Callahan), Melinda Fee (Tami Cross), Alexander Courtney (Dan Mayers), Michael Burns (Carl Franklin), Stanley Brock (Stage Manager), Jeannie Wilson (Nancy), Nancy Bleier (Gina), Lorna Sands (Billie), Lisa Moore (Ellen Andrews), Michael J. London (Security Guard)
40	4	"Fembots in Las Vegas: Part 2"	Michael Preece	Arthur Rowe	October 1, 1977
Franklin has gained control of the satellite weapon and captures Oscar, Rudy, and Jaime. However, Rudy has devised a plan to direct the weapon at the complex while Jaime fights off the fembots. The countdown has started as the fembots have been disabled, but their escape is prevented by Carl, who reveals himself to be a robot. Jaime tangles with him, and he ultimately meets his destruction; meanwhile, Oscar and Rudy wait in safe shelter for Jaime to make it out, as the base begins to explode. Cast: James Olson (Rod Kyler), Jennifer Darling (Peggy Callahan), Melinda Fee (Tami Cross), Michael Burns (Carl Franklin), Jeannie Wilson (Nancy), Nancy Bleier (Gina), Lorna Sands (Billie), Lisa Moore (Ellen Andrews), Douglas Hale (Launch Director), Paul Tinder (Asst. Launch Director), Ted Schliesman (Lt. Rogers)
41	5	"Rodeo"	Larry Stewart	Herman Groves	October 15, 1977
Oscar is concerned that one of the OSI scientists is putting his safety at risk to indulge his love of competing in rodeos. Oscar assigns Jaime to go with him for protection. Jaime becomes his partner at the rodeo as they go on to win. Cast: Andrew Prine (William "Billy" Cole), Jason Evers (Radnick), John Crawford (Crowley), Thomas Bellin (Janos), Don Gentry (Teak), Rodolfo Hoyos Jr. (Carlos), Linda Wiser (Lab Technician)
42	6	"African Connection"	Alan J. Levi	William Schwartz	October 29, 1977
Jaime travels to Africa to ensure that a dictator doesn't win the next election despite his attempts to rig the voting machine. Jaime crosses the jungle with an unwilling Harry Walker. Upon reaching the leader's base, they are about to be shot, but Jaime manages to escape with the help of a friend. Jaime then switches the voting machine, resulting in the election going against the dictator. Cast: Dan O'Herlihy (Harry Walker), Don Pedro Colley (Duma), Joan Pringle (Leona Mumbassa), Raymond St. Jacques (Azzar), Kipp Whitman (Serrano), Marc Alaimo (Hopper), Charles Walker II (Rasan), Roger Til (Robaire), Renny Temple (Englishman), Ron Trice (Meko), Bob Minor (Major)
43	7	"Motorcycle Boogie"	Ken Gilbert	James D. Parriott and Kenneth Johnson	November 5, 1977
In an attempt to retrieve a stolen computer tape in East Germany, Jaime unwittingly enlists the help of Evel Knievel, who is touring there. Escaping bullets and bombs, the pair manage to get to the base and retrieve the tape. Cast: Evel Knievel (Himself), Bernard Behrens (Major Petrov), Spencer Milligan (Schmidt), Jon M. Benson (New Guard), Chris Anders (1st Guard), Erik Holland (2nd Guard), Dennis Williams (Lab Technician), Patrick Gorman (Mover), Dirk Olthof (Young Cop), Peter Hellmann (1st Door Guard), John Brandon (Promoter)
44	8	"Brain Wash"	Michael Preece	James D. Parriott	November 12, 1977
While at the hair salon, Jaime overhears Callahan giving away top secret OSI information. Jaime informs Oscar who fires Callahan, despite her protests of innocence. Returning to the salon, Jaime discovers the owner, John, has tapes of secret information and realizes that the shampoo being used releases a chemical that acts as a "truth serum". Jaime reveals this to Oscar who reinstates Callahan, and John is arrested. Cast: Michael Callan (John Bernard), Jennifer Darling (Callahan), Sam Chew Jr. (Mark Russell), David Watson (Benny), Pepe Hern (Pinedo), Gregory Elliot (Office Boy), Larry Duran (Gardener), Richard Sarradet (Agent), Federico Roberto (Man), Lady Helena Walquer (Jenny)
45	9	"Escape to Love"	Alan J. Levi	Ellen Wittman	November 26, 1977
An American scientist's son has been captured in East Germany, and Jaime is sent in to rescue him. The teenage boy, Sandor, complicates the mission when he falls in love with her. After some near disasters, Jaime gets the pair out and explains to Sandor that she doesn't share his feelings. Cast: Philip Abbott (Arlo Kelso), John Reilly (Hober), Mitchell Laurance (Sandor Kelso), Peter Mark Richman (Colonel Dubnov), Michael Richardson (Lt. Pruska), Ed Sancho-Bonet (Rodi)
46	10	"Max"	Don McDougall	Story by : William Schwartz & Lionel E. Siegel; Teleplay by : William Schwartz	December 3, 1977
Valerie, an OSI scientist working on a tracking unit for bionic dog Max, is looking after him with her nephew Bobby. While Jaime is out of action on account of some bionic tests, Max is stolen and held for ransom. It is up to Valerie and Bobby to rescue him. Cast: Neile Adams-McQueen (Valerie Breuer), Christopher Knight (Bobby), Bill Fletcher (Hobbs), Sandy Kenyon (Yvon Sanders), Rudy Solari (Jack Carson), Sam Chew Jr. (Mark Russell), Bucklind Beery (Andrews), Pete Dunn (OSI Agent)
47	11	"Over the Hill Spy"	Kenneth Gilbert	Joseph A. Viola	December 17, 1977
Oscar persuades Quinn, a retired OSI agent, to help with a mission to capture a Soviet spy. He reluctantly agrees and goes with Jaime to catch Slotsky, a nemesis of Quinn from his earlier time in the OSI. After a series of mishaps they capture Slotsky, but Jaime realizes they are actually old friends. Considering their age, Jaime allows them to go their own way, telling Oscar they escaped. Cast: Richard Erdman (Terrence Quinn), Jeff David (Vilmos Vanovic), Michael Thoma (Boris Slotsky), Felice Orlandi (Juan Robles), Whit Bissell (Wolfe), Rick Beckner (Manning), Dante Deandre (Maitre D'), Eve McVeagh (Middle Aged Woman), Mary Jackson (Martha), Alana Collins (Carol), Michael Quinn (Delegate), Norman Gibbs (Man)
48	12	"All for One"	Larry Stewart	James D. Parriott	January 7, 1978
Oscar discovers that large sums of money have gone missing via their computer system, and he sends Jaime to a university where the hacking computer has been traced. Jaime goes undercover as a student and meets up with the culprit who is actually using the money to put 38 people through college. She gains his confidence, but finds that other parties want information from the hacked computer. Cast: Roger Perry (Thomas Tharp), Henry Kingi (Mango), Gary Barton (Stubbs), Viola Kates Stimpson (Mrs. Simpson), Franklyn Ajaye (Benny Jeffries), Garret Pearson (Raul), Joe Al Nicassio (Mr. A. A.)
49	13	"The Pyramid"	Barry Crane	Story by : Margaret Armen & Alf Harris; Teleplay by : Margaret Armen & Alf Harris and Arthur Rowe & Lionel E. Siegel	January 14, 1978
Attempting to repair the ozone layer using an energy ray missile, the OSI becomes aware of some strange emissions from a pyramid. Jaime and her paramour Chris go to investigate. There the couple meet an alien who warns that their missile will lead to the destruction of Earth, as his people will see it as an attack and retaliate. It is up to Jaime to reason with them. Cast: Christopher Stone (Chris Williams), Eduard Franz (Ky), Gavan O'Herlihy (Jim Burns), Henry Kingi (Inca Warrior), June Barrett (Laure Kane), Brancombe Richmond (Security Guard)
50	14	"The Antidote"	Don McDougall	Story by : Daniel Ullman; Teleplay by : Arthur Rowe and Tom August & Helen August	January 21, 1978
A secret conference between the US and the Soviets is taking place. Jaime becomes involved, but is poisoned by enemy agents intent on disrupting the conference. Jaime is dying and the agents have informed the OSI that they must gain access to the conference in return for the antidote. With Jaime close to death it is up to her OSI friends, including Chris and Max, to help. Cast: Christopher Stone (Chris Williams), Harry Rhodes (Waiter/Doctor), Suzanne Charny (Waitress/Nurse), Brett Halsey (Dr. Hamilton), James Blendick (Chief Inspector Ball), John Myhers (Dmitri Zhukov), John Milford (Henderson), Jennifer Darling (Peggy Callahan), Danny Wells (Yanos), Linda Wiser (Sarah)
51	15	"The Martians Are Coming, The Martians Are Coming"	Larry Stewart	Story by : Robert A. Urso; Teleplay by : Robert A. Urso and Tom August & Helen August	January 28, 1978
While working on a project, Rudy and fellow scientist Fisk are abducted by a UFO. Witnessed by Jaime, she investigates and discovers that it is an elaborate hoax - the UFO is actually a helicopter hidden by a hologram. However, Fisk is involved in the hoax as he is intent on selling their project. Jaime goes in, but is captured and locked in a freezer. She and Rudy eventually escape and bring Fisk to justice. Cast: James McMullan (Casey), Jack Kelly (Ray Fisk), Frank Marth (Bill Robbins), Frank Aletter (Spencer), Lynn Carlin (Norma Fisk), Jon Locke (Cigar Smoker), Ruth Manning (Cigar Smoker's Wife), Phil Hoover (Patrolman), Amanda Davies (Nena), Barbara Iley (Television Commentator), Brent Davis (1st Reporter), Cynthia Songe (2nd Reporter), Warren Miller (Harger), Paul Coufos (Pilot)
52	16	"Sanctuary Earth"	Ernest Pintoff	Rudolph Borchert	February 11, 1978
A satellite returns to Earth containing an alien girl, Aura. Jaime becomes involved and brings Aura back to her apartment. Aura is under threat from other aliens, who arrive to kidnap her. Jaime manages to fend them off, and Aura is transported back to her home planet. Cast: Christopher Stone (Chris Williams), Helen Hunt (Princess Aura), Jim Hager (Verm), Jon Hager (Dier), David Matthau (Belden)
53	17	"Deadly Music"	Tom Connors III	Lionel E. Siegel & Conner Everts	February 18, 1978
An enemy scientist has developed an underwater sonar device which attracts sharks. Investigating, Jaime eventually goes underwater and finds herself having to fend off the killer sharks. Cast: Frank Converse (Jed Kimball), Henry Darrow (Anton Dasovic), Chip Lucia (Ritter), Robert Ellenstein (Henry Klempt), James Crittenden (Marsden), Roger Cruz (Frank Dade), Darrow Igus (Reese), Michael Boyle (Crewman), Greg Barnett (Steve)
54	18	"Which One is Jaime"	Jack Arnold	Story by : Martha Humphreys & Ted Pedersen; Teleplay by : Jim Carlson & Terrence McDonnell	February 25, 1978
Enemy agents intent on kidnapping Jaime mistakenly take Callahan. Jaime goes in, but is captured as well. With the help of Max, they manage to escape and stop the kidnappers. Cast: Jennifer Darling (Peggy Callahan), Sam Chew Jr. (Mark Russell), James Sikking (Ray Burns), Brock Peters (Jake Stratton), Marcus Mukai (Colin Lee), Robert Feero (Eddie Dwyer), Regis J. Cordic (Roger Fowler), Adrien Royce (Julie), Peter Zapp (Roger)
55	19	"Out of Body"	Ernest Pintoff	Story by : Steven E. deSouza and Deborah Blum; Teleplay by : Steven E. deSouza	March 4, 1978
Tommy, an American Indian friend of Jaime's, has been injured while working on a project and is left in a coma. A plan is in place to steal a devastating bomb, but Jaime is assisted by Tommy's spirit which has left his body. She manages to stop the criminals and Tommy comes out of his coma. Cast: Nehemiah Persoff (Philip Jennings), Richard Lynch (Denton), Antony Ponzini (Mauro), Charlie Hill (Tommy Littlehorse), Allan Magicovsky (Jacoby), Barbara Baldavin (Nurse), Jeannie Newburn (Mother), Agustin Vallejo (Father)
56	20	"Long Live the King"	Gwen Arner	Anthony DiMarco & David Ketchum	March 25, 1978
A Middle Eastern king is visiting the U.S., but an assassination has been planned. Jaime goes undercover as his secretary to prevent it, and eventually manages to foil the murder plot and save the king. Cast: John Reilly (Sam Sloan), Carmen Argenziano (King Kusari), Charles M. Cioffi (Colonel Mostada), Madison Arnold (John), Lou Tiano (Nick), Rene Assa (Kia), Stanley Brock (Wally), Dov Gottesfeld (Sharokah), Rachel Bard (Lynette), Elise Caitlin (Beth), Brian Burgess (Mr. Byron)
57	21	"Rancho Outcast"	Ivan Dixon	Arthur Rowe	May 6, 1978
The engraving plate for the U.S. hundred dollar bill has been stolen and traced to the Mexican village of Hidalgo. Jaime goes in to retrieve it, but finds herself up against a town full of killers and thieves. She retrieves the plate, but it looks unlikely she'll get out alive. With the help of an assistant, they manage to cause a flood and escape. Cast: Keenan Wynn (Gustave), Don Calfa (Petey "The Weasel" Regan), Diane Civita (Mrs. Frank Boylin), Henry Kingi (One-Eyed-One), Robert Easton (Colonel), Dave Cass (Janos), George Kee Cheung (2nd Agent)
58	22	"On the Run"	Tom Blank	Steven E. deSouza	May 13, 1978
Becoming tired and depressed, Jaime submits her resignation from the OSI to Oscar. The U.S. government informs Oscar that Jaime is not free to go considering her involvement with many top secret missions, but agrees to let her retire in a complex for ex-agents. Appalled, Jaime goes on the run with the government in pursuit. Jaime is eventually captured and agrees to go back to work, but on her own terms to allow for more of a personal life. Cast: Christopher Stone (Chris Williams), Skip Homeier (Senator Renshaw), Andrew Duggan (Dep. Director Parr), Linda Wiser (Sarah), Juno Dawson (Agent Harding), Mariel Aragon (Reiko), Johnny Timko (Tommy), Robert L. Benedetti (Balloon Man)

=== Television movies ===
- Regular cast: Lindsay Wagner (Jaime Sommers), Lee Majors (Steve Austin), Richard Anderson (Oscar Goldman), Martin E. Brooks (Dr. Rudy Wells)

Title	Directed by	Written by	Original release date
The Return of the Six Million Dollar Man and the Bionic Woman	Ray Austin	Michael Sloan, Bruce Lansbury	May 17, 1987
Oscar is keen to recruit the retired Steve Austin to capture a group of criminals who are looking into the secrets of bionics. Steve refuses until his son is injured in an airplane crash; at which point Steve agrees to help if his son's life can be saved via bionics. Jaime arrives to help Steve's son come to terms with his new abilities, while Steve is keen to rekindle their romance. The three then find the criminals and bring their operations to a halt. Cast: Tom Schanley (Michael Austin), Martin Landau (Lyle Stenning), Gary Lockwood (John Praiser), Will Bledsoe (Tom Brubaker), Gary Blumsack (Jerry Dreyfuss), William Campbell (General Forest), Robert F. Hoy (Kyle), Terry Kiser ("Santiago"), Cheryl McMannis (Carol), Patrick Pankhurst (Duke Rennecker), Bob Seagren (Martin), Danil Torppe (Reardon), Susan Woollen (Trish Sullivan), Scott Kraft (Nick), Bryan Cranston (Dr. Shepherd), Keith Farrell (Jim Matlon), Phil Nordell (Christopher), Pamela Bryant (Blonde Girl), Catherine McGoohan (Receptionist), Deborah White (Sally), Kawena Charlot (Megan), Sandey Grinn (Waiter), Leonard Kibrick (Jensen), Michele Minailo (Holly), Julie H. Morgan (Hostess)
Bionic Showdown: The Six Million Dollar Man and the Bionic Woman	Alan J. Levi	Michael Sloan, Robert DeLaurentis, Brock Choy	April 30, 1989
With Jaime helping new bionic recruit Kate, an enemy agent who also has bionics has come to light and the people behind him are determined to put an end to the OSI. Oscar then calls on Jaime and Steve to find the agents and end their work. Cast: Robert Lansing (General John McAllister), Sandra Bullock (Kate Mason), Lee Majors II (Jim Castillian), Geraint Wyn Davies (Alan Devlin), Jeff Yagher (Jim Goldman), Lawrence Dane (General Dzerinsky), Josef Sommer (Charles Esterman), Andrew R. Dan (Comrade Yuri Kellagyn), Carolynn Dunn (Sally), Jack Blum (Larry), David Adamson (Sergeant Randall), James Kee (OSI Officer), Marcia Levine (Tanya Fersova), Robert McClure (Dr. Williams), David Nerman (Peter), Steve Pernie (Russ), Steve Morris (Sports Announcer)
Bionic Ever After?	Steven Stafford	Michael Sloan, Norman Morrill	November 29, 1994
Jaime and Steve are to marry, but Jaime's bionics begin to fail. It's soon discovered that it's a virus developed by enemy agents threatening her as the agents attempt to use a nuclear missile. Steve comes to the rescue but not before he is also stricken with the virus. The pair eventually recover in time to stop the criminals and, twenty years after first becoming engaged, Jaime and Steve are finally married. Cast: Farrah Forke (Kimberly Harmon), Anne Lockhart (Caroline MacNamara), Alan Sader (John MacNamara), Geordie Johnson (Miles Kendrick), Ivan Sergei (Astaad Rashid), Lee Majors II (Jim Castillian), Robert D. Raiford (Minister), James Shanta (Rock), Michael Hartson (Stone), Ann Pierce (Connie Havilland), Michael Camden Richards (NEC Technician), Shanghai Stafford (Marine Captain), General Fermon Judd, Jr. (Bahamas Policeman), Michael Burgess (Delta Commando), Steffen Foster (Reporter), Dave Thomas (Himself)

== See also ==
- List of The Six Million Dollar Man episodes
- Bionic Woman (2007 TV series)#Episodes
