= Robert Costanzo =

American film, television and voice actor (born 1942)

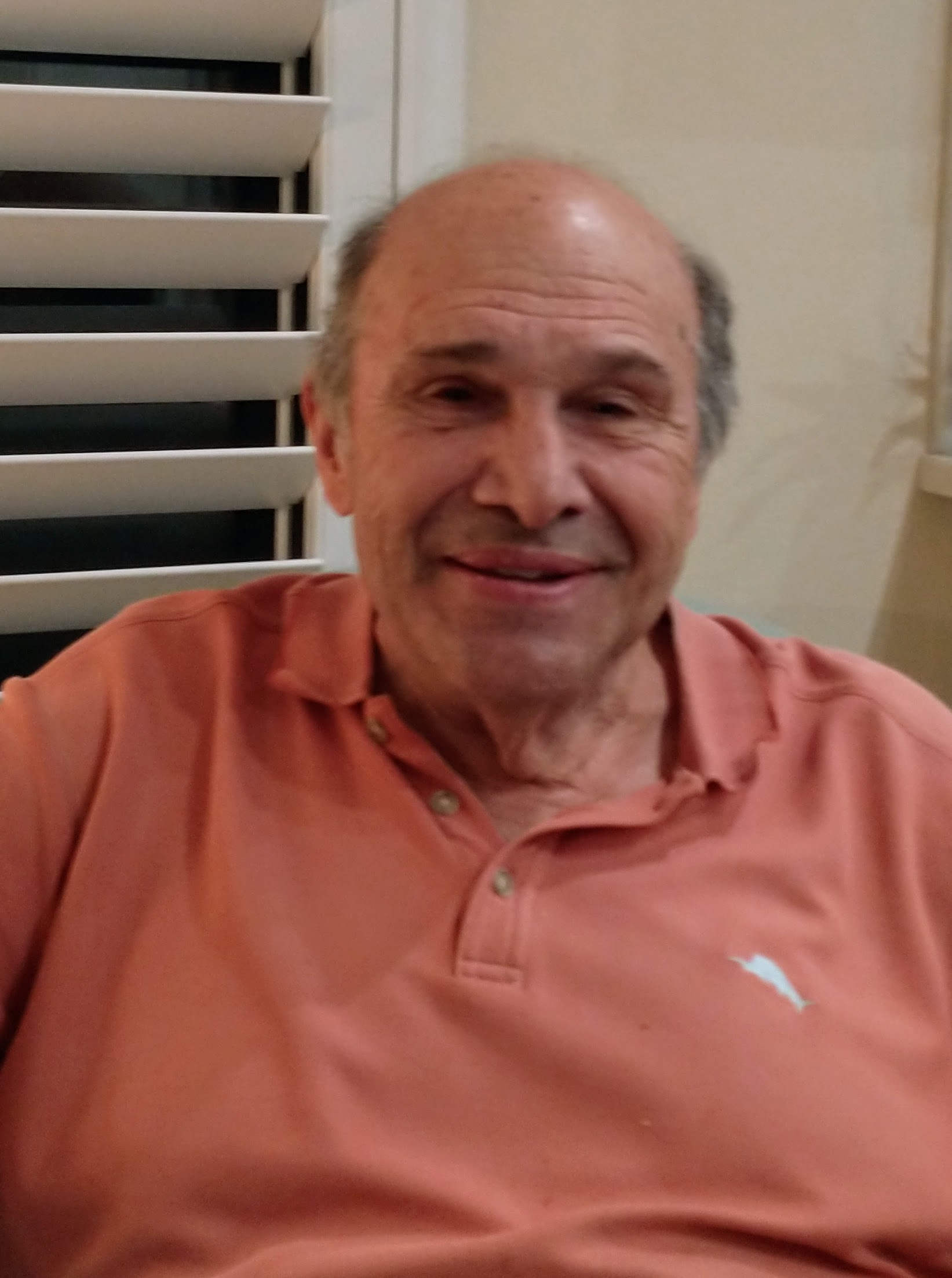
- Costanzo in 2021
- Born: Robert Jason Costanzo; October 20, 1942 (age 83); Brooklyn, New York, U.S.
- Occupation: Actor
- Years active: 1975–present

Robert Jason Costanzo (born October 20, 1942) is an American film, television and voice actor. A character actor with an acting career spanning over 40 years, he is often found playing surly New York City types on both sides of the law, and mixes both drama and comedy roles.

As a voice actor, he is perhaps best known as the voice of Harvey Bullock in the DC Animated Universe, and often serves as a voice double for Danny DeVito, most notably as Philoctetes in the 1998 Hercules animated series and the Kingdom Hearts video game series.

== Early life ==
Born in Brooklyn, New York, he is the son of actor Carmine Costanzo and is of Italian descent. He attended both the St. Francis Preparatory School and the St. Francis College.

== Career ==
Costanzo's first role was in the 1975 film Dog Day Afternoon playing a cop, although this was an uncredited part. This was followed by a role as a paint store customer in the 1977 film Saturday Night Fever. Other movie roles include Total Recall, Die Hard 2, Dick Tracy, City Slickers, and Down and Derby. His television appearances are varied, with him appearing in Lois & Clark, Boston Legal, Hannah Montana, Friends and Joey as the father of main character Joey Tribbiani, Days of Our Lives, The Golden Girls and numerous other series. He also starred as Commissioner Stenchler in the Sega CD game Sewer Shark.

Costanzo is also a voice actor and has done voices on shows including Hercules, The Fairly OddParents, The Zeta Project, House of Mouse, Duckman, Bonkers, and Random! Cartoons, among others. He also voiced Harvey Bullock in the DC Animated Universe, consisting of Batman: The Animated Series, Superman: The Animated Series, The New Batman Adventures and Static Shock, the theatrical release Mask of the Phantasm, and the video releases Batman & Mr. Freeze: SubZero and Mystery of the Batwoman. He voiced Angelo in The Sopranos: Road to Respect and Joe Barbaro and Derek Pappalardo in Mafia II.

Costanzo reprised his role as Bullock in the video game Batman: Arkham Origins.

== Filmography ==
=== Film ===
Year	Title	Role	Notes
1975	Dog Day Afternoon	New York Policeman	Uncredited
1977	Between the Lines	Austin's Men	
1977	The Goodbye Girl	Liquor Store Salesman	
1977	Saturday Night Fever	Paint Store Customer	
1978	Bloodbrothers	Vic	
1980	Fatso	Johnny	
1982	Shoot the Moon	Leo Spinelli	
1983	The Star Chamber	Sgt. Spota	
1983	Two of a Kind	Captain Cinzari	
1984	Up the Creek	Campus Guard Charlie	
1986	The Lightship	Stump	
1986	The Boss' Wife	Eddie	
1990	Total Recall	Agent Harry	
1990	Dick Tracy	Lips' Bodyguard	
1990	Die Hard 2	Sergeant Vito Lorenzo	
1990	Masters of Menace	Pilot	
1991	Delusion	Myron Sales	
1991	City Slickers	Sal	
1992	We're Talking Serious Money	Michael	
1992	Unlawful Entry	Bail Bondsman	
1992	Honeymoon in Vegas	Sidney Tomashefsky	
1993	The Cemetery Club	Morty	
1993	Relentless 3	Roy Kalewsky	Direct-to-video
1993	Man's Best Friend	Detective Kovacs	
1993	Batman: Mask of the Phantasm	Harvey Bullock (voice)	
1994	North	Al	
1995	Dream a Little Dream 2	Mr. McVie	Direct-to-video
1995	For Better or Worse	Ranzier	
1995	Forget Paris	Waiter	
1996	Underworld	Stan	
1997	Lunker Lake	'Weasel' Swindell	
1997	Wounded	Stu Sachen	
1998	Batman & Mr. Freeze: SubZero	Harvey Bullock (voice)	Direct-to-video
1998	Hoods	Mario	
1998	Air Bud: Golden Receiver	Coach Fanelli	
1998	With Friends Like These...	Johnny DiMartino	
1999	The 4th Floor	Exterminator	
1999	Do You Wanna Dance?	Father Chris Kerhulas	
2000	The Last Producer	Moogian	
2000	Wannabes	Mr. Letto	
2002	The Rose Technique	Vince Trane	Direct-to-video
2003	Carolina	Perfect Date Contestant	
2003	Alex & Emma	Bus Driver	
2003	Batman: Mystery of the Batwoman	Harvey Bullock (voice)	Direct-to-video
2005	Down and Derby	Claude	
2005	In the Mix	Tony 'Fat Tony'	
2007	Urban Decay	Fetz	
2008	The Flyboys	Carmine	
2008	The Big Shot-Caller	Rudy Lessor	
2010	Undisputed III: Redemption	Gio Farnatti	Direct-to-video
2011	Judy Moody and the Not Bummer Summer	Mr. Birnbaum	
2012	Foodfight!	Maximilius Moose (voice)	
2013	Once Upon a Time in Brooklyn	Lenny Leone	
2015	Last Days of Coney Island	Max (voice)	Short film
2016	Stevie D	Tony Muccerino	
2018	Frank and Ava	Willie	
2019	Beast Mode	Chrome Mangle	
2019	El Coyote	Giovanni Fransesco	
2020	Snowbird	Bud	Short film
2021	Dutch	Tony 'Fat Tony' Cerone	
2022	Respect the Jux	Porn King	

=== Television ===
Year	Title	Role	Notes
1977–1982	Barney Miller	Bill Kerlin, Ed Foronjy, Vincent Thorndyke	3 episodes
1978	Rhoda	Male Student	Episode: "Rhoda Cheats"
1978	The Bob Newhart Show	Sal Petrone	Episode: "Crisis in Education"
1978	Baretta	Kresler	Episode: "Woman Trouble"
1978–1979	Joe & Valerie	Vincent Pizo	6 episodes
1978–1983	Alice	Lenny, Male Customer	3 episodes
1979	Lou Grant	Tannenberg	Episode: "Romance"
1979–1980	The Last Resort	Murray	15 episodes
1979–1981	The White Shadow	Mr. Pettrino	4 episodes
1981	Soap	Carny	1 episode
1981	Charlie's Angels	Mac Gossett	Episode: "Taxi Angels"
1981	Checking In	Hank Sabatino	4 episodes
1982	Million Dollar Infield	Artie Levitas	Television film
1982	It's a Living	Vinnie 'The Hat'	Episode: "Horsing Around"
1982	Police Squad!	Leo	Episode: "Rendezvous at Big Gulch (Terror in the Neighborhood)"
1982–1986	Cagney & Lacey	Scafali, Monk	2 episodes
1982–1988	St. Elsewhere	Mr. Broadwater	3 episodes
1983	Gimme a Break!	Mr. Brandt	Episode: "Glenlawn Street Blues"
1983	Blood Feud	Rocky	Television film
1983	We Got It Made	Mike	Episode: "David's Birthday"
1984	The New Mike Hammer	Ari Artel	Episode: "Seven Dead Eyes"
1984	Hill Street Blues	Lester Franco	3 episodes
1984	Hunter	Benny	Episode: "Flight on a Dead Pigeon"
1984	Mama Malone	Albert	Episode: "Father Romeo"
1984	Who's the Boss?	Robaire	Episode: "Dinner for Two"
1984	The Vegas Strip War	Stan Markham	Television film
1984–1987	Family Ties	Various	5 episodes
1984	The Ratings Game	Nunzio	Television film
1985	The Fall Guy	Duke	Episode: "Split Image"
1985	Street Hawk	Phil Simkins	Episode: "Follow the Yellow Gold Road"
1985	The Twilight Zone	Joe Rubello	Episode: "Healer"
1985	Stir Crazy	Coach Lou Paterno	Episode: "The Football Story"
1986	ALF	Bert	Episode: "Baby, You Can Drive My Car"
1986	You Again?	Cop	Episode: "Good Neighbors"
1986–1987	L.A. Law	Vinnie La Rosa	3 episodes
1986–1995	Murder, She Wrote	Lieutenant Greco, Freddie, Rudlfo Petrocelli	3 episodes
1987	Charles in Charge	Hank Holloway	Episode: "Feud for Thought"
1987	She's the Sheriff	Frankie Fontaine	Episode: "Monkey Business"
1987	Night Court	Santa	Episode: "Let It Snow"
1988	Tales from the Darkside	Vincent Dessari	Episode: "The Deal"
1988	Duet	Marty	Episode: "No Reservations"
1988	The Law & Harry McGraw	Roscoe	Episode: "Waiting Game"
1988	The Secret Life of Kathy McCormick	Sid	Television film
1988	Annie McGuire	Officer Murphy	Episode: "The Hold-Up"
1988	Day by Day	Max	Episode: "Won't You Be My Neighbor?"
1989	Columbo	Sergeant Russo	Episode: "Columbo Goes to the Guillotine"
1989	Quantum Leap	Chuck Thompson	Episode: "Camikazi Kid - June 6, 1961"
1989	Star Trek: The Next Generation	Slade Bender	Episode: "Manhunt"
1989–1990	The Tracey Ullman Show	Tony 'Big Tony' Manetti	2 episodes
1990	Glory Days	Lieutenant V.T. Krantz	6 episodes
1990	The Golden Girls	Coach Odlivak	Episode: "Feelings"
1990	Uncle Buck	Bernie	Episode: "Fire Sale"
1991	Sisters	Sidney Getz	Episode: "80%"
1991	Sibs	Leo	Episode: "Audie's Bad Day"
1991	Growing Pains	Ernie	Episode: "The Young and the Homeless"
1992	Maid for Each Other	Lieutenant Jardine	Television film
1992	On the Air	Plumber	1 episode
1992	Brooklyn Bridge	Mr. Cavaretti	2 episodes
1992	Jack's Place	Moe Jablonski	Episode: "Forever"
1992	Bodies of Evidence	Detective Alfie	Episode: "The Cold Light of Day"
1992	Beverly Hills, 90210	Clarence the Angel (voice)	Episode: "It's a Totally Happening Life"
1992	Civil Wars	DeRubumpre	Episode: "A Partridge in a Pair's Tree"
1992–1995	Batman: The Animated Series	Harvey Bullock (voice)	21 episodes
1993	Doogie Howser, M.D.	Mr. Healy	Episode: "Eleven Angry People... and Vinnie"
1993	Almost Home	Bob 'Big Bob' Petrelli	Episode: "Bowling for Daddies"
1993	Bonkers	Crunchy Potato Chip (voice)	Episode: "Springtime for the Iguana"
1993	NYPD Blue	Alfonse Giardella	6 episodes
1993	The Mommies	Santa #2	Episode: "Christmas"
1993	Empty Nest	Millard	Episode: "Read All About It"
1994	Diagnosis: Murder	Bobby Rebetta	Episode: "Shaker"
1994	The Fresh Prince of Bel-Air	Duke	Episode: "The Philadelphia Story"
1994–1995	Lois & Clark: The New Adventures of Superman	Louie, Gun Shop Owner	2 episodes
1995	Santo Bugito	Fingers (voice)	Episode: "Load 'O Bees"
1995	Friends	Joey Tribbiani Sr.	Episode: "The One with the Boobies"
1995	Platypus Man	Sal	Episode: "Lou's the Boss"
1995–1996	Charlie Grace	Artie Crawford	9 episodes
1996	Duckman	Additional voices	Episode: "A Room with a Bellevue"
1996	Mad About You	Door Guy	Episode: "Hot & Cold"
1996	Partners	Max Lobster	Episode: "You Quit?"
1996	Townies	Mr. Rosano	Episode: "The Life of Ryan"
1997	Superman: The Animated Series	Detective Harvey Bullock (voice)	Episode: "World's Finest"
1997	Kenan & Kel	Mr. Maniaci	Episode: "Safe and Sorry"
1997	Murphy Brown	Dry Cleaner	Episode: "Oh, Danny Boy"
1997	The Nanny	Juror #4	Episode: "Samson, He Denied Her"
1997	Party of Five	Arnie Horn	Episode: "Hitting Bottom"
1997	Caroline in the City	Tony	Episode: "Caroline and the Ombudsman"
1997	Rugrats	Vinnie (voice)	Episode: "Looking for Jack"
1997	Teen Angel	Uncle Lou	Episode: "Steve & Marty & Jordan & Uncle Lou"
1997–1998	The New Batman Adventures	Detective Harvey Bullock (voice)	8 episodes
1998	Police Academy	Marcus Erroneous	Episode: "Angel on My Back"
1998	The Tony Danza Show	Charlie Falcone	Episode: "C'gar Face"
1998	Early Edition	Sal	Episode: "Blackout"
1998	The Magical World of Walt Disney	Philoctetes (voice)	Recurring role
1998–1999	Hercules	Philoctetes (voice)	29 episodes
1999	DiResta	Vic DiResta	5 episodes
1999	Ally McBeal	George Chisholm	Episode: "Civil War"
1999	Todd McFarlane's Spawn	Mr. Orvetti (voice)	Episode: "The Mindkiller"
1999	Cousin Skeeter	Mr. Schinkenslayer	Episode: "Two Men and a Baby Pig"
2000	G vs E	Dino Corfu	Episode: "Wonderful Life"
2000	Falcone	Jackie Savino	Episode: "Lealta"
2000	Bull	Pete	Episode: "To Have and to Hold"
2000	Norm	Tony DiBenedetto	Episode: "Norm vs. the Sacrifice"
2000–2006	Family Guy	Biff, Louie Anderson, Danny DeVito (voice)	2 episodes
2001	Kate Brasher	Larry	Episode: "Kate"
2001	61*	'Toots' Shor	Television film
2001	Going to California	Al Weeks	Episode: "Hurricane Al: A Tale of Key Largo"
2001	Providence	Carlo	Episode: "Best Man"
2001	Call Me Claus	Teamster Santa	Television film
2001–2003	The Fairly OddParents	Easter Bunny, Construction Worker Ape, Ape Truck Driver (voice)	2 episodes
2002	As Told by Ginger	Chef Bob (voice)	Episode: "Fast Reputation"
2002	The Zeta Project	Titus Sweete (voice)	2 episodes
2002	House of Mouse	Philoctetes (voice)	Episode: "Donald Wants to Fly"
2002	Bram & Alice	Buddy Royal	Episode: "Paul-Pot"
2003	Static Shock	Detective Harvey Bullock (voice)	Episode: "Hard as Nails"
2003	ER	Pernicious Anemia Man	Episode: "No Strings Attached"
2004	Rock Me Baby	Franco	Episode: "Look Who's Talking"
2004	Helter Skelter	Leno LaBianca	Television film
2004	NCIS	Jimmy 'Naps' Napolitano	Episode: "The Boneyard"
2004	Will & Grace	Paul	2 episodes
2005	CSI: NY	Frank Meadows	Episode: "Recycling"
2005	Mind of Mencia	Italian Man	1 episode
2005	The Young and the Restless	Hotel Desk Clerk	1 episode
2006	Joey	Joey Tribbiani Sr.	Episode: "Joey and the Dad"
2006–2010	Days of Our Lives	Sal Bandino, Motel Clerk	8 episodes
2007	Dirt	Tony	Episode: "The Thing Under the Bed"
2007	Boston Legal	Wayne Picker	Episode: "Duck and Cover"
2007–2010	Hannah Montana	Al Blaine, Jersey Guy	2 episodes
2008	The Spectacular Spider-Man	Sullivan Edwards (voice)	Episode: "Intervention"
2009	Random! Cartoons	Bossman (voice)	Episode: "Flavio"
2009	Reno 911!	Don Bronzoni	Episode: "Dangle's Murder Mystery"
2009	Castle	Sal Tenor	Episode: "A Death in the Family"
2013	Kickin' It	Harvey	Episode: "Queen of Karts"
2015	About a Boy	Dennis, The Deceiver	Episode: "About a Babymoon"
2016	2 Broke Girls	Luigi	Episode: "And the Show and Don't Tell"
2016	Modern Family	Earl Chambers	Episode: "Halloween IV: Revenge of Rod Skyhook"
2017	9JKL	Massimo	Episode: "High Steaks"
2018	OK K.O.! Let's Be Heroes	Big Cheese (voice)	Episode: "Action News"
2018	Champions	Uncle Bud	8 episodes
2019	9-1-1	Jack Kramer	Episode: "Kids Today"
2020	Just Roll with It	Joey 'Coconuts'	Episode: "The Great Coconuts Caper"
2021	El Coyote the Prequel	Bobby	Episode: "Witness Protection"
2021	Tacoma FD	Enzo	Episode: "Pickleball"
2024	Tulsa King	Ernie Anastasio	Episode: "Life Support"

=== Video games ===
Year	Title	Role
1992	Sewer Shark	Stenchler
1994	The Adventures of Batman & Robin	Harvey Bullock
2002	Kingdom Hearts	Philoctetes
2005	Kingdom Hearts II	Philoctetes
2006	The Sopranos: Road to Respect	Angelo
2010	Kingdom Hearts Birth by Sleep	Philoctetes
2010	Command & Conquer 4: Tiberian Twilight	Additional voices
2010	Mafia II	Joe Barbaro, Derek Pappalardo
2013	Batman: Arkham Origins	Harvey Bullock
2018	Thief of Thieves	Geoffredo Rotolo
