= Ken Michelman =

American actor (born 1955)

- Born: May 23, 1955 (age 70); New York City, New York, U.S.
- Occupation(s): Television, film actor

Ken Michelman (born May 23, 1955) is an American actor primarily known for his role as Abner Goldstein on the TV series The White Shadow. He also played Gary Greenberg, Cindy Brady's love interest on the short-lived Brady Bunch spin-off, The Bradys. He also appeared on Grey's Anatomy.

Michelman played basketball at the University of Denver on the same mid 1970s team with David Adkins who would later become the comedian Sinbad. After injuring his ankle, he transferred to Skidmore College.

Michelman lives in Sherman Oaks, California, making occasional acting appearances.

== Filmography ==
Film and Television
Year	Title	Role	Notes
1978	M*A*S*H	Harker	Episode: "Your Hit Parade"
1978–1981	The White Shadow	Abner Goldstein	Main role (40 episodes)
1980	Getting Wasted	Al	Feature film
1981	The Waltons	Corp. Bergstrom	Episode: "The Pursuit"
1981	Angel Dusted	Mark Eaton	TV film
1982	Police Squad!	Kingsley	Episode: "The Butler Did It (A Bird in the Hand)"
1982	Hart to Hart	Wayne Tucker	Episode: "A Christmas Hart"
1985	Means and Ends	Paul	Feature film
1986	Spiker	Steve Landow	Feature film
1989	Thirtysomething	Brock	Episode: "Courting Nancy"
1990	The Bradys	Gary Greenberg	Recurring role (4 episodes)
1991	Matlock	Sidney Falco	Episode: "The Critic"
1997	Vegas Vacation	Pick a Number Dealer	Feature film
1998	Cab to Canada	Real Estate Agent	TV movie
1999	Introducing Dorothy Dandridge	Byron Haskin	TV movie
2000	The Independent	Prosecutor	Feature film
2004	Girlfriends	Edward	Episode: "A Comedy of Eros"
2005	Jane Doe: Now You See It, Now You Don't	Norman Perkins	TV movie
2005	Dirty Deeds	Bartender	Feature film
2005	Sleeper Cell	Gary (FBI General Counsel)	Episode: "Money"
2005	The West Wing	Ted Zukoski	Episode: "Message of the Week"
2006	The West Wing	Ted Zukoski	Episode: "Two Weeks Out"
2006	Without a Trace	Mark Norton	Episode: "All for One"
2007	Shark	1st Juror	Episode: "Porn Free"
2008	Butterfly Dreaming	Officer Gearty	Feature film
2013	Grey's Anatomy	Dr. Goyle	Episode: "Can't Fight This Feeling"
