= The Big Shot-Caller =

- Directed by: Marlene Rhein
- Written by: Marlene Rhein
- Produced by: Christine Giorgio; Erika Yeomans
- Starring: David Rhein; Marlene Rhein; Robert Costanzo
- Cinematography: Paolo Cascio
- Edited by: Christine Giorgio
- Music by: Justin Asher
- Production company: Stella Films
- Release dates: February 28, 2008 (Sedona Film Festival); May 15, 2009 (New York)
- Running time: 90 minutes
- Country: United States
- Language: English
- Budget: $350,000 USD

The Big Shot-Caller is a 2008 independent dramedy film. Marlene Rhein wrote, directed and co-starred in the film. Rhein wrote the film, inspired by her brother, David, who has Aniridia with Pathologic nystagmus, but overcame the obstacle and became a competitive Salsa dancer. The brother and sister starred in the film together.

== Director ==
Marlene Rhein spent 15 years as a music video director. She directed over 40 videos including "It's All About You" for Tupac Shakur and "Fuck Me Pumps" for Amy Winehouse. Rhein was one of Filmmaker Magazine's 25 New Faces of Independent Film in 2000. She is from Mount Sinai, New York and graduated from Ithaca College.

== Cast ==
- David Rhein as Jamie Lessor
- Marlene Rhein as Lianne Lessor
- Robert Costanzo as Rudy Lessor
- Laneya Wiles as Elissa
- Leslie Eva Glaser as Rebecca
- Julie Marcus as Real Estate Broker

== Plot ==
Jamie Lessor's life is a bit out of focus. His childhood dream was to be a Salsa dancer, but his rare eye condition made that dream seem impossible. His best friend and big sister, Lianne, ran away from home when he was a boy and left him to be raised by his grumpy poker-playing father. Working as a shy, friendless accountant in Manhattan, Jamie is beginning to wonder if true happiness is out of his reach. That is, until he meets Elissa who brings him to life. Blinded by love, he can't see that it's a mismatch from the start. When she suddenly stops communicating with him, Jamie finds himself heartbroken and alone again. After ten years of separation, he reluctantly calls Lianne for advice. But Lianne has her own problems and reminds Jamie that, in life, "God is the big shot-caller" and maybe God is trying to tell Jamie to love himself first. Lianne pushes Jamie to come to terms with his fears and to begin the search for himself. He ultimately finds himself, and love, on the dance floor.

== Filming ==
Filming took place in Manhattan, New York in the United States.

The final scene was filmed at Club Shalom in Cali, Colombia, in order to shoot the ending with Rhein's grandfather, a holocaust survivor, who moved his family to Colombia after the war and was still living there at the time of the film shoot.

The film was shot in 2007.

== Soundtrack ==
The soundtrack features music by the Salsa group, La Excelencia.

== Film Festivals ==
The film was an official selection in several film festivals throughout 2008 and 2009:

- Acefest Film Festival
- New York International Latino Film Festival
- Sedona Film Festival
- Bermuda International Film Festival
- Hamptons Black International Film Festival
- Feel Good Film Festival

== Reception ==
11 critics reviewed the film on Rotten Tomatoes and gave it an 18% favorability rating. In contrast, nearly 5,500 moviegoers on Rotten Tomatoes gave the film a favorability rating of 53%.
