= Colette Dowling =

American writer

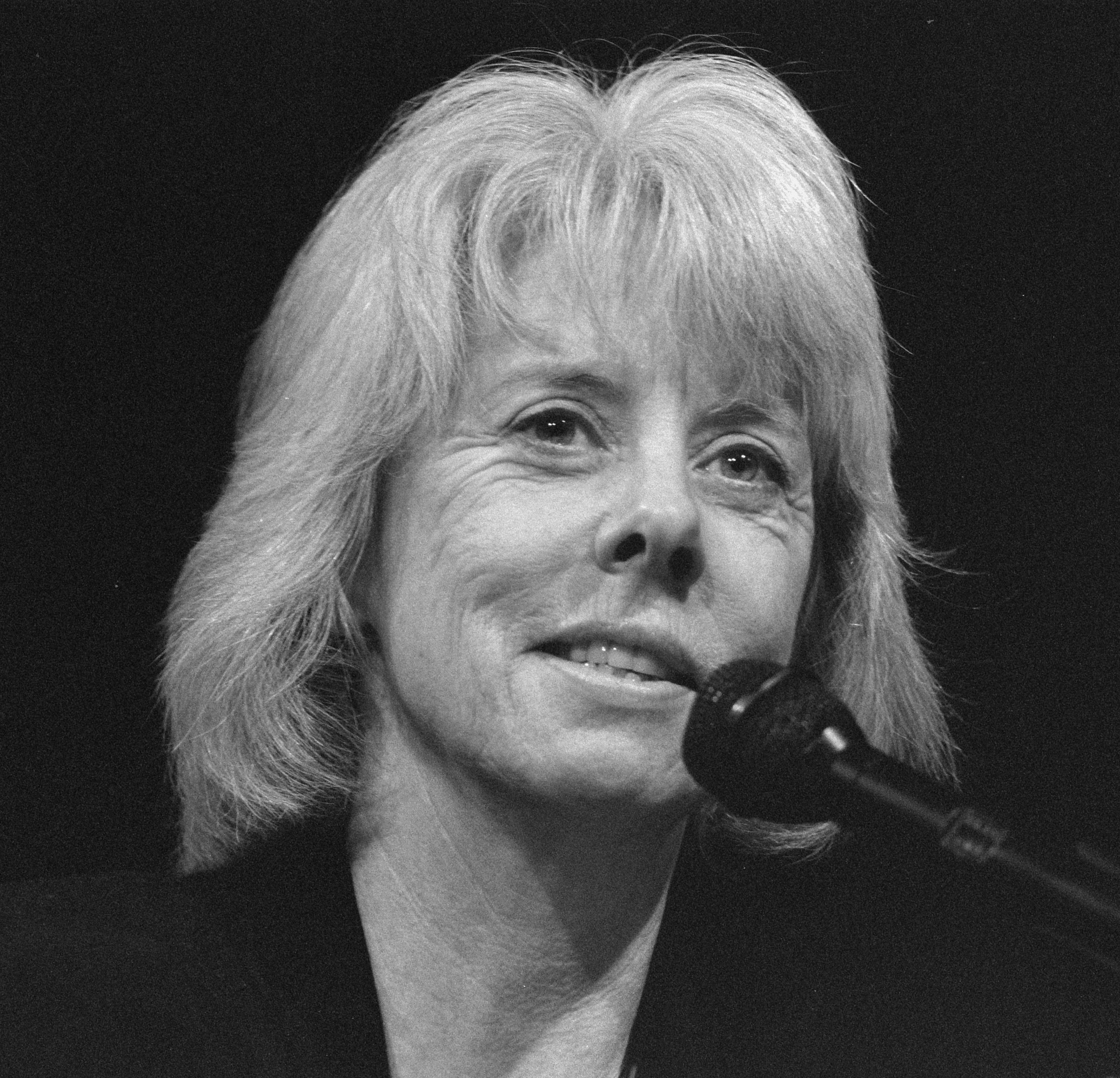
Colette Dowling in 1989

Colette Dowling (born c. 1938) is an American writer best known for her 1981 book The Cinderella Complex: Women's Hidden Fear of Independence, which was a New York Times best-seller. She has a psychotherapy practice in New York.

== Bibliography ==
- The Skin Game, 1971
- How to Love a Member of the Opposite Sex: a Memoir, 1976
- The Cinderella Complex: Women's Hidden Fear of Independence, 1981
- Perfect Women: Hidden Fears of Inadequacy and the Drive to Perform, 1988
- You Mean I Don't Have to Feel This Way?: New Help for Depression, Anxiety, and Addiction, 1991
- Red Hot Mamas: Coming Into Our Own at Fifty, 1996
- Maxing Out: Why Women Sabotage their Financial Security, 1998
- The Frailty Myth: Women Approaching Physical Equality, 2000

== Personal life ==
Colette Dowling was raised in Baltimore and got a BA from Trinity College in Washington, D.C., 1958. Dowling has published eight books, including The Cinderella Complex, an international best-seller translated into 23 languages. She has written essays and articles for The New York Times Magazine, New York, Harpers, and Esquire.

In 2004, Dowling graduated with a master's degree in clinical social work from The Smith College School for Social Work. Following that, she entered training in psychoanalysis at the Institute for Contemporary Psychotherapy in New York, receiving her certificate in psychoanalysis in 2009. She works as a psychotherapist in private practice in Manhattan, and continues to write. Her office is in the Flatiron district.
