= Lovelines (film) =

1984 American film by Rod Amateau

- Theatrical release poster
- Directed by: Rod Amateau
- Screenplay by: Chip Hand; William Byron Hillman
- Story by: Chip Hand; Michael Lloyd; William Byron Hillman
- Produced by: Michael Lloyd; Hal Taines
- Starring: Greg Bradford; Mary Beth Evans; Michael Winslow; Don Michael Paul; Tammy Taylor
- Cinematography: Duke Callaghan
- Edited by: David Bretherton; Fred A. Chulack
- Production company: Delphi II Productions
- Distributed by: Tri-Star Pictures
- Release date: November 2, 1984
- Running time: 93 minutes
- Country: United States
- Language: English

Lovelines is a 1984 American comedy film directed by Rod Amateau and written by Chip Hand and William Byron Hillman. The film stars Greg Bradford, Mary Beth Evans, Michael Winslow, Don Michael Paul and Tammy Taylor. The film was released on November 2, 1984 by Tri-Star Pictures.

== Plot ==
The annual battle of the bands is raging. Two rival high schools, Malibu High School and Coldwater Canyon High, have two hot bands; The Firecats and Racer. When the lead singers of both bands, Piper (Mary Beth Evans) and Rick (Greg Bradford), meet, they fall in love with each other and have to fight realities such as peer pressure, the fact they attend rival high schools and even Piper's older brother, Godzilla (Frank Zagarino), try to stop their love from getting stronger. The telephone service called Lovelines, run by J.D. Prescott (Michael Winslow), is right in the middle to help the two stay in love with each other and is also sponsoring the annual battle of the bands where their bands are competing with each other. It all comes down to a masquerade party where everyone from both schools learn that true love does indeed conquer all.

== Cast ==
- Greg Bradford as Rick Johnson
- Mary Beth Evans as Piper
- Michael Winslow as J.D.
- Don Michael Paul as Jeff
- Tammy Taylor as Priscilla
- Stacey Toten as Cynthia
- Robert DeLapp as The Beagle
- Frank Zagarino as Godzilla
- Todd Bryant as Hammer
- Jonna Lee as Lisa
- Robin Watkins as Theresa
- Claudia Cowan as Brigit
- Lynn Cartwright as Mrs. Woodson
- Albert Szabo as Professor Fromawitz
- David Jolliffe as Tongue
- Miguel Ferrer as Dragon
- Sherri Stoner as Suzy
- Sarah G. Buxton as Cathy
- Joyce Jameson as Mary Asquith
- Shecky Greene as Master of Ceremonies
- Gary Morgan as Cafeteria Attendant
- Marguerite Kimberley as Bathtub Girl
- Kelley Jean Browser as The Ventriloquist
- Michael Lloyd as Lloyd Sidewalk
- Paul Valentine as Mr. Van Der Meer
- Conrad E. Palmisano as Motorcycle Officer #1
- Robert Fiacco as Motorcycle Officer #2
- James Trenton as Disk Jockey
- Ernest Robinson as Porno Spectator
- Aimée Eccles as Nisei
