= Revenge and Remorse (The Guilty Alibi) =

- Police Squad! episode
- Frank and Ed having lunch
- Episode no.: Season 1 Episode 4
- Directed by: Paul Krasny
- Written by: Nancy Steen: Neil Thompson
- Original air date: March 25, 1982

Guest appearances
- William Shatner (special guest star); Joyce Brothers as herself; Spencer Milligan as Eddie Casales; Bonnie Campbell-Britton as Lana Casales; K. T. O'Sullivan as Mimi Du Jour

Episode chronology
← Previous "Rendezvous at Big Gulch (Terror in the Neighborhood)"	Next → "The Butler Did It (A Bird in the Hand)"

"Revenge and Remorse (The Guilty Alibi)" is the fourth episode of the television series Police Squad!. It was directed by Paul Krasny, written by Nancy Steen and Neil Thompson, and produced by Robert K. Weiss.

== Plot ==
At night, someone enters a courthouse and replaces Judge J. Oliver Maxwell's gavel. The next day, the gavel explodes when Maxwell uses it, killing him.

Captain Ed Hocken tells Lieutenant Frank Drebin that he suspects a revenge killing by a criminal Maxwell sent to prison. The prime suspect is Eddie Casales, a bomber who was recently released. Ed and Frank question Eddie's ex-wife, Lana Casales. She hasn't spoken to Eddie since their divorce, but she points them to Club Flamingo and chorus girl Mimi Du Jour. Frank and Ed question Du Jour at Club Flamingo. She claims she and Eddie were at the movies during the bombing. When Eddie arrives during the interview, he corroborates that; but after Frank and Ed leave, Du Jour confirms she said what Eddie told her to.

The next afternoon, lab technician Ted Olson reports that the courthouse bomb was a crude combination of household chemicals, not the work of a professional.

The bomber tampers with a car. The next morning, the vehicle explodes when a man starts the ignition.

=== Act II: Richard III ===
Act II: Richard III

Frank, Ed, and Officer Norberg inspect the explosion site. The victim was John Symington, the former assistant district attorney who prosecuted Eddie. They find a matchbox from Club Flamingo, so they question Eddie but can't prove anything. Du Jour confesses to Frank that Eddie's alibi was false, and she doesn't know where he really was. She also mentions that it was Eddie who initiated the divorce.

Believing Lana could be the next target, Frank offers her police protection; but she declines because she is leaving town. Frank and Ed stake out Mimi's house, hoping to catch the bomber coming for her, only for Lana herself to be revealed as the culprit. Her attempt to blow up the neighborhood fails when Eddie dismantles the bomb, and Lana is arrested.

=== Epilogue ===
Frank tells Ed that Eddie was actually attending a Milwaukee Brewers game during the courthouse bombing; Eddie lied because he had crossed state lines in violation of his parole. They agree to let Eddie off.

== Recurring jokes ==
- Tonight's special guest star: William Shatner. As the opening credits roll, Shatner is seen seated at a restaurant table when machine gun fire suddenly begins to riddle the area around him. Shatner pulls out a gun and fires back, killing his attacker. He then sips some wine but begins gagging and choking, and collapses while pointing to his dining companion.
- Next week's experiment: "...I'll show you why women can't play professional football."
- Johnny's next customer: Dr. Joyce Brothers, asking about the Cinderella complex.
- Freeze frame gag: Norberg comes in to ask Ed about some files. He notices the freeze frame and tries to find a good pose.

== Notes ==
- This is the second Police Squad! episode to refer to On the Waterfront, after Ring of Fear (A Dangerous Assignment).
- Joyce Brothers later appears in a cameo (again as herself) in the first Naked Gun film.
