= Quigley (film) =

2003 American Christian comedy film by William Byron Hillman

- Promotional release poster
- Directed by: William Byron Hillman
- Written by: William Byron Hillman
- Produced by: William Byron Hillman; Russ Kavanaugh; Jerry Rose; Sally Stringer
- Starring: Gary Busey; Oz Perkins; Curtis Armstrong
- Cinematography: Gary Graver
- Edited by: Christopher Nelson
- Music by: Mike DeMartino; Erik Lundmark
- Release date: September 24, 2003
- Running time: 89 minutes
- Country: United States
- Language: English

Quigley (released in the United Kingdom as Daddy Dog Day) is a 2003 American Christian comedy film written, directed and co-produced by William Byron Hillman. It stars Gary Busey, Curtis Armstrong, and Oz Perkins, and was released direct-to-video.

== Premise ==
Archie Channing (Gary Busey), the jaded billionaire CEO of a technology corporation, dies in a car accident. To atone for his sins, God has Archie return to Earth in the form of a white Pomeranian named Quigley.

== Cast ==
- Gary Busey as Archie Channing
- Oz Perkins as Guardian Angel Sweeney
- Curtis Armstrong as Dexter Pearlsley
- Caryn Greenhut as Sarah
- Christopher Atkins as Woodward Channing
- Jessica Ferrarone as Joanne Channing
- Jillian Clare as Megan Channing
- Galvin Chapman as Brian Channing (as Galvin T. Chapman)
- Bill Fagerbakke as Security Guard Londo
- Dorien Wilson as Security Guard Pressle
- P. J. Ochlan as Frank the Janitor
- Kieran Mulroney as Dog Catcher Wally Sprigs

== Production ==
The film was shot primarily in Los Angeles, with many scenes taking filmed at the Tillman Water Reclamation Plant and the Japanese Garden in Van Nuys. In an interview with The A.V. Club in 2012, Curtis Armstrong recalled an incident where Gary Busey disliked the set of heaven since it did not look like the heaven that he saw when he had a near-death experience. Busey also fought with another actor about what heaven really looked like.

== Critical reception ==
JoBlo.com wrote a positive review for the film, commenting that it was "awfully good" and that while it qualified as a bad movie, this made it enjoyable. Rob Gonsalves of eFilmCritic.com panned Quigley, writing, "Absolutely none of this is interesting or entertaining, not even on the level of 'I am actually watching a pomeranian who's supposed to be Gary Busey.'"

The Dove Foundation's review was mostly positive, writing that the "story tempo is somewhat inconsistent, and some scenery and characters are less than believable" but that it was also "loaded with slapstick and silly characters chasing and being chased, mixed with prat falls and double takes."

=== Awards ===
- Young Artist Award for Best Performance in a Feature Film — Young Actress Age Ten or Younger (2004, nominated — Jillian Clare)
