= The Butler Did It (A Bird in the Hand) =

- Police Squad! episode
- Frank and Ed shooting at the kidnapper in front of the El Tubadera club
- Episode no.: Season 1 Episode 5
- Directed by: Georg Stanford Brown
- Story by: Deborah Hwang-Marriott, Robert K. Weiss
- Teleplay by: Pat Proft
- Original air date: March 18, 1982

Guest appearances
- Robert Goulet (special guest star); Tommy Lasorda as Himself; Nicolas Coster as Warner Burton; Lilibet Stern as Terri Burton; Byron Webster as Thames; Ken Michelman as Kingsley Addison; Peter Elbing as The Mime; K Callan as Charlotte

Episode chronology
← Previous "Revenge and Remorse (The Guilty Alibi)"	Next → "Testimony of Evil (Dead Men Don't Laugh)"

"The Butler Did It (A Bird in the Hand)" is the fifth produced (but third broadcast) episode of the TV series Police Squad! It was written by Pat Proft and directed by Georg Stanford Brown. It was produced by Robert K. Weiss. It aired March 18, 1982.

== Plot ==
The episode opens with a birthday party organized by Mr. Burton for his daughter, Terri, who has turned 18. After Terri blows out the candles on her birthday cake, her boyfriend Kingsley Addison approaches her to discuss marriage. During their conversation, a man suddenly appears, takes hold of Terri, and incapacitates Kingsley.

Later at the crime scene, Frank and Ed talk about a ransom note left behind demanding $1 million. When Frank and Ed are questioning Mr. and Mrs. Burton, the kidnapper phones them. Frank orders Norberg to get a tap on the phone, only this doesn't work in time.

The next day, Frank decides to talk to Kingsley, the only witness to the kidnapping. Kingsley plays basketball every day at the Shorewood High school playground. While joining Kingsley's basketball game there, Frank discovers that he owed money to a lot of people. When Frank leaves, he receives a phone call from Ed saying that the kidnapper(s) have sent the Burtons a tape in the mail. When Frank, Ed and Norberg listen to the tape, they hear some strange noises in the background. When Ed complains that instructions for the delivery were not included, a mime appears to deliver these vital details.

=== Act Two: Ball III ===
Act Two: Ball III

Frank decides to go to the lab and see what Ted has come up with. Ted shows Frank that the noises on the tape are a bell and a foghorn, the kind of type you would associate with the ocean, or the lakefront. When Frank and Ed drive around for a couple of hours, they end up at a gas station, where they discover that the foghorn is actually a tuba, and the bell is the bell from the gas station. After Frank and Ed have checked almost every tuba store in the city, they hit a dead end. Frank decides to go to his own private source, Johnny, who tells Frank that a new store called the El Tubadera Club has just been opened.

When Frank gets there, he encounters the kidnapper coming out holding Terri Burton, which starts a gunfight. Ed comes by, and trying to get behind the kidnapper, he yells, "Cover me!" and Frank covers him with a blanket. Blinded, Ed stumbles around until he trips over a couple of trash cans. When the kidnapper tries to run once he's out of bullets, he trips over Ed, and Frank arrests him. Frank takes off the kidnapper's mask and reveals him as the Burtons' butler.

== Recurring jokes ==
- Tonight's special guest star: Robert Goulet, who is shot by firing squad. Goulet would later appear in The Naked Gun 2½ as the main antagonist Quentin Hapsburg.
- Next week's experiment: Ten things you can do with a carrot.
- Johnny's next customer: Tommy Lasorda, who wants to know if he needs another pitcher on his team; Johnny chides him for giving up Tommy John.
- Freeze frame gag: The chimpanzee in the office throws papers all over the office.
