= Rendezvous at Big Gulch (Terror in the Neighborhood) =

- Police Squad! episode
- Frank inside the keystore
- Episode no.: Season 1 Episode 3
- Directed by: Reza Badiyi
- Story by: Pat Proft
- Teleplay by: Nancy Steen: Neil Thompson
- Original air date: July 1, 1982

Guest appearances
- Florence Henderson (special guest star); Al Ruscio as Dutch Gunderson; Robert Costanzo as Leo; John Ashton as Rocky; Connie Needham as Jill; Rebecca Holden as Stella

Episode chronology
← Previous "Ring of Fear (A Dangerous Assignment)"	Next → "Revenge and Remorse (The Guilty Alibi)"

"Rendezvous at Big Gulch (Terror in the Neighborhood)" is the third produced (but fifth broadcast) episode of the short-lived TV series Police Squad!. The episode was directed by Reza Badiyi and written by Nancy Steen and Neil Thompson. As usual, the episode was produced by Robert K. Weiss.

== Plot ==
Two gangsters, Rocky and Leo, collect protection money from several local shops. A ballet teacher, Jill, cannot pay because of bad business and is beaten. Frank Drebin, the detective, interviews Jill, but she is reluctant to cooperate, claiming she did not get a good look.

Wanting to catch the gangsters in the act, Frank opens up a locksmith store along with fellow detective Norberg. Rocky and Leo's offer of protection is turned down. They assault the store with machine guns and then with a note tied to a rock tossed through the window. Analysis of the note and the rock in the Police Squad's lab reveals nothing.

Rocky and Leo try to intimidate Frank and Norberg again, but are beaten and left dazed on the street, to the cheers of the entire neighborhood. After Frank's victory, Leo and Rocky are seen talking with their boss Dutch Genderson, who wants Frank liquidated for causing trouble for his business.

=== Act II: Gesundheit ===
Act II: Gesundheit

Sometime later, a beautiful woman called Stella comes into the shop. Stella suggestively invites Frank to a clandestine meeting with her in her apartment, passing him one of the keys she has ordered. Two weeks later, when Frank tries to open the door with his key, Stella starts shooting through the door in an attempt to pass it off as an act of defense against a burglar. Frank, however, isn't behind the door, and arrests Stella. The phone rings; the person calling is Dutch Genderson, proving that the invitation was a setup to get Frank eliminated.

After the call, Frank detains Stella for attempted murder, and before meeting Dutch, Frank consults Johnny the shoe shiner and police informant. Johnny gives Frank some photostats that implicate Dutch. When Frank arrives at Dutch's office, he shows him the photostat and claims that he wants to join his organization. Dutch tells Frank to kill a tailor as his first assignment, but when going to the tailor's store, Leo and Rocky grab Frank and tell him that they are going to eliminate Jill instead. Arriving at the ballet studio, Jill blows Frank's cover by calling him lieutenant, resulting in a fistfight between Frank and the goons. Frank wins the fight and tells Jill to call Police Squad.

== Recurring jokes ==
- Tonight's special guest star: Florence Henderson, gunned down while she is singing in the kitchen. (The bottle of vegetable oil on the counter hints at Henderson's role as a commercial spokesperson for Wesson Oil at the time). Henderson later made a cameo appearance in Naked Gun 33 1/3: The Final Insult, as herself nominated for an Oscar.
- Next week's experiment: Bring those magazines you found under your father's bed.
- Johnny's next customer: A fireman wanting to know the best way to extinguish a furniture warehouse fire.
- Freeze frame gag: When Ed pours Frank some coffee, the episode ends and the coffee spills over the rim of Frank's cup. Frank eventually drops the cup and the coffee goes all over the floor.

== Notes ==
- The episode refers to Mommie Dearest (released by Paramount Pictures, whose television division produced Police Squad!), where a Joan Crawford lookalike pays off the mob at the "Mommie Dearest Day Care Center".
- Dutch Genderson is a clear spoof on the James Bond character Ernst Stavro Blofeld. He is introduced sitting in a chair stroking a cat, and his face is not initially revealed. Even his bending low upon his announcement, "When I'm through with him, he'll be dead!" is meant as a (more subtle) joke, since up to You Only Live Twice Blofeld's face is never seen in the movies.
