= William Byron Hillman =

American actor

- Born: William Byron Hillman
- Occupation: Filmmaker
- Spouse: Dianne Vallow
- Children: 3

William Byron Hillman is a film director, film producer, screenwriter, actor, and author known for his work on such films as The Photographer (1974), Double Exposure (1982), and Quigley (2003).

== Career ==
According to Hillman, after having attended Oklahoma Military Academy and UCLA School of Theater, Film and Television, he became an assistant to Harold Hecht, whom he met while on a casting call at Universal Studios. He was hired as a production assistant on the 1964 film Wild and Wonderful, wherein he was tasked with grooming and dyeing a number of dogs.

His first acting role was a part in the 1968 film Ice Station Zebra. He made his directorial debut with the 1974 film The Man from Clover Grove, and went on to write, produce and direct such films as The Photographer (which he somewhat remade as Double Exposure) and Quigley.

== Partial filmography ==
Year	Film	Director	Writer	Producer	Notes	Ref(s)
1974	The Man from Clover Grove	Yes	Yes	Yes		
1974	The Photographer	Yes	Yes	Yes		
1982	Double Exposure	Yes	Yes	Yes		
1984	Lovelines		Yes			
1990	Ragin' Cajun	Yes	Yes	Yes		
1998	The Adventures of Ragtime	Yes	Yes	Yes		
2003	Quigley	Yes	Yes	Yes		
?	Quigley 2	Yes	Yes	Yes		
?	Izzy's Story	Yes	Yes	Yes		
?	Ghosts and Phantoms	Yes	Yes	Yes		
?	Get Her	Yes	Yes	Yes		

=== Acting roles ===
Year	Film	Role	Notes	Ref(s)
1968	Ice Station Zebra	Philip Munsey	Credited as Bill Hillman	
1977	Bottoms Up	George		
1998	The Adventures of Ragtime	Law Client	Credited as Bill Hillman	
2003	Quigley	The Voice of God	Voice role	
