= Double Exposure (1982 film) =

1982 American film

- Theatrical release poster
- Directed by: William Byron Hillman
- Written by: William Byron Hillman
- Produced by: Michael Callan; Von Deming; William Byron Hillman
- Starring: Michael Callan; Joanna Pettet; James Stacy
- Cinematography: R. Michael Stringer
- Edited by: Lawrence Bridges
- Music by: Jack Goga
- Production company: Greyhill Productions
- Distributed by: Crown International Pictures
- Release date: August 27, 1982 (Indianapolis, Indiana)
- Running time: 95 minutes
- Country: United States
- Language: English

Double Exposure is a 1982 American horror film written and directed by William Byron Hillman, co-produced by Michael Callan, and starring Callan, Joanna Pettet, James Stacy, and Seymour Cassel. It is a loose remake of the 1974 film The Photographer, which was also written and directed by Hillman, produced by Deming, and starring Callan.

== Premise ==
The film follows a photographer who starts to experience dreams in which he murders the models he photographs.

== Cast ==
- Michael Callan as Adrian Wilde
- Joanna Pettet as Mindy Jordache
- James Stacy as B.J. Wilde
- Pamela Hensley as Sergeant Fontain
- Cleavon Little as Police Chief
- Seymour Cassel as Dr. Frank Curtis
- Robert Tessier as The Bartender
- David Young as Sergeant Buckhold
- Don Potter as Lewis
- Misty Rowe as Bambi
- Frances Bay as Old Woman
- Alfred Mazza as Charlie
- Jeana Tomasino as Renee
- Sally Kirkland as Hooker
- Debbie Zipp as Toni
- Joey Forman as Son
- Teressa Macky as April
- Terry Moore as Married Woman
- Ken Scott as Husband
- John Ripa as Detective Taylor
- Douglas Dean as Pop
- Lauren Purves as Girl at Bar
- Joanna Frank as The Bartender's Ex-Wife
- Jackson Hamilton as Car Salesman

== Production ==
The film was shot in early 1981. According to Cleavon Little, "all the actors got points in the project instead of real big salaries."

== Release ==
Double Exposure was given a regional limited release, opening in Indianapolis, Indiana on August 27, 1982, and in Lafayette, Indiana on September 3. It subsequently opened in Birmingham, Alabama on October 29, 1982. The film continued to screen regionally in the United States through the fall of 1982 in several cities, including Grand Junction, Colorado, Portland, Oregon, and Tallahassee, Florida. It opened in Roanoke, Virginia on January 14, 1983.

=== Home media ===
Scorpion Releasing issued Double Exposure on DVD on February 12, 2012.

In April 2017, Double Exposure was restored in 2K and released on DVD and Blu-ray by Vinegar Syndrome, both as a standard edition release and as a limited edition release with a slipcover.

== Reception ==
Mike Mayo of The Roanoke Times panned the film as "cliched, chaotic, pretentious, confusing, and boring." Ted Mahar of The Oregonian felt that the film's pacing was clunky, writing: "It's curious and slightly depressing to see Little and Pettet grinding away in this minor offering."

Lee Pfeiffer of Cinema Retro called the film "generally engrossing and well-made", though he wrote that the film's "ending veers into cliched 'woman in jeopardy' territory and the final few frames of the movie, in which the killer is unveiled, boasts some fine acting but disintegrates into a confusing and frustrating scenario in the last hectic seconds."

Paul Mavis of DVD Talk praised the film for its "exceptional" cinematography and music.

== Sources ==
- Young, R. G. (2000). The Encyclopedia of Fantastic Film: Ali Baba to Zombies. New York City, New York: Applause Theatre & Cinema Books. ISBN 978-1-557-8326-96.
- Willis, John (1984). Screen World 1984. New York City, New York: Crown Publishers. ISBN 978-0-517-55437-1.
