= The Photographer (1974 film) =

1974 American thriller film

- Theatrical release poster
- Directed by: William Byron Hillman
- Written by: William Byron Hillman
- Produced by: Von Deming
- Starring: Michael Callan; Barbara Nichols; Harold J. Stone; Edward Andrews; Jed Allan; Spencer Milligan
- Cinematography: Michael Shea
- Edited by: Tony de Zarraga
- Music by: Jack Goga
- Production companies: Intro Media Productions Inc. Destiny Worldwide Entertainment
- Distributed by: Embassy Pictures
- Release date: December 5, 1974
- Running time: 94 minutes
- Country: United States
- Language: English

The Photographer is a 1974 American thriller film written and directed by William Byron Hillman. The film stars Michael Callan, Barbara Nichols, Harold J. Stone, Edward Andrews, Jed Allan and Spencer Milligan. The film was released on December 5, 1974, by Embassy Pictures.

== Plot ==
Adrian Wilde outwardly presents himself as a respected photographer specializing in animal pictures. Privately, he is a serial killer who preys on aspiring models, creating scenarios where they will die and taking pictures of them through the entire process, especially their final death expressions. He has a very hostile relationship with his mother, who stood by as a previous lover attempted to choke him as a child, and now spends her time drinking and carousing with men, including his ostensible best friend Clinton, who fences stolen jewelry. Two homicide detectives, Lt. Luther Jacoby and Sgt. Sid Collins, repeatedly find his victims but initially do not see the links that connect them; ultimately, the coroner Joe, who is prone to prepare meals in the morgue, deduces that the victims are connected and that the killer is a photographer.

== Cast ==
- Michael Callan as Adrian Wilde
- Barbara Nichols as Mrs. Wilde
- Harold J. Stone as Lt. Luther Jacoby
- Edward Andrews as Sgt. Sid Collins
- Jed Allan as Joe Hennesey
- Spencer Milligan as Clinton Webber
- Susan Damante as Quinn Lovette
- Liv Lindeland as Mrs. Fowler
- Patty Bodeen as Candy Fain
- Betty Anne Rees as Karri Stephenson
- Jennifer Leak as Elowise Atkins
- Ronda Copland as Lisa Tuttle
- Isabel Sanford as Mrs. Slade
- Rai Bartonious as Murf
- Billy Hillman as Young Adrian Wilde

== History ==
Writer/Director Hillman had previously made the children's fantasy The Man from Clover Grove before conceiving this project. One of its producers was exploitation writer/director and sometime actor John Hayes. It was one of the last films to feature Barbara Nichols in a significant role; in the Richard Koper biography That Kind of Woman: The Life and Times of Barbara Nichols, Hillman described working with her as pleasant but difficult due to her alcoholism.

In 1982, Hillman, Callan, and composer Jack Goga reunited to make Double Exposure, a loose remake of The Photographer with Callan playing a character of the same name. In interviews, Hillman has suggested the film was a prequel, describing the events that led to the character becoming a killer.
