= Testimony of Evil (Dead Men Don't Laugh) =

- Police Squad! episode
- Episode no.: Season 1 Episode 6
- Directed by: Joe Dante
- Written by: Tino Insana: Robert Wuhl
- Original air date: July 8, 1982

Guest appearances
- William Conrad (special guest star); Dick Clark as himself; Dick Miller as Vic; Claudette Nevins as Veronica Rivers; Wayne Winton as Don; Jerry Lane as Willu; Danny Dayton as Joey Koldys

Episode chronology
← Previous "The Butler Did It (A Bird in the Hand)"	Next → The Naked Gun: From the Files of Police Squad!

"Testimony of Evil (Dead Men Don't Laugh)" is the sixth and final episode of the short-lived TV series Police Squad!. The episode was directed by Joe Dante and written by Tino Insana and Robert Wuhl. The episode was produced by Robert K. Weiss.

== Plot ==
A struggling comedian owes money to the owner of a nightclub. Following the discovery of the comedian's body at the bottom of a cliff in a car crash, it is initially believed that said accident was a suicide. However, it is later discovered that the comedian was also a police informant on a drug ring he infiltrated at his nightclub. Frank (Leslie Nielsen) intervenes and takes the place of the deceased at the nightclub in order to investigate further.

== Recurring jokes ==
- Tonight's special guest star: William Conrad, who (like Lorne Greene in the first episode) portrays a man who is thrown out of a moving car with a knife in his chest.
- Next week's experiment: Why cows look forward to giving milk.
- Johnny's next customer: Dick Clark, who wants help understanding a new type of music (ska) before asking for some more of Johnny's "secret formula youth cream".
- Freeze frame gag: The office falls apart around Frank, Ed and Norberg.
