= Spencer Milligan =

American actor (1937–2024)

- Born: September 10, 1937; Oak Park, Illinois, U.S.
- Died: April 18, 2024 (aged 86); Sturgeon Bay, Wisconsin, U.S.
- Occupations: Actor, producer

Spencer James Milligan (September 10, 1937 – April 18, 2024) was an American actor. He was best known for the role of Rick Marshall, the father of Will and Holly Marshall, on the first two seasons of the 1970s children science fiction TV series, Land of the Lost.

== Career ==
Prior to breaking into proper TV and film, in 1970, Milligan appeared, at age 33, in a United Airlines short tourism film about the City of Chicago, along with Shelley Long, during her modeling days at age 20-21, years before starring in Cheers.

Milligan left Land of the Lost after the second season due to a dispute with the producers of the show. Milligan wanted his share of any merchandising profits or royalties that the show generated. In a 2009 interview with the Associated Press, Milligan elaborated:

We had a difference of opinion, let's put it this way, on using my face for stuff and paying me—lunch boxes, compasses—where they were selling them and I thought it was only fair that everyone should get their fair share.

The show replaced Milligan's character Rick Marshall with Rick's brother Jack Marshall, played by actor Ron Harper. Milligan did not return for the brief scene at the beginning of "After-Shock," the first episode of the third season. This scene, which was also used in the opening credits of the third season, showed Rick Marshall being transported out of the Land of the Lost. Jon Kubichan, who both wrote and produced the episode, played the role instead, wearing a wig resembling Milligan's hair and standing with his back to the camera.

Although Spencer Milligan made various guest-starring roles on TV in the 1970s, his career slowed down in the 1980s. During the 1980s, Milligan lived in Malibu. He then relocated to the Dallas-Fort Worth Metroplex area in the 1990s, where he taught acting at Adam Roarke's Film Actors Lab (where Lou Diamond Phillips studied). One of Milligan's students was actor Benton Jennings. Milligan eventually moved back to his family's home in Wisconsin. His last known televised acting performance was in 1987, when he appeared on General Hospital.

In addition to teaching acting, Milligan directed local plays.

== Death ==
Milligan died in Sturgeon Bay, Wisconsin on April 18, 2024, at the age of 86.

== Filmography ==
A partial filmography follows.

=== Film ===
- Sleeper (1973) as Jeb Hrmthmg
- The Man From Clover Grove (1975) as Fester McLong
- The Photographer (1974) as Clinton Webber

=== Television ===
Year	Film	Role	Notes
1974	Land of the Lost	Rick Marshall	30 episodes (1974-1975)
1975	Gunsmoke	Jinx Tobin	"Brides and Grooms"
1976	The Keegans	Pat Keegan	TV movie
1976	The Bionic Woman	Reed	"Fly Jaime"
1977	The Bionic Woman	Schmidt	"Motorcycle Boogie"
1979	Quincy M.E.	Cliff Hanna	"Walk Softly Through the Night" parts 1 & 2
1979	Alice	David	"Little Alice Bluenose"
1980	Alcatraz: The Whole Shocking Story	Haskell	TV movie
1981	Terror Among Us	Alex	TV movie
1982	Police Squad!	Eddie Casales	"Revenge and Remorse (The Guilty Alibi)"
1987	The Magical World of Disney	Detective	"You Ruined My Life"
1987	General Hospital	Ray Gibbons	7 episodes
