= Cinderella complex =

Unconscious desire to be taken care of by someone else

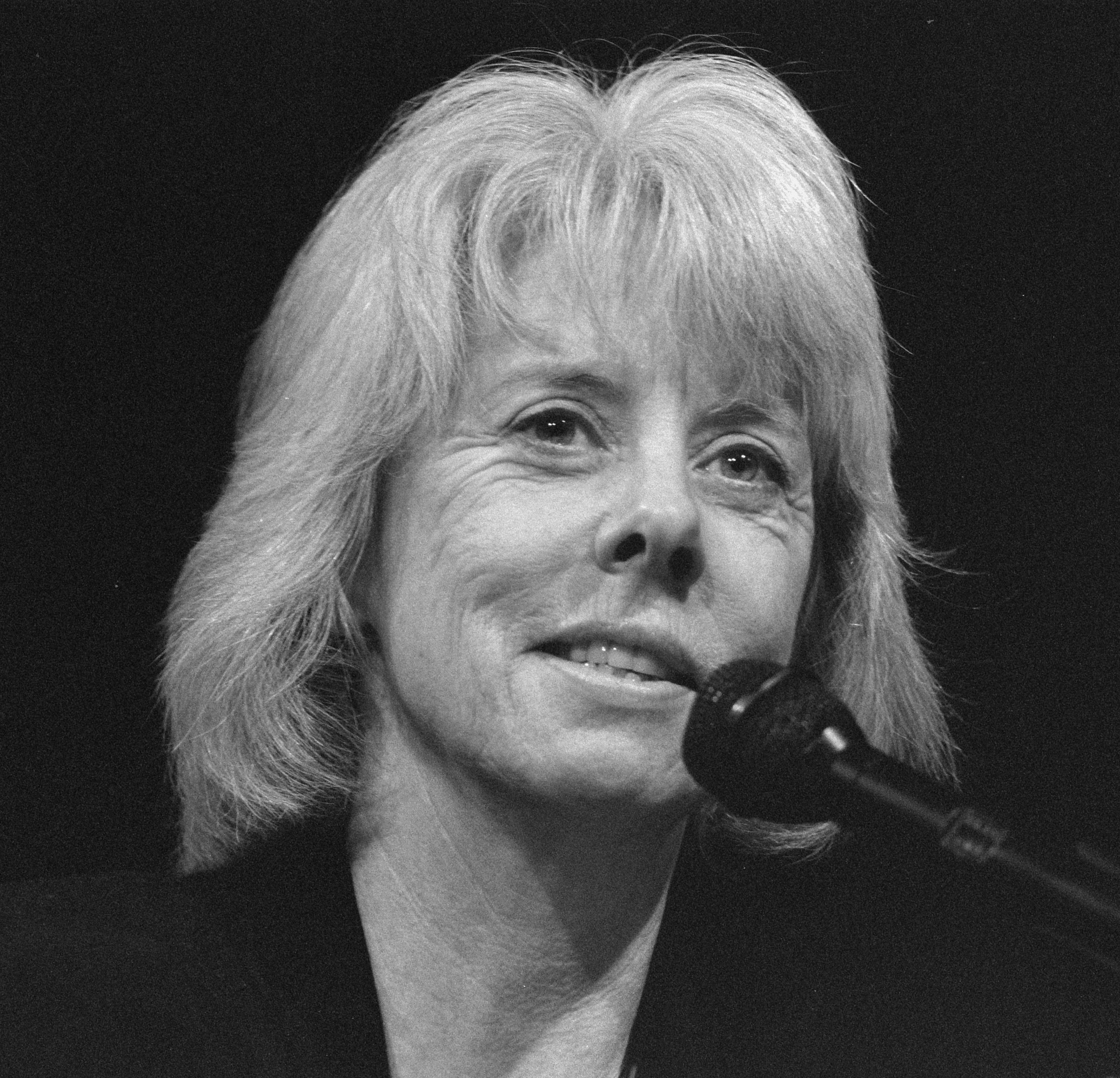
Colette Dowling in 1989.

The Cinderella complex was first described by Colette Dowling, who wrote a book on women's fear of independence – an unconscious desire to be taken care of by someone else. The complex is said to become more apparent as a person grows older.

The complex is named after the fairy tale character of Cinderella. Its title refers to an ideal of femininity as portrayed in that story, where a woman is expected to be beautiful, polite, supportive of others but fundamentally incapable of either taking care of herself or changing her situation through her own efforts. Instead she is taught that she needs to be protected and taken care by another, usually a man. (i.e., the Prince). Dowling examines the deleterious effects of this socialization on the psychology of girls and women.

== "The Cinderella Syndrome" ==
In 1981, Colette Dowling published an article titled "The Cinderella Syndrome" in The New York Times, which was adapted from her book, The Cinderella Complex: Women's Hidden Fear of Independence which was to be published that year.

== Additional perspectives ==
Others point to Ronald Fairbairn's concept of mature dependency, to challenge cultural disparagement of dependency in favor of an ideal of isolated independence. Carol Gilligan's championship of a web of connections as a feminist goal, rather than the solitary male hero, is also invoked to defend the Cinderella complex's tendency to define the self in terms of a mate/settled relationship.

== Popular culture ==
In 1955, the term Cinderella complex was already used by British writer Agatha Christie in her detective story Hickory Dickory Dock. The student of psychology, Colin McNabb, diagnoses a Cinderella complex with Celia Austin. And in 1960 Osbert Sitwell published the comedy The Cinderella Complex.

In the movie Tootsie, Teri Garr tells Dustin Hoffman during their break-up at the end of the movie, "I read the Cinderella Complex! I'm responsible for my own orgasm! I don't care, I just don't like to be lied to!"

In the TV series Police Squad! episode 4 "Revenge and Remorse", Joyce Brothers gets advice from the shoeshine man Johnny about how to treat the Cinderella complex: "Tell them to get in touch with their unconscious feelings and to share in the growth process with their partner."

It is also mentioned in Netflix's Sex Education in season 1 episode 7.

== See also ==
- Bridget Jones
- Family nexus
- Pamela, or Virtue Rewarded
- Sibling rivalry
