= Bachelor Party 2: The Last Temptation =

2008 film by James Ryan

- Directed by: James Ryan
- Screenplay by: Neal Israel; Pat Proft; Jay Longino
- Story by: Bob Israel
- Based on: Bachelor Party by: Neal Israel; Pat Proft; Bob Israel
- Produced by: Ron Moler; Raj Patel; William Sherak; Jason Shuman; Jeff Freilich
- Starring: Josh Cooke; Sara Foster; Warren Christie; Greg Pitts; Harland Williams
- Cinematography: Roy H. Wagner
- Edited by: Robert Komatsu
- Music by: James Dooley
- Production company: Blue Star Pictures
- Distributed by: 20th Century Fox Home Entertainment
- Release date: March 11, 2008
- Running time: 98 minutes (R-rated), 104 minutes (unrated)
- Country: United States
- Language: English

Bachelor Party 2: The Last Temptation is a 2008 American sex comedy film directed by James Ryan. The film, a sequel-in-name-only to a comedy made 24 years earlier (Bachelor Party), stars Josh Cooke as the bachelor and Sara Foster as his fiancée.

== Plot ==
A guy named Ron finally settled up and decided to marry his girlfriend Melinda, whom he met just two months ago. Her brother, Todd, hates Ron and tries to persuade Melinda that he is just marrying her to use her money for himself. He tries to talk Melinda out of the wedding, but before that, he tries to show who Ron really is so he decided to make a wild bachelor party, in hope of catching Ron and canceling the wedding.

== Cast ==
- Josh Cooke as Ron
- Harland Williams as Derek
- Greg Pitts as Jason
- Danny Jacobs as Seth
- Warren Christie as Todd
- Sara Foster as Melinda
- Emmanuelle Vaugier as Eva
- Max Landwirth as Tommy
- Karen-Eileen Gordon as Autumn
- Steven Crowley as Billy
- Audrey Landers as Bettina
- Mauricio Sanchez as The Plumber
- Chay Santini as Betty
- Kim Ostrenko as Irene

== Production ==
Principal photography occurred in Miami, Florida starting in March 2007.

== Reception ==
The trade publication Video Business said the film "moves at a fast clip, but the jokes are lackluster, leaving only the female cast members’ topless scenes as a potential selling point."

A reviewer for The Observer, an independent student-run newspaper covering Rutgers University, called it "one of the worst movies I have ever seen" and noted that it was only Sara Foster's appearance in the film that kept him watching.

IGN in its review of the DVD said "A film that probably shouldn't have been made, yet there are going to be loads of people out there who will enjoy this disaster because, as the old advertising motto states, "sex sells."
