= Hot Shots! =

1991 American comedy film by Jim Abrahams

- Theatrical release poster
- Directed by: Jim Abrahams
- Written by: Jim Abrahams; Pat Proft
- Produced by: Bill Badalato
- Starring: Charlie Sheen; Cary Elwes; Valeria Golino; Jon Cryer; Kevin Dunn; Bill Irwin; Lloyd Bridges
- Cinematography: Bill Butler
- Edited by: Jane Kurson; Eric A. Sears
- Music by: Sylvester Levay
- Production company: Peter V. Miller Investment Corp.
- Distributed by: 20th Century Fox
- Release date: July 31, 1991
- Running time: 84 minutes
- Country: United States
- Language: English
- Budget: $26 million
- Box office: $181.1 million

Hot Shots! is a 1991 American parody film directed by Jim Abrahams, co-writer and co-director of Airplane!, and written by Abrahams and Pat Proft. It stars Charlie Sheen, Cary Elwes, Valeria Golino, Lloyd Bridges, Jon Cryer, Kevin Dunn, Kristy Swanson, Bill Irwin, and Efrem Zimbalist Jr. The film is primarily a spoof of Top Gun, with some scenes spoofing other popular films, including 9½ Weeks, The Fabulous Baker Boys, Dances with Wolves, Marathon Man, Rocky, Superman, First Blood, and Gone with the Wind. A sequel, Hot Shots! Part Deux, was released in 1993, with Sheen, Golino, Bridges and Jerry Haleva reprising their roles.

== Plot ==
The film begins at Flemner Air Base 20 years in the past. A pilot named Leland "Buzz" Harley loses control of his plane and ejects, leaving his co-pilot Dominic "Mailman" Farnham to crash. Although Mailman survives, he is mistaken for a deer owing to the branches stuck to his helmet and is shot by a hunter.

Topper Harley wakes up from a nightmare he is having about the event when Lt. Commander Block asks him to return to active duty as a pilot in the U.S. Navy, to help on a new top secret mission: Operation Sleepy Weasel, commanded by the senile and accident-prone Admiral Benson. Harley experiences intense psychological problems, especially when his father is mentioned. His therapist, Ramada, tries to stop Topper from flying, but she relents, and also starts to fall in love with him. Meanwhile, Topper gets into a feud with another fighter pilot, Kent Gregory, Mailman's son and a former boyfriend of Ramada, who blames Buzz Harley for his father's death and believes Topper is dangerous.

Block starts privately meeting with an airplane tycoon, Mr. Wilson, who has recently built a new "Super Fighter" that will make the American pilots superior. Block reveals that he brought back Topper for the reason of making Sleepy Weasel fail. Block would then report that it was the Navy's planes that were the real reason for the mission failure and that they need to be replaced with Wilson's planes. During one of the last training missions, an accident between Pete "Dead Meat" Thompson and Jim "Wash Out" Pfaffenbach leaves Dead Meat killed and Wash Out demoted to radar operator. Block believes this is enough to convince the Navy to buy new fighters, but Wilson calls it a "minor incident", saying the planes need to fail in combat.

Topper develops a strong emotional attachment to Ramada, but she is haunted by her past with Gregory. On the carrier S.S. Essess, Benson reveals the mission to be an attack of an Iraqi nuclear plant and Block assigns Topper to lead the mission, much to Gregory's protest. Wilson, who is also on board, instructs a crew member to sabotage the planes, putting the pilots' lives at risk. In the midst of the mission, Block mentions Buzz Harley to Topper, who has a panic attack and is unable to lead. Block just starts to call out for the mission to be aborted when Iraqi fighters attack the squadron. All the planes' weapons fail, and Block, realizing what has happened, tells Topper that he saw what really happened with Buzz and Mailman: That Buzz tried to do everything possible to save Mailman, but ended up falling out of the plane, failing in his attempts.

With his self-confidence restored, Topper single-handedly beats the Iraqi fighters and bombs the nuclear plant, dropping a bomb directly on Saddam Hussein. Back aboard the ship, Wilson's plan is revealed, and his standing with the military is lost. Back in port, Gregory hails Topper as a great pilot and gives his blessing to Ramada to be with Topper. The end credits show Dead Meat and Mailman in spirit with Dead Meat saluting and Mailman giving a thumbs up with Elvis Presley.

== Cast ==
- Charlie Sheen as Lieutenant Sean "Topper" Harley
- Cary Elwes as Lieutenant Kent "Pirate" Gregory
- Valeria Golino as Ramada Thompson
- Lloyd Bridges as Rear Admiral Thomas "Tug" Benson
- Kevin Dunn as Lieutenant Commander James "Eyewitness" Block
- Jon Cryer as Lieutenant Jim "Wash Out" Pfaffenbach
- William O'Leary as Lieutenant Junior Grade Pete "Dead Meat" Thompson
- Kristy Swanson as Lieutenant Junior Grade Janet "Bio" Kowalski
- Efrem Zimbalist, Jr. as Mr. Wilson
- Bill Irwin as Lieutenant Commander Leland "Buzz" Harley
- Ryan Stiles as Lieutenant Dominic "Mailman" Farnham
- Heidi Swedberg as Mary Thompson
- Rino Thunder as Owatonna "The Old One"
- Charles Barkley as Himself
- Don Lake as Roy
- Cylk Cozart as Drill Sergeant
- Bill Laimbeer as Himself
- Jerry Haleva as Saddam Hussein
- Gene Greytak as Pope John Paul II
- Mark Arnott as Rosener

== Production ==
=== Filming ===
Principal photography was filmed throughout California in locations such as Hollywood Forever Cemetery and San Diego.

== Reception ==
=== Box office ===
The film debuted at number one in the United States, and grossed $180 million worldwide.

=== Critical response ===
The film holds an 83% approval rating at Rotten Tomatoes based on 29 reviews. The site's consensus reads, "Hot Shots! hits most of its parodic targets with aplomb, excelling as a daffy good time thanks to inspired gags and Charlie Sheen's crack comedic timing". Audiences polled by CinemaScore gave the film an average grade of "B" on an A+ to F scale. The film was chosen for the 1991 Royal Film Performance.

== Sequel ==
A sequel titled Hot Shots! Part Deux, was released in 1993.
