= Sumi Haru =

American actress

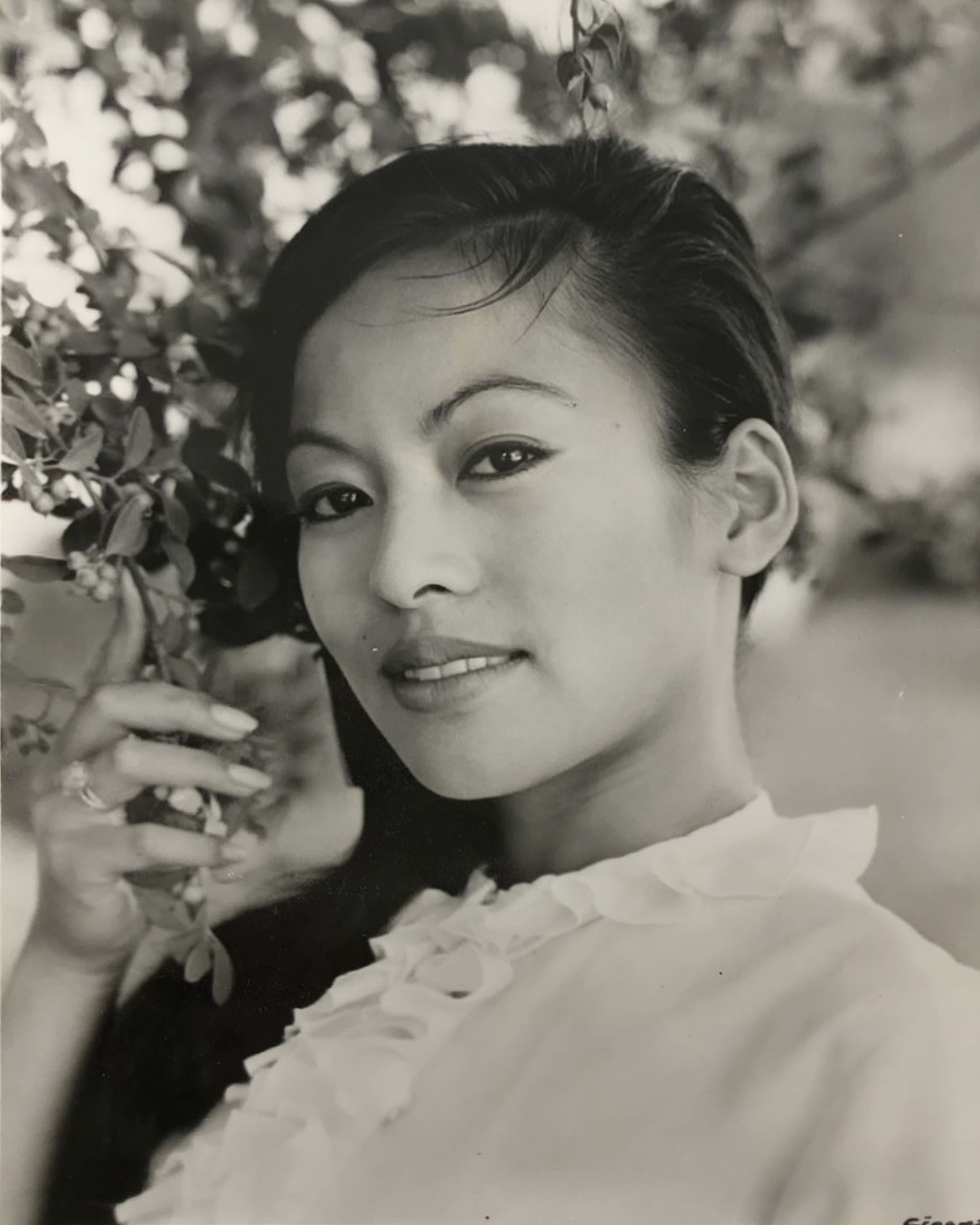
- Haru in Krakatoa, East of Java (1968)
- Born: Mildred Sevilla; August 25, 1939; Orange, New Jersey, United States
- Died: October 16, 2014 (aged 75); North Hollywood, Los Angeles, California, United States
- Occupation: Actress
- Years active: 1969–1981, 2008–2014
- Website: sumiharu.com

Sumi Haru (also known as Sumi Sevilla Haru; August 25, 1939 – October 16, 2014) was an American film and television actress, producer, actor, journalist, poet, and the first national vice-president of the Screen Actors Guild (SAG). Haru is best known for such films and television shows as Krakatoa, East of Java, M*A*S*H, The Beverly Hillbillies and Hill Street Blues.

She served as interim president of Screen Actors Guild in 1995, the first and to-date only woman of color to hold the position.

Haru was born Mildred Sevilla in 1939 at Orange, New Jersey to Filipino immigrants. After changing her name to Sumi Haru when launching her acting career, she became involved with the film and television labor movement to address issues concerning the lack of opportunities and roles for Asians.

Haru was a board member of the Screen Actors Guild (SAG) beginning in 1974, and also served multiple terms as the national recording secretary and first vice president.

Her autobiography, Iron Lotus: Memoirs of Sumi Sevilla Haru (CreateSpace Independent Publishing Platform, October 9, 2012; ISBN 978-1479331536), was published in 2012. The following year, she was elected for a two-year term as a member of the first elected national board of the merged SAG-AFTRA.

== Advocacy ==
Haru was very active and vocal as an advocate for the representation and career development of minorities in media. Her multitude of projects constantly pushed for opening America's minds to the inclusion of underrepresented ethnic groups.

She was a co-founder of SAG's Ethnic Employment Opportunities Committee in 1971 and helped negotiate affirmative action clauses into contracts. In 1995, Haru became a national vice president of the AFL-CIO.

Haru served as the co-president of the County of Los Angeles Media Image Coalition, which pushes for representation and career opportunities for underrepresented groups in the television and film industry. She is also the co-founder and president of the Association of Asian Pacific Artists.

In 1998, Haru was awarded the Visionary Award by East West Players (EWP), one of the oldest Asian Pacific American (APA) theater companies in the United States, in recognition for her contributions toward the APA community. She had previously served on EWP's board for 10 years, and had also starred in several productions as well.

Her six-year term as a national vice president marked the first time an Asian American has served on the AFL-CIO's executive council. She was president and co-founder of the Association of Asian Pacific American Artists, executive board member of the Asian Pacific American Labor Alliance and co-chair of the Rainbow Coalition Commission on Fairness in the Media. In 2009, Haru was honored with SAG's Ralph Morgan Award for distinguished service to SAG's Hollywood Division.

== Death ==
Haru died in North Hollywood, aged 75, on October 16, 2014. She had been suffering from emphysema.

== Filmography ==
Year	Title	Role	Notes
1968	Krakatoa, East of Java	Sumi	
1969	Ironside	Witness	
1970	M*A*S*H	Japanese Nurse	Uncredited
1971	The Beverly Hillbillies	Japanese Girl/Girl #2	
1973	Marcus Welby, M.D.	Patient	
1979	Fast Friends	TV Reporter	
1981	Hill Street Blues	Public Defender	
2008	Frank TV	Asian Passerby #1	
2010	Getting Played	Herself	
