= Hot Shots! Part Deux =

1993 comedy film by Jim Abrahams

- Theatrical release poster
- Directed by: Jim Abrahams
- Written by: Jim Abrahams; Pat Proft
- Produced by: Bill Badalato
- Starring: Charlie Sheen; Lloyd Bridges; Valeria Golino; Brenda Bakke; Richard Crenna
- Cinematography: John R. Leonetti
- Edited by: Malcolm Campbell
- Music by: Basil Poledouris
- Distributed by: 20th Century Fox
- Release date: May 21, 1993
- Running time: 89 minutes
- Country: United States
- Language: English
- Budget: $25 million
- Box office: $133.8 million

Hot Shots! Part Deux (also known as Hot Shots! 2) is a 1993 American parody film directed by Jim Abrahams and written by Abrahams and Pat Proft. It stars Charlie Sheen, Lloyd Bridges, Valeria Golino, Richard Crenna, Brenda Bakke, Miguel Ferrer, Rowan Atkinson, and Jerry Haleva. A sequel to Hot Shots! (1991), it is a parody of Rambo: First Blood Part II (1985) and Rambo III (1988), and follows a small group of soldiers on a mission to save prisoners of war in Iraq.

== Plot ==
One night, an American special forces team invades Saddam Hussein's palace and a nearby prison camp to rescue captured soldiers from Operation Desert Storm and to assassinate Saddam, but they find the Iraqis waiting for them, and the entire rescue team is captured. This failed operation turns out to be the latest in a series of rescue attempts which were foiled by the Iraqis, and consequently the advisors of President Benson suspect a mole in their own ranks. Colonel Denton Walters suggests that they recruit war hero Topper Harley for the next mission, but he has retired from the Navy and become a reclusive Buddhist in a small Thai village. Walters and Michelle Huddleston, of the Central Intelligence Agency, arrive and try to tempt him out of retirement in order to rescue the imprisoned soldiers and the previous rescue parties.

Topper initially refuses, but when yet another rescue mission (this one led by Walters) fails, he agrees to lead a small group of soldiers into Ba'athist Iraq. He is joined by Williams, Rabinowitz, and Harbinger, the sole escapee of the prior rescue mission and whom Topper suspects to be the saboteur. They parachute into an Iraqi jungle close to the heavily guarded hostage camp and set off to meet their contact, who turns out to be Topper's ex-girlfriend, Ramada. She guides them to a fishing boat that she prepared for their transportation. As they move toward the camp, she and Topper reminisce, and she explains that she was married before she met him. When she was informed that her husband, Dexter, was still alive and a prisoner in Iraq, she volunteered to participate in his rescue, but was instructed to keep this strictly confidential, forcing her to break up with Topper just as they were preparing to elope; this ultimately inspired Topper's decision to retire from the Navy.

Topper's team proceeds to the prison camp disguised as river fishermen, but a confrontation with an Iraqi patrol boat sets them back. When President Benson hears of the apparent demise of another mission, he decides to help the fight and joins additional forces in Iraq. However, Topper and his teammates have survived, and soon reach the Iraqi hostage camp. In the course of the operation, the alarm is raised and a gunfight ensues, during which Topper finds out that Harbinger is not the saboteur, but has merely become disillusioned in fighting, and manages to inspire him. After the prisoners are freed, Topper goes back to rescue Dexter, who is imprisoned in Saddam's palace.

While the squad evacuates the hostages, Topper enters Saddam's palace and encounters him, who pulls out his machine pistol and commands Topper to surrender. He overpowers Saddam, and they engage in a sword fight. President Benson arrives and orders Topper to release Dexter while Benson and Saddam continue the duel. Benson defeats Saddam by spraying him with a fire extinguisher, upon which he and his dog freeze and crack into pieces, only to subsequently melt, combine, and reform as Saddam with his dog's head, fur, nose and ears. In the meantime, Topper manages to locate Dexter, but is forced to carry him out on his shoulders as the Iraqis have tied his shoelaces together.

The squad heads back to the army helicopter, where Ramada, after an intense revelation involving unfounded jealousy, reveals and arrests Michelle as the saboteur who ruined the previous rescue attempts to assist the Iraqis. Dexter arrives with Topper and asks to take a picture of him and Ramada, but backs away too far and falls off a cliff. President Benson joins the escapees, and the evacuation team lifts off; Saddam is about to shoot them down when Topper and Ramada get rid of extra weight by pushing a piano out the open door, which crushes him. Reunited, Topper and Ramada kiss as they fly off into the sunset.

== Cast ==
- Charlie Sheen as Sean "Topper" Harley
- Lloyd Bridges as President Thomas "Tug" Benson
- Valeria Golino as Ramada Rodham Hayman
- Brenda Bakke as Michelle Huddleston
- Richard Crenna as Colonel Denton Walters
- Miguel Ferrer as Commander Arvid Harbinger
- Rowan Atkinson as Dexter Hayman
- Jerry Haleva as Saddam Hussein
- David Wohl as Gerou
- Mitchell Ryan as Senator Gray Edwards
- Michael Colyar as Williams
- Ryan Stiles as Rabinowitz
- Bob Vila as Himself
- Martin Sheen as U.S. Army Captain Benjamin L. Willard
- Ben Lemon as Team 2 Leader

== Reception ==
=== Box office ===
The film became a financial success at the box office in 1993, grossing over $130 million worldwide.

=== Critical response ===
Reviews for the film were mixed. Rotten Tomatoes gave it a score of 59% based on reviews from 34 critics with the consensus stating, "Audiences who enjoyed the first Hot Shots! will probably get tickled by this second helping, although the barrage of laughs miss more than they hit this time around".

Roger Ebert noted that the film references such movies as Rambo III, Lady and the Tramp, and Apocalypse Now, as well as the fairy tale Goldilocks and the Three Bears. He concluded, "Movies like this are more or less impervious to the depredations of movie critics. Either you laugh, or you don't. I laughed." On At the Movies, Ebert's colleague Gene Siskel praised director Abrahams for taking the jokes "one level further" and packing the frame with sight gags. Ebert said he enjoyed the film immensely, but wondered if the "genre may be reaching the end of its reproductive cycle" more than a decade after Airplane!

== Mockumentary promotion ==
As part of the film's promotion, a mockumentary was aired on HBO. Titled Hearts of Hot Shots! Part Deux—A Filmmaker's Apology, the mockumentary parodied Hearts of Darkness: A Filmmaker's Apocalypse, the 1991 documentary about the making of the film Apocalypse Now (which starred Charlie Sheen's father, Martin Sheen).
