= Krakatoa, East of Java =

1968 American disaster film

- Theatrical release poster
- Directed by: Bernard L. Kowalski
- Written by: Bernard Gordon; Clifford Newton Gould
- Produced by: William R. Forman; Philip Yordan
- Starring: Maximilian Schell; Diane Baker; Brian Keith; Sal Mineo; Sumi Haru
- Music by: Frank De Vol; Mack David
- Production company: Security Pictures
- Distributed by: Cinerama Releasing Corporation
- Release dates: December 26, 1968 (Sweden); January 9, 1969 (Tokyo); May 14, 1969 (United States)
- Running time: 131 min
- Language: English
- Box office: $3.7 million (US/Canada rentals)

Krakatoa, East of Java is a 1968 American disaster film starring Maximilian Schell and Brian Keith. During the 1970s, the film was re-released under the title Volcano. The story is loosely based on events surrounding the 1883 eruption of the volcano on the island of Krakatoa, with the characters engaged in the recovery of a cargo of pearls from a shipwreck perilously close to the volcano. The film was nominated for the Academy Award for Best Special Visual Effects. Krakatoa is actually due west of Java, but the movie's producers thought that "East" sounded more atmospheric.

== Plot ==
In 1883, the volcano on the island of Krakatoa begins to erupt, terrorizing the children at a mission school in Palembang on nearby Sumatra. In Anjer, Java, the steamer Batavia Queen, commanded by Captain Chris Hanson, takes aboard passengers: Douglas Rigby, owner and operator of a diving bell; balloonists Giovanni and Leoncavallo Borghese; diver Harry Connerly; Connerly's mistress Charley Adams; four female Japanese pearl divers led by Toshi; and Laura Travis, who had an extramarital affair with Hanson in Batavia. Laura was married to an abusive man with whom she had a son named Peter. When she asked for a divorce in order to stay with Hanson, her husband left her, taking both Peter and a fortune in pearls with him aboard the steamer Arianna. The Arianna had sunk off Krakatoa, and a guilt-ridden Laura, fearing that Peter had died, had spent a year in a mental institution.

Hanson has organized the voyage to find the Arianna, salvage the pearls, and find Peter if he is still alive. Colonial authorities arrive just before the Batavia Queen departs and force Hanson to take 30 convicts and their jailer aboard for transportation to Madura Island. Hanson plans to deliver the convicts to Madura after recovering the pearls off Krakatoa. One of the prisoners, Lester Danzig, is an acquaintance of Hanson's, and Hanson allows him to make the voyage on deck instead of in the hold. A colonial official warns that the island is a "raging volcano", but Hanson ignores him.

During the voyage to Krakatoa, her crew and passengers observe strange phenomena: seabirds swarming in huge flocks by day, a series of fiery explosions erupting from the sea, and a high-pitched, ear-splitting sound like that of escaping steam. Danzig discovers that Connerly is secretly using laudanum to kill the pain of a lung disease because it might interfere with his diving abilities. Danzig informs Connerly of Laura's time in the mental institution, calling into question the veracity of her story about the pearls. The Borgheses, Connerly, Charley, Rigby, and Toshi confront Hanson, but he assures them that her story is true.

The Batavia Queen arrives off Krakatoa to find the island shrouded in thick smoke. After it clears the Borgheses ascend in their balloon while Rigby descends in his diving bell. The Borgheses discover the wreck of the Arianna and guide the Batavia Queen and the submerged Rigby to it. Immediately afterwards, the motor driving the steering propeller fails and they careen helplessly into the volcano's crater. They jettison the useless engine to reduce weight and are blown clear by a volcanic explosion which sets their balloon afire. Drifting away from the island, they leap into the sea and are rescued.

Danzig tells Hanson of Connerly's lung problems, and Hanson decides that he will dive instead of Connerly. While Connerly and Hanson argue, Rigby's diving bell becomes snagged on coral. The pearl divers, Hanson, and Connerly all dive into the water to free Rigby. While everyone is occupied, Danzig steals a pistol and frees the prisoners. They take over the ship, throw the jailer overboard, and imprison the passengers and crew in the hold. Unaware of the events aboard the Batavia Queen, Hanson and Connerly find the Arianna's safe, and attach a cable to it to have it hoisted aboard. Upon their return, Danzig has Connerly lowered into the hold but forces Hanson to look on at gunpoint as he opens the Arianna's safe. They find nothing inside but a cheap pocket watch. When an explosion on Krakatoa distracts Danzig, Hanson overpowers him, and manages to drive the remaining prisoners off the ship.

After Hanson frees the passengers and crew, Rigby finds another compartment in the safe which contains the Arianna's logbook. The logbook reveals the Arianna made a port call at Palembang before sinking, and a letter tucked into the logbook says Peter disembarked there to attend the mission school. Hanson steams to Palembang to find Peter. By now, Krakatoa is erupting continually, hurling lava bombs into the surrounding sea. Toshi is killed when one of the lava bombs strikes her.

The Batavia Queen arrives off Palembang to find the mission school heavily damaged and abandoned. Hanson hails a passing junk and is informed that the school's staff and students had fled Palembang that morning, intending to sail to Java. The Batavia Queen comes to the assistance of a sinking sampan, which proves to be the school's boat. The Batavia Queen's rescue everyone aboard the sampan, including Peter, who has a joyful reunion with Laura. A chest belonging to Peter is brought aboard the Batavia Queen. It contains the missing pearls, and Connerly, Rigby, the Borgheses, and the three surviving pearl divers receive their shares of the fortune.

Krakatoa's violent explosions increase; Hanson assumes that they will cause a tsunami and prepares the Batavia Queen to ride it out. Hanson attempts to assure Connerly that they will be safer on the ship, but Connerly demands that he and any other passenger be allowed to disembark. Giovanni Borghese, Charley, and the three surviving pearl divers join Connerly in the lifeboat and row to Anjer.

Krakatoa disintegrates in one final, cataclysmic explosion, which generates an enormous tsunami. It strikes Anjer shortly after the Batavia Queen's lifeboat arrives; unable to outrun the wave, Connerly and Charley embrace for the last time before the wave engulfs and kills them. At sea, Hanson, Laura, Peter, Rigby, Leoncavallo Borghese, the refugees from the mission school, and the ship's crew ride out the tsunami successfully aboard the Batavia Queen.

== Cast ==
(as given in end credits)

- Maximilian Schell as Captain Chris Hanson
- Diane Baker as Laura Travis
- Brian Keith as Harry Connerly
- Barbara Werle as Charley Adams
- Sal Mineo as Leoncavallo Borghese
- Rossano Brazzi as Giovanni Borghese
- John Leyton as Dr. Douglas Rigby
- J.D. Cannon as Lester Danzig
- Jacqui Chan as Toshi
- Rob't Hall as Guard [spelled "Robert" in opening credits]
- Victoria Young as Kiko
- Marc Lawrence as Mr. Jacobs (First Mate)
- Midori Arimoto as Midori
- Niall MacGinnis as Harbor Master (David)
- Joseph Hann as Mr. Kuan (Second Mate)
- Sumi Haru as Sumi
- Geoffrey Holder as Sailor
- Alan Hoskins as Jan
- Peter Kowalski as Peter Travis

Additionally, Peter Graves is listed in the opening credits.

== Production ==
=== Development ===
In February 1955 Philip Yordan announced he would write and produce a film of the Krakatoa eruption with a budget of US$2 million to US$3 million being spent on special effects. It was going to be the first film made under Yordan's contract with Columbia Pictures. Jerry Wald would be executive producer. It took a number of years for the movie to be made, and in the meantime Yordan started making movies in Spain. In January 1967 he said he intended to film background footage for the movie in Indonesia and wanted Rock Hudson to star.

In February 1967 Milo Frank arrived in Madrid to begin supervising production of the film. Bernard L. Kowalski was attached to direct; Kowalski was best known for his television work, including the pilots for Mission Impossible, The Rat Patrol, The Monroes, and N.Y.P.D.. The director said "That seemed to impress the Cinerama people who were looking for a young director who could handle what looked to be a pretty difficult picture." The script was co-written by Bernard Gordon, a blacklisted writer who did a number of scripts for Yordan under pseudonyms.

Finance came in part from the ABC network.

=== Special effects ===
In an unusual approach to making the film, the producers of Krakatoa, East of Java had the special effects scenes shot before the script had been completed. The script then was written so as to incorporate the special effects sequences.

The French film director, art director, production designer, set designer, and screenwriter Eugène Lourié had worked for the film's producers as art and special-effects director for the 1965 movie Crack in the World, and they hired him to create the special effects for Krakatoa, East of Java.

In 1965, Lourié scouted the coast of Spain for a suitable steamer for use in the film as the fictional Batavia Queen; ultimately he chose a cargo ship – a former passenger-cargo ship employed as a tramp steamer between Spain and Morocco – he found unloading coal at a pier in Bilbao whose captain said she had been built in England sometime around 1880.

Lourié had the steamer remodeled in Málaga, Spain, at a shipyard which transformed her into the Batavia Queen by increasing the height of her funnel and masts and installing new yards on her masts and a new bowsprit and carved wooden figurehead on her bow. The steamer also was provided with functioning sails for her masts and yards.

For special effects, Lourié's team constructed two models of the modified steamer, a one-to-ten-scale model that was 18 feet (5.5 m) long, and, for long shots of the Batavia Queen as she approaches Krakatoa, a one-to-twenty-scale model. The latter proved too small to provide realistic effects, so Lourié chose not to use it in the film, instead using only the larger model.

After considering a water tank in Malta, Lourié chose the water tank he had used for the 1964 film Flight from Ashiya at Cinecittà in Rome to film special effects sequences depicting the Batavia Queen at sea. The tank was approximately 300 by 400 feet (91 by 122 m) in area and had a sky backing of 70 feet (21 m). The sequences were filmed using three Super Panavision 70 cameras running at three times normal speed to make the movements of the miniatures more realistic, although the cameras were not designed for such work and often overheated and required repairs. Lourié tried to disguise the miniature Batavia Queen's lack of a crew or passengers as she gets underway for Palembang, slowly picking her way through a narrow passage under a rain of lava bombs while Krakatoa erupts nearby, by enveloping her in smoke. For the final sequence in which the Batavia Queen rides out a very large tsunami at sea, Lourié's team spent three days filming the model in the water tank in extreme conditions, creating large waves through the use of 35-foot (11 m) dump tanks with a capacity of 2,600 gallons (9,800 liters), (Note: The source does not specify the type of gallon it uses. This metric conversion from English units assumes that the English unit used is the United States liquid gallon. If the unit used is the imperial gallon, then the amount in liters is 11,800.) spraying water into the tank with powerful fire hoses, and employing a wind machine to disturb the water's surface.

For sequences in which live actors are seen against a village in the background, the film employed traveling mattes in the foreground and miniatures in the background.

Alex Weldon created the pyrotechnic sequences of Krakatoa erupting and, eventually, exploding. Scenes of the volcano erupting in the distance were created using a split screen, with real footage of the ocean in the lower part of the frame and a flopped volcano miniature reflection added above it in an optical printer.

The visual effects, relying entirely on in-camera model work, are still impressive today and considered an immense achievement by 1969 standards, enough so for it to be nominated for the Academy Award for Best Visual Effects. It lost to Marooned.

Lourié himself makes a non-speaking cameo appearance in Krakatoa, East of Java, portraying a lighthouse keeper on the coast of Java who observes Krakatoa's final, cataclysmic explosion and enters the lighthouse to send news of it by telegraph.

=== Yordan's departure ===
In addition to its challenging special effects, the makers of Krakatoa, East of Java encountered various difficulties during the film's production. Producer Philip Yordan dropped out of the production after its special effects had already been shot, and a new associate producer came on board who commissioned a new script.

These changes in leadership led to conceptual changes that created some inconsistency in tone and odd moments in the finished film. While apparently conceiving Krakatoa, East of Java overall as a family-friendly adventure story, the producers also opted to attract a more adult audience by including some sordid and racy elements: the tortured relationship between Connerly and Charley and Laura's extramarital affair with Hanson, as well as a striptease Charley performs for Connerly in their state room.

At other times, the film's soundtrack is clumsily incorporated into the narrative: while performing her striptease, Charley sings a rendition of "A Nice Old-Fashioned Girl" that would be appropriate in a musical but seems strangely out of place in an adventure or disaster film, and the vocal version of the film's romantic theme song "East of Java" incongruously plays during scenes of filthy prisoners shuffling into the Batavia Queen's hold and sweating sailors performing the labor necessary to get the ship out to sea as she begins her voyage from Anjer.

Kowalski said "We had more than our share of problems because you can't control such varying conditions as weather, sea, children and animals. But nearly everyone bore up under very trying circumstances. My life was only threatened four times."

Kowalski added that "the tendency in Cinerama has been to employ wide-angle shots that show everybody in the scene. I'm not doing that. I'm cutting quickly from one shot to another so things happen. I'm also devoting much care to the characters. I think if you have a bunch of people that the audience cares about, then you can build up the big scenic effects with no difficulty."

=== Title ===
During production of Krakatoa, East of Java, its producers became aware that Krakatoa is, in fact, west of Java – and east of Sumatra. (Mount Tambora, on Sumbawa, much less well known than Krakatoa despite its own – and even larger – cataclysmic explosion in 1815, is the violent volcano east of Java.) Despite the geographic error in the film's title, its makers chose to leave it unchanged, apparently believing that it was a more exotic title than Krakatoa, West of Java. Furthermore, the film aided in popularizing the spelling "Krakatoa", as opposed to the Indonesian spelling "Krakatau".

=== Film format ===
Krakatoa, East of Java was filmed in Super Panavision 70 (with some scenes filmed in Todd-AO), and presented in 70 mm Cinerama in some cinemas. Appearing in cinemas as interest in Cinerama's widescreen format waned, it is the only disaster movie ever to appear in the format.

=== Novelization ===
Michael Avallone wrote a novelization of the movie with the same title.

== Historical inaccuracy ==
The catastrophic 1883 eruption of Krakatoa destroyed most of the uninhabited island and generated tsunamis exceeding 30 meters (100 feet) in height that struck the western coast of Java and southern coast of Sumatra, killing about 35,000 people, while a pyroclastic flow from the volcano that traveled across the Sunda Strait killed about another 1,000 people on Sumatra. Krakatoa, East of Java is only very loosely based on the actual events surrounding the eruption, which it uses merely as a backdrop for its storyline.

Hanson's statement early in the film that Krakatoa had been quiet for 200 years is accurate – the last eruption prior to 1883 appears to have been in 1680 – and his view that the ongoing volcanic activity on the island, which had begun in May 1883, did not pose a threat to anyone not actually on Krakatoa itself reflected the attitude of many people in the area during the summer of 1883, some of whom treated the erupting volcano as a tourist attraction.

Krakatoa is actually located west, not east, of Java.

The Batavia Queen appears to require at least three days to make the voyage from Anjer to Krakatoa. In fact, the two locations are only 31 miles (50 km) apart, and the ship could have made the voyage in a few hours.

The beginning sequence of the film depicts the fictional mission school at Palembang as lying within sight of Krakatoa; in fact, Palembang lies 354 kilometres (220 mi) from Krakatoa. Late in the film, when the Batavia Queen arrives off Palembang in search of Peter Travis, Palembang appears to be along the coast of Sumatra; however, Palembang, while accessible to ships via the Musi River, lies well inland. The Batavia Queen finds the mission school in ruins and ablaze because of Krakatoa's eruption; although Krakatoa's eruption was audible in Palembang and the air pressure wave from its final explosion was strong enough to shake the walls of houses and cause cracks to appear in some, the town did not suffer the serious damage implied by the condition of the mission school in the film.

The violent and continuous explosions on Krakatoa as the Batavia Queen steams from Krakatoa to Palembang and then to the vicinity of Anjer late in the film appear to depict the final, cataclysmic eruption of the volcano on 26–27 August 1883. The huge tsunami that engulfs Anjer and its lighthouse in the film's climactic sequence is consistent with the wave that struck the west coast of Java on the morning of 27 August 1883, rising to a height of 40 meters (130 ft) at Merak and destroying both Anjer – where it was 10 metres (33 ft) tall – and the Fourth Point Lighthouse.

While the Batavia Queen, her passengers and crew, and the story of her voyage are entirely fictitious, her experience in encountering the tsunami at sea at the end of the film bears a striking resemblance to that of the interisland steamer Gouverneur-Generaal Loudon, which rode out a very large tsunami while steaming in the Sunda Strait on the morning of 27 August 1883.

The film's depiction of the salvage participants dividing up the pearls among themselves is legally flawed. The pearls are not found on the wreck; they are later located in the possession of Laura's son. Nevertheless, the salvage partners divide the treasure equally. According to maritime law, the pearls are not salvage and are the legal property of the boy. The salvage partners have no right to the pearls.

== Reception ==
=== Critical reception ===
Krakatoa, East of Java received generally poor reviews, with critics claiming that the story was pedestrian, badly paced, and poorly told, and the special effects so constant and overwhelming as to become numbing. Vincent Canby in The New York Times was one of those disappointed with the special effects, claiming that he recognized "volcanic rock that had flown by me before." However, a few critics declared the film enjoyable and a vivid depiction of exotic places and life at sea. The Los Angeles Times called it "one of the best movies ever made in Cinerama ... Excellent in all aspects, it is an artistic as well as a cinematic triumph." Stanley Newman in Cue magazine called it "simple-minded fun" and Francis Herridge in the New York Post had kind words for its recreation of the devastation.

The geographic error in the film's title of placing the doomed island east of Java was widely mocked in the reviews.

=== Box office ===
Krakatoa, East of Java reached number one at the US box office in December 1969 following its second run showcase release in New York. Based on the cities used by Variety for their weekly box office chart, it was the seventeenth highest-grossing film of the year in the United States.

== Later releases ==
Reprocessed in "Feelarama", a version of the then-popular Sensurround, the movie was re-released under the title Volcano during the 1970s.

Although it originally had a running time of 127 minutes (not counting overture, intermission, and exit music included in the 1969 theatrical release), the movie has often been seen since then on television and in 16 mm prints in a truncated 101-minute version, with some scenes shortened or deleted. In the 101-minute version, the sequences showing key passengers arriving aboard the Batavia Queen at Anjer and the voyage of the Batavia Queen's lifeboat to Anjer are shortened, while the opening sequence showing terrified children at the mission school in Palembang, Charley's song and striptease for Connerly in their stateroom, and Charley's tearful pleas to Hanson to have Connerly set free from the box suspended above the Batavia Queen's deck are missing.

== Home media ==
Krakatoa, East of Java was released by MGM Home Video on March 22, 2005, as a Region 1 widescreen DVD.

== In popular culture ==
Krakatoa, East of Java's storyline bears many similarities to that of the 1953 film Fair Wind to Java starring Fred MacMurray, which tells the story of a race between an American sea captain and an Indonesian pirate leader to recover a legendary fortune in diamonds from Krakatoa in 1883 just before the island explodes.

In the episode "Someone to Watch Over Me" of the series Frasier, one of the titles between sections reads "KRAKATOA, WEST OF JAVA (THE MOVIE WAS WRONG)".

The film is mentioned by Jerry Seinfeld in the Seinfeld episode "The Truth": "Those brave Krakatoans, east of Java, who sacrificed so much for so long!"

It is parodied in the Monty Python sketch "Scott of the Antarctic" as "Krakatoa, East of Leamington".

In the final episode of Eerie, Indiana, one character can be heard saying on the phone, "Who cares if Krakatoa isn't really east of Java?", referring to getting a bad grade on a test.

Krakatoa, East of Java was the first film that British film critic Mark Kermode ever saw.

The phrase "Krakatoa, east of Java" is used in the lyrics to the 1979 song "Lava" by The B-52's, included in their first album The B-52's: "My heart's crackin' like a Krakatoa. Krakatoa, east of Java, molten bodies, fiery lava." It also appears in the song "New World Disorder" by Biohazard, from the album of the same name.

The film is mentioned in the Wings episode "Just Say No". When Brian jokes that if his date the previous night had been a movie, "waves would be crashing, rockets would be launching, and volcanoes would be erupting," Lowell replies, "I've seen that movie: Krakatoa, East of Java. There wasn't much sex, but nobody had any time."

In 1982 the French group Indochine wrote the song, À l'est de Java, narrating the story of the movie. The lyrics were written by Nicola Sirkis and the music was composed by Dominik Nicolas.

An exterior shot of the Cinerama Dome in the 2019 Quentin Tarantino film Once Upon a Time in Hollywood depicts the theater in 1969 advertising Krakatoa, East of Java. The recreated vintage posters were left on the theater's exterior as part of Once Upon a Time in Hollywood's 70mm engagement there.

== See also ==
- List of American films of 1968
