= Made in Paris =

1966 film by Boris Sagal

- Directed by: Boris Sagal
- Written by: Stanley Roberts
- Produced by: Joe Pasternak
- Starring: Ann-Margret; Louis Jourdan; Richard Crenna; Chad Everett
- Cinematography: Milton R. Krasner
- Edited by: William McMillin
- Music by: George E. Stoll
- Production company: Euterpe
- Distributed by: Metro-Goldwyn-Mayer
- Release date: February 9, 1966 (United States)
- Running time: 103 minutes
- Country: United States
- Language: English
- Box office: $1,300,000 (est. US/ Canada rentals)

Made in Paris is a 1966 American romantic-comedy film starring Ann-Margret, Louis Jourdan, Richard Crenna, Edie Adams, and Chad Everett. The film was written by Stanley Roberts and directed by Boris Sagal.

== Plot ==
An American girl from New York finds herself in a love triangle in Paris. Maggie Scott works as an assistant buyer for Irene Chase. Irene is a fashion buyer for Barclay Ames, an upscale clothing store in New York owned by Roger Barclay.

Ted Barclay, the son of Roger Barclay, takes a special interest in Maggie. After taking her on a date, he finds that her morals are different from the multitude of his previous women. This bachelor doesn’t seem to mind a good chase.

Irene sends Maggie to Paris as her representative for the annual fashion shows of the major European fashion designers, such as Marc Fontaine, Dior, and Balenciaga. The most important show is Marc Fontaine because Barclay Ames is the only store in New York that handles Fontaine gowns, and Maggie must keep that rapport between the two companies on her trip. Worried for Maggie’s safety, Ted calls his Paris-based columnist friend, Herb Stone, to look after her in Paris.

Maggie’s arrival in Paris is paired with a warning from Herb Stone that she may lose all of her inhibitions, which she quickly denies could happen. Marc Fontaine, the handsome French designer, had a relationship with Irene. It doesn’t take long for the Parisian scenery to play with Maggie’s emotions, leading her into the arms of Mr. Fontaine. Herb Stone completes the love triangle by pursuing Maggie as well. His version of a good time doesn’t involve the exciting dance club Maggie dances in for Mr. Fontaine. He would rather settle down in the bedroom.

Ted Barclay decides to fly to Paris to win Maggie’s heart once and for all.

== Cast ==
- Ann-Margret as Maggie Scott
- Louis Jourdan as Marc Fontaine
- Richard Crenna as Herb Stone
- Edie Adams as Irene Chase
- Chad Everett as Ted Barclay
- John McGiver as Roger Barclay
- Marcel Dalio as Georges
- Mathilda Calnan as Cecile
- Jacqueline Beer as Denise Marton
- Marcel Hillaire as attendant
- Michele Montau as Elise
- Reta Shaw as American bar singer
- Count Basie as himself
- Count Basie Orchestra as themselves
- Mongo Santamaría as himself
- Majel Barrett as Mrs. David Prentiss (uncredited)

== Production ==
=== Development ===
MGM announced the film was part of its line up in February 1964. Doris Day was meant to star but she did not like the script, so Ann-Margret (who had just made Once a Thief and The Cincinnati Kid for MGM) was signed.

Bob Crane, who had just shot the pilot for Hogan's Heroes, was offered the male lead as a newspaperman. This part was played by Richard Crenna.

Richard Chamerblain was offered the role of the department store buyer, but he dropped out after he read the script. This role was played by MGM contractee Chad Everett.

Louis Jourdan signed to play the male lead. There was a report he pulled out when he discovered his character did not end up with the female lead.

Filming took place on the MGM backlot.

=== Fashion ===
The costumes worn by Edie Adams, Ann-Margret and the fashion models were created by costume designer Helen Rose.

Edie Adams wears a form-fitting, black-velvet, beaded gown that flares out at the knee with a satin skirt covered in coque feathers. Her matching cape is made of black-crepe chiffon featuring beading and three rows of coque feathers (13 min., 13 sec. into the film).

Ann-Margret’s arrival in Paris costume is a blue-beige coat completely lined with fox fur and worn over a sheath.

The Fontaine fashion show starts at 42 minutes into the movie featuring Helen Rose designs. ‘Golden Avalanche’ Three-piece ski suit of golden-yellow, stretch, jersey, slim pants, and the fingertip jacket is lined with silver grey Persian lamb, and a hooded sweater of Persian lamb.

‘Swirling Amethysts’ (45 min., 35 sec. into the film) Three hundred yards of pleated silk chiffon, the high rise neckline and low back bodice is of amethysts, rubies, gold, and diamonds.

Ann-Margret’s ‘After-Five Costume’ (50 min., 30 sec. into the film) Carl velvet coat embroidered and banded with sables.

Hair styling was done by Sydney Guilaroff.

=== Music ===
- "Made in Paris" - Trini Lopez (written by Burt Bacharach and Hal David)
- "Lottie" – Count Basie Orchestra
- "Skol Sister" – Count Basie Orchestra

Jazz music plays in the background for most of the film. Maggie Scott (Ann-Margret) performs a dance to a band in a Paris night club 55 minutes and 47 seconds into the film.

== Quotes ==
- Ted: “Ms. Scott, are you bucking for sainthood?”
- Maggie: “No, no I’m just an average American girl. I have the foolish idea that I’d like to settle down in the suburbs with a man I love and have children, and maybe even have a station wagon, and two of those large dogs with hair in front of their eyes. I'm sure you think that's square Mr. Barclay.”
- Herb Stone: “Any American girl today has two completely different sets of morals. Back in the States, a girl, like Maggie, watches every step but she has her mind on just one thing, a wedding ring. Well, here in Paris, she has no chance of getting married so she lets her hair down. She does all the things she's always wanted to do. Plus, a few things that uh, she never thought of.”
- Mark Fontaine: “Do you know what you really want, Maggie? You want a thrilling evening of 'almost'. Yes, almost romance, almost love, almost sex. Maggie, I told you Paris would give you whatever you were looking for. You've got it. And you've put me in the position of a guide. Very well, very well, I hope I’ve given you proper service, Miss Scott. Now that we've shown you our best imitation of romance, what would you like to see next? The Eiffel Tower? The Arch of Triumph? Oh, I know the wax museum. Sex, lust, passion, but not real, not real, Miss Scott. Just the way you like it. Fake, all in one.”

== Reception ==
=== Critical response ===
MGM was so impressed with Crenna's performance that it signed him to a three-picture deal.

The Los Angeles Times wrote that the film "was just not in the same class as Gigi" although Ann-Margret "gave her all."

Bosley Crowther of The New York Times wrote in his review: "the styles of his chignon creations are still pretty much the same as they were in the days when he was piling impossible tresses on fabulous stars. Likewise, the contents of this picture, which came to neighborhood theaters yesterday, fall into a pattern not dissimilar to that of movies made 30 years ago."

The staff at Variety wrote: "Stanley Roberts’ dull script, strongly reminiscent of yesteryear Doris Day-Rock Hudson-Cary Grant plots (but less effective), finds fashion buyer Ann-Margret rushed to Paris from the lecherous arms of her employer’s son (Chad Everett)."

Filmink wrote "This should have been fun – producer Joe Pasternak built his career on bright wish-fulfilment stuff like this – but it misses, hurt particularly by dodgy writing and uninspiring male leads."

=== Release ===
Made in Paris was released on DVD by Warner Home Video on June 22, 2009.

== See also ==
- List of American films of 1966
