= Chay Santini =

Puerto Rican actress

- Born: San Juan, Puerto Rico
- Education: Florida State University
- Occupations: Actress and model

Chay Lynn Santini is a Puerto Rican fashion model and actress who in 1998 was named "Latina Super Model of the Year" by Avon Products, Inc.

== Early years ==
Santini was born in San Juan and raised between Puerto Rico and Tampa, Florida. She moved to Tallahassee, Florida, where she enrolled in the Florida State University. She studied and modeled at the same time for magazines and for companies such as Motorola and Avon. She graduated with a bachelor's degree in studio art, along with taking pre-med classes.

== Acting career ==
In 1998, Santini landed a small and uncredited part as a cheerleader in Adam Sandler's movie The Waterboy. That experience motivated her to become an actress, and as a result she enrolled and attended the American Academy of Dramatic Arts and The School for Film and Television Acting School.

Also, in 1998, Santini was honored by being named Latina Super Model of the Year by Avon.

She returned to Puerto Rico and on September 21, 2000, she represented San Juan in the Miss World Puerto Rico pageant. She was chosen as First Runner-Up and won awards for Best Skin, Best Legs, Best Hair, and Best Figure.

Santini was cast as "Alejandra Santiago" in episode 34 ("Family Reunion") in the television series She Spies. In 2004, Santini played the role of "Diane" in the movie Seeing Other People.

== Acting roles ==
Santini has participated in the following:

Actress

- The Waterboy (1998) (uncredited) - Cougar Cheerleader
- Directing Eddie (2001) (uncredited) - Oliver's Girl
- Nightstalker (2002) - Teenage Girl, "Tina"
- Stunt C*cks (2004) - Alexxxis
- Seeing Other People (2004) - Diane
- Bachelor Party 2: The Last Temptation (2008) - Betty

Miscellaneous crew

- Kiss the Bride (2002) - set costumer
- May (2002) - set costumer
- This Girl's Life (2003) - set costumer

Notable TV guest appearances

- Popular, playing "Salsa Girl" in episode "The Brain Game" (episode # 2.18), April 27, 2001
- The Geena Davis Show, playing "Cheerleader" in episode "White Moms Can't Jump" (episode # 1.21), July 10, 2001
- The Andy Dick Show, playing "Renee" in episode "The Garage Sale" (episode # 3.6), 2002
- She Spies, playing "Alejandra Santiago" in episode "Family Reunion" (episode # 2.14), February 9, 2004

== See also ==
- List of Puerto Ricans
- Corsican immigration to Puerto Rico
