= Bachelor Party (1984 film) =

1984 American sex comedy film by Neal Israel

- Theatrical release poster
- Directed by: Neal Israel
- Written by: Neal Israel; Pat Proft
- Story by: Bob Israel
- Produced by: Bob Israel; Ron Moler
- Starring: Tom Hanks; Adrian Zmed; William Tepper; Tawny Kitaen
- Cinematography: Hal Trussell
- Edited by: Tom Walls
- Music by: Robert Folk
- Distributed by: 20th Century Fox
- Release date: June 29, 1984
- Running time: 105 minutes
- Country: United States
- Language: English
- Budget: $7 million
- Box office: $38.4 million (USA)

Bachelor Party is a 1984 American sex comedy film directed by Neal Israel, written by Israel and Pat Proft, and starring Tom Hanks, Adrian Zmed, William Tepper, and Tawny Kitaen. The film revolves around a bachelor party that a group of men throw for their friend Rick Gassko (Hanks) on the eve of his wedding and whether he can remain faithful to his fiancée Debbie (Kitaen).

== Plot ==
Party animal Rick Gassko, who makes his living as a Catholic-school bus driver and an artist, decides to settle down and marry his girlfriend, Debbie Thompson. After learning the news of the engagement, Rick's shocked friends, led by Jay, decide to throw him an epic bachelor party. The bride's wealthy, conservative parents are unhappy with her decision, and her father enlists the help of Debbie's ex-boyfriend Cole to sabotage her relationship with Rick and win her back.

While Debbie worries and goes off to a bridal shower thrown by her friends, Rick heads to the bachelor party, which takes place in a lavish, spacious hotel suite, and promises to remain faithful. Both events start off on the wrong foot because of Cole's meddling. As the bachelor party starts to heat up, Debbie and the girls decide to get even with Rick and his friends by having a party of their own. Both parties eventually collide, leading to Debbie accusing Rick of infidelity.

The bachelor party becomes a wild, drunken orgy and the hotel room is trashed, which infuriates the hotel's frustrated manager. Adding to the confusion is Rick's friend Brad, who has become despondent over the breakup of his marriage and botches several suicide attempts.

Rick convinces Debbie of his love and faithfulness just as the party is raided by the police. In the ensuing melee, Rick and Debbie become separated and Cole kidnaps Debbie. Rick and his friends chase after them. The chase culminates in a showdown between Rick and Cole in a 36-screen movie theater, with a fist fight taking place in synchronization with a similar fight being shown in a 3D film projected behind them; the audience believes that the real fight is an extraordinary 3D effect. Rick wins the fight and is reunited with Debbie.

After the wedding, Rick and Debbie are driven to the airport for their honeymoon in Rick's school bus, which is driven by a laughing Brad.

== Cast ==
- Tom Hanks as Richard Ernesto "Rick" Gassko
- Tawny Kitaen as Deborah Julie "Debbie" Thompson
- Adrian Zmed as Jay O'Neill
- George Grizzard as Ed Thompson
- Barbara Stuart as Mrs. Thompson
- Robert Prescott as Cole Whittier
- William Tepper as Dr. Stanley "Stan" Gassko
- Wendie Jo Sperber as Dr. Tina Gassko
- Barry Diamond as Rudy
- Martina Finch as Phoebe
- Deborah Harmon as Ilene
- Tracy Smith as Bobbi
- Bradford Bancroft as Brad
- Gary Grossman as Gary
- Michael Dudikoff as Ryko
- Ji-Tu Cumbuka as Alley Pimp
- Kenneth Kimmins as Parkview Hotel Manager
- Rosanne Katon and Dani Douthette as Bridal Shower Hookers
- Christopher Morley as She-Tim, Cross-Dresser
- Brett Baxter Clark as Nick (credited as Brett Clark)
- Monique Gabrielle as Tracey
- Angela Aames as Mrs. Klupner
- Hugh McPhillips as Father O'Donnell
- Pat Proft and Rebecca Perle as Screaming Newlyweds in Car

=== Casting ===
Jim Carrey, Tim Robbins, and Howie Mandel were all considered for the role of Rick Gassko.

== Production ==
The idea for the film came from an actual bachelor party thrown by producer Ron Moler and a group of friends for fellow producer Bob Israel. Several members of the film's cast and crew were at that party when the idea began to take shape.

The film was made in the wake of the success of Police Academy.

== Music ==
Bachelor Party: Original Soundtrack

Soundtrack album by Various Artists
- Released: June 1984
- Genre: New wave
- Length: 30:44
- Labels: I.R.S. (remastered and re-released in 2003 by Superfecta Recordings)

The soundtrack album from Bachelor Party was released in 1984.

Side one

1. "American Beat '84 (Theme for Bachelor Party)" – The Fleshtones (3:28)
2. "Something Isn't Right" – Oingo Boingo (3:42)
3. "Crazy Over You" – Jools Holland (2:59)
4. "Little Demon" – Adrian Zmed (3:21)
5. "Windout" – R.E.M. (1:58)

Side two

1. "Bachelor Party" – Oingo Boingo (3:49)
2. "What Kind of Hell" – The Alarm (2:43)
3. "Alley Oop" – Darlene Love (3:57)
4. "Why Do Good Girls Like Bad Boys?" – Angel and the Reruns (2:10)
5. "Dream of the West" – Yip Yip Coyote (3:07)

The film also features these songs:

- "Dance Hall Days" – Wang Chung
- "Rehumanize Yourself" – The Police
- "Nature Took Over" – Angel and the Reruns
- "Gotta Give a Little Love" – Timmy Thomas
- "Prepare to Energize" – Torch Song
- "Who Do You Want to Be" – Oingo Boingo
- "Hall of Fame" – The Fleshtones

== Reception ==
Reviews for Bachelor Party were mixed, holding a rating of 54% on Rotten Tomatoes based on 28 reviews. While some critics appreciated the humor, others found it to be vulgar and gratuitous. Film critics Roger Ebert and Janet Maslin both recommended the film, but had reservations about certain aspects, calling it "sophomoric" and "not a great film."

In his Los Angeles Times review, film critic Kevin Thomas praised Hanks as "likable, spontaneous zany" but felt that the film was 15 minutes too long: "That extra 15 minutes allows for just enough repetition (and just enough lingering over as much outrageous sexual connotation that an R rating permits) to let heavy-handed tastelessness creep in and dampen the fun."

== Sequel ==
Twenty-four years after Bachelor Party was released, 20th Century Fox Home Entertainment produced a straight-to-DVD sequel (in name only) called Bachelor Party 2: The Last Temptation.
