= Fast Friends (film) =

- Genre: Drama
- Written by: Sandra Harmon
- Directed by: Steven Hilliard Stern
- Starring: Carrie Snodgress; Dick Shawn; Edie Adams; Mackenzie Phillips; Sumi Haru; Michael Parks; David Letterman; Pat Proft; Vivian Blaine; Elayne Heilveil
- Composer: Don Peake
- Country of origin: United States
- Original language: English

Production
- Producer: Sandra Harmon
- Cinematography: Howard Schwartz (as Howard R. Schwartz)
- Editor: Kurt Hirschler
- Running time: 100 minutes
- Production companies: Green/Epstein Productions; Sandra Harmon Productions; Columbia Pictures Television

Original release
- Network: NBC
- Release: March 19, 1979

Fast Friends is a 1979 American drama television film starring Carrie Snodgress, Michael Parks, Dick Shawn Edie Adams, Mackenzie Phillips, Vivian Blaine, Elayne Heilveil and Sumi Haru.

The writer and producer of Fast Friends, Sandra Harmon, was previously a writer for The Dick Cavett Show.

== Plot ==
A divorced young woman lands a staff job on a television talk show as she struggles to invent a new life for herself and her son. She makes friends with the show's head writer and has to deal with the egomaniacal host of the show who values loyalty above ability.

== Cast ==
- Carrie Snodgress as Diana Hayward
- Dick Shawn as Deke Edwards
- Edie Adams as Connie Burton
- Jed Allan as Bernie
- Vivian Blaine as Sylvia
- Denise DuBarry as Marcy
- Tom Hallick as Pat McKenna
- Elayne Heilveil as Amy
- David Letterman as Matt Morgan
- Michael Parks as David York
- Susan Heldfond as Jenny Roman
- Mackenzie Phillips as Susan
- Meeno Peluce as Josh Roman
- Bruce Stidham as Alan Berkowitz
- Pat Proft as Bill Owens
- Joseph Hardin as Johnny
- Mitch Hara as Terry
- Russ Marin as Mac
- Michael Payne as Sam
- Roscoe Born as Ben Lakeman
- Joel Lawrence as Cue Card Man
- Sumi Haru as TV Reporter
- Moe Di Sesso as Mr. Doodles
- Lonnie Bradford as Man
- Joella Deffenbaugh as Woman
- J.D. Hinton as Donnie Devlin(as James David Hinton)
