= The Rape of Richard Beck =

1985 American TV film

- Genre: Drama
- Written by: James G. Hirsch
- Directed by: Karen Arthur
- Starring: Richard Crenna; George Dzundza; Meredith Baxter; Pat Hingle; Frances Lee McCain; Cotter Smith; Joanna Kerns
- Music by: Peter Bernstein
- Country of origin: United States
- Original language: English

Production
- Executive producers: James S. Henerson; James G. Hirsch
- Producer: Robert Papazian
- Cinematography: Tom Neuwirth
- Editors: Maurie Beck; Millie Moore
- Running time: 100 minutes
- Production company: Robert Papazian Productions

Original release
- Network: ABC
- Release: May 27, 1985

The Rape of Richard Beck (also known as Deadly Justice) is a 1985 American television film. It was written by James G. Hirsch and directed by Karen Arthur, and stars Richard Crenna, Pat Hingle, Frances Lee McCain, and Joanna Kerns. Jason Bernard, Meredith Baxter, George Dzundza, and Troy Evans appear in supporting roles. The film premiered on ABC on May 27, 1985. For his performance, Crenna won a Primetime Emmy Award for Outstanding Lead Actor - Miniseries or a Movie.

== Plot ==
Based in Seattle, Richard Beck is a veteran police detective who has little sympathy for sex crime victims, believing that they are "asking for it". When he lets an accused rapist go free in exchange for information on a murder suspect, he is punished by being assigned to the Sex Crimes unit, where he must work alongside counselor Barbara McKee. Beck continues to disregard the seriousness of the job until he is raped by two male suspects, after which he starts to question his own attitudes about violence, women, and masculinity.

== Cast ==
- Richard Crenna as Richard Beck
- George Dzundza as Blastig
- Meredith Baxter as Barbara McKee
- Pat Hingle as Chappy Beck
- Frances Lee McCain as Caroline Beck
- Cotter Smith as Lt. Hugo
- Joanna Kerns as Anita Parrish
- Mark Dickison as Eric Gibbs
- Jason Bernard as Sgt. Wally Rydell
- Nicholas Worth as Ray
- M. C. Gainey as Sonny
- Stanley Kamel as Dr. Greenberg

== Awards and nominations ==
Richard Crenna won a Primetime Emmy Award for Outstanding Lead Actor in a Limited Series or a Special. Crenna's performance was also nominated for a Golden Globe Award for Best Performance by an Actor in a Mini-Series or Motion Picture Made for TV. The film won an Eddie Award for Best Edited Television Special for Millie Moore and Maurie Beck.
