= Pat Proft =

American comedy writer, actor, and director

- Born: April 1947 (age 79); Columbia Heights, Minnesota, U.S.
- Occupations: Screenwriter film producer
- Years active: 1973 – present
- Spouse: Karen Philipp

Pat Proft (born 1947) is an American comedy writer, actor, and director. Born in Minnesota in 1947, Proft began his career at Dudley Riggs' Brave New Workshop in Minneapolis in the mid-1960s. He went on to perform as a one-man comedy act in the late 1960s. In 1972, Proft began working at The Comedy Store in Hollywood which led to work in television and film writing for the Smothers Brothers and Zucker, Abrahams and Zucker.

Of the many feature films Proft has written, Wrongfully Accused is the only one he also directed. It was released in 1998.

Proft continued to work with David Zucker, and in 2013 announced he was working on a parody film with Zucker involving the Jason Bourne and Mission: Impossible series.

== Biography ==
Proft was born in 1947 in Minnesota. Proft attended Columbia Heights High School where his English teacher Stuart J. Anderson encouraged Proft to develop his talent. Proft would later perform at the Chanhassen Dinner Theatre's stage, acting in musicals even though Proft felt that he "can't sing or dance." In 1972, Proft moved to Hollywood where he began working at The Comedy Store. Jerry and David Zucker saw some of Proft's work at the Comedy Store and would later invite him to join them at Kentucky Fried Theater. Proft received a special thanks message in the credits of the film Airplane! (1980).

=== Television career ===
In his early career, Proft wrote for several television and comedy variety shows. Proft was a regular on The Burns and Schreiber Comedy Hour that lasted from June to September 1973. In 1975, Proft would also appear as a regular on Joey & Dad, a variety show featuring Joey Heatherton and her father.

Proft would work as a screenwriter on the situation comedy show When Things Were Rotten developed by Mel Brooks and screened between September and December 1975. The series, a satire on the Robin Hood story, was well received by critics but was cancelled in 1975 due to low ratings. In 1976, Proft was writing for Van Dyke and Company, a variety show that was nominated for a Daytime Emmy Award in 1977.

=== Film career ===
In 1997, the film Mr. Magoo was released, written by Proft and Tom Sherohman. The film was based on the UPA cartoon series from the 1950s and 1960s about a nearsighted eccentric. The film received poor reviews. Variety stated that both Proft and Sherohman "have labored mightily to cobble together a plot capable of stretching to feature length the one-joke premise of the six-minute cartoons."

In 1998, Proft's directorial debut titled Wrongfully Accused was released. The film is a parody of the thriller genre exemplified by The Fugitive (1993). In the same year, Proft announced a parody of the Dirty Harry film series about an American police officer who heads to England to extradite a criminal without much success and a script titled Deep Titanic: Armageddon and Titanic, Too: It Missed the Iceberg which he also wanted to direct. Titanic, Too: It Missed the Iceberg had actors Leslie Nielsen, Priscilla Presley and David Hasselhoff in talks for starring with a release date originally aimed for early 1999. CNN's film analyst Martin Grove stated the film was not likely to be made as two recent parody films Wrongfully Accused and Plump Fiction were not well received.

In 2013, Proft was working on a script with David Zucker titled Counter Intelligence. Proft described the film as a "Naked Gun take on the Mission Impossible and Bourne film series". Zucker would discuss in 2017 that he was working on a script for a fourth Naked Gun film with Proft. No project with Zucker has been made since Scary Movie V. In 2021, Proft was again working on a script for David Zucker titled The Star of Malta, a parody of film noir and heist films.

== Personal life ==
Proft is married to actress and singer Karen Philipp.

== Filmography ==
=== Feature credits ===
Year	Title	Director	Producer	Writer	Ref.
1984	Police Academy	No	No	Yes	
1984	Bachelor Party	No	No	Yes	
1985	Moving Violations	No	No	Yes	
1985	Real Genius	No	No	Yes	
1988	The Naked Gun: From the Files of Police Squad!	No	No	Yes	
1988	Lucky Stiff	No	Yes	Yes	
1991	The Naked Gun 2½: The Smell of Fear	No	No	Yes	
1991	Hot Shots!	No	Executive	Yes	
1992	Brain Donors	No	No	Yes	
1993	Hot Shots! Part Deux	No	Executive	Yes	
1994	Naked Gun 33 1/3: The Final Insult	No	No	Yes	
1996	High School High	No	No	Yes	
1997	Mr. Magoo	No	No	Yes	
1998	Wrongfully Accused	Yes	Yes	Yes	
2003	Scary Movie 3	No	No	Yes	
2006	Scary Movie 4	No	No	Yes	
2008	Bachelor Party 2: The Last Temptation	No	No	Yes	
2008	Mostly Ghostly	No	No	Yes	
2013	Scary Movie 5	No	No	Yes	
TBA	The Star of Malta	No	No	Yes	

=== Acting roles ===
Year	Title	Role	Ref.
1976	Tunnel Vision	Skipper	
1979	Fast Friends	Bill Owens	
1981	Modern Problems	Maitre d'	
1984	Bachelor Party	Screaming Man	

=== Television credits ===
- The Burns and Schreiber Comedy Hour (1973)
- The Smothers Brothers Show (1975)
- The Jim Stafford Show (1975)
- When Things Were Rotten (1975)
- Welcome Back, Kotter (1975)
- Van Dyke and Company (1976)
- 3 Girls 3 (1977)
- The Redd Foxx Comedy Hour (1977)
- Mary (1978)
- Ringo (1978)
- Star Wars Holiday Special (1978)
- Detective School (1979)
- Twilight Theater (1982)
- Police Squad! (1982)
- High School U.S.A. (1984)
- Super Dave's Spike-Tacular (2009)

== Bibliography ==
- Terrace, Vincent (February 26, 2013). Encyclopedia of Television Pilots, 1937-2012. McFarland & Company. ISBN 9781476602493.
- Brooks, Tim; Marsh, Earle F. (2009). The Complete Directory to Prime Time Network and Cable TV Shows, 1946-Present. Random House Publishing Group. ISBN 9780307483201.
- Terrace, Vincent (1985). Encyclopedia of Television Series, Pilots and Specials. VNR AG. ISBN 0918432618.
- Crick, Robert Alan (2002). The Big Screen Comedies of Mel Brooks. McFarland. ISBN 078644326X.
- Wesley, Hyatt (2006). Emmy Award Winning Nighttime Television Shows, 1948-2004. McFarland. ISBN 0786423293.
- Yoram Allon; Del Cullen; Hannah Patterson, eds. (2002). Contemporary North American Film Directors: A Wallflower Critical Guide. Wallflower Press. ISBN 1903364523.
