= Richard Crenna =

American actor (1926–2003)

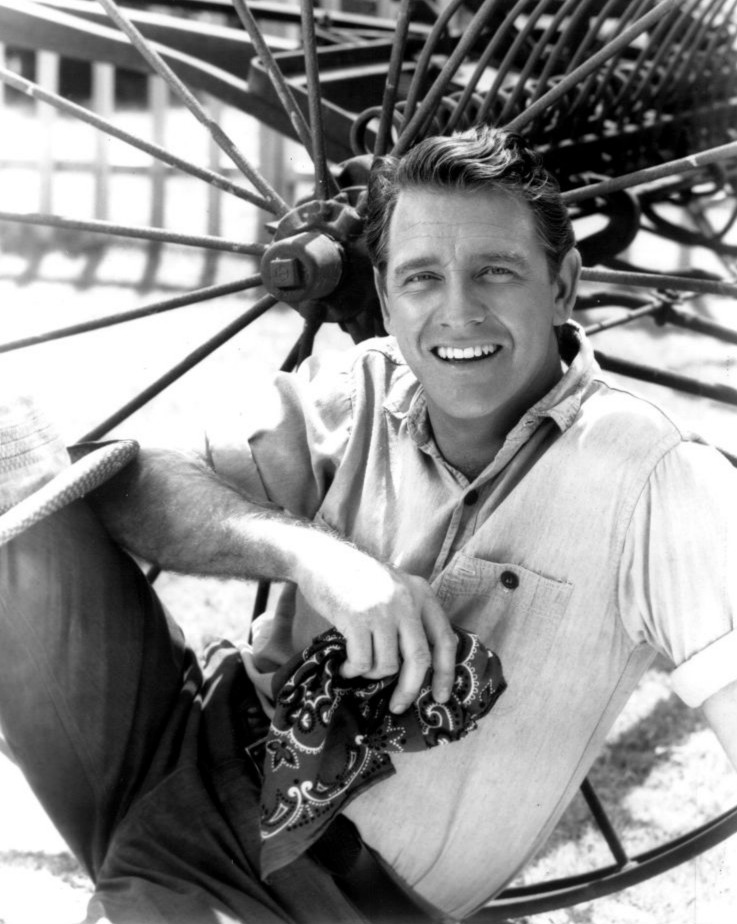
- Crenna in 1961
- Born: November 30, 1926; Los Angeles, California, U.S.
- Died: January 17, 2003 (aged 76); Los Angeles, California, U.S.
- Education: University of Southern California (BA)
- Occupations: Actor; director; producer
- Years active: 1937–2003
- Spouses: Joan Grisham (m. 1950; div. 1955) Penni Sweeney (m. 1959)
- Children: 3 (including Richard Anthony Crenna)
- Military career
- Allegiance: United States
- Branch: United States Army
- Service years: 1945–1946
- Rank: Corporal
- Conflicts: World War II
- Awards: American Campaign Medal; Asiatic–Pacific Campaign Medal; European–African–Middle Eastern Campaign Medal; World War II Victory Medal

Richard Donald Crenna (November 30, 1926 – January 17, 2003) was an American actor and television director.

Crenna starred in such motion pictures as Made in Paris (1966), The Sand Pebbles (1966), Marooned (1969), Breakheart Pass (1975), The Evil (1978), The Flamingo Kid (1984), Summer Rental (1985) and Sabrina (1995). His first success came on radio in 1948 as high school student Walter Denton co-starring with Eve Arden and Gale Gordon in the series Our Miss Brooks. Crenna continued with the comedy in its 1952 move into television. He also starred as Luke McCoy in the television series The Real McCoys (1957–1963). In 1985, he won the Primetime Emmy Award for Outstanding Lead Actor in a Limited or Anthology Series or Movie for his portrayal of the title role in The Rape of Richard Beck (1985). He gained further notoriety for his role as Colonel Sam Trautman in the first three Rambo films (1982–1988).

== Early life ==
Crenna was born November 30, 1926, in Los Angeles, the only child of Edith Josephine (née Pollette), who was a hotel manager in Los Angeles, and Domenick Anthony Crenna, a pharmacist. His parents were both of Italian descent. Crenna attended Virgil Junior High School, followed by Belmont Senior High School in Los Angeles, from which he graduated in 1944. He served in the United States Army during World War II, entering the Army in February 1945 and serving until August 1946.

After his Army service, Crenna attended the University of Southern California (USC), where he earned a Bachelor of Arts degree in English literature, and he was a member of Kappa Sigma fraternity.

== Acting career ==
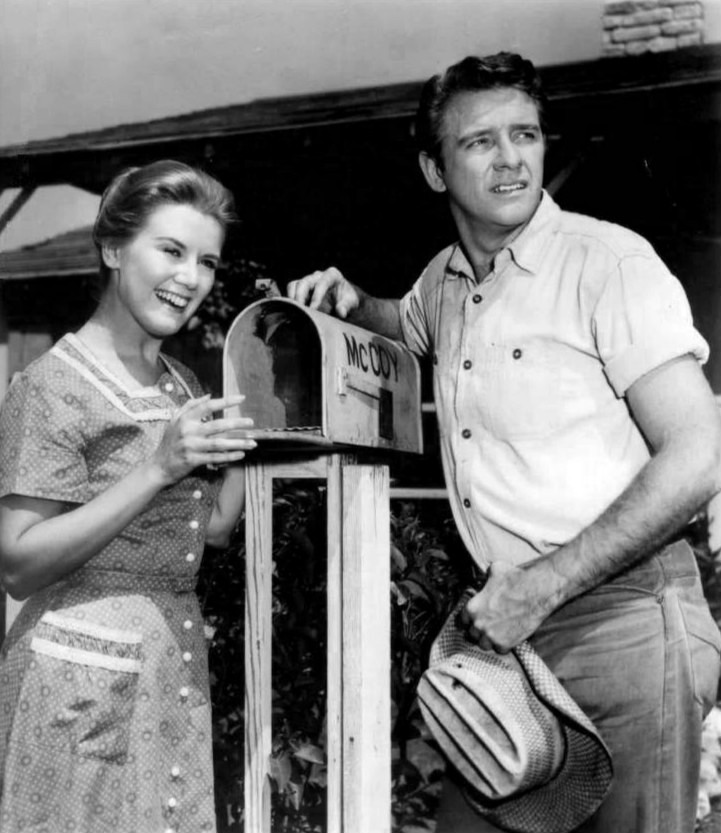
Crenna and Kathleen Nolan in The Real McCoys, 1960

=== Radio years ===
Crenna got his acting start on radio. In 1937, he had gained his first role, that of "the kid who did everything wrong" on Boy Scout Jamboree, a show on which he continued to appear occasionally in numerous roles until 1948. In the following year, he started playing Walter "Bronco" Thompson on The Great Gildersleeve, a role he played until 1954. He also originated the role of geeky Walter Denton on the radio comedy Our Miss Brooks alongside Eve Arden and Gale Gordon in 1948, and followed that role when the series moved to television in 1952. He remained in that role until 1957. He appeared as a delivery boy in My Favorite Husband (episode "Liz Cooks Dinner for 12"), was Oogie Pringle on A Date With Judy (episode "The Competitive Diet", among several other episodes of the show) and as a teenager on The George Burns and Gracie Allen Show (episode "Watching the Neighbor's Daughter").

=== Early television years ===
Crenna played Walter Denton on radio's Our Miss Brooks, remaining with the cast when it moved into television in 1952. He remained with the show until a 1955 change moved Miss Brooks to a grade school. He guest-starred on the I Love Lucy episode "The Young Fans", with Janet Waldo and on the 1955–56 anthology series Frontier, in the lead role of the episode titled "The Ten Days of John Leslie". In 1955, he was the guest star on The Millionaire in the episode "The Ralph McKnight Story".

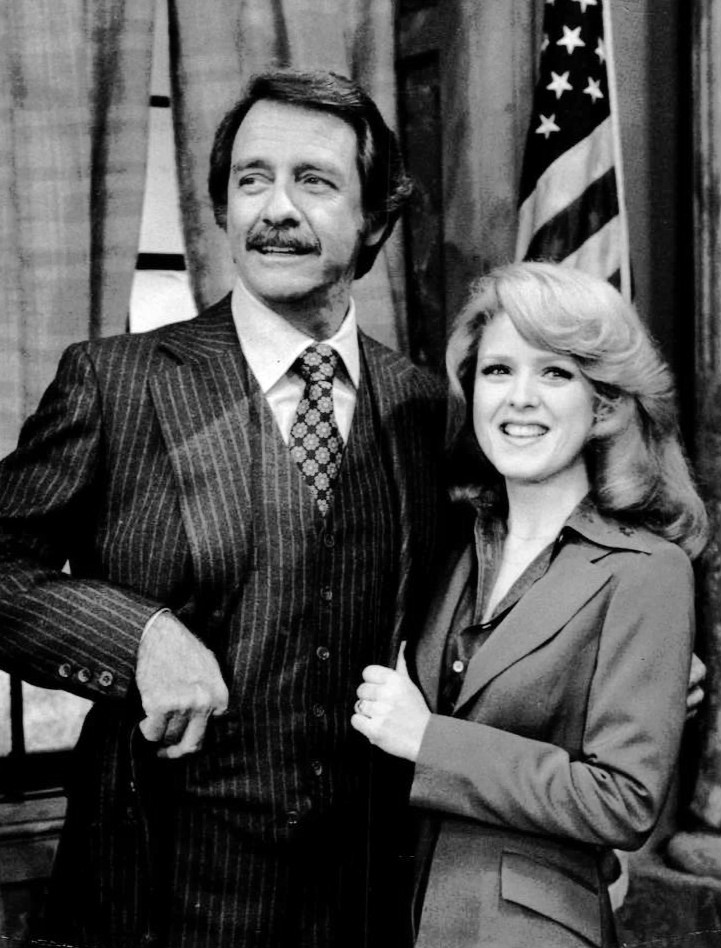
Crenna and Bernadette Peters in All's Fair, 1976

Crenna appeared in 1956 on the television series Father Knows Best in the episode "The Promising Young Man" as a young man named Woody. In 1957, he played a bank robber on Cheyenne (season 2, episode 19).

After Our Miss Brooks was canceled in 1957, Crenna joined the cast of the comedy series The Real McCoys as Luke McCoy; his co-star was Walter Brennan, who played Grandpa Amos McCoy. Crenna ultimately became one of the series's four directors during its six-year run (1957–1963).

=== 1960s–1970s ===
Credited as Dick Crenna, he directed eight episodes of The Andy Griffith Show during its 1963–1964 season, including "Opie the Birdman," "The Sermon for Today," and the Gomer Pyle-instigated "Citizen's Arrest." Crenna also directed "Henhouse," a 1977 episode of Lou Grant.

Crenna portrayed California state senator James Slattery in the series Slattery's People (1964–1965). For his acting in this series, he was twice nominated for an Emmy Award with slightly different names: for Outstanding Individual Achievements in Entertainment and for Outstanding Continued Performance by an Actor in a Leading Role in a Dramatic Series, both in 1965. Crenna was nominated for a Golden Globe Award for Best TV Star – Male for this same role in 1965. In 1966, Crenna played beside Steve McQueen as an ill-fated captain of an American gunboat in 1920s China in The Sand Pebbles. He co-starred with Audrey Hepburn in the 1967 thriller Wait Until Dark.

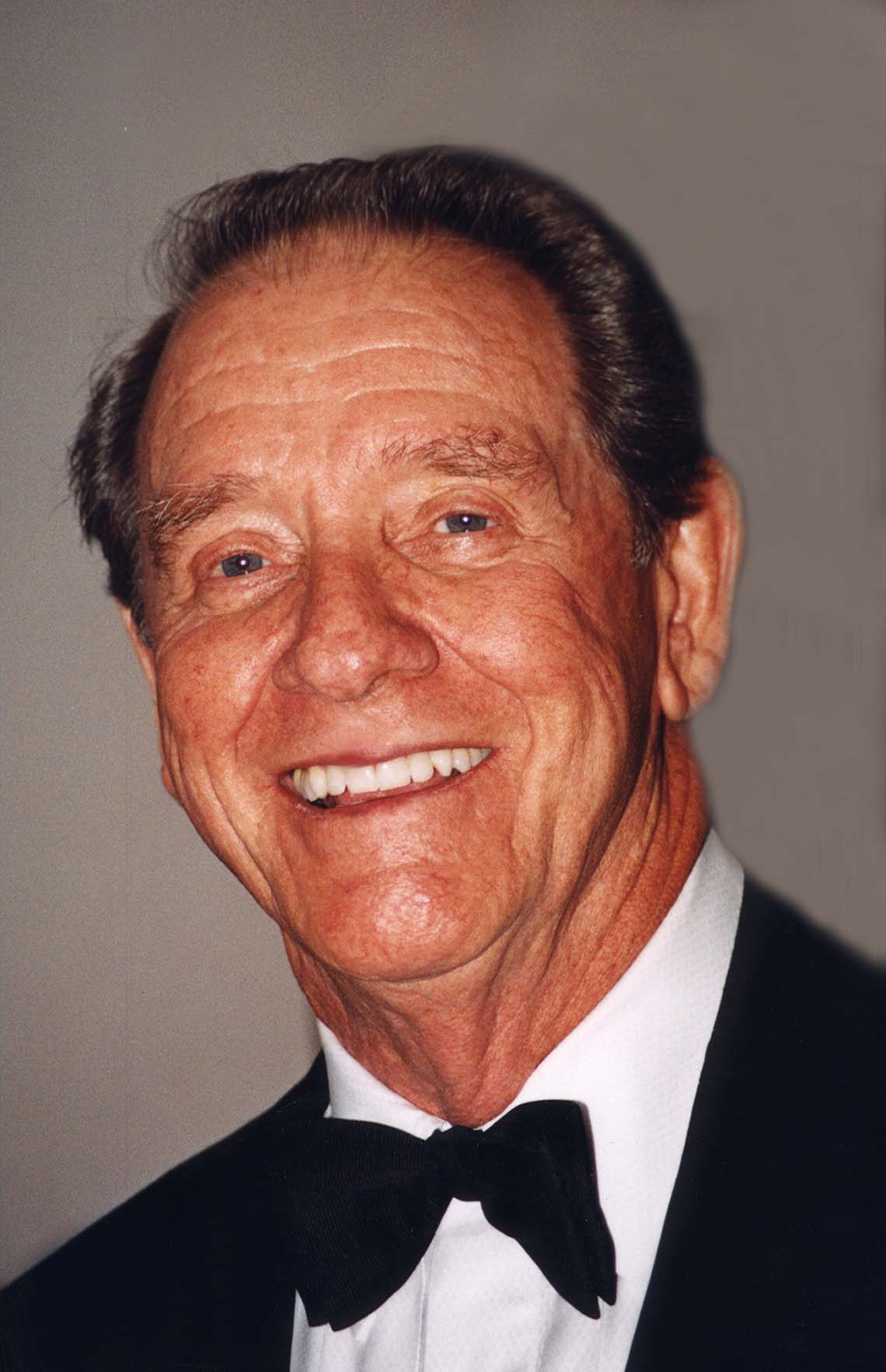
Crenna in 1998

During the 1970s, Crenna continued acting in Western dramas such as The Deserter, Catlow, The Man Called Noon, and Breakheart Pass. He made a notable performance in Jean-Pierre Melville's final film Un Flic in 1972. In 1976, Crenna returned to weekly network television in the sitcom All's Fair, a political satire co-starring Bernadette Peters. Despite high expectations and good critical reviews, it lasted just a single season. The 1978 miniseries Centennial, based on James A. Michener's historical novel of the same name saw Crenna in the role of deranged religious fanatic Colonel Frank Skimmerhorn, who ordered the 1864 massacre of Colorado American Indians.

=== 1980s–early 2000s ===
In 1981, he played Kathleen Turner's doomed husband in Lawrence Kasdan's Body Heat. Crenna won an Emmy Award and a Golden Globe Award for Best Performance by an Actor in a Mini-Series or Motion Picture Made for Television nomination for his performance in the title role of the 1985 film The Rape of Richard Beck.

Crenna played John Rambo's ex-commanding officer Colonel Sam Trautman, in the first three Rambo films, a role for which he was hired after Kirk Douglas left the production a day into filming. Trautman became the veteran actor's most famous role; his performance received wide critical praise. He also spoofed the character in Hot Shots! Part Deux in 1993.

Crenna starred as NYPD lieutenant of detectives Frank Janek in a series of seven popular made-for-television films, beginning in 1988 and ending in 1994. The character of Janek had originally appeared in a series of novels by William Bayer.

In 2001, Crenna played US President Ronald Reagan in the Showtime film The Day Reagan Was Shot, a fictionalised account of the attempted assassination of Reagan in 1981.

== Legacy ==
Crenna was awarded a star on the Hollywood Walk of Fame at 6714 Hollywood Boulevard.

== Illness and death ==
Crenna died of heart failure at age 76 on January 17, 2003, in Los Angeles. At the time of his death, he also had pancreatic cancer.

== Filmography ==
=== Film ===
Year	Title	Role	Notes
1950	Let's Dance	Bit Part	Uncredited
1951	Starlift	Movie Theater Usher	Uncredited
1952	Red Skies of Montana	Noxon	Uncredited
1952	The Pride of St. Louis	Paul Dean	
1952	It Grows on Trees	Ralph Bowen	
1956	Over-Exposed	Russell Bassett	
1956	Our Miss Brooks	Walter Denton	
1965	John Goldfarb, Please Come Home!	John Goldfarb	
1966	Made in Paris	Herb Stone	
1966	The Sand Pebbles	Captain Collins	
1967	Wait Until Dark	Mike Talman	
1968	Star!	Richard Aldrich	
1969	Midas Run	Mike Warden	
1969	Marooned	Jim Pruett	
1971	Doctors' Wives	Dr. Peter Brennan	
1971	The Deserter	Major Wade Brown	
1971	Red Sky at Morning	Frank Arnold	
1971	Catlow	Marshal Ben Cowan	
1972	Un flic	Simon	
1973	The Man Called Noon	Noon	
1973	Jonathan Livingston Seagull	Father (voice)	
1975	Breakheart Pass	Governor Richard Fairchild	
1978	Devil Dog: The Hound of Hell	Mike Barry	
1978	The Evil	C.J. Arnold	
1979	Stone Cold Dead	Sergeant Boyd	
1979	Wild Horse Hank	Pace Bradford	
1980	Death Ship	Trevor Marshall	
1980	Joshua's World	Dr. Joshua Torrance	
1981	Body Heat	Edmund Walker	
1982	First Blood	Colonel Samuel R. "Sam" Trautman	
1983	Table for Five	Mitchell	
1984	The Flamingo Kid	Phil Brody	Nominated—Golden Globe Award for Best Supporting Actor – Motion Picture
1985	Rambo: First Blood Part II	Colonel Samuel R. "Sam" Trautman	
1985	Summer Rental	Al Pellet	
1988	Rambo III	Colonel Samuel R. "Sam" Trautman	
1989	Leviathan	Dr. Glen "Doc" Thompson	
1993	Hot Shots! Part Deux	Colonel Denton Walters	
1995	A Pyromaniac's Love Story	Tom Lumpke	Uncredited
1995	Jade	Governor Lew Edwards	
1995	Sabrina	Patrick Tyson	
1998	Wrongfully Accused	Lieutenant Fergus Falls	
1998	Legendary Lighthouses	Narrator	
2008	Rambo	Colonel Samuel R. "Sam" Trautman	Archival footage; uncredited
2019	Rambo: Last Blood	Colonel Samuel R. "Sam" Trautman	Archival footage; uncredited

=== Television ===
Year	Title	Role	Notes
1952	I Love Lucy	Arthur Morton	episode: "The Young Fans"
1952–1955	Our Miss Brooks	Walter Denton	94 episodes
1955	The Millionaire	Ralph McKnight	episode: "The Ralph McKnight Story"
1956	Frontier	John Leslie	episode: "The 10 Days of John Leslie"
1956	Medic	Donny	episode: "Don't Count the Stars"
1956	Father Knows Best	Elwood Seastrom	episode: "The Promising Young Man"
1956–1958	Matinee Theatre	Sergeant James	3 episodes
1957	The Silent Service	Lieutenant Commander L. L. "Jeff" Davis	episode: "The U.S.S. Pampanito Story"
1957	Cheyenne	"Curley" Galway	episode: "Hard Bargain"
1957–1963	The Real McCoys	Luke McCoy	225 episodes nominated—Primetime Emmy Award for Outstanding Supporting Actor in a Comedy Series (1959)
1960	The Deputy	Andy Willis	episode: "A Time to Sow"
1963	Kraft Suspense Theatre	Edward Smalley	episode: "The Long, Lost Life of Edward Smalley"
1964–1965	Slattery's People	James Slattery	36 episodes nominated—Golden Globe Award for Best Actor – Television Series Drama (1965) nominated—Primetime Emmy Award for Outstanding Individual Achievements in Entertainment (1965) nominated—Primetime Emmy Award for Outstanding Lead Actor in a Drama Series (1966)
1971	Thief	Neal Wilkinson	television film
1971–1972	Rowan & Martin's Laugh-In	Guest Performer	3 episodes
1972	Footsteps	Paddy O'Connor	television film
1973	Double Indemnity	Walter Neff	television film
1974	Nightmare	Howard Faloon	television film
1974	Shootout in a One-Dog Town	Zack Wells	television film
1974	Double Solitaire		television film
1974	Honky Tonk	"Candy" Johnson	television film
1975	A Girl Named Sooner	R.J. "Mac" McHenry	television film
1976–1977	All's Fair	Richard C. Barrington	24 episodes
1977	The War Between the Tates	Professor Brian Tate	television film
1978	Devil Dog: The Hound of Hell	Mike Barry	television film
1978	First, You Cry	David Towers	television film
1978	A Fire in the Sky	Jason Voight	television film
1978–1979	Centennial	Colonel Frank Skimmerhorn	television miniseries
1979	Mayflower: The Pilgrims' Adventure	William Brewster	television film
1979	Better Late Than Never	The Director	television film
1980	Fugitive Family	Brian Roberts / Matthews	television film
1981	The Ordeal of Bill Carney	Mason Rose	television film
1981	Daniel Boone	voice	television film
1981	Look at Us	Host	
1982	The Day the Bubble Burst	Jesse Livermore	television film
1982–1983	It Takes Two	Dr. Sam Quinn	22 episodes
1984	Squaring the Circle	The Narrator	television film
1984	London and Davis in New York	John Greyson	television film
1984	Passions	Richard Kennerly	television film
1985	The Rape of Richard Beck	Richard Beck	television film Primetime Emmy Award for Outstanding Lead Actor in a Limited Series or Movie nominated—Golden Globe Award for Best Actor – Miniseries or Television Film
1985	Doubletake	Frank Janek	television miniseries
1986	A Case of Deadly Force	Lawrence O'Donnell Sr.	television film
1986	On Wings of Eagles	H. Ross Perot	television miniseries
1986	The High Price of Passion	Bill Douglas	television film
1987	Police Story: The Freeway Killings	Deputy Chief Bob Devers	television film
1987	Kids Like These	Bob Goodman	television film
1987	Plaza Suite	Roy Hubley	television film
1988	Internal Affairs	Frank Janek	television film
1989	The Case of the Hillside Stranglers	Sergeant Bob Grogan	television film
1989	Stuck with Each Other	Bert Medwick	television film
1990	Murder in Black and White	Frank Janek	television film
1990	Montana	Hoyce Guthrie	television film
1990	Last Flight Out	Dan Hood	television film
1990	Murder Times Seven	Frank Janek	television film
1991	And the Sea Will Tell	Vincent Bugliosi	television film
1991–1992	Pros and Cons	Mitch O'Hannon	12 episodes
1992	Intruders	Dr. Neil Chase	television miniseries
1992	Terror on Track 9	Detective Frank Janek	television film
1993	A Place to Be Loved	George Russ	television film
1994	The Forget-Me-Not Murders	Frank Janek	television film
1994	Jonathan Stone: Threat of Innocence	Jonathan Stone	television film
1994	Janek: The Silent Betrayal	Lieutenant Frank Janek	television film
1995	In the Name of Love: A Texas Tragedy	Lucas Constable Sr.	television film
1995–1998	JAG	Lieutenant Harmon Rabb Sr.	4 episodes
1996	Race Against Time: The Search for Sarah	John Porter	television film
1996	Nova	Narrator	Episode: B-29: Frozen in Time
1996	Texas Graces	Virgil Grace	television film
1997	20,000 Leagues Under the Sea	Professor Aronnax	television film
1997	Deep Family Secrets	Clay Chadway	television film
1997	Heart Full of Rain	Arliss Dockett	television film
1997	Cold Case	Host	television film
1999	To Serve and Protect	Howard Carr	television film
1999	The Man Who Makes Things Happen: David L. Wolper	Narrator	television film
1999	Chicago Hope	Dr. Martin Rockwell	episode: "Teacher's Pet"
2000	Murder, She Wrote: A Story to Die For	Warren Pierce	television film
2000	By Dawn's Early Light	Ben Maxwell	television film
2000–2003	Judging Amy	Jared Duff	13 episodes
2001	The Day Reagan Was Shot	Ronald Reagan	television film
2003	Out of the Ashes	Jake Smith	television film

=== Video games ===
Year	Title	Role	Notes
2014	Rambo: The Video Game	Colonel Samuel "Sam" Trautman	character likeness / uncredited

== Awards and nominations ==
Year	Association	Category	Nominated work	Result
1959	Primetime Emmy Awards	Outstanding Supporting Actor in a Comedy Series	The Real McCoys	Nominated
1965	Golden Globe Awards	Best Actor – Television Series Drama	Slattery's People	Nominated
1965	Primetime Emmy Awards	Outstanding Individual Achievements in Entertainment	Slattery's People	Nominated
1966	Primetime Emmy Awards	Outstanding Lead Actor in a Drama Series	Slattery's People	Nominated
1984	Golden Globe Awards	Best Supporting Actor – Motion Picture	The Flamingo Kid	Nominated
1985	Golden Globe Awards	Best Actor – Miniseries or Television Film	The Rape of Richard Beck	Nominated
1985	Primetime Emmy Awards	Outstanding Lead Actor in a Limited Series or Movie	The Rape of Richard Beck	Won

== Military awards ==

American Campaign Medal
Asiatic-Pacific Campaign Medal	European-African-Middle Eastern Campaign Medal	World War II Victory Medal
