= Jerry Haleva =

American actor, Saddam Hussein doppelgänger

- Born: May 1946 (age 80)
- Occupations: Actor, political lobbyist
- Years active: 1991–2002 (actor)

Jerome Michael Haleva (born May 1946) is an American actor and political lobbyist. He gained fame as an actor as a doppelgänger of Saddam Hussein due to his physical resemblance to the late Iraqi leader, with all of his film roles having him portraying Hussein.

== Biography ==
Jerry Haleva, a Sephardic Jew whose grandparents were from Turkey. In 1973, he was an adviser to a legislative committee investigating prison conditions in California. He served in the California Senate in 1977 as chief of staff for William Campbell. Haleva was nicknamed the "41st Senator" for "his aggressive style and legislative adroitness". Haleva was thrice noted by the Fair Political Practices Commission for potential mishandling of funds.

Both Haleva and Campbell were briefly investigated following the BRISPEC sting operation for possible connections to Paul Carpenter, who had been connected to racketeering activities. They were mentioned in a tapped phone conversation by Carpenter's aide John Shahabian in August 1986. Campbell was described as "'available' to receive a cut of the contribution money in return for a potential vote on a bill" while Haleva was said to be a potential obstacle since he "will want a cut", telling an undercover FBI agent posing as a potential donor that if Haleva found out, they would "end up paying Jerry too. He’s famous for it". The FBI ultimately did not press charges against either Haleva or Campbell.

In 1989, a colleague of Haleva distributed a photo of the then-Iraqi leader Saddam Hussein among his co-workers with the text "Now we know what Haleva does on his weekends". A few years later, Haleva contacted Ron Smith, who represented doppelgängers in the film industry, and Smith had a small role for Haleva in the feature film Hot Shots! (1991), followed by a more prominent role in its sequel, Hot Shots! Part Deux (1993). Haleva played Hussein in half a dozen films. Besides the Hot Shots! movies and The Big Lebowski, he appeared in a few other films and also appeared in commercials (including for Nintendo).

In the spring of 2003, when Iraq was invaded, he decided to stop working as Hussein's doppelgänger. In January 2004 he came back to this decision and said in an interview that he was interested in continuing his acting career.

As of 2016, he was a contract lobbyist (Sergeant Major Associates) and lived in Sacramento, California.

== Filmography ==
Year	Film	Role	Notes
1991	Hot Shots!	Saddam Hussein	
1993	Hot Shots! Part Deux	Saddam Hussein	
1998	The Big Lebowski	Saddam	
1998	Jane Austen's Mafia!	Saddam Hussein	
2002	The First $20 Million Is Always the Hardest	Hologram Saddam	
2002	Live from Baghdad	Saddam Hussein	Television Film
