= Bob Israel (film producer) =

Bob Israel is a Hollywood film producer, story writer, Broadway theater producer, and philanthropist. His story was turned into the 1984 film Bachelor Party, starring Tom Hanks, and he was a co-producer of the film Ace Ventura: Pet Detective, starring Jim Carrey.

As the co-founder of Aspect Ratio, and later Workshop Creative, Israel has worked with film studios to create teasers and trailers for their movies. Israel co-produced a musical theater version of the movie The Flamingo Kid, which played in a limited run in Hartford, Connecticut in 2019, and is apparently slated for a Broadway effort.

Bob was the recipient of the 2023 Clio Entertainment Lifetime Achievement Award.
