= Leslie Nielsen filmography =

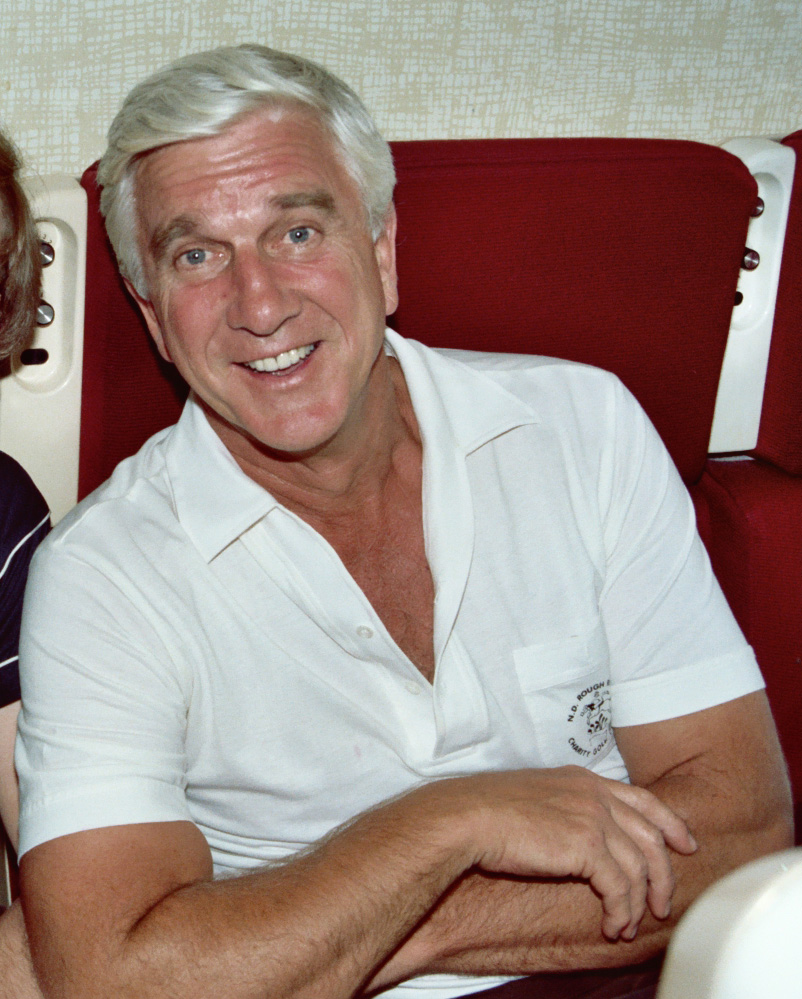
- Nielsen in 1982
- Film: 115
- Television series: 66
- Others: 5

The following is the complete filmography of Canadian actor Leslie Nielsen.

== Films ==
| Year | Film | Role | Other notes |
|---|---|---|---|
| 1955 | The Battle of Gettysburg | Narrator | |
| 1956 | Ransom! | Charlie Telfer | Film debut, as an actor |
| 1956 | Forbidden Planet | Commander John J. Adams | First starring role |
| 1956 | The Vagabond King | Thibault | |
| 1956 | The Opposite Sex | Steve Hilliard | |
| 1957 | Hot Summer Night | William Joel Partain | |
| 1957 | Tammy and the Bachelor | Peter Brent | |
| 1958 | The Sheepman | Colonel Stephen Bedford / Johnny Bledsoe | |
| 1964 | Night Train to Paris | Alan Holiday | |
| 1964 | See How They Run | Elliot Green | First television movie |
| 1965 | Harlow | Richard Manley | |
| 1965 | Dark Intruder | Brett Kingsford | |
| 1966 | The Plainsman | Colonel George Armstrong Custer | |
| 1966 | Beau Geste | Lieutenant De Ruse | |
| 1967 | Code Name: Heraclitus | Fryer | |
| 1967 | Gunfight in Abilene | Grant Evers | |
| 1967 | The Reluctant Astronaut | Major Fred Gifford | |
| 1967 | Counterpoint | Victor Rice | |
| 1967 | Rosie! | Cabot Shaw | |
| 1968 | How to Steal the World | General Maximilian Harmon | The Man from U.N.C.L.E. film |
| 1968 | Shadow Over Elveron | Sheriff Verne Drover | |
| 1968 | Dayton's Devils | Frank Dayton | |
| 1968 | Companions in Nightmare | Dr. Neesden | |
| 1969 | Deadlock | Lieutenant Sam Danforth | |
| 1969 | Trial Run | Jason Harkness | |
| 1969 | How to Commit Marriage | Phil Fletcher | |
| 1969 | Change of Mind | Sheriff Webb | |
| 1970 | Four Rode Out | Mr. Brown | |
| 1970 | Night Slaves | Sheriff Henshaw | |
| 1970 | The Aquarians | Official | |
| 1970 | Hauser's Memory | Joseph Slaughter | |
| 1971 | Incident in San Francisco | Lieutenant Brubaker | |
| 1971 | The Resurrection of Zachary Wheeler | Harry Walsh | |
| 1971 | They Call It Murder | Frank Antrim | |
| 1972 | The Poseidon Adventure | Captain Harrison | |
| 1973 | Snatched | Bill Sutting | |
| 1973 | The Letters | Derek Childs | segment "The Parkingtons" |
| 1973 | Amanda Fallon | Mr. Cummings | |
| 1973 | The Return of Charlie Chan | Alexander Hadrachi | |
| 1973 | And Millions Will Die | Jack Gallagher | |
| 1974 | Can Ellen Be Saved? | Arnold Lindsey | |
| 1975 | Threshold: The Blue Angels Experience | Narrator | |
| 1976 | Brinks: The Great Robbery | Agent Norman Houston | |
| 1976 | Project Kill | Jonathan Trevor | |
| 1976 | Grand Jury | John Williams | |
| 1977 | Day of the Animals | Paul Jenson | |
| 1977 | Viva Knievel! | Stanley Millard | |
| 1977 | The Amsterdam Kill | Riley Knight | |
| 1977 | Sixth and Main | John Doe | |
| 1978 | Little Mo | Nelson Fisher | |
| 1978 | The Mad Trapper | | |
| 1979 | Institute for Revenge | Counselor Hollis Barnes | |
| 1979 | Riel | Major Crozier | |
| 1979 | City on Fire | Mayor William Dudley | |
| 1980 | OHMS | Governor | |
| 1980 | Airplane! | Dr. Rumack | First comedy role |
| 1980 | Prom Night | Mr. Raymond Hammond | |
| 1981 | A Choice of Two | Unknown | |
| 1982 | Twilight Theater | Various Characters | |
| 1982 | Murder Among Friends | Unknown | |
| 1982 | Creepshow | Richard Vickers | "Something to Tide You Over" segment |
| 1982 | Wrong Is Right | Franklin Mallory | |
| 1982 | Foxfire Light | Reece Morgan | |
| 1983 | The Night the Bridge Fell Down | Paul Warren | |
| 1983 | Cave-In! | Joseph 'Joe' Johnson | |
| 1983 | The Creature Wasn't Nice | Captain Jamieson | Also named Spaceship |
| 1985 | Reckless Disregard | Bob Franklin | |
| 1985 | Blade in Hong Kong | Harry Ingersoll | |
| 1985 | Striker's Mountain | Jim McKay | |
| 1986 | The Patriot | Admiral Frazer | |
| 1986 | Soul Man | Mr. Dunbar | |
| 1987 | Nightstick | Thad Evans | |
| 1987 | Home Is Where the Hart Is | Sheriff Nashville Schwartz | |
| 1987 | Nuts | Allen Green | Final non-comedy role |
| 1988 | Dangerous Curves | Greg Krevske | |
| 1988 | The Naked Gun: From the Files of Police Squad! | Frank Drebin | |
| 1989 | The Railway Dragon | Narrator | First animated film |
| 1990 | Repossessed | Father Jedediah Mayii | |
| 1991 | The Naked Gun 2 1/2: The Smell of Fear | Frank Drebin | Nominated—MTV Movie Award for Best Kiss (shared with Priscilla Presley) |
| 1991 | All I Want for Christmas | Santa Claus | Family holiday film |
| 1991 | Chance of a Lifetime | Lloyd Dixon | |
| 1993 | Surf Ninjas | Colonel Chi | |
| 1993 | Digger | Arthur Evrensel | |
| 1994 | Naked Gun 33 1/3: The Final Insult | Frank Drebin | |
| 1994 | S.P.Q.R.: 2,000 and a Half Years Ago | Lucio Cinico | |
| 1995 | Rent-a-Kid | Harry Haber | |
| 1995 | Mr. Willowby's Christmas Tree | Willowby's butler | |
| 1995 | Dracula: Dead and Loving It | Count Dracula | |
| 1996 | Harvey | Dr. Chumley | |
| 1996 | Spy Hard | Dick Steele/Agent WD-40 | |
| 1997 | Family Plan | Harry Haber | |
| 1997 | Mr. Magoo | Mr. Magoo | |
| 1998 | Safety Patrol | Mr. Penn | |
| 1998 | Wrongfully Accused | Ryan Harrison | |
| 1999 | Pirates 4-D | Captain Lucky | 4D Cinema Show presented at various Busch Gardens amusement parks |
| 2000 | Santa Who? | Santa Claus | |
| 2000 | 2001: A Space Travesty | Marshal Richard 'Dick' Dix | |
| 2001 | Camouflage | Jack Potter | |
| 2001 | Kevin of the North | Clive Thornton | Also named Chilly Dogs |
| 2002 | Men with Brooms | Gordon Cutter | |
| 2003 | Scary Movie 3 | President Harris | |
| 2003 | Noël Noël | English Narrator | |
| 2006 | Scary Movie 4 | President Harris | |
| 2007 | Music Within | Bill Austin | |
| 2008 | Superhero Movie | Uncle Albert | |
| 2008 | An American Carol | Grampa / Osama Bin Nielsen | |
| 2008 | Slap Shot 3: The Junior League | Mayor of Charlestown | |
| 2009 | Stan Helsing | Kay | |
| 2009 | Spanish Movie | Doctor | |
| 2011 | Stonerville | Producer | Released posthumously |
| N/A | The Waterman Movie | Ready Espanosa | Unfinished film; voice acting |

== Television ==
| Year | Title | Role | Other Notes |
|---|---|---|---|
| 1950 | The Clock | | Season 1 Episode 53: "A Grave Plot" |
| 1950 | The Clock | | Season 2 Episode 1: "Prescription for Death" |
| 1950–1951 | The Web | Dennis | "Home for Christmas" [S1, E7] "You Killed Elizabeth" [S1, E30] |
| 1951–1953 | Tales of Tomorrow | Robbie / Com. Farragut / Harold / Bert | Episode "Appointment on Mars" / Episode "20,000 Leagues Under the Sea: The Escape" / Episode "Another Chance" / Episode "Ghost Writer" |
| 1953 | Jukebox Jury | Himself | |
| 1954 | Studio One | Dr. Roger Waring | Episode "Dark Possession" |
| 1958 | First Performance | Ted | 'Panic at Parth Bay', episode, broadcast 7 October |
| 1958–1963 | Alfred Hitchcock Presents | Lloyd Ashley, District Attorney Rudy Cox, Steven Grainger | Season 4 Episode 5: "The $2,000,000 Defense", Season 6 Episode 38: "Ambition", Season 9 Episode 13: "The Magic Shop" |
| 1959 | The Swamp Fox | Colonel Francis Marion | |
| 1959 | Rawhide | Eli Becker | Season 1 Episode 18: "Incident Below the Brazos" |
| 1960 | Thriller | Alan Patterson | Episode "The Twisted Image" |
| 1960 | Wagon Train | Jeremy Dow | Season 4 Episode 14: "The Jeremy Dow Story" |
| 1960 | The Untouchables | Tom Sebring | Episode "Three Thousand Suspects" |
| 1960 | Route 66 | Mark Christopher | Single episode |
| 1961 | The Islanders | Howard Cavanaugh | Episode "Willy's Millionaire" |
| 1961 | The New Breed | Lieutenant Price Adams | Regular |
| 1963 | Channing | Professor Paul Stafford | Single episode |
| 1963–1965 | Kraft Suspense Theatre | Dr. David Cord & Paul Maytric | Two episodes: "One Step Down" & "The Green Felt Jungle" |
| 1963–1964 | The Fugitive | Martin C. Rowland & Harold Cheyney | Two episodes |
| 1964 | Wagon Train | Brian Conlin | Season 8 Episode 6: "The Brian Conlin Story" |
| 1964 | Daniel Boone | William Russell | Season 1 Episode 11: "Mountain of the Dead" |
| 1964 | Your First Impression | Himself | Single episode |
| 1964–1969 | The Virginian | Various | Five episodes |
| 1965 | Voyage to the Bottom of the Sea | Capt. Wayne Adams | Single episode: "The Creature" |
| 1965 | Peyton Place | Vincent and Kenneth Markham | 19 episodes |
| 1965 | The F.B.I. | Army Chaplain Craig Fletcher | Single Episode: "Pound of Flesh" |
| 1965 | The Wild Wild West | General Ball | Single episode |
| 1967 | Bonanza | Sheriff Paul Rowan | Episode: "The Unseen Wound" |
| 1968 | The Man from U.N.C.L.E. | General Maximillian Harmon | Single episode: "The Seven Wonders of the World Affair, Pt. 1 & 2" |
| 1969 | The Bold Ones: The Protectors | Deputy Police Chief Sam Danforth | Seven episodes |
| 1969 | The Big Valley | Sergeant Major Earl Conway | One episode "Town of No Exit" |
| 1969 | Gunsmoke | Jess Trevor | Episode: "Time of the Jackals" |
| 1969–1974 | Hawaii Five-O | Brent & Colonel Faraday | Two episodes |
| 1970 | Bracken's World | John Bracken | Fifteen Bracken's World episodes total |
| 1971, 1975 | Columbo | Peter Hamilton, A.J. "Geronimo" Henderson (respectively) | Episode: Lady in Waiting and Identity Crisis |
| 1971 | Bearcats! | Colonel Ted Donovan | Episode "The Big Guns" |
| 1971 | Night Gallery | The Phantom, Colonel Dennis Malloy | Two episodes: "Phantom of What Opera?" and "A Question of Fear" |
| 1973 | M*A*S*H | Colonel Buzz Brighton | Season 1 Episode 16: "The Ringbanger" |
| 1973 | Barnaby Jones | Edward Brendon | Season 2 Episode 11: "The Killing Defense" |
| 1973 | The F.B.I. | Eddy | Episode "Fool's Gold" |
| 1973–1974 | The Streets of San Francisco | Ofc. Joe Landers, Inspector John T. Connor & Big Jake Wilson | Three episodes |
| 1973–1974 | Cannon | Gilbert, Elliott Strawn, Weller Dane, Eric Strauss | 3x14 "Valley of The Damned", 4x10 "The Man Who Couldn't Forget", 5x06 "The Man Who Died Twice" |
| 1974 | Kojak | Michael Hagar | Single episode: "Loser Takes All" |
| 1974 | Ironside | Peter Justin | Season 8 Episode 11: "The Over-the-Hill Blues" |
| 1975 | Kung Fu | Vincent Corbino | Four episodes |
| 1975, 1977 | Match Game | Himself/Panelist | 10 episodes (total) |
| 1975–1976 | S.W.A.T. | Larry Neal / Vince Richie | Three episodes |
| 1977–1979 | The Love Boat | Russ Blanchard, Dan Michaels, Hank Hardaway | Season 1 Episode 10: "Dear Beverly/The Strike/Special Deliverys", Season 1 Episode 22: "Parents Know Best; A Selfless Love; The Nubile Nurse", Season 2 Episode 24: "Ages of Man/Bo 'n Sam/Families" |
| 1978–1980 | Fantasy Island | Doctor Whitfield, Victor Conti, Emile Bouvier | Season 1 Episode 10: "Superstar/Salem", Season 2 Episode 14: "Seance/The Treasure", Season 3 Episode 17: "PlayGirl/Smith's Valhalla" |
| 1979 | Backstairs at the White House | Ike Hoover/Chief Usher Ike Hoover | Three episodes: Episodes #1.1, #1.2, #1.3 |
| 1979 | The Albertans | Don MacIntosh | Two episodes: Episodes #1.1, #1.2 |
| 1980 | The Littlest Hobo | Mayor Chester Montgomery | Episode "Romiet and Julio" |
| 1982 | Police Squad! | Det. Frank Drebin | Nominated—Primetime Emmy Award for Outstanding Lead Actor in a Comedy Series |
| 1983 | Prime Times | Himself, Host | |
| 1984 | Shaping Up | Buddy Fox | Five episodes |
| 1985 | The Ray Bradbury Theater | Fantoccini | Episode "Marionettes, Inc." |
| 1985–1986 | Murder, She Wrote | Captain Daniels & David Everett | Two episodes |
| 1986–1987 | KTXL-TV News Promos | Himself | A series of commercials, promoting Sacramento TV station KTXL-TV's new satellite truck and weekend 10 p.m. newscasts. |
| 1987 | Highway to Heaven | Richard R. Benson | Episode "Gift of Life" |
| 1987 | Race for the Bomb | Lewis Strauss | Two episodes |
| 1987–1988 | Who's the Boss? | Max | Two episodes |
| 1988 | Day By Day | Jack Harper | Episode "Harper and Son"; Nominated—Primetime Emmy Award for Outstanding Guest Actor in a Comedy Series |
| 1990 | Fraud Squad | Lt Frank Drebin | Series of four British television adverts for Red Rock Cider, in the style of Police Squad and Naked Gun |
| 1990 | Saturday Night Live | Himself | Single episode |
| 1992 | The Golden Girls | Lucas Hollingsworth | Series finale |
| 1993 | Herman's Head | God | Single episode |
| 1994–1999 | Due South | Sergeant Buck Frobisher | Four episodes |
| 1993–1996, 2000–2002 | Katie and Orbie | Narrator | Seventy eight episodes |
| 1995 | Mr. Willowby's Christmas Tree | Mr. Willowby's Butler, Baxter | Television Christmas special |
| 2001 | Liocracy | Terrence Brynne McKennie | |
| 2002 | Chilly Beach | Santa Claus | Single episode |
| | This Is America with Dennis Wholey | Himself, Panelist | Single episode |
| 2004 | Zeroman | Les Mutton / Zeroman | (Voice actor); Thirteen episodes |
| 2005 | Odd Job Jack | Skitzkopf | Episode: "Jack Ryder Goes to War!" |
| 2007 | Doctor*Ology | Himself, Host | |
| 2007 | Lipshitz Saves the World | Lipshitz's mentor | Pilot |
| 2007 | Robson Arms | Cado Vasco | Three episodes |
| 2007 | Family Guy | Dr. Barry Rumack | Episode: "Blue Harvest"; Archive audio |

== Video ==
- 1980: Dive to the Edge of Creation (National Geographic Special)
- 1993: Bad Golf Made Easier
- 1994: Bad Golf My Way
- 1997: Stupid Little Golf Video
- 1997: National Geographic Video: The Savage Garden
- Nielsen also appeared in a promotional video for Layman Allen's mathematics game called Equations and in the Seaworld San Antonio Summer Nights 4-D show "Pirates 4-D".
