= Rick Friedberg =

American producer and director

- Born: March 11, 1944 (age 82)
- Occupations: Film director, producer, writer
- Known for: Spy Hard
- Children: Jason, Alix, Nicholas

Rick Friedberg (born March 11, 1944) is an American film and television director, screenwriter and producer, best known for his work with Leslie Nielsen. He is also the author of Hollywood War Stories, How to Survive in the Trenches, a memoir/advice guide on the film industry.

== Career ==
Friedberg made his feature film debut in 1980 with the comedy Pray TV starring Dabney Coleman, followed by 1983's Off the Wall. He would direct television episodes for The Twilight Zone, New Monkees and CityKids. When Friedberg made the comic instruction video Bad Golf Made Easier with Leslie Nielsen, he showed his son Jason Friedberg's script to him, which was parodying James Bond movies and other action films. Nielsen approved, and this led to 1996's Spy Hard. The film eventually grossed $26 million against a production budget of $18 million.

Through the 2000s and 2010s, Friedberg served as second unit director on series like CSI: Miami and Scorpion, as well as director/field producer on The Real Housewives of Orange County.

== Filmography ==
=== Feature films ===
Year	Title	Director	Writer	Producer	Notes
1983	Off the Wall	Yes	Yes	No	
1996	Spy Hard	Yes	Screenplay	Yes	

=== Television ===
Year	Title	Director	Writer	Producer	Notes
1980	Pray TV	Yes	Yes	Yes	TV movie; lyrics: "Billy Bob Jingle"
1985	The Twilight Zone	Yes	No	No	1 Episode (Wish Bank)
1987	New Monkees	Yes	No	No	2 episodes
1993	CityKids	Yes	No	No	6 episodes
2006–2008	The Real Housewives of Orange County	No	No	Field	28 episodes
2008–2009	CSI: Miami	Second Unit	No	No	5 episodes
2014–2018	Scorpion	Second Unit	No	12 episodes	

=== Direct-To-Video ===
Year	Title	Director	Producer	Notes
1988	W.A.S.P. - Videos... In the Raw	Yes	No	
1990	Playboy: Sensual Pleasures of Oriental Massage	No	Creative	Documentary
1993	Leslie Nielsen's Bad Golf Made Easier	Yes	No	
1993	Our First Video	Yes	No	Video Short "Brother for Sale"
1994	Bad Golf My Way	Yes	No	
1997	Our Music Video	Yes	No	Segment "Brother for Sale"

=== Music videos ===
- Hot for Teacher
- Summertime Girls
- Blind in Texas
- Wild Child
