= The Naked Truth =

The Naked Truth may refer to:

== Literature ==
- The Naked Truth, or the True State of the Primitive Church, a 1675 book by Herbert Croft
- The Naked Truth, a 1910 play by George Paston and W. B. Maxwell
- Naked Truth, the American alternative title of Nuda Veritas, a 1927 novel by Clare Sheridan
- The Naked Truth (novel), a 1993 fictional memoir by Leslie Nielsen
- The Naked Truth, a 1994 play by Paul Rudnick
- The Naked Truth (Sandler book), a 2007 book by Kevin S. Sandler, which serves as a commentary on film ratings
- The Naked Truth: About Sex, Love and Relationships, a 2007 book by Lakita Garth
- The Naked Truth: From the Goal Mind of Abu Shahid, the Elder of the Nation of Gods and Earths, a 2008 book by Wakeel Allah
- The Naked Truth, a 2010 memoir by Danielle Staub
- The Naked Truth: An Irreverent Chronicle of Delirious Escapades, a 2015 book by Jean-Pierre Dorléac
- The Naked Truth, a 2018 novel by Vi Keeland
- The Naked Truth, a 2019 memoir by Leslie Morgan Steiner

== Film ==
- The Naked Truth (1914 film), a silent Italian film
- The Naked Truth (1915 film), an alternative title for Hypocrites, an American silent film, or a character in the film
- The Naked Truth (1924 film), reissue title for the American film The Solitary Sin, a sex hygiene film
- The Naked Truth (1932 film), an American German-language comedy film
- The Naked Truth (1957 film), a British film comedy
- The Naked Truth (1992 film), a comedy film

== Music ==
- The Naked Truth (Golden Earring album), 1992
- The Naked Truth (Lil' Kim album), 2005
- Naked Truth (Sarah Hudson album), 2005
- Naked Truth (Jeanette album), 2006

== TV ==
- The Naked Truth (Russian TV program), hosted by Svetlana Pesotskaya
- The Naked Truth (TV series), an American television sitcom
- "The Naked Truth" (Falcon Crest), a 1985 episode
- "The Naked Truth" (Fresh Fields), a 1984 episode
- "The Naked Truth" (Home Improvement), a 1995 episode
- "The Naked Truth" (How I Met Your Mother), a 2011 episode
- "The Naked Truth" (Pretty Little Liars), a 2012 episode
- "The Naked Truth" (The Real Housewives of Potomac), a 2023 episode
- "The Naked Truth" (Related), a 2005 episode

== Other ==
- The Naked Truth (statue), a statue in St. Louis
- Veritas, the Roman goddess of truth, often depicted nude in art as nuda veritas (“naked truth”)
