= Lewis Arquette =

American actor (1935–2001)

- Arquette in 1999
- Born: Lewis Michael Arquette; December 14, 1935; Chicago, Illinois, U.S.
- Died: February 10, 2001 (aged 65); Los Angeles, California, U.S.
- Resting place: Rose Hills Memorial Park
- Occupation: Actor
- Years active: 1958–2001
- Spouse: Brenda Olivia "Mardi" Nowak (m. 1963; died 1997)
- Children: 5, including Rosanna, Patricia, Alexis, and David
- Father: Cliff Arquette

Lewis Michael Arquette (/ɑːrˈkɛt/ ar-KET; December 14, 1935 – February 10, 2001) was an American actor who worked in film and television. He played J.D. Pickett on the television series, The Waltons from 1978 to 1981, and appeared in several supporting roles throughout his career.

== Early life ==
Born in Chicago, Illinois, Arquette was the only son of Mildred Nesbitt Le May and actor Cliff Arquette. He stated that he was named after explorer Meriwether Lewis, and claimed familial descent.

Arquette graduated from Hollywood High School and went on to study at New York's Lee Strasberg Actor's Studio. From there, he moved to Chicago in the 1970s.

== Career ==
While living in Chicago, Arquette worked in theater management, serving as manager of The Second City theater for several years. There, he was involved in administration of the improvisational comedy company.

In film and television, Arquette worked as a character actor who appeared in supporting roles across several decades. In addition to his recurring role as J. D. Pickett on The Waltons, he made guest appearances on television programs and appeared in feature films as authority figures, working-class characters, or other supporting roles. In addition to acting, Arquette performed as a musician and a puppeteer.

In 1970, Arquette moved to a Subud commune (described by his daughter Patricia as a "hippie commune") in Front Royal, Virginia.

== Personal life ==
His wife, Brenda Olivia "Mardi" Arquette (née Nowak), died in 1997 from breast cancer. She was Jewish and the daughter of a Holocaust refugee from Poland, while Lewis Arquette, raised a Catholic, was a convert to Islam.

His children are actors Patricia, Alexis, Rosanna, David, and Richmond Arquette. He is the former father-in-law of actress Courteney Cox, film composer James Newton Howard, and actors Thomas Jane and Nicolas Cage.

While Arquette struggled with substance abuse throughout his life, he died in Los Angeles, California on February 10, 2001, at the age of 65, due to congestive heart failure.

== Filmography ==
=== Actor ===
- The Very Naked Canvas (1965)
- Alice (1977, TV Series) .... Officer Hertzig
- Man from Atlantis (1977, TV Series) .... Friar Laurence
- Ruby and Oswald (1978, TV Movie) (a.k.a. Four Days in Dallas)
- Loose Shoes (1978) (a.k.a. Coming Attractions, a.k.a. Quackers) .... Warden
- Rescue from Gilligan's Island (1978, TV Movie) .... Judge
- Fantasy Island (1978–1981, TV Series) .... Slocumb / Fred Waters / Jeff Logan
- The Waltons (1978–1981, TV Series) .... Jefferson Davis 'J.D.' Pickett
- Barney Miller (1979, TV Series) .... Finney
- The China Syndrome (1979) .... Hatcher
- Mrs. Columbo (1979, TV Series) (a.k.a. Kate Columbo (USA), a.k.a. Kate Loves a Mystery, a.k.a. Kate the Detective – The Valley Strangler) .... Howard
- Tenspeed and Brown Shoe (1980, TV Series) .... Lieber
- The Jayne Mansfield Story (1980, TV Movie) (a.k.a. Jayne Mansfield: A Symbol of the 50s) .... Publicity Man
- Pray TV (1980) (a.k.a. K-GOD) .... Fred Wilson
- The Incredible Hulk (1981, TV Series) .... Les Creaseman
- The Smurfs (1981–1987, TV Series) ... a.k.a. Smurfs' Adventures) .... (voice)
- Simon & Simon (1982, TV Series) .... Matt
- Off the Wall (1983) .... Prison Chaplain
- Remington Steele (1983, TV Series) .... Stuart Thorpe
- Riptide (1984, TV Series) .... Sidney Gorman
- Matt Houston (1984, TV Series) .... City Councilman Roberts
- St. Elsewhere (1984, TV Series) .... Judge Ellsworth
- Challenge of the GoBots (1984, TV Series) .... (voice)
- Sherlock Hound (1984–1985, TV Series) (a.k.a. Meitantei Holmes) .... Dr. Watson, Inspector Lestrade, Smiley, additional voices (English version, voice)
- E/R (1984, TV Series) .... Arnie Popkin (as Louis Arquette)
- Badge of the Assassin (1985, TV Movie) .... 1st Foreman
- The Fall Guy (1985, TV Series) .... Ghost
- Rocky Road (1985–1986, TV Series) .... Lucas Buchanan
- Rock 'n' Wrestling (1985, TV Series) (a.k.a. Hulk Hogan's Rock 'N' Wrestling (USA: complete title)) .... Superfly Jimmy Snuka (voice)
- Just Between Friends (1986) .... TV Station Guard
- The Check Is in the Mail (1986) (a.k.a. The Cheque Is in the Post (UK)) .... Man at pool
- Sledge Hammer! (1986, TV Series) (a.k.a. Sledge Hammer: The Early Years (USA: second season title)) .... Jacob
- Nobody's Fool (1986, with daughter Rosanna) .... Mr. Fry
- Tall Tales & Legends (1986, TV Series) (a.k.a. Shelley Duvall's Tall Tales and Legends (USA: complete title)) .... George / Jimbo Smith / Narrator
- Perfect Strangers (1987, TV Series) .... Rowdy Hockey Fan #1 (as Louis Arquette)
- Mama's Family (1986, TV Series) .... Grand Viper
- Married... with Children (1987, TV Series) .... Ed
- ALF (1987, TV Series) .... Ed Billings
- Big Business (1988) .... Mr. Stokes
- The Great Outdoors (1988) .... Herm
- Akira (1988) .... Doctor Onishi / Council 2 / Senator / Clown / Crowd Skeptic / Resistance 1 (voice: Streamline Pictures dub)
- A Pup Named Scooby-Doo (1988, TV Series) .... (voice)
- Dance 'til Dawn (1988, TV Movie) .... Pawnbroker
- My First Love (1988, TV Movie) .... Mark Grossman
- A Very Brady Christmas (1988, TV Movie) .... Sam / Santa
- Paradise (1988–1989, TV Series) (a.k.a. Guns of Paradise (new title)) .... Mr. Sinclair
- Quantum Leap (1989, TV Series).... Father Muldooney
- The Horror Show (1989) (a.k.a. Horror House, a.k.a. House 3 (Australia: video title), a.k.a. House III: The Horror Show (UK: video title)) .... Lt. Miller
- Kiki's Delivery Service (1989) (a.k.a. Kiki's Delivery Service (USA), a.k.a. The Witch's Express Mail (literal title)) .... (English version, voice)
- Charles in Charge (1989, TV Series).... Clarence Lembeck
- Chopper Chicks in Zombietown (1989) (a.k.a. Cycle Sluts (USA)) .... Sheriff Bugiere
- Dad (1989) .... (voice)
- Tango & Cash (1989) .... Wyler
- Camp Candy (1989–1992, TV Series) .... Rex DeForest III (voice)
- Tales from the Crypt (1990, TV Series) (a.k.a. HBO's Tales from the Crypt – Lower Berth) .... Ernest Feeley
- Tom and Jerry Kids (1990, TV series) .... Blast-Off Buzzard, Additional voices
- Captain Planet and the Planeteers (1990, TV Series short) (a.k.a. The New Adventures of Captain Planet (USA: fourth season title)) .... (voice)
- Syngenor (1990) .... Ethan Valentine
- Gravedale High (1990, TV Series) (a.k.a. Rick Moranis in Gravedale High (USA: complete title)) .... (voice)
- Matlock (1990, TV Series) .... Commissioner
- Book of Love (1990) .... Mr. Malloy
- Yo Yogi! (1991, TV series) .... Bombastic Bobby (voice, "Yo, Yogi!")
- Get a Life (1991, TV Series) .... Justice of the Peace
- Rock 'n' Roll High School Forever (1991) .... Mr. Cheese
- Morton & Hayes (1991, TV Series) .... Mr. Caldicott
- The Linguini Incident (1991) .... Texas Joe
- Double Trouble (1992) .... Tarlow
- Let's Kill All the Lawyers (1992) .... Antinus
- L.A. Law (1992, TV Series) .... Inspector Dodek
- Beverly Hills, 90210 (1992, TV Series) .... Priest
- A Child Lost Forever: The Jerry Sherwood Story (1992, TV Movie) (a.k.a. A Child Lost Forever (USA: short title)) .... Walter Vinton
- Tainted Blood (1993, TV Movie) .... Artie
- Attack of the 50 Ft. Woman (1993, TV Movie) .... Mr. Ingersol
- Menendez: A Killing in Beverly Hills (1994, TV Movie) .... Lyle's Jury: Juror #3
- Sleep with Me (1994) .... Minister
- Freddy Pharkas: Frontier Pharmacist (1994, Video Game) .... Whittlin' Willie / P. H. Balance (voice)
- Saved by the Bell: The New Class (1994, TV Series) .... Uncle Lester
- The Flintstones: Wacky Inventions (1994, Video short) .... Prof, Einstone (voice)
- SeaQuest DSV (1995, TV Series) (a.k.a. SeaQuest 2032 (USA: new title)) .... Kearny
- Stuart Saves His Family (1995) .... Cemetery official
- Wild Side (1995) .... The Chief
- Seinfeld (1995, Episode: "The Secret Code") .... Leapin' Larry
- Babylon 5 (1996, TV Series) (a.k.a. B5 (USA: promotional abbreviation)) .... General Smits
- Hypernauts (1996, TV Series) .... Horten (voice)
- Waiting for Guffman (1996) .... Clifford Wooley
- The Real Adventures of Jonny Quest (1996, TV Series) (a.k.a. Jonny Quest: The Real Adventures – The Ballad of Belle Bonnet) .... Civilian / Driver (voice)
- Mojave Moon (1996) .... Charlie
- Kid Cop (1996) .... Mayor Cosgrove
- Fox Hunt (1996) .... The Wolf
- Meet Wally Sparks (1997) .... Cardinal
- Princess Mononoke (1997) .... (English version, voice)
- Life During Wartime (1997) (a.k.a. The Alarmist (USA: new title)) .... Bruce Hudler
- The Westing Game (1997, TV Movie) (a.k.a. Get a Clue (USA: video title)) .... Otis Amber
- Kiss & Tell (1997) .... Inspector Dan Furbal
- Sleepwalkers (1997, TV Series)
- Born Bad (1997) .... Bank Manager
- Scream 2 (1997) .... Chief Lewis Hartley
- Murder One: Diary of a Serial Killer (1997, TV Mini-Series)
- A River Made to Drown In (1997) .... Vagabond
- Adventures with Barbie: Ocean Discovery (1997, Video Game) .... (voice)
- Spawn (1997–1999, TV Series) (a.k.a. Todd McFarlane's Spawn) .... (voice)
- Twilight (1998) .... Water Pistol Man
- Almost Heroes (1998) .... Merchant
- Ready to Rumble (2000) .... Fred King
- Best in Show (2000) .... Fern City Show Spectator
- Little Nicky (2000) .... Cardinal
- Escape from Monkey Island (2000, Video Game) .... Freddie (voice)
- FreakyLinks (2001, TV Series) .... Bob Frewer
- Out Cold (2001) .... Herbert 'Papa' Muntz
- As Told by Ginger (2000–2001, TV Series) .... Mr Cilia (voice)

=== Theme Park Attractions ===
- The Great Texas Longhorn Revue (1982–1988, Six Flags AstroWorld, Animatronic Show) .... Slick Silver
- The St. Louis River Revue (1987, SS Admiral, Animatronic Show) .... Louie Wails

=== Writer ===
- The Lorenzo and Henrietta Music Show (1976) TV Series (writer)

=== Producer ===
- The Lorenzo and Henrietta Music Show (1976) TV Series (executive producer)

=== Himself ===
- This Is Your Life – Cliff Arquette (1960) TV Episode .... Himself
- The Jonathan Winters Show – Episode dated April 3, 1969 (1969) TV Episode .... Himself
