= Pray TV (1980 film) =

1980 comedy film directed by Rick Friedberg

- DVD cover
- Directed by: Rick Friedberg
- Written by: Dick Chudnow; Rick Friedberg; Nick Castle
- Produced by: Rick Friedberg; Tina Stern
- Starring: Dabney Coleman; Devo; Archie Hahn; Joyce Jameson; Dr. John; Nancy Morgan; Roger E. Mosley; Marcia Wallace
- Cinematography: Terry Clairmont
- Edited by: Peter H. Verity
- Music by: Nick Castle; Dick Chudnow; Adapted and supervised by George S. Clinton
- Production company: ABC Circle Films
- Distributed by: Filmways Pictures
- Release date: 1980
- Running time: 86 minutes
- Country: United States
- Language: English

Pray TV (also known as KGOD) is a 1980 American comedy film spoofing televangelism, directed and co-written by Rick Friedberg.

The film stars Dabney Coleman, Archie Hahn, Nancy Morgan, Joyce Jameson, Lewis Arquette, Marcia Wallace and Roger E. Mosley, with cameos by Dr. John and the band Devo (who play a Christian rock band named "Dove", an anagram of Devo). Film critics David Nusair and Scott Weinberg note that the 1989 film UHF is very similar in both plot and style to Pray TV.

== Plot ==
Failing UHF TV station KRUD, Channel 17, is "reborn" as Christian television station KGOD. The new format is a big success but attracts an incompatible mix of fringe ministries and broadcasters wanting time on the station. A series of humorous vignettes show the different religious shows the station broadcasts: a faith healer, a radical black nationalist preacher, a preacher with a drive-in church, a Christian game show, etc.

== Cast ==
- Lewis Arquette as Fred Wilson
- Jaime Lyn Bauer as Mary of Nazareth
- Stymie Beard as Willie Washington usher
- Charlie Brill as Dr. Ramirez
- Dick Chudnow as newsboy / Mexican / wino / Hassidic Jew / possessed boy / legally-dead Harold / Bruce the orderly
- Dabney Coleman as Marvin Fleece
- Devo as "Dove"
- Archie Hahn as Fletcher Peebles
- Charles Haid as Buck Sunday
- Deidre Hall as Sarah of Nazareth
- Bobby Herbeck as Scooter Hayes
- Joyce Jameson as Millie Peebles
- Dr. John as self
- Bill Kirchenbauer as Elvin
- Biff Manard as Billie Bob Joe Brown
- Anna Mathias as Freedom Sunshine
- Nancy Morgan as Peggy Williams
- Roger E. Mosley as Willie Washington / Leroy Washington
- Paul Reubens as Jack
- Marcia Wallace as Alice Kidd

== Release ==
Pray TV was picked up by Filmways Pictures in 1981 (under its original name, KGOD). The film premiered on television instead of theatrically, and aired on Showtime in 1983 under its present title. It was issued on DVD on November 15, 2005.
