= Doug Draizin =

American producer

Doug Draizin is an American producer known for films such as Fools Rush In (1997 film), Spy Hard and Safety Patrol (film). He is a graduate of New York Institute of Technology. Draizin is Jewish.
