= Frank Drebin =

- Frank in Naked Gun 33 1/3: The Final Insult
- First appearance: "A Substantial Gift (The Broken Promise)"; Police Squad!; 1982
- Last appearance: Naked Gun 33 1/3: The Final Insult; 1994
- Created by: Jerry Zucker, Jim Abrahams, and David Zucker
- Portrayed by: Leslie Nielsen

In-universe information
- Aliases: Tony De'Wonderful; Bob Kelly; Enrico Pallazzo; Nick "The Slasher" McGuirk "Weird Al" Yankovic; Phil Donahue
- Titles: Sergeant; Detective; Lieutenant
- Occupation: Police officer
- Spouse: Jane Spencer-Drebin
- Children: Frank Drebin Jr.

Frank Drebin is a fictional character in the Police Squad! television series and The Naked Gun movies played by Leslie Nielsen.

== Appearances ==
=== Television ===
The character of Frank Drebin was introduced in "A Substantial Gift (The Broken Promise)", the first episode of the 1982 comedy series Police Squad! that aired on ABC. Drebin is a police officer with the rank of detective lieutenant and is a member of the Police Squad task force. The show was cancelled after four episodes, though two more were broadcast later.

=== Film ===
- The Naked Gun: From the Files of Police Squad! (1988)
- The Naked Gun 2½: The Smell of Fear (1991)
- Naked Gun 33 1/3: The Final Insult (1994)

Liam Neeson plays Frank Drebin Jr. in The Naked Gun, released in August 2025. The late Frank Drebin Sr. appears in a photograph at Police Squad and later in the form of an owl to help his son.

=== Miscellaneous ===
Leslie Nielsen features in 1990 TV adverts for the English cider producer Taunton Cider Company's Red Rock Cider brand playing a character identified in at least one as "Lt. F. Drebin".

Nielsen appeared in SummerSlam 1994 as an unnamed detective strongly implied to be Frank Drebin, who is hired to find Undertaker, who had gone missing.

== Conception ==
Leslie Nielsen had mostly serious roles until the movie Airplane! (1980). Director David Zucker preserved this by having Nielsen play the straight man. Zucker based his character on Lee Marvin and Clint Eastwood, while scriptwriter Pat Proft wrote all of Drebin's lines with nothing being improvised. The character's surname Drebin was picked randomly by Zucker from a phonebook. Zucker, Abrahams and Zucker felt that Leslie Nielsen would be perfect for the role, as he had previously acted in many of the types of serious roles that the trio were parodying.

=== Characterization ===
Frank Drebin has been described as a "detective with a heart of gold and a brain of wood" and as "an anachronism, a detective who's unaware of how out of time (and out of his depth) he really is." Frank Drebin is a member of the Police Squad, a special department of the police force, where he served for many years. In the original TV series, he is a competent police officer who plays the straight man in the unique comedy going on around him. He is transformed into a more comical character in the subsequent films. He is renowned for his inept nature, which results in numerous issues, frequently more than he resolves, despite his complete ignorance of them. He consistently demonstrates respect for his associates and those he assists in the television series, despite occasionally inadvertently causing them some distress. In the film, unlike people such as his friend under whom he works, Captain Ed Hocken (Alan North/George Kennedy), he is a very indiscreetly and unsympathetically outspoken man, therefore tending to appear cold and insensitive towards people, and cynical. He just as well lacks having pity and compassion towards struggling individuals when they need it. Also having any of it when conversing with officials who confront him about his mistakes. All of this may be due to the news Frank receives from Ed in the first film: His dedication to police work has caused his wife to leave him for an Olympic gymnast, and she is now having "the best sex she's ever had." While he works under Ed, in the Police Squad, he works with Norberg (Peter Lupus). In the Naked Gun series, he works with Nordberg (O. J. Simpson). Drebin has held the ranks of Sergeant and Lieutenant Detective.

== Reception ==
In 2008, Drebin was selected by Empire magazine as number 55 on The 100 Greatest Movie Characters of All Time, as well as 74 on their newer 2019 list. In 2000, TV Guide named him to its list of the 25 greatest TV detectives, ranking him #23. He was also named by UGO.com as one of The 100 Best Heroes of All Time. Ryan Lambie on Den of Geek argues that, "Nielsen's performance is so perfect because he plays the role of the clumsy, clueless detective almost entirely straight; the situations in which Drebin finds himself may be absurd, but the character at the center of them is entirely serious" and that with his deadpan portrayal, Nielsen's character could very well have been taken straight out of one of the more serious 1960s or 1970s television series.
