= Red Rock Cider =

Alcoholic beverage

Red Rock Cider was an alcoholic beverage produced by Taunton Cider Company and sold in the United Kingdom during the late 1980s and early 1990s. The cider maker grew significantly after WWII due to an increase in inventory orders from other brewing industries who were merging during the 1950s and 1960s.

In 1990, a series of TV adverts, directed by John Lloyd, were produced in the style of Police Squad! (but titled as Fraud Squad!) and starred Leslie Nielsen in a role clearly similar to that of Detective Frank Drebin. (In one advert, an extremely brief close-up of Nielsen's Fraud Squad badge (which actually reads FRIED SQUID) identifies him as "Drebin, Lt. F.") The titles of each advert followed the Police Squad! joke style of having a different title in the voice-over than what appeared captioned on screen. Hank Marvin made a cameo appearance in one advert (after Nielsen's character shouts "Hey you over there in the shadows!") The adverts' strapline was "It's not red, and there's no rocks in it". The line had originally been written as "and it doesn't taste like cider" to reflect the brewery's brief that the drink had a different taste to traditional ciders, but this was dropped shortly before shooting.

The company closed shortly after the UK Monopolies Commission required large breweries to break apart their monopolies. "The Taunton Cider Company" was successfully re-registered by cider enthusiasts in 2015, and began production in 2016. Its cider is produced in Somerset county, which has a rich history of cider production, going back to the late 17th to 19th centuries where cider was considered a currency and farmers would sometimes be paid their daily wage with cider.
