= Taunton Cider Company =

Cider producer in Somerset, England

The Taunton Cider Company was a cider producer, based in Norton Fitzwarren, north west of the county town of Taunton, Somerset, England. The company is best known for being the developer and producer of Blackthorn Cider, now produced by Gaymer Cider Company, a subsidiary of C&C Group plc of Ireland.

== Origin ==
In 1805, a local farmers co-operative had formed to produce cider at Norton Fitzwarren. By the early 1900s, the Reverend Cornish had started producing cider from these locally produced apples and pulp at the Heathfield Rectory. In 1911 the priest and the co-operative set-up the "Taunton Cider Company" in Norton Fitzwarren, to commercially produce his cider.

== After World War I ==
After World War I, producing only non-sparkling cider in traditional wooden barrels, the methodology only allowed the products to be distributed around the wider Taunton area, and hence the company choose only to supply public houses. Becoming a private limited company in April 1921, the structure of the company changed again after the UK Government introduced the Purchase Tax on cider in 1923, but the company managed to continue to produce their basic recipe. After World War II, in the 1950s the introducing of pasteurisation gave the cider a much longer shelf life, allowing the drink to be marketed nationally. Mastering this process allowed the company to purchase local competitors Quantock Vale, Ashford Vale, Bruttons and Horrells.

== The 1980s ==
By the 1980s, the company was the UK's second largest cider maker after Hereford-based H. P. Bulmer, employing 550 people at its Norton Fitzwarren site, which produced 30 million gallons of cider per annum. The main brand was Blackthorn Cider and various derivatives (Original, Dry, Sweet, Special Vat, Cool), as well as: Diamond White; Red Rock; and the draught-only Taunton Original. Autumn Gold was the sweet derivative which was available on draught, in cans and bottles throughout the country. The company also marketed and distributed Miller Genuine Draft lager in the United Kingdom in a joint agreement with the Miller Brewing Company.

== The 1990s ==
In 1995 the company was bought by drinks company Matthew Clark plc for £256 million, which itself is now part of the Gaymers Cider Company.

== Revival ==
In 2016 it was reported that the company had been revived, now based in Churchstanton.

In 2017 the company moved back in to central Taunton.

The reformed company received a number of accolades in 2017 including a diploma in the British Bottlers Institute annual awards, a bronze in both the British Cider Championships and International Cider Awards, and Highly Commended in the Taste of the West Awards. It has also been shortlisted in the Beer and Cider Marketing Awards for Best Launch and the Somerset Business Awards for Best New Business.

The company went into Creditors' Voluntary Liquidation in June 2023.

== See also ==
- List of cider brands
