= Bad Golf My Way =

1994 parody golf video

- VHS cover
- Directed by: Rick Friedberg
- Written by: Henry Beard; David Fisher
- Produced by: Peter Hayman
- Starring: Leslie Nielsen; Bob Donner; Brian Banowetz
- Edited by: Dean Balser
- Distributed by: PolyGram Video
- Release date: 1994
- Running time: 50 minutes
- Country: United States
- Language: English

Bad Golf My Way is a 1994 video by actor Leslie Nielsen. It is the sequel to his first golf video Bad Golf Made Easier and was followed by Stupid Little Golf Video in 1997. Like its predecessor, Bad Golf is a parody of golf and other golf videos and books. This time, Nielsen drives a heel golfer crazy.

In 1996 he released a book of the same name.

== Sequel ==
Stupid Little Golf Video was the third and final film. However, Rick Friedberg was replaced as director by producer Peter Hayman. As of 2019, it is the only one that has been released on DVD. Nielsen's wife Barberee Earl Nielsen makes a cameo as a lady golfer.
