= The Naked Truth (novel) =

1993 novel by Leslie Nielsen and David Fisher

The Naked Truth, by the actor Leslie Nielsen and writer David Fisher, is a fictional autobiography allegedly telling the inside story of Nielsen's life and acting career. The book is written in the style of Nielsen's The Naked Gun series of films, with absurd statements describing him as one of the most important actors in the history of Hollywood. Released in 1993 by Pocket Books (a division of Simon & Schuster, Inc.), the book was a tie-in for the then forthcoming third installment of the Naked Gun series, Naked Gun 33⅓: The Final Insult.

The copyright page notes that "This book is a work of fiction". This is evidenced by numerous photographs featuring Nielsen superimposed on an unrelated scene, including having drinks at a bar with Howdy Doody or teaching the actor James Dean how to act.

== Reception ==
Michael Blowen of The Boston Globe called it "one of the summer's fastest, funniest reads" and opined that there is "more truth about Hollywood in its fabrications than in dozens of other allegedly factual star biographies." Iris Winston of the Ottawa Citizen wrote that while the novel "falls flat when Nielsen attempts to be funny about major historical events" and the "joke palls after a while", the novel as a whole is still "very funny" and there is "no question" that fans of the Naked Gun series "will enjoy the similar deadpan comedy approach". Cam Fuller of The StarPhoenix wrote that the book "throws open the windows and lets some fresh air in."
