= Off the Wall (1983 film) =

1983 American film

- Theatrical release poster
- Directed by: Rick Friedberg
- Written by: Dick Chudnow; Rick Friedberg; Ron Kurz
- Produced by: Tom Daly; Barrie Howells; Frank Mancuso, Jr.
- Starring: Paul Sorvino; Patrick Cassidy; Rosanna Arquette
- Cinematography: Donald A. Morgan
- Edited by: George Hively
- Music by: Dennis McCarthy
- Production company: Hotdogs
- Distributed by: Jensen Farley Pictures
- Release date: July 1984
- Running time: 85 minutes
- Country: United States
- Language: English

Off the Wall is a 1983 American crime comedy film directed by Rick Friedberg, written by Dick Chudnow, and starring Paul Sorvino, Patrick Cassidy, and Rosanna Arquette.

== Plot ==
A young woman frames two hitchhikers for her crimes. Feeling guilty, she tries to break them out.

== Reception ==
Roger Ebert of the Chicago Sun-Times gave the film 1.5 out of 4 stars, calling it "one of the most lame-brained movies of recent years."
