= Bad Golf Made Easier =

1993 parody golf video

- VHS cover
- Directed by: Rick Friedberg
- Written by: Henry Beard
- Produced by: Carter DeHaven
- Starring: Leslie Nielsen; Archie Hahn; Sonny Bono
- Distributed by: ABC Video
- Release date: 1993
- Running time: 33 minutes
- Country: United States
- Language: English

Bad Golf Made Easier is a 1993 33-minute video by actor Leslie Nielsen. It is a parody of golf and other golf videos and books. It demonstrates many humorous bad golf swings, and a slogan found in it is: "I don't play golf to feel bad; I play bad golf but feel good!" In the video, many people hit the dirt out from the ground, drop their golf clubs into the water, and make other mistakes.

== Cast ==
- Leslie Nielsen as Barry
- Archie Hahn as Billy
- Sonny Bono as himself

== Sequels ==
Two sequels, Bad Golf My Way and Stupid Little Golf Video, were released in 1994 and 1997. In keeping with the theme of the first video, Nielsen demonstrated additional golf strategies in a comical format. As of 2019, Stupid Little Golf Video is the only one of the trio that has been released on DVD.
