= Spy Hard =

Film by Rick Friedberg

- Theatrical release poster
- Directed by: Rick Friedberg
- Screenplay by: Rick Friedberg; Dick Chudnow; Jason Friedberg; Aaron Seltzer
- Story by: Jason Friedberg; Aaron Seltzer
- Produced by: Rick Friedberg; Doug Draizin; Jeffrey Konvitz
- Starring: Leslie Nielsen; Nicollette Sheridan; Charles Durning; Marcia Gay Harden; Barry Bostwick; Andy Griffith
- Cinematography: John R. Leonetti
- Edited by: Eric Sears
- Music by: Bill Conti
- Production company: Hollywood Pictures
- Distributed by: Buena Vista Pictures Distribution
- Release date: May 24, 1996
- Running time: 81 minutes
- Country: United States
- Language: English
- Budget: $18 million
- Box office: $84 million

Spy Hard is a 1996 American spy parody film starring Leslie Nielsen (who also executive produced) and Nicollette Sheridan, Charles Durning, Marcia Gay Harden, Barry Bostwick, and Andy Griffith, parodying James Bond and other action films. The introduction to the film is sung by comedy artist "Weird Al" Yankovic, and it was the first film to be written by Jason Friedberg and Aaron Seltzer, who went on to write and direct parody films such as Date Movie, Disaster Movie, and Meet the Spartans. The film's title is a parody of Die Hard. The film was directed by Rick Friedberg (Aaron's father), who produced with Doug Draizin and Jeffrey Konvitz. The film follows Dick Steele, Agent WD-40, who is assigned by his Director, to stop the evil General Rancor from destroying the world. WD-40 believed Rancor was dead and he teams up with the hot KGB Agent Veronique Ukrinsky to find Rancor and save the world.

Spy Hard was released by Buena Vista Pictures under its Hollywood Pictures banner on May 24, 1996. The film received negative reviews from critics, who found the story, screenplay, and Friedberg's direction to be disappointing, but Nielsen's acting and its slapstick humor received some praise. In spite of the criticism, the film was a box-office success, grossing $84 million against a production budget of $18 million.

== Plot ==
Secret agent WD-40 Dick Steele embarks on a mission, along with the mysterious and lovely Veronique Ukrinsky, Agent 3.14, to rescue the kidnapped Barbara Dahl and stop the evil genius, General Rancor, from seizing control of the planet.

Rancor was wounded in an earlier encounter and no longer has arms. However, he can "arm" himself by attaching robotic limbs with various weapons attached. Steele is approached by an old friend, agent Steven Bishop, who unsuccessfully tries to recruit him out of retirement. However, when a news report Steele is watching reveals that Bishop has been killed, Steele returns to the agency. Steele is given his new assignment by the Director, who is also testing out a variety of elaborate disguises. At headquarters, Steele encounters an old agency nemesis, Norm Coleman, and flirts with the Director's adoring secretary, Miss Cheevus.

On the job, Steele is assisted by an agent named Kabul, who gives him rides in a never-ending variety of specially designed cars. They seek help from McLuckey, a blond child who was left home alone and is very good at fending off intruders. Steele resists the temptations of a dangerous woman he finds waiting for him in bed. But he does work very closely with Agent 3.14, whose father, Professor Ukrinsky, is also being held captive by Rancor.

Everything comes to an explosive conclusion at the General's remote fortress, where Steele rescues both Barbara Dahl and Miss Cheevus and launches a literally disarmed Rancor into outer space, saving mankind.

== Cast ==
- Leslie Nielsen as Dick Steele, Agent WD-40
- Nicollette Sheridan as Veronique Ukrinsky, Agent 3.14
- Charles Durning as The Director
- Marcia Gay Harden as Miss Cheevus
- Barry Bostwick as Norm Coleman
- John Ales as Kabul
- Andy Griffith as General Rancor
- Elya Baskin as Professor Ukrinsky
- Mason Gamble as McCluckey
- Carlos Lauchu as "Slice"
- Stephanie Romanov as Victoria Dahl / Barbara Dahl
- Joyce Brothers as Steele's Tag-Team Member
- Brian Howe as Bartender in Hawaiian Shirt
- Ray Charles as Bus Driver
- Hulk Hogan as Dick's Tag-Team Partner
- Roger Clinton as Agent Clinton
- Robert Culp as Businessman
- Fabio Lanzoni as Himself
- Robert Guillaume as Steven Bishop
- Pat Morita as Brian, The Waiter
- Talisa Soto as Desiree More
- Mr. T as Helicopter Pilot
- Alex Trebek as Agency Tape Recorder (voice)
- Taylor Negron as Painter
- Clyde Kusatsu as Noggin
- Curtis Armstrong as Pastry Chef
- Tina Arning as Dancer #1
- William Barillaro as Blind Driver
- Michael Berryman as The Man with the Oxygen Mask
- Downtown Julie Brown as Cigarette Girl
- Stephen Burrows as Agent Burrows
- Keith Campbell as Thug #2
- Carl Ciarfalio as Thug #1
- Brad Grunberg as Postal Worker
- Wayne Cotter as Male Dancer
- Rick Cramer as Heimlich, Rancor Terrorist
- Eddie Deezen as Rancor Guard That Gets Spit On
- Joey Dente as Goombah, Dead Wise Guy
- Paul Eliopoulos as Agent #1
- Andrew Christian English as Paratrooper
- Johnny G as Agent #2
- Loren & Ginger Janes as Couple in the Elevator (reprising their identical role from True Lies)
- Michael Lee Gogin (Brad Garrett, voice) as Short Rancor Guard
- Bruce Gray as The President
- John Kassir as Rancor Guard at Intercom
- Sally Stevens as Vocal Conductor/Singer
- Thuy Trang as Hawaiian-Dressed Waitress
- "Weird Al" Yankovic as Himself, in the title sequence
- Larry Walsh as Musician
- Rawle D. Lewis as Boatman #1
- Alexandra Paul as Woman in Murphy Bed
- Angela Visser as Gorgeous Blonde
- Katherine Moffat as Agent Moffat

== Production ==
=== Title sequence ===
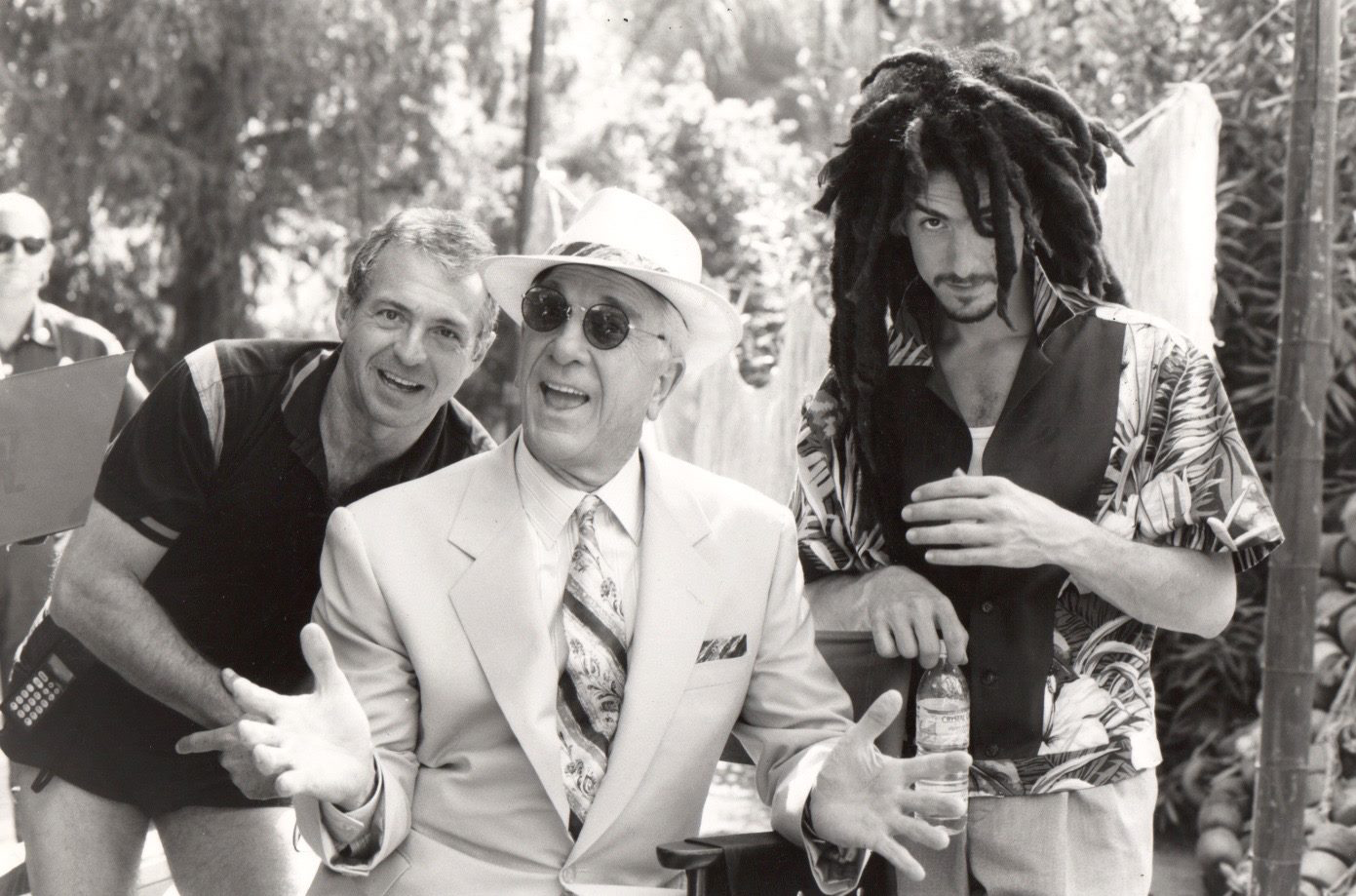
Konvitz and Nielsen in a photo from the set of the movie.

"Weird Al" Yankovic sings the title song and directs the title sequence. It is a parody of title sequences from the James Bond films designed by Maurice Binder, specifically 1965's Thunderball, complete with multiple coloured backgrounds, silhouetted figures, women dancing with guns, and "wavy" text. Additionally, an urban legend states that during the recording of the theme to Thunderball, Tom Jones held the song's final note long enough to pass out. Yankovic holds it so long that his head explodes. Originally, Yankovic had planned to loop the note to the required length, but in the studio, he discovered he was able to hold the note long enough that no looping was required. The sequence was later included on "Weird Al" Yankovic: The Ultimate Video Collection, although, for legal reasons, all credits and titles had to be taken out, excluding that of the film and of Yankovic himself.

=== Allegations of studio interference ===
In the decades since its initial release, director Rick Friedberg has spoken at length about his unhappy experience with the film, alleging rampant interference on the part of Disney that led to an "eviscerated" final product.

Disagreements between the filmmaker and the studio started during the casting process. Friedberg envisioned the villain as "international" a la those typical of the James Bond films. With this description in mind, he suggested Patrick Stewart and Nigel Hawthorne. Disney executives were unreceptive, firing back sarcastically "What is this, the British Royal Theatre Club? Cast a TV star!'". Friedberg explains "They didn't understand the kind of people I wanted. All they wanted was to copy Zucker-Abrahams. All they wanted was ex-TV stars from the 70s, 80s, 90s.'". Andy Griffith was ultimately cast as General Rancor.

A major point of contention during production was Spy Hard's intended target audience. While Disney insisted that Spy Hard appeal to as wide a demographic as possible (with a particular emphasis on children), Friedberg maintained that their core demographic was males in their early to late teens. Friedberg was forced to cut or rewrite entire set-pieces if Disney deemed them "too sophisticated" for young audiences. Recalling his exchanges with Disney executives, Friedberg said, "The primary thing they did which is the most painful was that they cut all of the good dialogue and all the story. I said 'No matter how funny this is, no matter what it parodies, it has to have a storyline'. They said 'Nobody gives a shit about the story - all they care about is jokes.'"

Late in production, with the film one day behind schedule, Friedberg claims Disney removed him as director and hired a replacement to conduct reshoots. Now unofficially working in a consultant capacity, Friedberg was sent the dailies from the reshoots, which he said were "all terrible". Final editing on Spy Hard occurred without Friedberg's involvement. Following advice from Naked Gun co-screenwriter Jim Abrahams, Disney was determined to bring Spy Hard in at a lean 84-minute running time. Friedberg says Disney refused to budge from this number and made extensive cuts to his 96-minute original version, resulting in continuity errors and a lack of narrative comprehension. The running time for Spy Hard's eventual theatrical release, before closing credits, was 77 minutes.

Interviewed on a 2022 podcast, when asked to name his favourite moment or scene from the film, Friedberg admitted, "I don't think there is a single one. I can't watch it. Its too painful for me when I see what was altered or what was cut."

== Release ==
=== Box office ===
The film opened at number 3 at the US box office with $10,448,420 behind Mission: Impossible's opening weekend and Twister's third. It eventually grossed $26,960,191 in the United States and Canada. Internationally, it did much better, grossing $57.2 million for a worldwide total of $84 million.

== Reception ==
=== Critical response ===
On Rotten Tomatoes, the film holds an approval rating of 7% based on 41 reviews, and an average rating of 3.6/10. The site's critics consensus states: "Leslie Nielsen's comic gifts are undisputed, but Spy Hard's lazy script and slapdash direction fail to take advantage of them." On Metacritic, the film has a weighted average score of 25 out of 100, based on 13 critics, indicating "generally unfavorable reviews". Audiences surveyed by CinemaScore gave the film a grade of "C+" on an A+ to F scale.

James Berardinelli of ReelViews wrote: "Director Rick Friedberg [...] has crafted a dreadfully unfunny comedy that takes Naked Gun-like sketches and rehashes them without a whit of style or energy. ... For movie-after-movie, Leslie Nielsen has milked this same personality, and it's starting to wear very thin. As affable as the actor is, there's just nothing left in this caricature. However, while Spy Hard might have worked better with, say, Roger Moore in the title role (his 007 was a parody towards the end, anyway), Nielsen's performance is only a small part of a massively-flawed production. Hard is the operative word here, because, even at just eighty-one minutes, this movie is unbelievably difficult to sit through."

Stephen Holden of The New York Times wrote: "Spy Hard is never funnier than during its opening credit sequence in which "Weird Al" Yankovic bellows his parody of the brassy theme song from Goldfinger, while obese cartoon silhouettes swim across the screen. ... Instead of building sustained comic set pieces, it takes a machine-gun approach to humor. Without looking at where it's aiming, it opens fire and sprays comic bullets in all directions, trusting that a few will hit the bull's-eye. A few do, but many more don't. ... Around the halfway point, Spy Hard begins to run out of ideas and becomes a series of crude, rambunctious parodies of other films. ... When Spy Hard abruptly ends after only 81 minutes, you sense that it has used up every last round of available ammunition. It was simply exhausted and couldn't move another inch."

Mick LaSalle of San Francisco Chronicle wrote: "It's done in the style of the Zucker-Abrahams-Zucker Naked Gun series, but although the style is there, the jokes aren't. Spy Hard relies on silly slapstick, takeoffs of recent films and the shock effect of celebrity cameos. But all that exertion doesn't add up to more than a handful of laughs. ... The story is too weak to work even as a clothesline for gags. Spy Hard eschews a coherent story and instead just strings together movie takeoffs. ... Nielsen, with his expert deadpan and sense of comic timing, creates the illusion of humor – for about 15 minutes. Thanks to him, what could have been an unbearable experience becomes merely empty. Still, he can't work miracles, and nothing short of a miracle could have made Spy Hard worth seeing."

Stephen Hunter of The Baltimore Sun gave the film a negative review, writing that the film is "more of a parody of a parody than a parody" and in particular criticizing director Rick Friedberg, asking, "[w]as this poor guy ever funny?"

Marcia Gay Harden wasn't a fan of the film itself as well:

Ugh. I hated doing that movie. [Laughs.] It was, I thought, going to be an opportunity to have a lot of fun, but it was just chaos and, uh, not so much fun. And not so funny. I mean, Leslie [Nielsen] was great, but it was really his show, and it was just… very chaotic. Behind schedule, over budget. People mention her to me, but I've never really seen the movie. All I know is that she was supposed to be sexy, and I don't know if she even was.

— Marcia Gay Harden
