= Stupid Little Golf Video =

1997 film by Peter Hayman

- DVD cover
- Directed by: Peter Hayman
- Written by: Henry Beard
- Produced by: Chris Mercer
- Starring: Leslie Nielsen; Bob Donner; John Boswell
- Edited by: Su Van Slyke
- Distributed by: Bridge Pictures
- Release date: March 24, 1998
- Running time: 51 minutes
- Country: United States
- Language: English

Stupid Little Golf Video (released as Leslie Nielsen's Stupid Little Golf Video in the United States) is the third and last of the how-to-golf-badly trilogy, following Bad Golf Made Easier and Bad Golf My Way. As of 2019 it is the only one that has been released on DVD. Nielsen's wife Barberee Earl Nielsen makes a cameo as a lady golfer. The film was shot at the Banff Springs Hotel & Golf Course in Banff, Alberta, Canada, and Los Angeles, California.

== Cast ==
- Leslie Nielsen as himself
- Bob Donner as His Trusted Caddie
- John Boswell as The Unsuspecting Golfer
- Barbaree Earl Nielsen as Lady Golfer 1
- Stephanie Faracy as Amy
- Eric Norris as Golfer
- Kyle Thomas as Mike
- Pauline Burns as Lady Golfer 2
- Paul Gadd as The Weatherman
- Doug Wood as The Golfer/Actor
