= Leslie Nielsen =

Canadian-American actor (1926–2010)

Leslie Nielsen OC
- Nielsen in 1982
- Born: Leslie William Nielsen; February 11, 1926; Regina, Saskatchewan, Canada
- Died: November 28, 2010 (aged 84); Fort Lauderdale, Florida, U.S.
- Resting place: Evergreen Cemetery, Fort Lauderdale, Florida, U.S.
- Citizenship: United States; Canada
- Education: Neighborhood Playhouse School of the Theatre; Lorne Greene Academy of Radio Arts
- Occupations: Actor; comedian; producer
- Years active: 1950–2010
- Notable work: Forbidden Planet (1956); The Poseidon Adventure (1972); Airplane! (1980); Police Squad! (1982); The Naked Gun (1988, 1991, 1994)
- Spouses: Monica Boyar (m. 1950; div. 1956); Alisande Ullman (m. 1958; div. 1973); Brooks Oliver (m. 1981; div. 1983); Barbaree Earl (m. 2001)
- Children: 2
- Relatives: Erik Nielsen (brother); Jean Hersholt (half-uncle)
- Military career
- Allegiance: Canada
- Branch: Royal Canadian Air Force
- Service years: 1943–1945
- Conflicts: World War II

Leslie William Nielsen (February 11, 1926 – November 28, 2010) was a Canadian-American actor and comedian. With a career spanning 60 years, he appeared in more than 100 films and 150 television programs, portraying more than 220 characters.

Nielsen made his acting debut in 1950, appearing in 46 live television programs that year. He made his film debut in 1956, with supporting roles in several dramas, westerns and romance films produced from the 1950s to 1970s. Although his performances in films such as Forbidden Planet (1956) and The Poseidon Adventure (1972) gave him standing as a dramatic actor, during the 1980s, Nielsen gained recognition for his deadpan comedy roles after being cast for the Zucker, Abrahams and Zucker comedy film Airplane! (1980).

In his comedy roles, he specialized in portraying characters oblivious to and complicit in their absurd surroundings. His performance in Airplane! marked a turning point which made him "the Olivier of spoofs", according to film critic Roger Ebert, and led to further success in the genre, starring in The Naked Gun film series, based on his earlier short-lived television series Police Squad! (1982).

Nielsen received a variety of accolades, and was inducted onto both Canada's Walk of Fame and the Hollywood Walk of Fame. He was ascended an Officer of the Order of Canada in 2001.

== Early life ==
Nielsen was born on February 11, 1926, in Regina, Saskatchewan. His mother, Mabel Elizabeth (née Davies), was an immigrant from Wales, and his father, Ingvard Eversen Nielsen (1900–1975), was a Danish-born constable in the Royal Canadian Mounted Police. Nielsen's elder brother, Erik Nielsen (1924–2008), was a long-time Canadian Member of Parliament, cabinet minister, and Deputy Prime Minister of Canada from 1984 to 1986. He also had a half-brother, Gilbert Nielsen, from his father's other relationship.

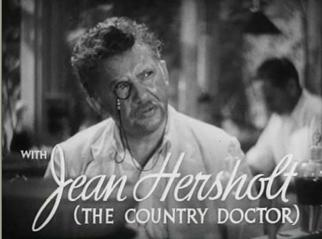
Nielsen's half-uncle Jean Hersholt (pictured here in the 1936 film His Brother's Wife) inspired him to become an actor.

Nielsen's half-uncle Jean Hersholt was an actor known for his portrayal of Dr. Christian in a radio series of that title, and the subsequent television series and films. In a 1994 Boston Globe article, he explained: "I did learn very early that when I would mention my uncle, people would look at me as if I were the biggest liar in the world. Then I would take them home and show them 8-by-10 glossies, and things changed quite drastically. So I began to think that maybe this acting business was not a bad idea, much as I was very shy about it and certainly without courage regarding it. My uncle died not too long after I was in a position to know him. I regret that I had not a chance to know him better."

As a child, Nielsen lived with his family in Fort Norman (now Tulita) in the Northwest Territories, where his father was with the Royal Canadian Mounted Police. They moved to Edmonton in 1930. His father was an abusive man who beat his wife and sons, and Leslie longed to escape. Following graduation from Victoria High School (later renamed Victoria School of the Arts) in Edmonton, he enlisted in the Royal Canadian Air Force at age 17 in 1943, though he was legally deaf (he wore hearing aids most of his life). There he trained as an aerial gunner during World War II but was never sent overseas. Upon the war's end, he was discharged and worked briefly as a disc jockey at a Calgary, Alberta, radio station, before enrolling at the Lorne Greene Academy of Radio Arts in Toronto.

While studying in Toronto, Nielsen received a scholarship to the Neighborhood Playhouse. He noted, "I couldn't refuse, but I must say when you come from the land of the snow goose, the moose, and wool to New York, you're bringing every ton of hayseed and country bumpkin that you packed. As long as I didn't open my mouth, I felt a certain security. But I always thought I was going to be unmasked: 'OK, pack your stuff'. 'Well, what's the matter?'. 'We've discovered you have no talent; we're shipping you back to Canada'."

He moved to New York City for his scholarship, studying theatre and music at the Neighborhood Playhouse, while performing in summer stock theatre. Afterward, he attended the Actors Studio, until his first television appearance in 1950 on an episode of Studio One, alongside Charlton Heston, for which he was paid $75 (equivalent to $1,000 in 2025).

== Career ==
=== Early career ===
"It was a strange era, the tail end of the golden age. A time when the Tiffany's of filmmakers was burying its head in the sand and trying to pretend that this new medium [television] was not happening."

— Nielsen reflecting on the era when he started acting

Nielsen's career began in dramatic roles on television during "Television's Golden Age", appearing in 46 live programs in 1950 alone. He said there "was very little gold, we only got $75 or $100 per show". He narrated documentaries and commercials and most of his early work as a dramatic actor was uneventful. Hal Erickson of Allmovie noted that "much of Nielsen's early work was undistinguished; he was merely a handsome leading man in an industry overstocked with handsome leading men".

In 1952 Nielsen made his Broadway debut as Petty Officer Herbert in Seagulls Over Sorrento, a short-lived transfer from the West End. In 1956, he made his feature film debut in the Michael Curtiz-directed musical, The Vagabond King. In the Seattle Post-Intelligencer, Nielsen remembered Curtiz as "a sadist, a charming sadist, but a sadist". Nielsen called this film The Vagabond Turkey. Though the film was not a success, producer Nicholas Nayfack offered him an audition for the science-fiction film Forbidden Planet, resulting in Nielsen's taking a long contract with Metro-Goldwyn-Mayer (MGM).

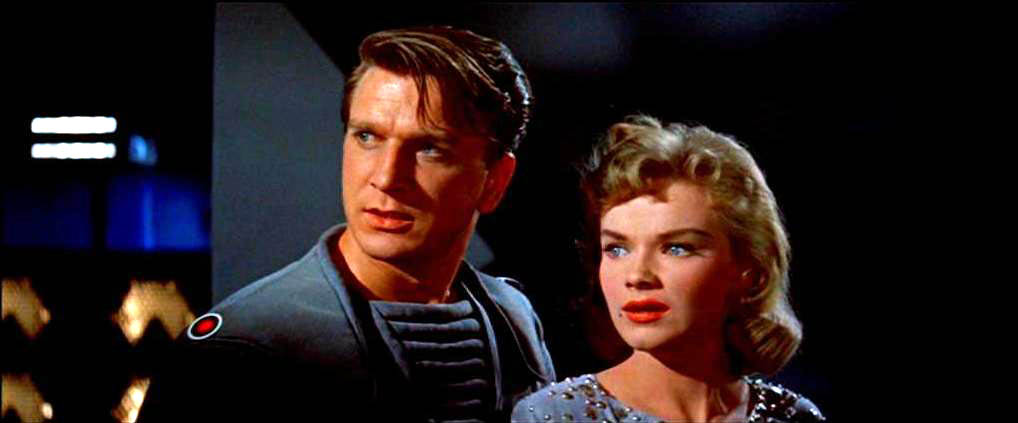
Nielsen and Anne Francis in his second film, Forbidden Planet (1956). Nielsen: "Supposedly a science-fiction version of Shakespeare's The Tempest, it was all about the id, or something like that. Who knows? The Trekkies today regard it as the forerunner of Star Trek. I just had to wear a tight uniform and make eyes at Anne Francis. I was pretty thin back then."

Forbidden Planet became an instant success, and roles in other MGM films such as Ransom! (1956), The Opposite Sex (1956) and Hot Summer Night (1957) followed. In 1957, Nielsen won the lead role opposite Debbie Reynolds in the romantic comedy Tammy and the Bachelor for Universal Pictures, which, as a Chicago Tribune critic wrote in 1998, made people consider him a dramatic actor and handsome romantic lead. Dissatisfied with the films he was offered, calling the studios "a Tiffany, which had forgotten how to make silver", he left MGM after auditioning for Messala in the 1959 Ben-Hur. Stephen Boyd got the role.

After leaving the studios, Nielsen landed the lead role in the Disney miniseries The Swamp Fox, as American Revolutionary War hero Francis Marion. In a 1988 interview, he reflected on the series: "That was a great experience, because the Disney people didn't do their shows like everyone else, knocking out an episode a week. ... We only had to do an episode a month, and the budgets were extremely high for TV at that time. We had location shooting rather than cheap studio backdrops, and very authentic costumes." Eight episodes were produced and aired between 1959 and 1961.

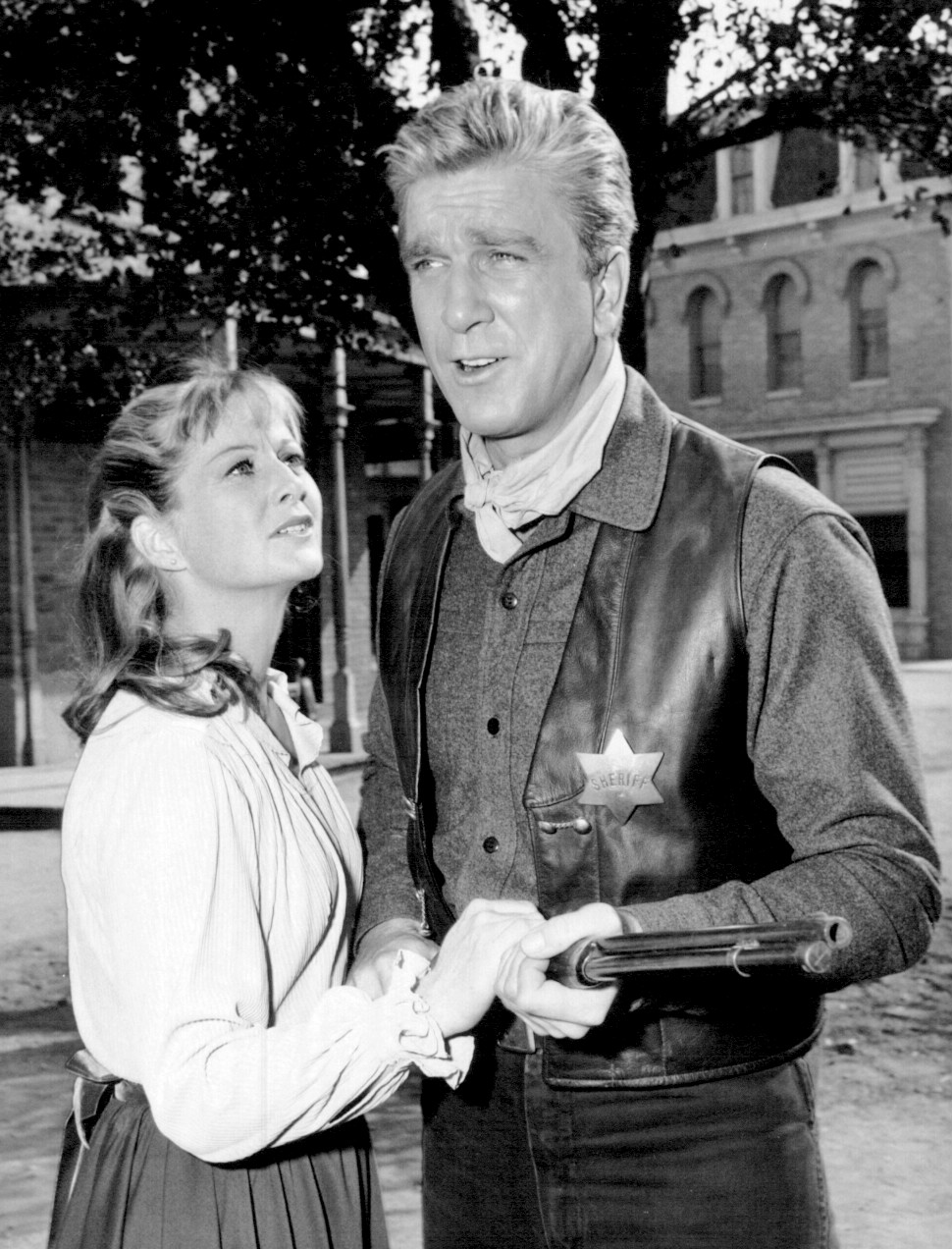
Nielsen and Nancy Malone in Bonanza (1967)

His television appearances include Justice, The Swamp Fox, Alfred Hitchcock Presents, Voyage to the Bottom of the Sea, Wagon Train, Gunsmoke, Columbo, The Virginian and The Wild Wild West. In 1961, he was the lead in a Los Angeles police drama called The New Breed. He guest-starred in a 1964 episode of Daniel Boone with Fess Parker in a minor but credited role. In 1965 he guest-starred in 19 episodes of Peyton Place in two roles, Vincent & Kenneth Markham, identical twins with distinctly different personalities.

In 1968, he had a major role in the pilot for the police series Hawaii Five-O and appeared in one of the seventh-season episodes. In 1969, he had the leading role as a police officer in The Bold Ones: The Protectors.

In 1972, Nielsen appeared in the supporting role as the captain of the doomed ocean liner SS Poseidon in the disaster epic, The Poseidon Adventure. He also starred in William Girdler's 1977 action film, Project: Kill. He was cast in the 1979 Canadian disaster film City on Fire, in which he portrayed a corrupt mayor. In 1980, he guest-starred as Sinclair in the CBS TV miniseries The Chisholms.

=== Comedy: Airplane! and The Naked Gun ===
In an early comedic appearance, Nielsen appeared on M*A*S*H in 1973 as the title character in "The Ringbanger".

Nielsen's supporting role of Dr. Rumack in Zucker, Abrahams, and Zucker's (ZAZ) 1980's Airplane! was a turning point in his career. The film, a parody of disaster films such as Zero Hour! and Airport, was based on building a comedy around "serious" actors better known for their dramatic roles. Other "straight" stars in the film included Robert Stack, Peter Graves, and Lloyd Bridges.

Nielsen's deadpan delivery contrasted with the absurdity surrounding him. When asked, "Surely you can't be serious?", his curt, now iconic response was: "I am serious. And don't call me Shirley." In several later interviews, he reflected on the line: "I thought it was amusing, but it never occurred to me that it was going to become a trademark. It's such a surprise ... the thing comes out, people say, 'What did he say?!'" Nielsen said he was "pleased and honoured that [he] had a chance to deliver that line". As of 2010, the comedic exchange was at number 79 on the American Film Institute's AFI's 100 Years...100 Movie Quotes.

The American Film Institute included the film in its list of the top ten comedy films of all time in 2008, and a 2007 survey in the United Kingdom judged it the second-greatest comedy film of all time after Monty Python's Life of Brian. In 2012, Empire voted it number one in the 50 Funniest Comedies Ever poll. Critics praised the film, which also proved a long-term success with audiences. In 2010, Airplane! was selected for preservation in the National Film Registry by the Library of Congress.

The directors cast Nielsen for his ability to play like "a fish in water", saying: "You could have cast funny people and done it with everybody winking, goofing off, and silly ... we wanted people to be oblivious to the comedy." For Nielsen, Airplane! marked a career shift from dramatic roles to deadpan comedy. When it was suggested his role in Airplane! was against type, Nielsen protested that he had "always been cast against type before", and that comedy was what he always wanted to do. In 1982, ZAZ cast Nielsen in a similar style, in their ABC TV series Police Squad!. The spoof series introduced Nielsen as Lt. Frank Drebin, the stereotypical police officer modeled after serious characters, such as Joe Friday, in earlier police TV dramas.

The opening sequence for Police Squad! was based on the 1950s show M Squad, which starred Lee Marvin, and opened with footage of a police car roving through a dark urban setting with a big band playing a jazz song in the background. The Hank Simms voice-over and the show's organization into acts with an epilogue was homage to Quinn Martin police dramas including The Fugitive, The Streets of San Francisco, Barnaby Jones, The F.B.I., Dan August and Cannon. Nielsen portrayed a serious character whose one-liners appeared accidental next to the pratfalls and sight gags that were happening around him. Nielsen received an Emmy Award nomination for his performance, and despite positive critical reviews, the series was cancelled after just six episodes.

Six years after the cancellation of Police Squad!, the film The Naked Gun: From the Files of Police Squad! returned Nielsen to his role as Frank Drebin. It involved a ruthless drug king using hypnosis to attempt an assassination of Queen Elizabeth II. Nielsen did many of his own stunts: "You have an idea of how you're going to do something, and it's your vision ... unless you do it, it really doesn't stand a chance." This movie grossed over $152 million and was well received by critics. Ebert's 3 1/2–star review (out of four) noted: "You laugh, and then you laugh at yourself for laughing."

The Naked Gun spawned two sequels: The Naked Gun 2½: The Smell of Fear (1991) and Naked Gun 33 1/3: The Final Insult (1994). The Naked Gun 2½ grossed more than the original, with $192 million, while 33 1/3 grossed $132 million. Nielsen remained open to a fourth Naked Gun film, although he doubted that it would be produced — "I don't think so", he said in 2005. "If there hasn't been one by now, I doubt it. I think it would be wonderful."

Nielsen briefly appeared on the World Wrestling Federation program in the summer of 1994 on WWF Monday Night Raw, spoofing the role of Frank Drebin. Nielsen and Naked Gun co-star George Kennedy were hired as sleuths to unravel the mystery of the Undertaker, who had disappeared at January's Royal Rumble event. At SummerSlam 1994, in a Naked Gun parody, they were hot on the case (in fact, they were standing on a case). Although they did not find the Undertaker, the case had been closed (the literal case had been shut), thus they solved the mystery. In 1990, Nielsen appeared as a Frank Drebin type character in advertisements for Red Rock Cider in the United Kingdom. In 1992, Nielsen appeared in the series finale for The Golden Girls as Lucas, who was Blanche's uncle and Dorothy's boyfriend.

Nielsen's few dramatic roles following his comedic success in Airplane! included the horror films Prom Night (1980) and Creepshow (1982). He appeared as a dramatic and unsympathetic character in the 1986 comedy Soul Man. His final dramatic role was as Allen Green, a violent client killed in self-defense by prostitute Claudia Draper (Barbra Streisand) in Martin Ritt's courtroom drama Nuts (1987).

=== Later comedies ===
After Airplane! and The Naked Gun, Nielsen portrayed similarly styled roles in a number of other films. These mostly emulated the style of The Naked Gun with varying success and often targeted specific films; many were panned by critics, and most performed poorly. Repossessed (1990) and 2001: A Space Travesty (2001) are parodies of The Exorcist and 2001: A Space Odyssey, respectively. Both attempted absurd comedy, but were poorly received. Even a leading role in a Mel Brooks comic horror, Dracula: Dead and Loving It, failed to generate much box-office excitement, although it did gain a following in a later release to video. Both 1996's Spy Hard and 1998's Wrongfully Accused, a parody of James Bond films and The Fugitive, were popular on video, but not well received by critics.

His attempt at family and children's comedies met additional criticism. He appeared as Santa Claus in the Christmas comedy All I Want for Christmas (1991), a film that was at best only moderately successful at the box office, and had bad reviews. Surf Ninjas (1993) and Mr. Magoo (1997) also had scathing reviews. Several critics were disappointed that Nielsen's role in Surf Ninjas was only "an extended cameo" and Chris Hicks recommended that viewers "avoid any comedy that features Leslie Nielsen outside of the Naked Gun series". Jeff Miller of the Houston Chronicle panned Mr. Magoo, a live-action remake of the 1950s cartoon: "I'm supposed to suggest how the film might be better, but I can't think of anything to say other than to make the film again."

Nielsen's first major success since The Naked Gun came in a supporting role in Scary Movie 3 (2003). His appearance as President Harris led to a second appearance in its sequel, Scary Movie 4 (2006). This was the first time Nielsen had reprised a character since Frank Drebin. In one scene, Nielsen appeared almost nude, and reviewer James Berardinelli referred to the scene as putting "the 'scary' in Scary Movie 4".

=== Video, stage, and celebrity productions ===
Nielsen also produced instructional golf videos, which are not presented in a serious style, beginning with 1993's Bad Golf Made Easier. The videos combine comedy with golf techniques. The series spawned two additional sequels, Bad Golf My Way (1994) and Stupid Little Golf Video (1997). Nielsen also co-wrote a fictional autobiography titled The Naked Truth. The book portrays Nielsen as a popular actor with a long history of prestigious films.

In his 80s, Nielsen performed serious roles on screen and stage (such as his one-man theatre show Darrow, in which he played Clarence Darrow), as well as providing voice-overs and appearances for commercials (including spots for a credit union in Arizona, where he owned a secondary residence), cartoons such as Zeroman, where he had the leading role/voice, children's shows, such as Pumper Pups, which he narrated, and comedic film roles. The sibling relationship with his elder brother, the Honourable Erik Nielsen, a former Deputy Prime Minister of Canada, served as the premise of an HBO mockumentary entitled The Canadian Conspiracy, in which Leslie Nielsen appeared along with other prominent Canadian-born media personalities. He was a celebrity contestant on CBS's Gameshow Marathon, where he played The Price Is Right, Let's Make a Deal, Beat the Clock, and Press Your Luck for charity.

=== Final acting years ===
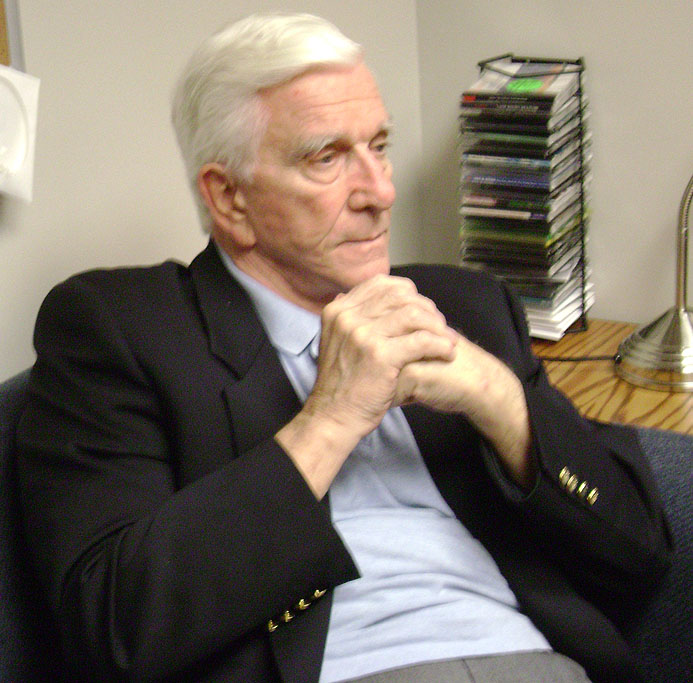
Nielsen in March 2009 at DeSales University in Center Valley, Pennsylvania

Beginning in February 2007, Nielsen began playing a small role as a doctor in the humorous yet educational television show Doctor*Ology. The show chronicles real-life medical techniques and technology on the Discovery Channel. Nielsen said:

There are any number of things that you think about when you ponder if you hadn't been an actor, what would you be, and I've always said I'd like to be an astronaut or a doctor. I have such admiration for doctors. I just don't know how you go around to thank them enough for coming up with the world's most remarkable new discoveries.

In 2007, Nielsen starred in the drama Music Within. In 2008, he portrayed a version of Uncle Ben for Superhero Movie, a spoof of superhero films. He then appeared in the 2008 parody An American Carol, which David Zucker directed, produced, and co-wrote. He appeared in the 2009 parody Stan Helsing. Nielsen portrayed the doctor in the Spanish horror comedy Spanish Movie, a spoof comedy like Scary Movie, but making fun of popular Spanish films.

Nielsen appeared in more than 100 films and 150 television episodes, portraying more than 220 characters. From at least the early 1970s, he was a television commercial spokesperson for the Bank of Montreal, Ford, Shell and Dollar Rent-A-Car, among many others; his earlier spots took advantage of his serious and authoritative persona, while later commercials were more humorous, mirroring his transition to comedic acting roles.

== Personal life ==
"I'm afraid if I don't keep moving, they're going to catch me ... I am 81 years old and I want to see what's around the corner, and I don't see any reason in the world not to keep working. But I am starting to value my down time a great deal because I am realizing there might be other things to do that I am overlooking."

— Nielsen reflecting on his career in 2007

Nielsen married four times: to nightclub singer Monica Boyar (1950–1956), Alisande Ullman (1958–1973), Brooks Oliver (1981–1983), and Barbaree Earl (2001 – his death in 2010). He had two daughters from his second marriage.

Nielsen often played golf. He joked, "I have no goals or ambition. I do, however, wish to work enough to maintain whatever celebrity status I have so that they will continue to invite me to golf tournaments." His interest in the sport led him to comedic instructional films.

Nielsen was a practical joker and known for pranking people with a portable hand-controlled fart machine. His epitaph reads "Let 'er rip", a final reference to his favorite practical joke.

In his later years, Nielsen and his wife Barbaree resided between homes in Fort Lauderdale, Florida, and Paradise Valley, Arizona.

=== Illness and death ===
Nielsen was legally deaf and wore hearing aids for most of his life. Because of this, he supported the Better Hearing Institute. Later in life, he had knee osteoarthritis. He participated in an educational video from Arthritis Research Canada, demonstrating the physical examination of a patient with knee osteoarthritis.

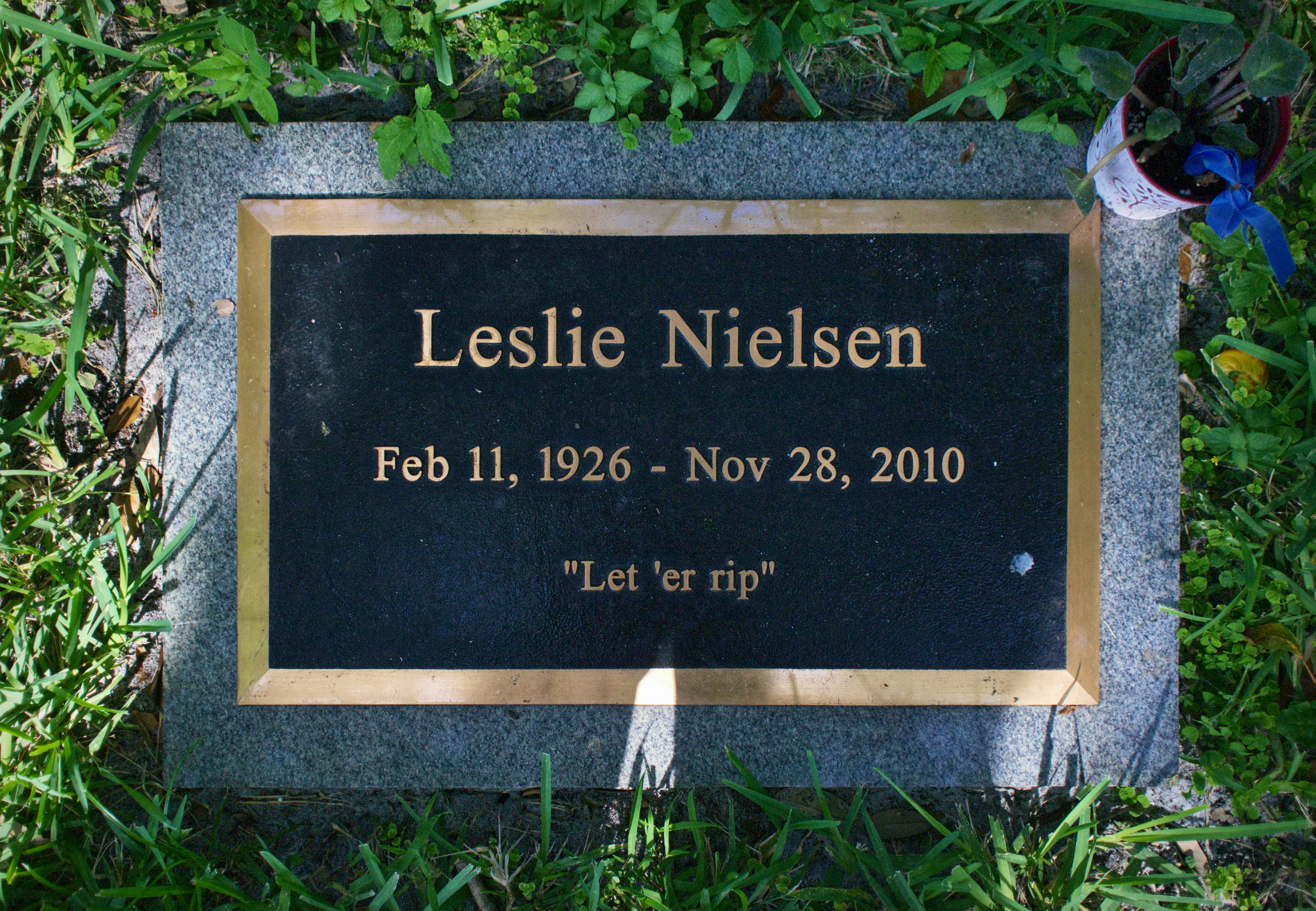
Leslie Nielsen's gravestone bearing his epitaph, a final reference to his favorite practical joke, a fart machine

In November 2010, Nielsen was admitted to Holy Cross Hospital, Fort Lauderdale, Florida. On November 28, his nephew Doug told Winnipeg radio station CJOB that he died in his sleep from pneumonia around 5:30 p.m. EST, aged 84, surrounded by family and friends.

Nielsen's body is interred in Fort Lauderdale's Evergreen Cemetery. As a final bit of humour, he chose "Let 'er rip" as his epitaph. On December 7, 2010, his funeral was held in Fort Lauderdale, Florida, during which the Naked Gun theme played.

== Achievements ==
Among his awards, in 1995 Nielsen received UCLA's Jack Benny Award. In 1988, he became the 1,884th personality to receive a star on the Hollywood Walk of Fame at 6541 Hollywood Blvd. In 2001, he was inducted into Canada's Walk of Fame. The following year, he was made an Officer of the Order of Canada, although he was also a naturalized American citizen.

Despite Nielsen's American citizenship, he maintained his Canadian heritage: "There's no way you can be a Canadian and think you can lose it ... Canadians are a goodly group. They are very aware of caring and helping." On May 19, 2005, when Queen Elizabeth II visited his native Saskatchewan during the province's centennial gala, she was introduced to Nielsen.

In 1997, a Golden Palm Star on the Palm Springs, California, Walk of Stars was dedicated to him.

On February 20, 2002, Nielsen was named an honorary citizen of West Virginia and an Ambassador of Mountain State Goodwill. Nielsen visited the state many times to speak and visit friends. In 2003, in honour of Nielsen, Grant MacEwan College named its school of communications after him. Also in 2003, the Alliance of Canadian Cinema, Television and Radio Artists awarded him the ACTRA Award of Excellence.

== Bibliography ==
- 1993: The Naked Truth
- 1995: Leslie Nielsen's Stupid Little Golf Book with Henry Beard
- 1996: Bad Golf My Way with Henry Beard
