= Airport (film series) =

1970s American film series

- Directed by: George Seaton (1); Jack Smight (2); Jerry Jameson (3); David Lowell Rich (4)
- Screenplay by: George Seaton (1); Don Ingalls (2); Michael Scheff (3); David Spector (3); Eric Roth (4)
- Based on: Airport (1968 novel) by Arthur Hailey
- Produced by: Ross Hunter (1); William Frye (2–3); Jennings Lang (4)
- Starring: Burt Lancaster; George Kennedy; Charlton Heston; Jack Lemmon; Alain Delon
- Cinematography: Ernest Laszlo (1); Philip H. Lathrop (2–4)
- Edited by: Stuart Gilmore (1); J. Terry Williams (2–3); Robert Watts (3); Dorothy Spencer (4)
- Music by: Alfred Newman (1); John Cacavas (2–3); Lalo Schifrin (4)
- Production company: Universal Pictures
- Release dates: March 5, 1970 (1); October 18, 1974 (2); March 11, 1977 (3); August 17, 1979 (4)
- Country: United States
- Language: English
- Budget: $33.2 million
- Box office: $387.5 million

Airport is a 1970s film series consisting of four airplane-themed disaster films: Airport, Airport 1975, Airport '77 and The Concorde... Airport '79. They are based on the 1968 novel Airport by Arthur Hailey. The four films grossed $387.5 million worldwide, on a collective budget of $33.2 million.

The only actor who appeared in all four films is George Kennedy, in his recurring role of Joe Patroni, who progresses from a chief mechanic, to a vice president of operations, to a consultant, to an airline pilot.

== Films ==
Film	U.S. release date	Director	Screenwriter(s)	Story	Producers
Airport	March 5, 1970	George Seaton	George Seaton	—N/a	Ross Hunter
Airport 1975	October 18, 1974	Jack Smight	Don Ingalls	Don Ingalls	William Frye
Airport '77	March 11, 1977	Jerry Jameson	Michael Scheff, David Spector	H. A. L. Craig, Charles Kuenstle	William Frye
The Concorde... Airport '79	August 17, 1979	David Lowell Rich	Eric Roth	Jennings Lang	Jennings Lang

== Critical reception ==
The first Airport film from 1970 has been praised for the film's influence on the disaster genre and its "camp value". However, the movie's star, Burt Lancaster, said in a 1971 reaction to its ten Academy Award nominations that the film was "the biggest piece of junk ever made."

The New Yorker film critic Pauline Kael characterized Airport 1975 as "cut-rate swill", produced on a TV-movie budget by mercenary businessmen. Vincent Canby of The New York Times called it "a silly sequel with a 747".

In a review of Airport '77, a critic in The New York Times wrote that it "looks less like the work of a director and writers than like a corporate decision."

Variety′s review of The Concorde... Airport '79 called the film "Definitely not for sophisticates, 'Concorde' is a throwback to the old popcorn genre, and rather enjoyable at that" but noted that "unintentional comedy still seems the 'Airport' series' forte". The New York Times' critic Janet Maslin wrote disparagingly that "'Concorde' is enough to persuade anyone to stay on the ground."

Despite strong box office results in foreign markets, the fourth film did very poorly domestically and the franchise did not continue. A fifth film entitled Airport '82: UFO had been in early development stages with the intention to cash in on the success of science fiction films at the time and have George Kennedy return, however it did not proceed.

The 1980 comedy Airplane!, though more specifically a parody of the 1957 film Zero Hour! (itself a precursor to the Airport concept, with a screenplay by Hailey), was marketed as a spoof of the Airport series. It spawned its own follow-up, Airplane II: The Sequel, in 1982.

== Box office performance ==
Film	Release date	Box office gross			Budget	Reference
Film	Release date	United States/Canada	Other territories	Worldwide	Budget	Reference
Airport	May 29, 1970	$100,500,000	$27,900,000	$128,400,000	$10,200,000	
Airport 1975	October 18, 1974	$47,300,000	$55,700,000	$103,000,000	$3,000,000	
Airport '77	March 11, 1977	$30,000,000	$61,100,000	$91,100,000	$6,000,000	
The Concorde... Airport '79	August 17, 1979	$13,000,000	$52,000,000	$65,000,000	$14,000,000	
Total		$190,800,000	$196,700,000	$387,500,000	$33,200,000	

== See also ==
- List of feature film series with four entries
