= The Concorde... Airport '79 =

1979 American disaster film directed by David Lowell Rich

- Theatrical release poster
- Directed by: David Lowell Rich
- Screenplay by: Eric Roth
- Story by: Jennings Lang
- Based on: Characters by Arthur Hailey
- Produced by: Jennings Lang
- Starring: Alain Delon; Susan Blakely; Robert Wagner; Sylvia Kristel; George Kennedy; Eddie Albert; Bibi Andersson; Charo; Pierre Jalbert; John Davidson; Andrea Marcovicci; Martha Raye; Cicely Tyson; Jimmie Walker; David Warner
- Cinematography: Philip H. Lathrop
- Edited by: Dorothy Spencer
- Music by: Lalo Schifrin
- Production company: Universal Pictures
- Distributed by: Universal Pictures
- Release date: August 17, 1979
- Running time: 113 minutes
- Country: United States
- Language: English
- Budget: $14 million
- Box office: $65 million

The Concorde... Airport '79 (released in the UK as Airport '80: The Concorde) is a 1979 American disaster film, and the fourth and final installment of the Airport film series. It is directed by David Lowell Rich, produced by Jennings Lang, from a screenplay by Eric Roth and a story by Lang. The film's ensemble cast features George Kennedy, who appeared in all four films from the Airport series, along with Alain Delon, Susan Blakely, Robert Wagner, Sylvia Kristel, Eddie Albert, Bibi Andersson, Charo, Cicely Tyson, Jimmie Walker, David Warner, Mercedes McCambridge and Martha Raye.

Although critically panned and commercially unsuccessful in North America, the film was a financial hit internationally, grossing a total of $65 million on a $14 million budget.

== Plot ==
Kevin Harrison, a corrupt arms dealer, attempts to destroy an American-owned Concorde on its maiden flight after one of the passengers, reporter Maggie Whelan, learns of his weapons sales to communist countries during the Cold War.

The Concorde takes off from Charles de Gaulle Airport in Paris and lands at Dulles Airport outside Washington, D.C., despite being forced to perform a go-around when environmental protestors fly a hot air balloon into its approach path.

Maggie reports on the flight the following day, which leads to a story of Harrison and his Buzzard surface-to-air missile project. A man named Carl Parker claims to have documentation of illegal arms deals, but is shot by an assailant who chases Maggie before a passerby triggers a fire alarm, scaring the assailant away.

Maggie is told by Harrison that someone is framing him. He sends Maggie off in a limo, then plots to destroy the Concorde with Maggie on it by reprogramming an attack drone test to target the Concorde.

Capt. Joe Patroni and Capt. Paul Metrand board the Concorde. They are joined by Peter O'Neill, the 2nd officer and flight engineer.

Harrison surprises Maggie at the airline check-in desk to see her off. He asks whether the documents have shown up, but they have not. As he walks away, Parker's wife delivers the documents to Maggie. She reviews them and realizes that Harrison lied.

The Concorde departs for Paris. Unbeknownst to the flight crew, an off-course surface-to-air missile is headed for them. At his company headquarters, Harrison tells his controllers to alert the government. The USAF scrambles F-15 fighter jets to intercept the missile as it locks onto the Concorde. After evasive maneuvers by the Concorde, an F-15 destroys the missile.

As the Concorde approaches Europe, an F-4 Phantom II sent by Harrison engages the Concorde as French Air Force Mirage F1s scramble to help. The Concorde evades the F-4's missiles, but the explosion of one of them damages the plane's hydraulics. The Mirages shoot down the F-4 before the Concorde reaches the French coastline en route to Paris. Due to the damage, the plane lands at Le Bourget Airport instead of Charles de Gaulle. The Concorde barely stops at the last safety net. Metrand and Isabelle invite Patroni to dinner.

Harrison promises Maggie to go public with the documents but attempts to bribe her into revising his statement. After being paid by Harrison, a mechanic, Froelich, places a device in the Concorde's cargo door control unit, timed to open during flight.

As the passengers board, Froelich is at the security checkpoint when some of his money falls from his trouser leg. The X-ray technician attempts to return it, but Froelich runs off. On the runway, the Concorde's exhaust renders Froelich unconscious and scatters the money.

En route to Moscow, the automatic device opens the cargo door. Metrand sees the carpet tear down the middle of the aisle, signifying the fuselage is under tremendous stress and the aircraft is about to break apart. The cargo door is ripped off, causing a sudden decompression, damaging the aircraft and ripping a segment of the floor, knocking out the primary flight controls as the plane spirals towards the ground. The airline founder's seat lodges in the hole, acting as a plug. With only back-up systems available, the pilots attempt to fly to Innsbruck, Austria, for an emergency landing, but they are losing too much fuel. Metrand realizes they are flying towards a ski area he knows along the Alps in Patscherkofel; they could make a belly landing on a mountain-side.

The aircraft approaches the landing site while the ski patrol marks a runway, landing successfully. While passengers are being rescued, Maggie reports on the accident to a news reporter and mentions a major story she is about to release. Harrison, en route back to Washington, sees the newscast in his private plane and commits suicide. The last of the crew leaves the Concorde shortly before the fuselage explodes.

== Cast ==
- Alain Delon as Captain Paul Metrand
- Susan Blakely as Maggie Whelan
- Robert Wagner as Kevin Harrison
- Sylvia Kristel as Isabelle
- George Kennedy as Captain Joseph "Joe" Patroni
- Eddie Albert as Eli Sands
- Bibi Andersson as Francine
- Charo as Margarita
- Pierre Jalbert as Henri
- John Davidson as Robert Palmer
- Andrea Marcovicci as Alicia Rogov
- Martha Raye as Loretta
- Cicely Tyson as Elaine
- Jimmie Walker as Boise
- David Warner as Peter O'Neill
- Mercedes McCambridge as Nelli
- Avery Schreiber as Russian Coach Markov
- Sybil Danning as Amy
- Monica Lewis as Gretchen
- Nicolas Coster as Dr. Stone
- Robin Gammell as Halpern
- Ed Begley Jr. as Rescuer #1
- Jon Cedar as Froelich
- Macon McCalman as Carl Parker
- Kathleen Maguire as Mary Parker
- Marneen Fields as American Olympic Athlete
- Harry Shearer as Jeffrey Marx, The Announcer (voice)

== Production ==
It took producer Jennings Lang a number of years to get permission from Air France to use the Concorde. Air France requested some changes to the story and dialogue. Lang argued the film was not a direct sequel because it used different characters and settings, apart from George Kennedy whose character Joe Patroni was promoted to pilot. The plot to bring down the Concorde in the second act of the film was very similar to the Turkish Airlines Flight 981 accident six years earlier, in that an explosive decompression (and subsequent loss of control) was caused by the cargo hold door blowing off in flight, although it is not known if this was coincidence, or indeed the writers' direct inspiration.

The film was originally going to be called Airport '79 - the Concorde but Lang decided to rename it so it would not be confused with Airport 1975 and Airport '77. In October 1978 Universal announced that filming would start in November. Susan Blakely appeared in the film as the first in a three-picture deal she signed with Universal following the success of Rich Man, Poor Man. Parts of the film were also shot in Alta, Utah. Filming had finished by February 1979.

Sylvia Kristel wrote in her memoirs that Alain Delon was unhappy with the size of his trailer and insisted he be given David Lowell Rich's trailer, which was larger. Rich complained to Lang, who supported Delon. Kristel wrote that towards the end the shoot, the director started "being overtly misogynistic. He treats me badly, shouting, making me repeat things all the time for no reason."

The special effects were produced by Universal Hartland, the visual effects house of Universal Studios Hollywood which also worked on the television shows Battlestar Galactica and Buck Rogers in the 25th Century. The film utilised blue screen compositing for filming of flight scenes involving fibreglass model aircraft and it was found that the white Concorde model would reflect the blue screen which interfered with the compositing process. Painting the model in a yellow primer-style paint colour stopped reflection of the blue screen and produced perfect results, with the yellow being filtered out by colour balancing later on.

The model makers also cut into shape small number eleven exacto knife blades which were very strong and sharp. These shaped blades were used as tiny antenna details on the model aircraft and served as a warning to people who were handling the models to be more careful and stop knocking them off.

== Release ==
=== Television premiere ===
For the film's May 1982 network television premiere on ABC, additional footage was added to expand the film's running time so it could be shown in a three-hour time slot.

== Reception ==
=== Critical reception ===
The film was the recipient of mostly negative reviews by critics upon its release, and years later holds an approval rating of 20% on the film review aggregator Rotten Tomatoes based on 10 reviews.

Vincent Canby of The New York Times wrote, "The Concorde – Airport '79 is – how should I put it? – not the best of the series, but to say that it's the worst is to convey the wrong impression. In this case, worst is best." Variety′s review called the film "Definitely not for sophisticates, Concorde is a throwback to the old popcorn genre, and rather enjoyable at that" but noted that "unintentional comedy still seems the Airport series' forte". Stu Goldstein of Boxoffice graded the film as "Poor" and called it "so silly it's actually entertaining." David Ansen of Newsweek wrote, "You have to respect a movie so single-mindedly dedicated to High Silliness. The advantage of its blithe disregard for plausibility is a plot that zips along at such breakneck pace that the audience is too busy counting the holes in the Concorde to question the holes in the plot." Gene Siskel of the Chicago Tribune gave the film one star out of four and called the story "ludicrous." Sheila Benson of the Los Angeles Times wrote, "The disaster they face is as contrived as the characters. You never believe for a second that these passengers are in any danger, beyond getting airsick or mussing their hair." Gary Arnold of The Washington Post called the film "nearly as funny as The Big Bus, albeit unwittingly."

Film critic Roger Ebert highlighted the film in his book I Hated, Hated, Hated This Movie, deriding the science in the scene in which Patroni fires a flare gun out of the cockpit window. It is also listed in Golden Raspberry Awards founder John Wilson's book The Official Razzie Movie Guide as one of The 100 Most Enjoyably Bad Movies Ever Made.

=== Box office ===
Produced on a budget of $14 million, it earned a little over $13 million in the United States and Canada, thus ending the enormous financial success of the Airport films. Internationally the film still performed well, grossing $52 million for a worldwide total of $65 million.

== Aircraft history ==
The Concorde aircraft used in the film first flew on January 31, 1975, and was registered as F-WTSC to the Aérospatiale aircraft company. It would be re-registered by Aérospatiale as F-BTSC and leased to Air France in 1976. In 1989, this Concorde carried Pope John Paul II.

On July 25, 2000, F-BTSC, as Air France Flight 4590, was hit by runway debris on takeoff, igniting the leaking fuel on the wing's fuel tank (part of the fuselage), and causing the aircraft to crash in the small French town of Gonesse, killing all 109 passengers and crew on board, as well as four people on the ground. At the time of the accident, F-BTSC had logged 11,989 hours and 4,873 cycles.

== See also ==
- Airport
- Airport 1975
- Airport '77
- Concorde Affaire '79
- SST: Death Flight, a 1977 made-for-TV movie also directed by David Lowell Rich

== Bibliography ==
- Kristel, Sylvia (2007). Undressing Emmanuelle : a memoir. Fourth Estate.
