= Airport (1970 film) =

1970 film by George Seaton

- Theatrical release poster
- Directed by: George Seaton (Note: An uncredited Henry Hathaway directed many exteriors after Seaton took ill.)
- Screenplay by: George Seaton
- Based on: Airport (1968 novel) by Arthur Hailey
- Produced by: Ross Hunter
- Starring: Burt Lancaster; Dean Martin; Jean Seberg; Jacqueline Bisset; George Kennedy; Helen Hayes; Van Heflin; Maureen Stapleton; Barry Nelson; Lloyd Nolan; Dana Wynter; Barbara Hale
- Cinematography: Ernest Laszlo
- Edited by: Stuart Gilmore
- Music by: Alfred Newman
- Production company: Ross Hunter Productions
- Distributed by: Universal Pictures
- Release date: March 5, 1970 (New York)
- Running time: 137 minutes
- Country: United States
- Language: English
- Budget: $10.2 million
- Box office: $128 million

Airport is a 1970 American disaster film written and directed by George Seaton, and distributed by Universal Pictures. Based on Arthur Hailey's 1968 novel, it originated the 1970s disaster film genre, and is the first of four films in the Airport film series. It features an ensemble cast of performers, led by Burt Lancaster and Dean Martin, and featuring Jean Seberg, Jacqueline Bisset, George Kennedy, Helen Hayes, Van Heflin, Maureen Stapleton, Barry Nelson, Lloyd Nolan, Dana Wynter and Barbara Hale.

The film is about airport manager Mel Bakersfeld (Lancaster) trying to keep his airport open during a snowstorm, while suicide bomber D.O. Guerrero plots to blow up a Boeing 707 airliner in flight. It takes place at fictional Lincoln International Airport near Chicago (based on O'Hare International Airport). Ernest Laszlo photographed it in 70 mm Todd-AO. It is the last film scored by Alfred Newman and the last film roles of Van Heflin and Jessie Royce Landis. It was also Ross Hunter's last film produced for Universal after a 17-year tenure.

With attention paid to the detail of day-to-day airport and airline operations, the plot concerns the response to a paralyzing snowstorm, environmental concerns over noise pollution, and an attempt to blow up an airliner. The film is characterized by personal stories intertwining while decisions are made minute-by-minute by the airport and airline staffs, operations and maintenance crews, flight crews, and Federal Aviation Administration air traffic controllers.

Produced on a $10 million budget, it earned over $128 million. The film was a commercial success and surpassed Spartacus as Universal Pictures' highest-grossing film at the time. The film won Hayes an Academy Award for Best Supporting Actress for her role as elderly stowaway Ada Quonsett and was nominated for nine other Oscars, including Best Picture and Best Adapted Screenplay.

== Plot ==
During a severe January snowstorm at Chicago's Lincoln International Airport, Trans Global Airlines (TGA) Flight 45's crew misjudge their turn from Runway 29 onto the taxiway. The Boeing 707 gets stuck in the snow, and its tail fouls the runway, causing it to be closed due to safety concerns. Airport manager Mel Bakersfeld is forced to work overtime, causing tension with his estranged wife Cindy. A divorce seems imminent as he nurtures a closer relationship with TGA customer relations agent Tanya Livingston.

TGA pilot Vernon Demerest is scheduled to evaluate Captain Anson Harris during TGA Flight 2 to Rome, aboard the airline's flagship international flight titled The Golden Argosy. Despite being married to Bakersfeld's sister Sarah, Demerest is having an affair with chief stewardess Gwen Meighen who informs him before takeoff that she is pregnant with his child. They consider abortion, but Gwen has moral qualms about such a procedure and expresses the excitement she felt upon being told of her pregnancy.

Bakersfeld calls in TWA senior mechanic Joe Patroni to assist with removing the disabled plane. He and Tanya also deal with Ada Quonsett, an elderly widow from San Diego who is a habitual stowaway on various airlines. Bakersfeld also clashes with commissioner Ackerman, who wishes to close the alternate runway 22 (and thus the entire airport) due to noise complaints from nearby residents.

Former U.S. Army Corps of Engineers demolition expert Dominic "D.O." Guerrero, who has a history of mental illness, buys both a ticket aboard Flight 2 and a large life insurance policy, intending to commit suicide. He plans to detonate a bomb in a briefcase as the plane flies over the Atlantic Ocean so that his wife Inez, a waitress, will collect a $225,000 insurance policy payout. His erratic behavior at the airport, including mistaking a customs officer for a gate agent, attracts officials' attention. Inez finds a special delivery envelope from a travel agency, and upon realizing her husband might be doing something desperate, she rushes to the airport to try to dissuade him, but she arrives shortly after Flight 2 departs. She informs officials that he had been fired from a construction job for "misplacing" explosives and that the family's financial situation is dire.

Mrs. Quonsett manages to evade Peter Coakley, the TGA gate agent assigned to escort her to her flight back home to San Diego. Enchanted by the idea of a trip to Rome, she talks her way past the gate agent, boards Flight 2 and sits next to Guerrero. When the flight crew is made aware of Guerrero's situation, they turn the plane back toward Chicago without informing the passengers. Once Quonsett is discovered onboard, her help is enlisted by the flight crew who promise her free lifetime first-class travel on TGA to get to the briefcase, but the ploy fails due to meddlesome passenger Marcus Rathbone, who thinks that the crew is stealing the suitcase and thus gives it back to Guerrero.

Demerest tries to persuade Guerrero not to trigger the bomb, informing him that his insurance policy has been nullified. Guerrero moves to give Demerest the bomb, but panics and runs into the lavatory after Rathbone loudly mentions the bomb and shortly detonates it, killing himself and subsequently blowing a three-foot hole in the rear fuselage. Gwen and some other passengers are seriously injured in the explosion and subsequent explosive decompression, but the pilots retain control of the 707. However, flight control is severely hindered due to the blast damage.

With all eastern airports closed due to bad weather, Flight 2 returns to Lincoln for an emergency landing. Demerest knows that a fatal crash landing would happen if they attempt to land on the shorter Runway 22, and thus demands the airport's longest runway, Runway 29, which is still closed due to the disabled airliner. Bakersfeld orders that plane be sacrificed and forcibly pushed off by snowplows. However, Patroni goes ahead and manages to move it without damage by defying the specified engine and structural limit requirements, allowing Runway 29 to be reopened just in time for the crippled Flight 2 to land. His assistant declares that the feat was impossible according to the flight manual, to which Patroni replies "That's one nice thing about the 707. It can do everything but read."

As the passengers deplane, a tearful Inez apologizes for her now late husband's actions. Demerest's wife Sarah sees him accompanying Gwen's stretcher as he intends to go with Gwen to the hospital. Demerest has now decided he wants her to go through with her pregnancy. Mrs. Quonsett enjoys her lifetime reward of free first-class travel on TGA, but says she preferred being a stowaway. Bakersfeld and Tanya leave together, heading to her apartment for "rest" and breakfast.

== Cast ==
- Burt Lancaster as Mel Bakersfeld, airport manager at Lincoln International Airport near Chicago
- Dean Martin as Vernon Demerest, checkride captain on Trans Global Airlines (TGA) Flight 2, Bakersfeld's brother-in-law
- Jean Seberg as Tanya Livingston, widowed head customer relations agent for TGA and Bakersfeld's potential love interest
- Jacqueline Bisset as Gwen Meighen, chief stewardess on TGA Flight 2 and Demerest's lover who's pregnant with his child
- George Kennedy as Joe Patroni, chief mechanic for TWA requested by Bakersfeld to help move the disabled airplane from Runway 29 since he is taxi-licensed
- Helen Hayes as Ada Quonsett, an elderly stowaway from San Diego
- Van Heflin as Dominic "D.O." Guerrero, a disturbed, unemployed contractor and demolitions expert aboard TGA Flight 2 (This was Heflin's final theatrical film role)
- Maureen Stapleton as Inez Guerrero, D.O. Guerrero's wife who works as a waitress at a local diner
- Barry Nelson as Anson Harris, captain on TGA Flight 2
- Dana Wynter as Cindy Bakersfeld, Bakersfeld's estranged wife
- Lloyd Nolan as Harry Standish, head of the U.S. Customs Service at the airport
- Barbara Hale as Sarah Bakersfeld Demerest, Bakersfeld's sister and Demerest's wife
- Gary Collins as Cy Jordan, flight engineer on TGA Flight 2
- John Findlater as Peter Coakley, a TGA gate agent assigned to escort Mrs. Quonsett to her flight home
- Jessie Royce Landis as Harriet DuBarry Mossman, an arriving passenger caught trying to smuggle diamonds through customs (Landis' final theatrical film role)
- Larry Gates as Ackerman, head of the airport's board of commissioners
- Peter Turgeon as Marcus Rathbone, a caustic and meddlesome passenger aboard TGA Flight 2 who ruins the Guerrero bomb diversion attempt
- Whit Bissell as Mr. Davidson, a passenger seated beside Mrs. Quonsett
- Paul Picerni as Dr. Compagno, a passenger who administers first aid to victims following the onboard explosion

== Production ==
Most of the filming was at Minneapolis–Saint Paul International Airport, which was redressed as the fictional Lincoln International Airport. A display in the terminal, with stills from the field and the film, says: "Minnesota's legendary winters attracted Hollywood here in 1969, when portions of the film Airport were shot in the terminal and on the field. The weather remained stubbornly clear, however, forcing the director to use plastic 'snow' to create the appropriate effect."

George Seaton caught pneumonia Christmas Day in 1968 and Henry Hathaway took over directing while Seaton recovered, directing most of the exteriors; despite shooting for five weeks, Hathaway elected for no payment or screen credit.

The expensive set built representing the full interior of the 707 was left standing at Universal Studios, and was eventually joined with a more expensive airliner set, the front half of a 747-interior constructed in 1974 for Airport 1975. These two sets became known as "Stage 747" on the lot, and both sets were used extensively in other Universal films and television series. The 707 set was used, for instance, in The Andromeda Strain and on series like Ironside. The sets were amortized over these many productions, and later removed around 2002 and the space converted into a workshop.

Only one Boeing 707 was used: a model 707-349C (registration N324F) leased from Flying Tiger Line. It sported an El Al cheatline over its bare metal finish, with the fictional Trans Global Airlines (TGA) titles and tail. This aircraft later crashed on March 21, 1989, during approach into São Paulo while in service as cargo flight Transbrasil Flight 801, killing all three crew members and 22 people on the ground.

=== Score ===
The film was the final project for composer Alfred Newman. His health was failing and he was unable to conduct the sessions for his music's recording. The job was handled by Stanley Wilson, although the covers of the Decca "original soundtrack album" and the 1993 Varèse Sarabande CD issue credit Newman. Newman did conduct the music heard in the film. He died before the film's release. Newman received his 45th Academy Award nomination for Best Original Score posthumously for this film, the most received by a composer at that time.

== Release ==
Airport was released on March 5, 1970, at New York's Radio City Music Hall.

=== Television ===
The film was first broadcast on Canada's CTV on October 24, 1973, nearly a month before ABC on November 11. The ABC broadcast became the joint highest-rated film on television, matching Love Story, with a Nielsen rating of 42.3 but with a slightly higher audience share of 63% (compared to Love Story's 62%). The record was beaten in 1976 by Gone with the Wind.

== Reception ==
=== Box office ===
The film grossed $235,000 in its opening week at Radio City Music Hall, placing seventh at the US box office. It expanded to more cities in its third week of release and went to number one at the US box office where it stayed for a second week. It returned to number one in its eighth week of release where it again spent two weeks at the top; a feat repeated three weeks later After 12 weeks of release, it had grossed $9.5 million, including $2.6 million at Radio City Music Hall. It returned again to the top spot in its 17th and 19th week of release for a total of eight weeks at number one.

By the end of the year, it was the highest-grossing film of the year with theatrical rentals of $37.7 million in the United States and Canada and the seventh highest-grossing film in the United States and Canada of all time. Universal claimed that it was the highest-grossing film without a roadshow release of all time.

It went on to gross $100,489,151 in the United States and Canada, which, adjusted for inflation, is equivalent to $833 million in 2025. Internationally, it grossed $28 million for a worldwide gross of $128 million.

=== Critical response ===
Variety wrote: "Based on the novel by Arthur Hailey, over-produced by Ross Hunter with a cast of stars as long as a jet runway, and adapted and directed by George Seaton in a glossy, slick style, Airport is a handsome, often dramatically involving $10 million epitaph to a bygone brand of filmmaking" but added that the film "does not create suspense because the audience knows how it's going to end." Boxoffice praised the film's strong production values, excellent cast, and potential to be very popular but foresaw that other critics' opinions would not be universally favourable.

Film critic Pauline Kael gave Airport one of its worst contemporary reviews, scornfully dismissing it as "bland entertainment of the old school." "There's no electricity in it", she wrote; "every stereotyped action is followed by a stereotyped reaction." Roger Ebert gave the film two stars out of four and faulted a predictable plot and characters that "talk in regulation B-movie clichés like no B-movie you've seen in ten years." Gene Siskel gave the film two-and-a-half stars out of four and reported that while the theater audience cheered at the climax, "it's a long and torturous road to the applause. Blocking the path are speeches that promote the industry, dialog that ranks among the silliest in memory, and a labored plot that tells you everything twice."

Vincent Canby of The New York Times called it "an immensely silly film—and it will probably entertain people who no longer care very much about movies." Charles Champlin of the Los Angeles Times called the film "breath-taking in its celebration of anything which used to work when Hollywood was younger and we were all more innocent." Gary Arnold of The Washington Post called it "a lousy movie" that was "utterly predictable." The Monthly Film Bulletin wrote, "Corny is really the only word for this unbelievably old-fashioned look at the modern phenomenon of an international airport: the one surprise is that the sweet old white-haired stowaway doesn't spring to the controls and bring the distressed aircraft down single-handed as Doris Day did once upon a time in analogous circumstances."

Christopher Null wrote in 2000, "With one grandiose entrance, Airport ushered in a genre of moviemaking that is still going strong—the disaster movie... Too bad the 'disaster' doesn't happen until 2 hours into the 2:15 movie. No matter—Airport's unending sequels and spoofs are a testament that this film is a true piece of Americana, for good or for bad." Despite the film being one of the most profitable of Burt Lancaster's career, he called it "a piece of junk."

Review aggregator Rotten Tomatoes gives the film a rating of 72%, based on 18 reviews. On Metacritic, the film holds an average rating of 42/100, based on 5 critics, indicating "mixed or average reviews".

=== Awards and nominations ===
Award	Category	Nominee(s)	Result	Ref.
Academy Awards	Best Picture	Ross Hunter	Nominated	
Academy Awards	Best Supporting Actress	Helen Hayes	Won	
Academy Awards	Best Supporting Actress	Maureen Stapleton	Nominated	
Academy Awards	Best Screenplay – Based on Material from Another Medium	George Seaton	Nominated	
Academy Awards	Best Art Direction	Art Direction: Alexander Golitzen, E. Preston Ames; Set Decoration: Jack D. Moore, Mickey S. Michaels	Nominated	
Academy Awards	Best Cinematography	Ernest Laszlo	Nominated	
Academy Awards	Best Costume Design	Edith Head	Nominated	
Academy Awards	Best Film Editing	Stuart Gilmore	Nominated	
Academy Awards	Best Original Score	Alfred Newman (Note: Posthumous nomination.)	Nominated	
Academy Awards	Best Sound	Ronald Pierce, David H. Moriarty	Nominated	
American Cinema Editors Awards	Best Edited Feature Film	Stuart Gilmore	Nominated	
British Academy Film Awards	Best Actress in a Supporting Role	Maureen Stapleton	Nominated	
Golden Globe Awards	Best Motion Picture – Drama		Nominated	
Golden Globe Awards	Best Supporting Actor – Motion Picture	George Kennedy	Nominated	
Golden Globe Awards	Best Supporting Actress – Motion Picture	Maureen Stapleton	Won (Note: Tied with Karen Black for Five Easy Pieces.)	
Golden Globe Awards	Best Original Score – Motion Picture	Alfred Newman	Nominated	
Golden Reel Awards	Best Sound Editing – Dialogue		Won	
Grammy Awards	Best Instrumental Composition	"Airport Love Theme" – Alfred Newman	Won	
Grammy Awards	Best Original Score Written for a Motion Picture or a Television Special	Alfred Newman	Nominated	
Laurel Awards	Best Picture		5th place	
Laurel Awards	Top Male Supporting Performance	George Kennedy	Nominated	
Laurel Awards	Top Female Supporting Performance	Helen Hayes	Won	
Laurel Awards	Top Composer	Alfred Newman	Nominated	
Writers Guild of America Awards	Best Drama – Adapted from Another Medium	George Seaton	Nominated	

== Soundtrack ==
- From the soundtrack, the instrumental, "Airport Love Theme" by Vincent Bell peaked at number thirty-one on the Billboard Hot 100 chart and number two for three weeks on the Billboard Adult Contemporary chart.

=== Track listing ===
1. "Airport (Main Title)" (3:11)
2. "Airport Love Theme" (3:30)
3. "Inez' Theme" (1:29)
4. "Guerrero's Goodbye" (2:37)
5. "Ada Quonsett, Stowaway" (1:26)
6. "Mel And Tanya" (2:27)
7. "Airport Love Theme #2" (2:40)
8. "Joe Patroni Plane Or Plows?" (2:22)
9. "Triangle!" (3:50)
10. "Inez-Lost Forever" (1:45)
11. "Emergency Landing!" (1:38)
12. "Airport (End Title)" (2:36)

=== Personnel ===
- Bud Shank – reeds
- Carol Kaye – electric bass
- Bill Plummer – double bass
- Dennis Budimir, Howard Roberts, Joe Cinderella, Tommy Tedesco – guitar

== Sequels ==
Airport had three sequels, the first two of which were hits.

- Airport 1975
- Airport '77
- The Concorde ... Airport '79 (titled Airport '80: The Concorde in the United Kingdom & Japan)

The only actor to appear in all four films is George Kennedy as Joe Patroni. Patroni's character evolves and he goes from a chief mechanic in Airport to a vice president of operations in Airport 1975, a consultant in Airport '77, and an experienced pilot in The Concorde ... Airport '79.

== See also ==
- The High and the Mighty, a 1954 film which served as the template for Airport
- Zero Hour!, a 1957 film written by Arthur Hailey that visited the airline disaster film genre a decade before Hailey published Airport
- Jet Storm, a 1959 British film with many similarities
- Airplane! (1980), a successful parody film that blended elements of an already well-established airline disaster film genre, including plot points inspired by Airport '75 as well as Zero Hour!
- Starflight: The Plane That Couldn't Land, a 1983 ABC television movie, starring Lee Majors. Also known as Starflight One or Airport 85.
