= George Kennedy =

American actor (1925–2016)

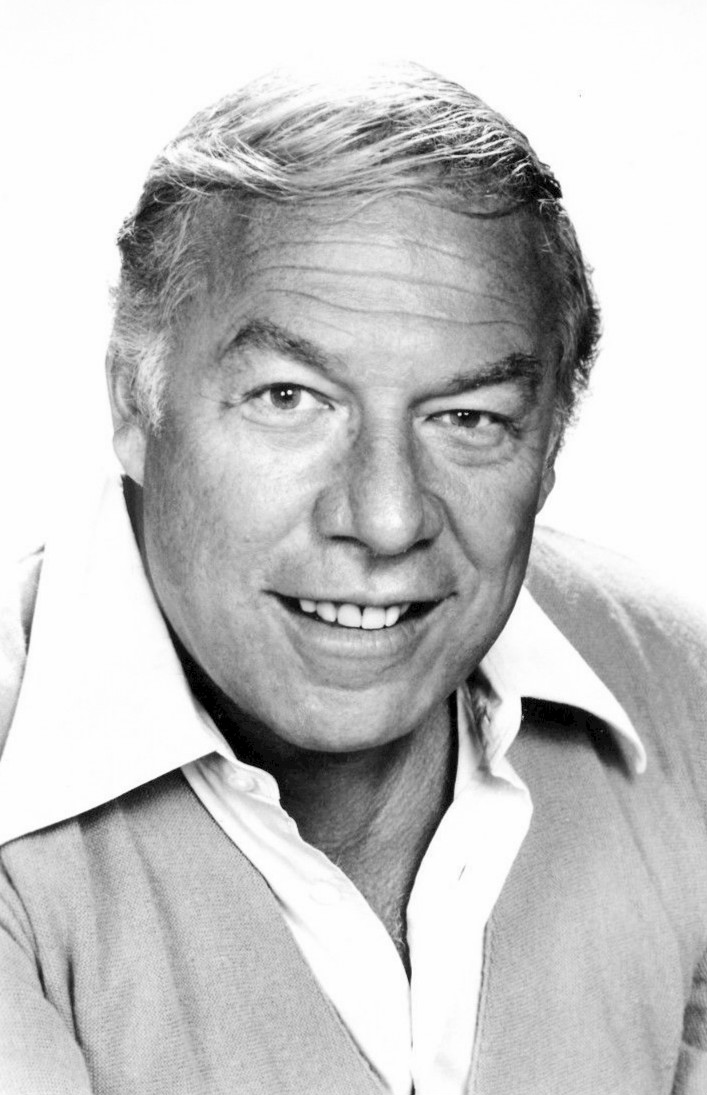
- Publicity photo of Kennedy (1975)
- Born: George Harris Kennedy Jr. February 18, 1925; New York City, U.S.
- Died: February 28, 2016 (aged 91); Middleton, Idaho, U.S.
- Occupation: Actor
- Years active: 1956–2014
- Spouses: Dorothy Gillooly (m. 1946; div. 1959) Norma Wurman (m. 1959; div. 1971) (m. 1973; div. 1978) Joan McCarthy (m. 1978; died 2015)
- Children: 6
- Military career
- Allegiance: United States
- Branch: United States Army
- Service years: 1943–1959
- Rank: Captain
- Conflicts: World War II; Western Front

George Harris Kennedy Jr. (February 18, 1925 – February 28, 2016) was an American actor who appeared in more than 100 film and television productions. He played "Dragline" in Cool Hand Luke (1967), winning the Academy Award for Best Supporting Actor for the role and being nominated for the corresponding Golden Globe. He received a second Golden Globe nomination for portraying Joe Patroni in Airport (1970).

Among other films in which he had a significant role are Lonely Are the Brave; Charade; Strait-Jacket, McHale's Navy; Hush… Hush, Sweet Charlotte; Mirage; Shenandoah; The Sons of Katie Elder; The Flight of the Phoenix; In Harm's Way; The Dirty Dozen; The Boston Strangler; Guns of the Magnificent Seven; tick… tick… tick…; Cahill U.S. Marshal; Thunderbolt and Lightfoot; The Good Guys and the Bad Guys; Earthquake; The Eiger Sanction and The Delta Force.

Kennedy is the only actor to appear in all four films in the Airport series, reprising the role of Joe Patroni each time. He also portrays Police Captain Ed Hocken in the Naked Gun series of films, and corrupt oil tycoon Carter McKay on the original Dallas television series.

== Early life, education and military service ==
Kennedy was born on February 18, 1925, in New York City, into a show business family. His father, George Harris Kennedy, a musician and orchestra leader, died when Kennedy was four years old. He was raised by his mother, Helen A. (née Kieselbach), a ballet dancer. His maternal grandfather was a German immigrant; his other ancestry was Irish and English.

Kennedy made his stage debut at age 2 in a touring company of Bringing Up Father, and by age 7, he was a New York City radio DJ.

Kennedy graduated in 1943 from Chaminade High School in Mineola, Long Island, New York.

Kennedy enlisted in the United States Army during World War II in 1943. He served 16 years, reaching the rank of captain. Kennedy served in the infantry under George S. Patton, fought in the Battle of the Bulge, and earned two Bronze Stars. He re-enlisted after the war, and he was discharged in the late 1950s due to a back injury.

== Acting career ==
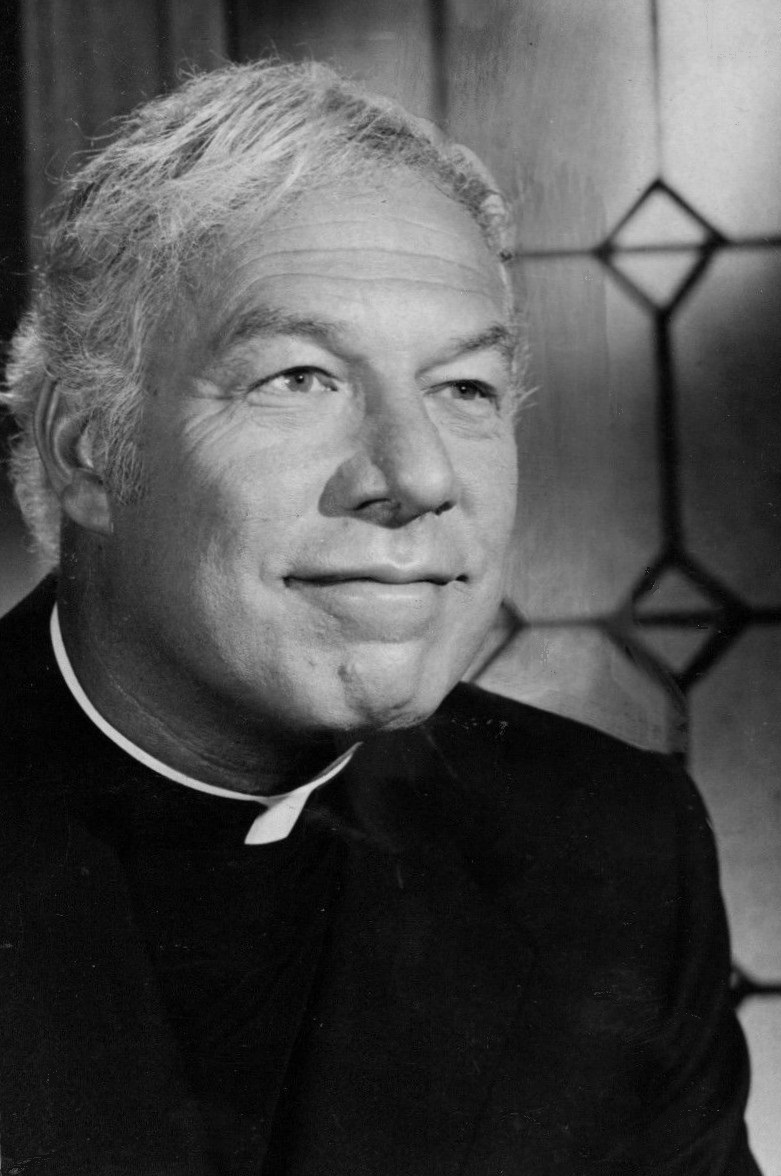
In Sarge, 1971

Kennedy's first screen role came by way of his final Army assignment: as military advisor on the TV sitcom The Phil Silvers Show. When an acting spot as a military policeman opened up, he got the part, calling the experience a "great training ground for me".

His film career began in 1961 in The Little Shepherd of Kingdom Come. He appeared in several Hollywood movies, including as a sadistic jail guard in the Kirk Douglas modern Western Lonely Are the Brave (1962), a ruthless criminal in the Cary Grant suspense film Charade (1963) and in the Joan Crawford thriller Strait-Jacket (1964).

Kennedy was busy in 1965. He appeared with Gregory Peck in the mystery Mirage, with a large cast led by James Stewart in the plane-crash adventure The Flight of the Phoenix, with John Wayne in the war film In Harm's Way, and with Wayne and Dean Martin in the Western The Sons of Katie Elder.

He played the character Blodgett in a 1966 episode "Return to Lawrence" of the series The Legend of Jesse James. He won an Academy Award for Best Supporting Actor in Cool Hand Luke (1967) for his performance as Dragline, a chain-gang convict who at first resents the new prisoner in camp played by Paul Newman, then comes to idolize the rebellious Luke.

Kennedy followed with films such as The Dirty Dozen, Bandolero! and The Boston Strangler. In 1970, he appeared in the disaster film Airport, in which he plays one of its main characters, airline troubleshooter Joe Patroni. He reprised the role in Airport 1975, Airport '77 and The Concorde... Airport '79, the only cast member to appear in each film of the series.

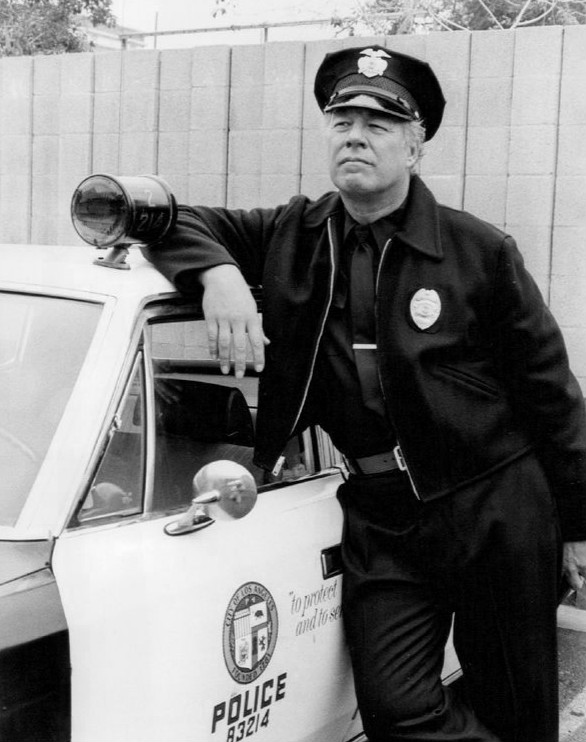
As Bumper Morgan in The Blue Knight, 1976

The Airport franchise helped inspire the Zucker, Abrahams, and Zucker satire Airplane!, in which the filmmakers hoped to cast Kennedy as the bumbling plane dispatcher. The role went to Lloyd Bridges because Kennedy "couldn't kill off his Airport cash-cow", Jerry Zucker said in 2010.

Kennedy co-starred with Clint Eastwood in Thunderbolt and Lightfoot and The Eiger Sanction, and with ensemble casts in the disaster film Earthquake and the Agatha Christie mystery Death on the Nile.

He also starred in two television series: Sarge, which aired from 1971 to 1972 and The Blue Knight from 1975 to 1976.

Kennedy starred in two Japanese productions, Junya Satō's Proof of the Man in 1977 and Kinji Fukasaku's Virus in 1980. Both films were produced by Haruki Kadokawa and featured extensive international casts and shooting locations. Although Proof of the Man was only released theatrically in Japan and Virus saw a financially unsuccessful truncated cut in the U.S., Kennedy was highly enthusiastic about his involvement.

In 1984, Kennedy starred with Bo Derek in the box-office bomb Bolero. His other films during the 1980s included Savage Dawn, The Delta Force and Creepshow 2. He played Captain Ed Hocken in all three entries of The Naked Gun film trilogy (1988, 1991, 1994) alongside Leslie Nielsen, Priscilla Presley and O. J. Simpson.

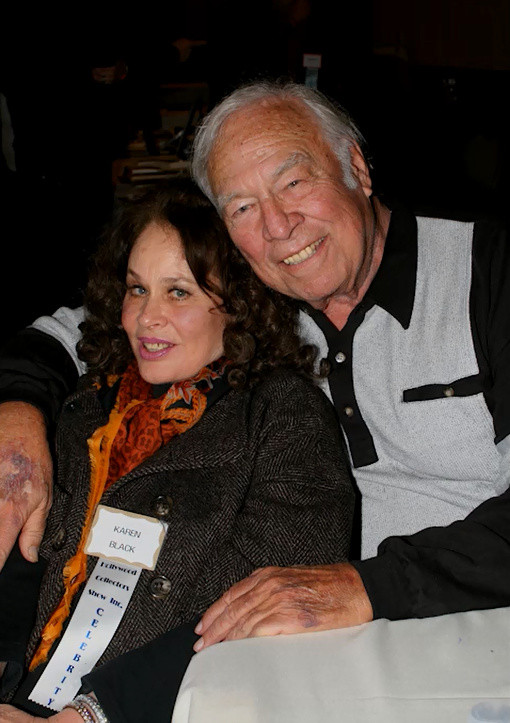
With Karen Black, 2008

In 1990, Kennedy appeared in the Korean film Mayumi directed by Shin Sang-ok. Despite featuring Kennedy, it saw no wide release outside of South Korea and was ultimately a box-office failure.

On television, Kennedy starred as Carter McKay in the TV series Dallas (1978–1991), appearing from 1988 to 1991. From the mid-to-late 1990s, he promoted "BreathAsure" antacid tablets in radio and television commercials. Around this time, he reprised his role as McKay in the television films Dallas: J.R. Returns and Dallas: War of the Ewings. In the late 1970s, Kennedy also appeared as a celebrity guest on the game show Match Game.

In 1998, he voiced Brick Bazooka for the film Small Soldiers. He then made several independent films, before making a 2003 comeback to television in The Young and the Restless, playing the character Albert Miller, the biological father to character Victor Newman. In 2005, he made a cameo in the film Don't Come Knocking, playing the director of an ill-fated western.

Kennedy made his final film appearance in The Gambler (2014) as Ed, the dying grandfather of Mark Wahlberg's Jim Bennett. His role lasts for less than two minutes during the film's opening scene, wherein Ed (moments before his death) bequeaths the responsibilities of patriarch to a heartbroken Jim.

== Personal life ==
=== Marriages and children ===
Kennedy was married four times, to three women. In the 1940s, he married Dorothy Gillooly, who had served in the Women's Army Corps. They were divorced in the 1950s; Dorothy returned to her hometown, Buffalo, New York. In 1959, Kennedy married Norma Wurman, also known as Revel Wurman. The couple had two children. Kennedy and Norma divorced the first time in 1971, remarried in 1973, and divorced a second and final time in 1978. The same year, Kennedy married Joan McCarthy (née Castagna). They remained married until her death in September 2015. The couple adopted three children.

=== Interests ===
Kennedy was friends with James Stewart, and he provided the voiceover in a mini-tribute to Stewart on TCM. Kennedy was an aviator who enjoyed flying and owned a Cessna 210 and Beechcraft Bonanza. Following his experiences working for the Far East Network in the 1950s while still in the Army and professional involvement with Proof of the Man and Virus, Kennedy maintained a lifelong affinity for Japan and its culture.

=== Illness and death ===
Kennedy resided in Eagle, Idaho, at the time of his death. He died on the morning of February 28, 2016, of a heart ailment at an assisted-living facility in Middleton, Idaho, 10 days after his 91st birthday. He had a history of heart disease.

== Filmography ==
=== Film ===
Year	Title	Role	Notes
1961	The Little Shepherd of Kingdom Come	Nathan Dillon	directed by Andrew V. McLaglen
1962	Lonely Are the Brave	Deputy Sheriff Gutierrez	directed by David Miller
1962	The Silent Witness	Gus Jordan	
1963	The Man from the Diners' Club	George	directed by Frank Tashlin
1963	Charade	Herman Scobie	directed by Stanley Donen
1964	Strait-Jacket	Leo Krause	directed and co-produced by William Castle
1964	McHale's Navy	Henri Le Clerc	based on the 1962–1966 sitcom of the same name and directed by Edward Montagne
1964	Island of the Blue Dolphins	Aleut Captain	directed by James B. Clark
1964	Hush... Hush, Sweet Charlotte	Foreman	directed and produced by Robert Aldrich
1965	In Harm's Way	Colonel Gregory	produced and directed by Otto Preminger
1965	Mirage	Willard	directed by Edward Dmytryk and based on the novel Fallen Angel written by Howard Fast under the pseudonym Walter Ericson
1965	Shenandoah	Colonel Fairchild	directed by Andrew V. McLaglen
1965	The Sons of Katie Elder	Curley	directed by Henry Hathaway
1965	The Flight of the Phoenix	Mike Bellamy	produced and directed by Robert Aldrich and based on the 1964 novel The Flight of the Phoenix by Elleston Trevor
1967	Hurry Sundown	Sheriff Coombs	produced and directed by Otto Preminger
1967	The Dirty Dozen	Major Max Armbruster	directed by Robert Aldrich
1967	Cool Hand Luke	Dragline	directed by Stuart Rosenberg
1967	The Ballad of Josie	Arch Ogden	directed by Andrew V. McLaglen
1968	Bandolero!	Sheriff July Johnson	directed by Andrew V. McLaglen
1968	The Pink Jungle	Sammy Ryderbeit	directed by Delbert Mann
1968	The Legend of Lylah Clare	Matt Burke	uncredited
1968	The Boston Strangler	Det. Phil DiNatale	based on the true story of the Boston Strangler and the book by Gerold Frank; directed by Richard Fleischer
1969	Guns of the Magnificent Seven	Chris Adams	directed by Paul Wendkos
1969	The Good Guys and the Bad Guys	Big John McKay	directed by Burt Kennedy
1969	Gaily, Gaily	Axel P. Johanson	directed by Norman Jewison and based on the autobiographical novel by Ben Hecht
1970	...tick...tick...tick...	John Little	directed by Ralph Nelson
1970	Airport	Joe Patroni	directed by George Seaton and based on Arthur Hailey's 1968 novel of the same name
1970	Zig Zag	Paul R. Cameron	directed by Richard A. Colla
1970	Dirty Dingus Magee	Herkimer "Hoke" Birdsill	directed and produced by Burt Kennedy
1971	Fools' Parade	Dallas "Doc" Council	directed by Andrew McLaglen
1973	Lost Horizon	Sam Cornelius	directed by Charles Jarrott
1973	Cahill U.S. Marshal	Abe Fraser	directed by Andrew V. McLaglen
1974	Thunderbolt and Lightfoot	Red Leary	written and directed by Michael Cimino
1974	Airport 1975	Joe Patroni	directed by Jack Smight
1974	Earthquake	Sergeant Lew Slade	directed and produced by Mark Robson
1975	The Eiger Sanction	Ben Bowman	based on the novel of the same name by Trevanian (Note: Trevanian is a pseudonym used by the American author Dr. Rodney William Whitaker.) and directed by and starring Clint Eastwood
1975	The "Human" Factor	John Kinsdale	directed by Edward Dmytryk
1977	Airport '77	Joe Patroni	directed by Jerry Jameson
1977	Proof of the Man	Ken Shuftan	directed by Junya Satō
1978	Mean Dog Blues	Captain Omar Kinsman	directed by Mel Stuart
1978	Death on the Nile	Andrew Pennington	based on the novel of the same name, directed by John Guillermin, and adapted by Anthony Shaffer
1978	Brass Target	General George S. Patton	based on the novel The Algonquin Project by Frederick Nolan and directed by John Hough
1979	Search and Destroy	Anthony Fusqua	directed by William Fruet
1979	The Double McGuffin	Chief Talasek	directed by Joe Camp
1979	Steel	Big Lew Cassidy	directed by Steve Carver
1979	The Concorde... Airport '79	Captain Joe Patroni	directed by David Lowell Rich
1980	Death Ship	Captain Ashland	directed by Alvin Rakoff
1980	Virus	Admiral Conway	directed by Kinji Fukasaku and based on a 1964 novel written by Sakyo Komatsu.
1980	Hotwire	Farley & Harley Fontenot	
1981	Just Before Dawn	Roy McLean	directed by Jeff Lieberman
1981	Modern Romance	Himself; Zoron	directed by Albert Brooks
1981	The Archer: Fugitive from the Empire	Brakus	written, directed and produced by Nicholas J. Corea
1982	Wacko	Mr. Doctor Graves	directed by Greydon Clark
1982	The Jupiter Menace	Himself	documentary
1984	Chattanooga Choo Choo	Bert	directed by Bruce Bilson
1984	A Rare Breed	Nathan Hill	
1984	Bolero	Cotton	written and directed by John Derek
1984	Rigged	Ben	
1985	Radioactive Dreams	Spade Chandler	directed by Albert Pyun
1985	Savage Dawn	Tick Rand	directed by Simon Nuchtern
1986	The Delta Force	Father O'Malley	directed by Menahem Golan
1987	Creepshow 2	Ray Spruce	directed by Michael Gornick
1987	The Gunfighters	Deke Turner	directed by Clay Borris
1987	Uninvited	Mike Harvey	
1988	Born to Race	Vincent Duplain	
1988	Counterforce	Vince Colby	
1988	Demonwarp	Bill Crafton	
1988	Nightmare at Noon	Sheriff Hanks	
1988	Alien Terminator	Heinrich Holzmann	
1988	The Naked Gun: From the Files of Police Squad!	Captain Ed Hocken	start of the Naked Gun franchise
1989	The Terror Within	Hal	
1989	Ministry of Vengeance	Rev. Hughes	
1989	Esmeralda Bay	Wilson	directed by Jesús Franco
1990	Brain Dead	Vance	
1990	Hired to Kill	Thomas	
1990	Mayumi	Bahraini investigator	directed by Shin Sang-ok
1991	Hangfire	Warden E. Barles	
1991	Driving Me Crazy	John McCready	
1991	The Naked Gun 2½: The Smell of Fear	Captain Ed Hocken	
1991	Intensive Care	Dr. Bruckner	
1992	Final Shot: The Hank Gathers Story	Father Dave	
1992	Distant Justice	Tom Bradfield	
1994	Naked Gun 33 1/3: The Final Insult	Captain Ed Hocken	
1994	River of Stone		
1997	Cats Don't Dance	L.B. Mammoth	voice
1997	Bayou Ghost	Officer Lowe	
1998	Small Soldiers	Brick Bazooka	voice
1998	Dennis the Menace Strikes Again	Grandpa Johnson	Direct-to-video
2003	View from the Top	Passenger Requesting Vodka	uncredited
2005	Three Bad Men	Ed Fiske	
2005	Truce	Dr. Peter Gannon	
2005	Don't Come Knocking	director	
2008	The Man Who Came Back	Judge Duke	
2010	Six Days in Paradise	Monty Crenshaw	
2010	Mad Mad Wagon Party	JB Scotch	
2011	Another Happy Day	Joe Baker	
2014	The Gambler	Ed	

=== Television ===
Year	Title	Role	Notes
1956–1959	The Phil Silvers Show	MP Sergeant Kennedy	14 episodes
1959	Cheyenne	Lee Nelson	Episode: "Prisoner of Moon Mesa"
1959	Colt .45	Hank	Episode: "The Rival Gun"
1959	The Deputy	Tex	Episode: "The Big Four"
1959	Sugarfoot	Sykes	Episode: "The Canary Kid, Inc."
1960	Gunsmoke	Emil	Episode: "The Blacksmith"
1960	Route 66	Thad Skinner	Pilot Episode: "Black November"
1960	Peter Gunn	Karl	Episode: "The Crossbow"
1960	Sugarfoot	Ross Kuhn	Episode: "Funeral at Forty Mile"
1960	Shotgun Slade	Tex	Episode: "The Spanish Box"
1960	Laramie	Gallagher Henchman	Episode: "Duel at Alta Mesa"
1960	Maverick	Deputy Jones	Episode: "Hadley's Hunters"
1960	Lawman	Burt	Episode: "To Capture the West"
1960	Have Gun – Will Travel	Tarnitzer	Episode: "The Legacy"
1960	Have Gun – Will Travel	Lieutenant John Bryson	Episode: "A Head of Hair"
1961	Bat Masterson	Sheriff Zeke Armitage	Episode: "The Fourth Man"
1961	Have Gun – Will Travel	Preston	Episode: "The Road"
1961	Have Gun – Will Travel	Deke	Episode: "The Vigil"
1961	Have Gun – Will Travel	Rud Saxon	Episode: "A Proof of Life"
1961	Have Gun – Will Travel	Brother Grace	Episode: "Squatter's Rights"
1961	Gunsmoke	Pat Swooner	Episode: "Big Man"
1961	The Untouchables	Birdie	Episode: "The King of Champagne"
1961	Gunslinger	Sheriff	Episode: "The Buried People"
1961	Bonanza	Peter Long	Episode: "The Infernal Machine"
1961	Gunsmoke	Jake Bayloe	Episode: "Kitty Shot"
1962	The Tall Man	Hyram Killgore	Episode: "One for All"
1962	Rawhide	George Wales	Episode: "The Peddler"
1962	Gunsmoke	Hug	Episode: "The Boys"
1962	Have Gun – Will Travel	Big John	Episode: "Don't Shoot the Piano Player"
1962	Going My Way	Mike	Episode: "A Man for Mary"
1962	Death Valley Days	Steamboat Sully	Episode: "Miracle at Whiskey Gulch"
1962	Outlaws	Joe Ferris	Episode: "Farewell Performance"
1962	Tales of Wells Fargo	Hawk	Episode: "Assignment in Gloribee"
1963	The Andy Griffith Show	State Police Detective	Episode: "The Big House"
1963	Have Gun – Will Travel	Brother Grace	Episode: "The Eve of St. Elmo"
1963	Dr. Kildare	Joe Cramer	Episode: "To Each His Own Prison"
1963	Perry Mason	George Spangler	Episode: "The Case of the Greek Goddess"
1963	The Travels of Jaimie McPheeters	Angus	Episode: "The Day of the Long Night"
1963–1964	McHale's Navy	Big Frenchy	2 episodes
1964	Gunsmoke	Cyrus	Episode: "Crooked Mile"
1964	Bonanza	Waldo Watson	Episode: "The Scapegoat"
1964	The Virginian	Jack Marshman	Episode: "A Gallows for Sam Horn"
1964	Gunsmoke	Warden Stark	Episode: "The Warden"
1965	Daniel Boone	Zach Morgan	Episode: "A Rope for Mingo"
1965	Laredo	Jess Moran	Episode: "Pride of the Rangers"
1965	The Virginian	Tom "Bear" Suchette	Episode: "Nobility of Kings"
1965	A Man Called Shenandoah	Mitchell Canady	Episode: "A Special Talent for Killing"
1966	Gunsmoke	Ben Payson	Episode: "Harvest"
1966	The Legend of Jesse James	Blodgett	Episode: "Return to Lawrence"
1966	Dr. Kildare	Sergeant Hensley	Episodes: "Mercy or Murder", "Strange Sort of Accident"
1966	The Virginian	Huck Harkness	Episode: "The Trail to Ashley Mountain"
1966	The Big Valley	Jack Thatcher	Episode: "Barbary Red"
1967	Tarzan	Crandell	Episode: "Thief Catcher"
1971	Ironside	Father Samuel Cavanaugh	Episode: "The Priest Killer"
1971	Sarge	Father Samuel Patrick "Sarge" Cavanaugh (Swanson)	16 episodes
1972	A Great American Tragedy	Brad Wilkes	Television Film
1973	Deliver Us from Evil	Cowboy	Television Film
1974	A Cry in the Wilderness	Sam Hadley	Television Film
1975	The Blue Knight	Bumper Morgan	24 episodes
1979	Backstairs at the White House	President Warren G. Harding	Episode: #1.2
1981	Saturday Night Live	Himself/host	Episode: "George Kennedy/Miles Davis"
1983	Fantasy Island	Adam Cobb	Episode: "God Child/Curtain Call"
1984	The Jesse Owens Story	Charles 'Charley' Riley	Television film
1986	Benson	Himself	Episodes: "Reel Murder" parts 1 & 2
1988–1991	Dallas	Carter McKay	67 episodes
1994	Lonesome Dove	Judge J.T. "Rope" Calder	Episode: "Judgement Day"
1995	The Commish	Al Scali	Episode: "The Golden Years"
1995	The Gambler Part III: The Legend Continues	General Nelson Miles	Television miniseries
1996	Wings	Himself	Episode: "What About Larry?"
1996	The Real Adventures of Jonny Quest	General Axton	Episode: "DNA Doomsday"
1996	Dallas: J.R. Returns	Carter McKay	Television film
1998	Dallas: War of the Ewings	Carter McKay	Television film
2003	The Young and the Restless	Albert Miller	3 episodes
2004	The Complete History of U.S. Wars 1700–2004	Host	8 episodes
2007	Sands of Oblivion	John Tevis	Television film
2010	The Young and the Restless	Albert Miller (ghost)	Episode: #1.9553

== Awards and nominations ==
Year	Category	Award	Work	Result	Ref.
1967	Academy Awards	Best Supporting Actor	Cool Hand Luke	Won	
1967	Laurel Awards	Top Male Supporting Performance	Cool Hand Luke	Won	
1967	Golden Globe Awards	Best Supporting Actor – Motion Picture	Cool Hand Luke	Nominated	
1970	Golden Globe Awards	Best Supporting Actor – Motion Picture	Airport	Nominated	
1970	Laurel Awards	Top Male Supporting Performance	Airport	Nominated	

== Honors ==
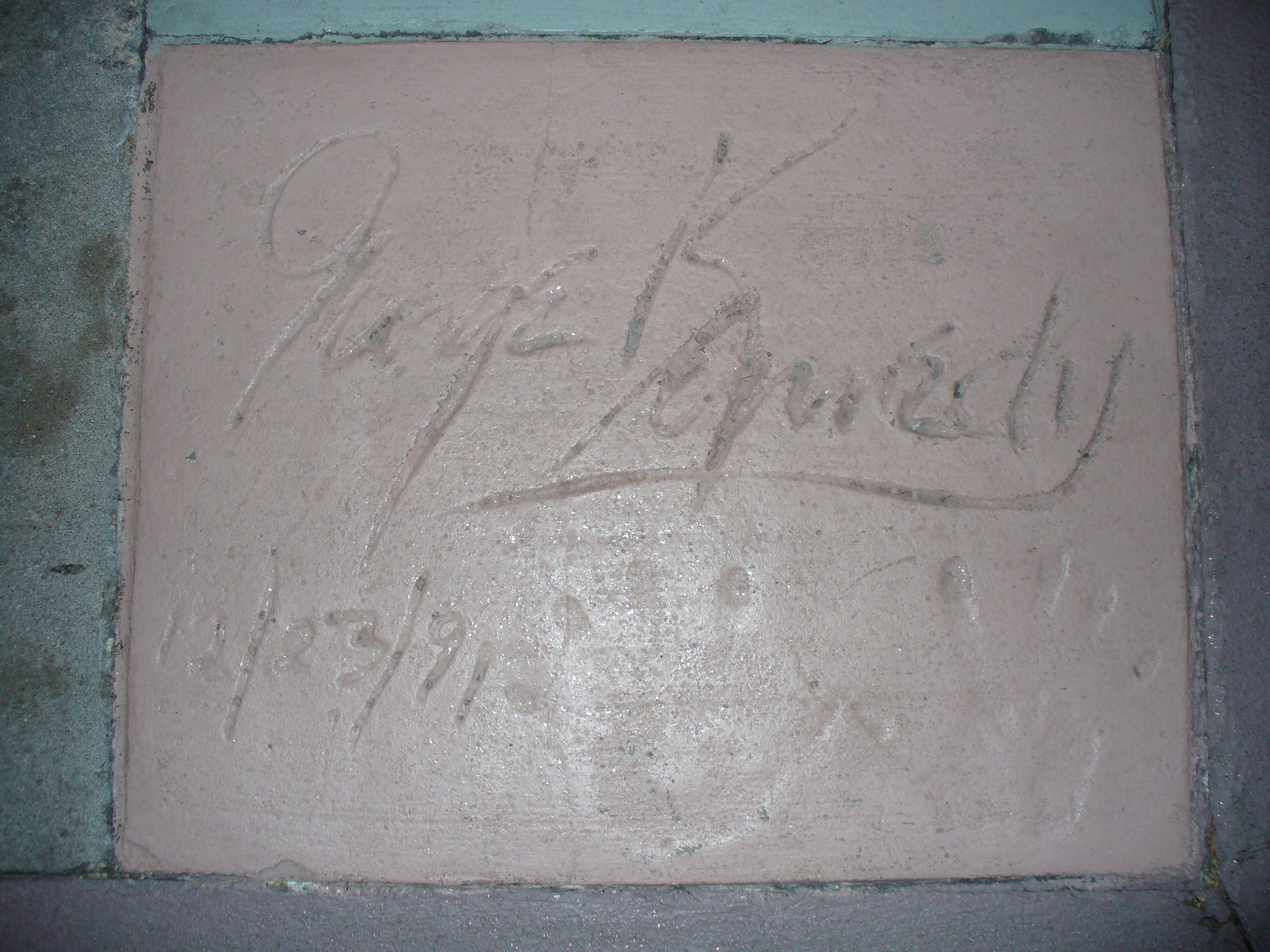
The hand prints of Kennedy in front of The Great Movie Ride at Walt Disney World's Disney's Hollywood Studios theme park

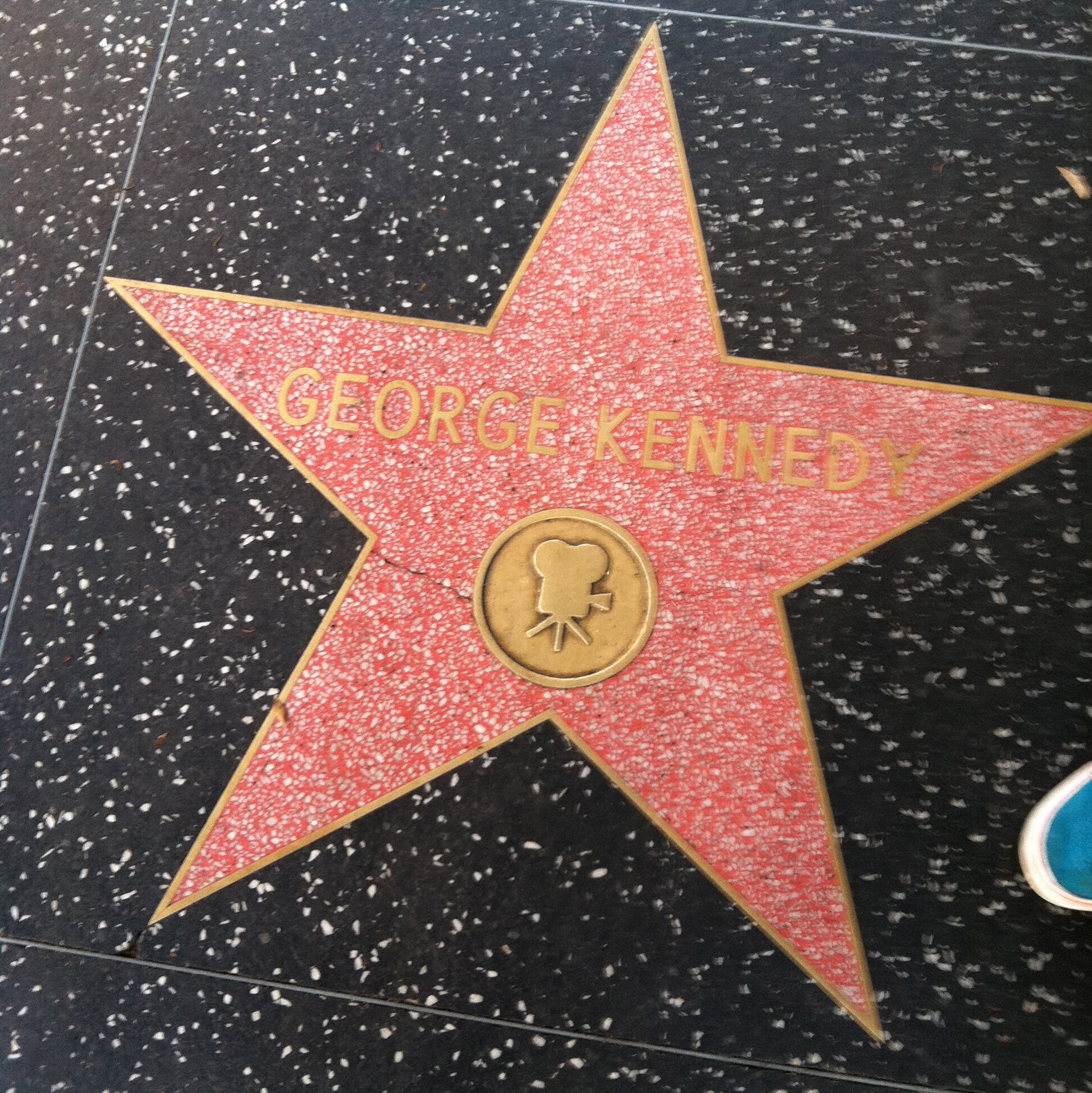
George Kennedy's Star at the Hollywood Walk of Fame

For his contributions to motion pictures, Kennedy received a star on the Hollywood Walk of Fame, at 6352 Hollywood Boulevard in Hollywood, California.

== Writing career ==
Kennedy wrote three books. In 1983, he wrote the murder mystery Murder On Location, set on a film shoot. A second novel, Murder on High, was released in 1984. In 2011, he wrote his autobiography, Trust Me.
