= William Frye (producer) =

American producer

- Born: October 5, 1921; Salinas, California, U.S.
- Died: November 3, 2017 (aged 96); Palm Desert, California, U.S.
- Occupation: Producer
- Years active: 1954–1980

William Frye (October 5, 1921 – November 3, 2017) was an American producer. He served as the producer for the films Airport 1975 and Airport '77 of the Airport film series. Frye died in November 2017 of natural causes at his home in Palm Desert, California, at the age of 96.

== Selected filmography ==
- The Trouble with Angels (1966)
- Where Angels Go, Trouble Follows (1968)
- Airport 1975 (1974)
- Airport '77 (1977)
- Raise the Titanic (1980)
