= Universal Hartland Visual Effects =

Universal Hartland was the visual effects house of Universal Studios Hollywood. The effects studio was in operation from 1978 to 1981. The studio was created as a means for Universal to enter the visual effects field that was growing larger as well as provide in-house effects creation for Battlestar Galactica and Buck Rogers in the 25th Century. Before the facility closed its doors in 1981 it had worked on four films, six television shows (two of which they did effects for the entire run of the show), several Universal Theme Park attractions, some commercials and a few specialty projects, including the special model effects for the Horizons attraction for Disney's Epcot Center and sequences for Disney's Captain EO 3-D attraction.

== History ==
Universal Hartland started work on Universal's feature Buck Rogers in the 25th Century, in Douglas Trumbull's former "Future General Corporation" facilities in Marina Del Ray. In August 1978, they moved production to a newly created studio owned facility in North Hollywood and settled on Hartland Street (hence the name, "Universal Hartland"). This was around the same time that the Industrial Light & Magic crew started working on Battlestar Galactica. During episode two, Universal's management decided to move Battlestar Galactica to their Universal Hartland facility. For the next three years the studio created all of the visual effects for Buck Rogers and Battelstar Galactica. It would also work on The Concorde ... Airport '79, Cheech & Chong's Next Movie, Cosmos, The Nude Bomb, The Thing and model effects for Disney, ABC and NASA.

== Closure ==
Despite the extensive body of work the facility had created, after a change of senior management at the parent company Universal Studios, Universal lost interest in their effects studio and the studio ceased production as Universal Studios owned and operated in-house visual effects facility in 1981, eventually closing completely in the 1985.

== List of films ==
- Battlestar Galactica (TV series)
- Buck Rogers in the 25th Century (movie and TV series)
- The Concorde ... Airport '79
- Cheech and Chong's Next Movie
- The Nude Bomb
- Cosmos (PBS)
- The Thing
- Captain Eo 3-D (visual effects sequences)
