= Don Ingalls =

American novelist

- Born: Donald George Ingalls; July 29, 1918; Humboldt, Nebraska, U.S.
- Died: March 10, 2014 (aged 95); Olympia, Washington, U.S.
- Occupations: Screenwriter and producer
- Known for: Star Trek, Fantasy Island, T.J. Hooker

Donald George Ingalls (July 29, 1918 – March 10, 2014) was an American screenwriter and television producer. During his 35-year career Ingalls wrote scripts for more than 70 episodes of network television, including Adam-12, Bonanza, The Big Valley, Fantasy Island, Gunsmoke, Have Gun-Will Travel, Honey West, Marcus Welby M.D., Police Story, Serpico, Star Trek, and The Virginian. Ingalls also wrote the script for the movie Airport 1975.

He was a lifelong friend of Gene Roddenberry, having served in the Los Angeles Police Department with him.

== Early life and education ==
Ingalls was born in Humboldt, Nebraska on July 29, 1918, the third of Park Louis and Lulu Grace (née Morris) Ingalls' three children. Ingalls spent his childhood living in Stafford, Kansas. The family moved in the 1930s to Los Angeles, California. Ingalls attended North Hollywood High School, and was a reporter for the high school newspaper Blue & Gray.

== Military service ==
Ingalls joined the United States Army Air Forces on December 12, 1942 while working as an accountant at the U.S. Civil Service Commission in Washington, DC.

Ingalls served during the Second World War in Europe as a pilot, flying Boeing B-17 Flying Fortresses. Following the war, he became a test pilot for North American Aviation.

== Early career ==
Ingalls became a police officer and worked under Chief William H. Parker in the Los Angeles Police Department within the Public Information department. Ingalls said "It was a great job. I got to write a lot of different things. It was definitely an exciting field".

Ingalls said the job gave him the experience necessary to excel at writing. “I had never spoken in public before, and here I was writing speeches for the police brass and acting as a spokesman for the department. It really gave me confidence that would later help make me a better writer... I definitely think my experience in the department helped me. I worked on a lot of police shows over the years, and I used my own experiences in my writing".

It was in the police that he met lifelong friend Gene Roddenberry. Both of them transitioned from the Newspaper Unit within the Traffic Department to the new section when Parker was made chief. The pair shared a common background, both of them having been B-17 pilots during the war. Sharing a desire to become writers, they worked together in a single office on the 27th floor of the Los Angeles City Hall. Ingalls was the first to resign from the LAPD to pursue a writing career.

== Screenwriting career ==
=== Television ===
In 1957 Ingalls sold his first script for the ZIV TV show Harbor Command.

Roddenberry and Ingalls had drifted apart following Ingalls' resignation, but reunited early on in their writing careers. Roddenberry was initially the more successful of the two, and recommended Ingalls as story editor to Sam Rolfe on the television series Have Gun – Will Travel. Ingalls' 1957 scripts for Have Gun - Will Travel earned him the position of associate producer. Ingalls became the show's producer in 1962. Roddenberry continued to recommend Ingalls for other screenwriting jobs.

=== Star Trek ===
Roddenberry began to develop Star Trek and sent Ingalls a series outline, asking him to keep it "very, very confidential".

Ingalls wrote two scripts for Star Trek, the first, "The Alternative Factor". His second script, "A Private Little War", was intended to be a criticism piece on the Vietnam War, but was heavily re-written by Roddenberry. Ingalls was angry at him for a year and insisted on being credited only under the pseudonym "Jud Crucis", Latin for "Justice of the Cross".

=== Later television ===
He wrote episodes for a variety of television series, and was a producer on shows including T.J. Hooker and Kingston: Confidential. Starting as a writer, then script editor, he became the producer of the ABC network's Fantasy Island. Ingalls said "I started as a writer, became script editor and then producer. I ended up writing more than 30 episodes in seven years".

=== Films ===
Ingalls also wrote a handful of television movies such as the 1979 Captain America film. He has a single theatrical film credit, Airport 1975 (1974).

=== Books ===
His final work was the novel, Watchers on the Mountain (2005) a fictional work about the Navajo Nation.

== Death ==
He died in 2014 after a long illness at his home in Olympia, Washington.

== Filmography ==
=== Films ===
Year	Film	Credit	Notes
1970	Dial Hot Line	Story by	Television movie, co-wrote story with Carol Sobieski
1972	The Bull of the West	Screenplay by	Television movie, co-wrote screenplay with Richard Fielder
1974	Airport 1975	Screenplay by	Based on the novel Airport By Arthur Hailey
1975	A Matter of Wife... and Death	Written by	Television movie
1976	Flood!	Written by	Television movie
1978	The Initiation of Sarah	Screenplay by	Television movie, co-wrote screenplay with Carol Saraceno and Kenette Gfeller
1979	Captain America	Written by	Television movie

=== Television ===
Year	TV Series	Credit	Notes
1957–58	Harbor Command	Writer	3 episodes
1958–63	Have Gun – Will Travel	Writer, producer, story editor, script editor, associate producer	Multiple episodes
1959	Tombstone Territory	Writer	1 episode
1959	Bat Masterson	Writer	1 episode
1960	Tate	Writer	1 episode
1960	Danger Man	Writer	1 episode
1960	Michael Shayne	Writer	1 episode
1960	Zane Grey Theater	Writer	1 episode
1961	Whiplash	Writer	4 episodes
1961–72	Bonanza	Writer	4 episodes
1962	Shannon	Writer	6 episodes
1963–64	The Travels of Jaimie McPheeters	Writer, producer, associate producer	
1963–69	The Virginian	Writer, producer	
1965	Daniel Boone	Writer	1 episode
1965–66	Honey West	Writer, associate producer	
1966	12 O'Clock High	Associate producer	11 episodes
1966–69	The Big Valley	Writer	5 episodes
1967	Gunsmoke	Writer	2 episodes
1967	The Road West	Writer	1 episode
1967–68	Star Trek: The Original Series	Writer	2 episodes
1968	Cowboy in Africa	Writer	1 episode
1969–70	Then Came Bronson	Writer	2 episodes
1970	Adam-12	Writer	1 episode
1970	Matt Lincoln	Writer	1 episode
1970	Marcus Welby, M.D.	Writer	2 episodes
1970	The Silent Force	Writer	1 episode
1971	The Bold Ones: The New Doctors	Writer	1 episode
1971–72	The Mod Squad	Writer	2 episodes
1972	The Sixth Sense	Writer, executive story consultant, creative consultant	
1973	The Snoop Sisters	Writer	1 episode
1973–75	Police Story	Writer	4 episodes
1974	Doc Elliot	Writer	1 episode
1974	Born Free	Writer	1 episode
1976	Serpico	Producer	Unknown episodes
1977	Kingston: Confidential	Writer, producer	
1979	A Man Called Sloane	Writer	1 episode
1979–84	Fantasy Island	Writer, director, producer, executive story consultant	
1985–86	T.J. Hooker	Writer, producer	
