= Little Girl Lost (film) =

1988 television film directed by Sharron Miller

- Screenplay by: Ann M. Beckett
- Story by: Angela Shelley; C. Scott Alsop
- Directed by: Sharron Miller
- Starring: Tess Harper; Frederic Forrest; Patricia Kalember
- Composer: Billy Goldenberg
- Country of origin: United States
- Original language: English

Production
- Executive producer: Marian Rees
- Producer: Robert Huddleston
- Cinematography: Philip H. Lathrop
- Editor: Art Stafford
- Running time: 94 minutes
- Production companies: Marian Rees Associates; Vantage Entertainment Group

Original release
- Network: ABC
- Release: April 25, 1988

Little Girl Lost is an American drama television film directed by Sharron Miller from a teleplay by Ann M. Beckett, based on a story by Angela Shelley and C. Scott Alsop. The film stars Tess Harper, Frederic Forrest, and Patricia Kalember, with Lawrence Pressman, Christopher McDonald, Sandy Martin, Joel Colodner, William Edward Phipps, and Marie Martin in supporting roles. It premiered on ABC on April 25, 1988, and earned a Primetime Emmy Award nomination for its cinematography.

== Plot ==
A girl named Tella had been placed with foster parents Clara and Tim Brady when she was one-year-old due to neglect. When Tella was three the law forced her to have visitation with her biological father. One night during bath time then four-year-old Tella tells Clara her father touches her "down there" and she wonders if it's because she's a bad girl. The Bradys inform Children's Services they suspect child sexual abuse but Children's Services and the court side with the father, believing Tella is making up stories, and her foster parents are allowing her to act out.

The court has Tella taken from the Brady's home and, though they obtain help from an attorney and a local reporter, they must endure a two-year struggle to regain custody of their beloved lost child. In the end an older and quieter Tella is taken back to the Bradys' home, and slowly remembers she had once been happy there, and is now back with people who love her.

== Cast ==
- Frederic Forrest as Tim Brady
- Tess Harper as Clara Brady
- Kathy Tragester as Kelly Brady
- Marie Martin as Tella Brady
- Christopher McDonald as Wolff
- Sandy Martin as Violet Young
- Matthew Scott Carlton as Nathan Lees
- C. Jack Robinson as Judge Greer
- Gigi Cervantes as Brandy
- Rudy Young as Ed De Busk
- Annabelle Weenick as Gwynneth Soames
- Esther Benson as Mrs. Morella
- Suzanne Savoy as Dr. Deborah Meewsen
- Gil Glasgow as Police Officer
- Lee Ritchey as Earl Lockwood
- Libby Villari as Harriet Baker
- Deborah Winters as File Clerk
- Vernon Grote as Bailiff
- Hugh Feagin as Bruce Magnusen
- Lawrence Pressman as Lester

== Awards and nominations ==
Year	Award	Category	Recipient	Result	Ref.
1988	40th Primetime Creative Arts Emmy Awards	Outstanding Cinematography for a Miniseries or a Special	Philip H. Lathrop	Nominated	
1989	3rd American Society of Cinematographers Awards	Outstanding Achievement in Cinematography in a Movie of the Week or Pilot	Philip H. Lathrop	Won	
1989	10th Youth in Film Awards	Best Young Actress Under 9 Years of Age	Marie Martin	Nominated	
1989	10th Youth in Film Awards	Best Family TV Special	Little Girl Lost	Nominated	
