= Mickey S. Michaels =

American set decorator (1931–1999)

- Born: October 9, 1931; Santa Monica, California
- Died: March 20, 1999 (aged 67); Los Angeles, California
- Occupation: Set decorator
- Years active: 1970-1996

Mickey S. Michaels (October 9, 1931 – March 20, 1999) was an American set decorator. He was nominated for two Academy Awards in the category Best Art Direction.

== Selected filmography ==
Michaels was nominated for two Academy Awards for Best Art Direction:

- Airport (1970)
- Airport '77 (1977)
