= Airport (Hailey novel) =

1968 novel by Arthur Hailey

- First Edition (US)
- Author: Arthur Hailey
- Language: English
- Publisher: Doubleday (US); Michael Joseph (UK)
- Publication date: 1968
- Publication place: United States
- Pages: 440
- Preceded by: Hotel
- Followed by: Wheels

Airport is a novel by British-Canadian writer Arthur Hailey. Published by Doubleday in 1968, the story concerns a large metropolitan airport and its operations during a severe winter storm.

== Plot ==
The story takes place at Lincoln International, a fictional Chicago airport based very loosely on O'Hare International Airport.

The action mainly centers on Mel Bakersfeld, the Airport General Manager. His devotion to his job is tearing apart his family and his marriage to his nagging wife Cindy, who resents his use of his job at the airport as a device to avoid going to various after-hours events she wants him to participate in, as she attempts to climb into the social circles of Chicago's elite. His problems in his marriage are further exacerbated by his romantically charged friendship with a lovely divorcee from Trans America Airlines, who is their passenger relations manager, Tanya Livingston.

The story takes place mainly over the course of one evening and night, as a massive snowstorm wreaks havoc on airport operations. The storyline centers on Bakersfeld's struggles to keep the airport open during the storm. His chief problem is the unexpected closure of primary Runway 30 (runway 29 in the subsequent film), caused when a departing airliner for a Mexican airline (in the film, an arriving airplane of the same airline as the flight to Rome) turns off past the wrong side of a runway marker light, burying the plane's landing gear in the snow and blocking the runway. This becomes a major problem as another airplane, Trans America Flight Two, experiences a midair emergency, aborts the flight to Rome and returns to Lincoln. This requires runway 30 to be made operational — at any cost.

The closing of runway 30 requires the use of shorter runway 25 (runway 22 in the subsequent film), which has the unfortunate consequence of causing planes to take off over a noise-sensitive suburb, whose residents picket the airport in protest. The shorter runway 25 is also later inadequate to land the returning airplane, which has suffered major structural and mechanical damage due to explosive decompression caused by the detonation of the bomb brought on board.

== Major characters ==
Mel Bakersfeld is the main character around whom the book revolves. He is General Manager of Lincoln International Airport.

Tanya Livingston is Mel's love interest. She works for Trans America Airlines, and Mel often visits her. She was deserted by her husband, and has a daughter with him. Though there are rumors of her bedding Mel, however, those are untrue.

Joe Patroni is the tough and practical head of maintenance operations for Trans World Airlines (TWA) at Lincoln. He is drafted by Bakersfeld to move the disabled aircraft blocking runway 30. He fights to do so under the aircraft's own power without damaging it. This is in spite of the emergency, which could require the airplane be pushed off by snow plows (which would destroy the aircraft). His character is also the only one to continue in the "inspired" sequels to the film.

D. O. Guerrero is an increasingly psychologically disturbed bankrupt building contractor, who is determined to find a way to solve his financial problems, regardless of what it will cost others. He builds a carry-on suitcase bomb that he takes onto Trans America Flight Two, "The Golden Argosy", a Rome-bound Boeing 707, in the hope of providing an insurance-fraud death benefit to his wife (similar to the actual event of Continental Airlines Flight 11). The bombing plot is almost foiled with the assistance of an elderly lady, Ada Quonsett, a habitual stowaway, whose help is enlisted by the flight crew, but another meddling passenger defeats the crew's efforts.

Vernon Demerest is a pompous and self-confident senior pilot for Trans America Airlines and brother-in-law to Bakersfeld. He opposes him on a number of issues of policy. Despite his overbearing attitude, he is an expert pilot who helps to bring Flight Two home safely, although the actual flying is done by Captain Anson Harris, an equally expert pilot who is being given his final "check ride" by Demerest before being certified for international flight captaincy.

Gwen Meighen is a senior Trans America Airlines stewardess on Flight Two and Vernon's lover. Before taking off, she reveals to him that she is pregnant. She is badly injured by the bomb set off by Guerrero, but survives.

A mostly separate plot line concerns Mel's brother Keith, an air traffic controller tormented by guilt and flashbacks, due to his self-blame of not realizing the imminent danger of a mid-air collision and failing to take steps to prevent it from happening. Other plot lines focus on Cindy Bakersfeld's social aspirations, the ambitious lawyer leading an ultimately doomed effort to sue the airport for noise over his clients' homes, and a disagreement between Mel and Vernon over flight insurance sales.

== Background ==
Earlier in his writing career, Hailey also wrote the television play Flight into Danger (1956) which was later remade as the films Zero Hour! (1957) and Terror in the Sky (1971). The plot of Zero Hour! is parodied in the comedy spoof Airplane! (1980).

== Reception ==
Airport did not receive positive reviews in The New York Times: Martin Levin said, "Mr. Hailey is a plodding sort of writer, but he has just the talent to suggest the crashing ennui of airport routine, where only a mortal disaster can provide color." In the same newspaper, Eliot Fremont-Smith wrote, "As for the formula, the possibilities seem all but inexhaustible. With 'Hotel' and 'Airport' successfully absorbed, can 'Shopping Center,' 'Parking Lot' and 'City Dump' be far behind?"

Still, the book was commercially successful among readers, and would continue Hailey's success from the previous Hotel. It spent 64 weeks on the New York Times best seller list, 30 of which were at #1, and became the biggest-selling novel of 1968.

== Films ==
George Seaton wrote and directed the film adaptation, which was released by Universal in 1970. Starring Burt Lancaster, Dean Martin, Jean Seberg, Jacqueline Bisset, and George Kennedy, the film was nominated for ten Academy Awards, including Best Picture. It earned $100.5 million at the domestic box office (the equivalent of $833 million in 2025). Its success, combined with that of 1972's The Poseidon Adventure, led to the proliferation of "disaster movies" of the 1970s. Airport itself spawned three sequels, each progressively less successful: Airport 1975 (1974; $47.3 million domestic), Airport '77 (1977; $30 million), and The Concorde... Airport '79 (1979; $13 million).
