= J. Terry Williams =

American film editor (1930–2015)

- Born: August 25, 1930
- Died: March 22, 2015 (aged 84)
- Other name: Terry Williams
- Occupation: Film editor
- Years active: 1962–1991

J. Terry Williams (August 25, 1930 – March 22, 2015) was an American film editor credited on about thirty feature films and television movies. He was nominated at the 39th Academy Awards for Best Film Editing for the film The Russians Are Coming, the Russians Are Coming (1966). His nomination was shared with Hal Ashby.

He mainly worked on TV movies, as well as a couple of episodes of the TV show McMillan & Wife. Williams died in 2015.

== Filmography ==
- The Hit Man (1991)
- Twist of Fate (1989)
- Still Crazy Like a Fox (1987)
- The Other Lover (1985)
- A Touch of Scandal (1984)
- Malibu (1983)
- Sadat (1983)
- Thursday's Child (1983)
- Goldie and the Boxer Go to Hollywood (1981)
- Goliath Awaits (1981)
- Raise the Titanic (1980)
- Goldie and the Boxer (1979)
- Institute for Revenge (1979)
- Pleasure Cove (1979)
- A Fire in the Sky (1978)
- Superdome (1978)
- Airport '77 (1977)
- Family Plot (1976)
- Jim the World's Greatest (1976)
- Airport 1975 (1974)
- The Elevator (1974)
- Heat Wave! (1974)
- The Questor Tapes (1974)
- The Wrath of God (1972)
- The Beloved (1970)
- Hornets' Nest (1970) (as Terry Williams)
- Eye of the Cat (1969)
- House of Cards (1968)
- The Secret War of Harry Frigg (1968)
- Banning (1967)
- The Russians Are Coming, the Russians Are Coming (1966)
- Send Me No Flowers (1964)
- To Kill a Mockingbird (1962) (assistant editor, uncredited)
