= Philip H. Lathrop =

American cinematographer (1912–1995)

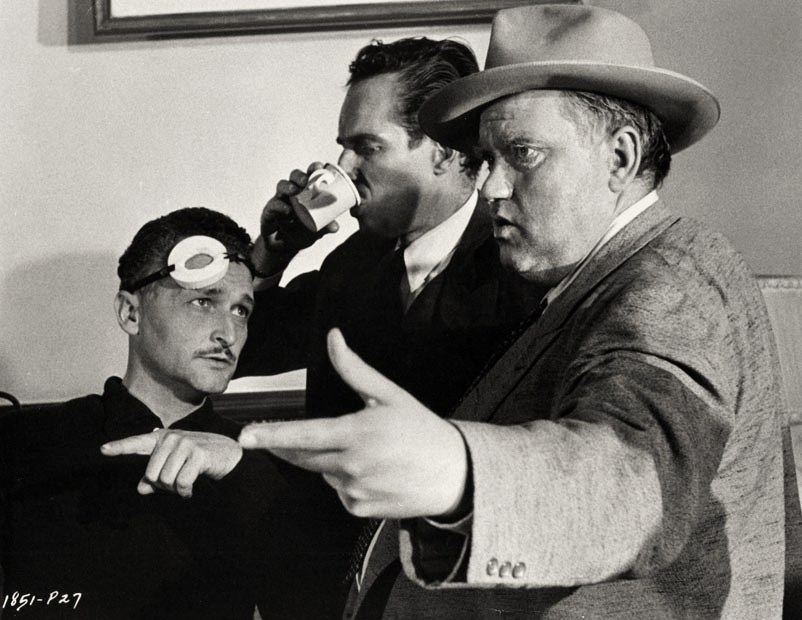
- From left-to-right: Lathrop, Charlton Heston and Orson Welles, on the set of Touch of Evil (1958).
- Born: October 22, 1912; Merced, California, U.S.
- Died: April 12, 1995 (aged 82); Los Angeles, California, U.S.
- Occupation: Cinematographer
- Awards: See below

Philip H. Lathrop, ASC (October 22, 1912 – April 12, 1995) was an American cinematographer noted for his skills with wide screen technology and detailed approach to lighting and camera placement. He was a notable collaborator of director Blake Edwards, working on ten of his productions between 1958 and 1971. He was twice nominated for the Academy Award for Best Cinematography, for The Americanization of Emily (1964) and Earthquake (1974). He was also a two-time Primetime Emmy Award winner.

Lathrop was a long-time member of the ASC Board of Directors, as well as co-chairman of the ASC Awards committee. He received the ASC's Lifetime Achievement Award in 1992. He also participated in the affairs of the Academy of Motion Picture Arts and Sciences and the Academy of Television Arts and Sciences.

== Early life ==
Lathrop was born in Merced, California, on October 22, 1912. As a child, the Universal Studios lot was his playground, where his mother was employed in the film lab. Lathrop became a member there in the camera department at 18-years old. There, he watched Gilbert Warrenton photograph the first version of Show Boat in 1928–29. On the 1936 version of the film, Lathrop loaded cameras from John Mescall.

== Career ==
Lathrop began his career as a film loader in Universal’s camera department in 1934 for Russell Metty, ASC, on the Irving Reis film, All My Sons.

In 1938, he became assistant to Universal’s top-ranking cinematographer Joseph A. Valentine, ASC, and worked on the Deanna Durbin pictures, The Wolf Man, and two Alfred Hitchcock classics, Saboteur and Shadow of a Doubt. Later, he once again worked as a camera operator with Metty for nine years where he shot the opening of Orson Welles’ Touch of Evil, one of the most renowned tracking shots in the history of cinema.

Lathrop becomes director of photography at Universal in 1958. His first feature that year was The Perfect Furlough, which was shot in CinemaScope and Eastman Color, with director Blake Edwards, whom he subsequently worked with on seven more films, including Experiment in Terror, Days of Wine and Roses, and The Pink Panther. In 1959, Lathrop and Edwards collaborated on the television series, Peter Gunn and Mr. Lucky.

Using the new Panavision lenses, Lathrop shot the 1962 black and white drama, Lonely Are the Brave, with director David Miller in New Mexico’s Sandia Mountains—this is an early example of the 2.35:1 aspect ratio. Lathrop’s particular visual style seems to epitomize the times, such as in Point Blank, directed by John Boorman in 1967, where a glossy, dense feel was utilized to a tough thriller. In this film, color charts were prepared for each scene—the colors were subdued and desaturated and no scene was ever too bright or showy. After Point Blank, Lathrop worked on Francis Ford Coppola’s Finian’s Rainbow, another unusual color film.

He was inducted into the ASC Hall of Fame in 1974. During the 1980s, Lathrop worked on eight television movies-of-the-week as well as several mini-series, winning him two Primetime Emmys.

His last theatrical film as cinematographer was Wes Craven's horror film Deadly Friend (1986). The following year, he shot the comedic short film Ray’s Male Heterosexual Dance Hall, which won the Academy Award for Best Live Action Short Film.

=== Earthquake ===
In the 1974 disaster film Earthquake, Lathrop made director Mark Robson’s vision of the movie come true. Robson wanted a natural look for the film, without its being documentary-like. Instead of shooting in natural locations, Earthquake was filmed almost entirely on the Universal Studios' sound stages and back-lot due to the extraordinary degree of control deemed necessary to execute the required special effects. To bring the earthquake scenes to life, a shaker mount for the camera was created. Lathrop said it “created an amazing illusion. You’d swear that the ground was going up and down and moving sideways, when, of course, it wasn’t moving at all.” Sets were also built on shaker platforms, which is incredibly costly so “in the sets that were not on shaker platforms, [it] was [difficult] to get the actors to move as if they were responding to an earthquake, when there wasn’t one,” he added.

A five-story section of what is supposed to be a 25-story building was made in Stage 12, the highest in the studio, where every floor was used to shoot the action. Lathrop stated that “it was necessary to dig down 20 feet into the floor of the stage in order to accommodate [the building model].” He continued, “[the] photography of this sequence was difficult because of the way [they] had to light the set” to avoid shadows from the hanging lights when the simulated earthquakes took place. So “in order to light it, [Lathrop] went clear up above the grids with four arcs pointed down to simulate the angle of the sun. [He] matched each of the arcs on the way down and didn’t overlap them, nor did [he] use any fill light at all.”

To execute a film like Earthquake, natural sets would have been very limiting. Shooting on set allows for control in the lighting and to “do things with the camera that would have been impossible in a natural set,” said Lathrop. Without a single day off of work after Earthquake, Lathrop immediately began working on Airport 1975, also for Universal Studios.

== Personal life ==
Lathrop had two marriages, to Molly Lathrop and Betty Jo Lathrop, and three sons, Larry, Bill and Clark.

=== Death ===
He died of cancer on April 12, 1995, in Los Angeles, the same year he was honored with the 1992 ASC Lifetime Achievement Award. Services were held at the Forest Lawn Cemetery in Hollywood Hills where Stanley Cortez, ASC, delivered the eulogy.

== Filmography ==
=== Film ===
Year	Title	Director	Notes
1958	Live Fast, Die Young	Paul Henreid	
1958	Girls on the Loose	Paul Henreid	
1958	The Saga of Hemp Brown	Richard Carlson	
1958	Wild Heritage	Charles F. Haas	
1958	The Perfect Furlough	Blake Edwards	1st of 9 collaborations with Edwards
1958	Money, Women and Guns	Richard Bartlett	
1958	The Monster of Piedras Blancas	Irvin Berwick	
1959	Cry Tough	Paul Stanley	with Irving Glassberg
1960	The Private Lives of Adam and Eve	Mickey Rooney; Albert Zugsmith	
1961	Breakfast at Tiffany’s	Blake Edwards	Uncredited reshoots
1962	Experiment in Terror	Blake Edwards	
1962	Lonely Are the Brave	David Miller	
1962	Days of Wine and Roses	Blake Edwards	
1963	Dime with a Halo	Boris Sagal	
1963	Twilight of Honor	Boris Sagal	
1963	Soldier in the Rain	Ralph Nelson	
1963	The Pink Panther	Blake Edwards	
1964	The Americanization of Emily	Arthur Hiller	
1964	36 Hours	George Seaton	
1965	Girl Happy	Boris Sagal	
1965	The Cincinnati Kid	Norman Jewison	
1965	Never Too Late	Bud Yorkin	
1966	What Did You Do in the War, Daddy?	Blake Edwards	
1967	The Happening	Elliot Silverstein	
1967	Don't Make Waves	Alexander Mackendrick	
1967	Gunn	Blake Edwards	
1967	Point Blank	John Boorman	
1968	I Love You, Alice B. Toklas!	Hy Averback	
1968	Finian’s Rainbow	Francis Ford Coppola	
1969	The Illustrated Man	Jack Smight	
1969	The Gypsy Moths	John Frankenheimer	
1969	They Shoot Horses, Don’t They?	Sydney Pollack	
1970	The Hawaiians	Tom Gries	
1970	The Traveling Executioner	Jack Smight	
1970	Rabbit, Run	Jack Smight	
1971	Wild Rovers	Blake Edwards	
1972	Every Little Crook and Nanny	Cy Howard	
1972	Portnoy’s Complaint	Ernest Lehman	
1973	Lolly-Madonna XXX	Richard C. Sarafian	
1973	The Thief Who Came to Dinner	Bud Yorkin	
1973	The All-American Boy	Charles K. Eastman	
1974	Mame	Gene Saks	
1974	Together Brothers	William Graham	with Charles Rosher Jr.
1974	Airport 1975	Jack Smight	
1974	Earthquake	Mark Robson	
1975	The Prisoner of Second Avenue	Melvin Frank	
1975	Hard Times	Walter Hill	
1975	The Killer Elite	Sam Peckinpah	
1975	The Black Bird	David Giler	
1976	Swashbuckler	James Goldstone	
1977	Airport '77	Jerry Jameson	
1978	A Different Story	Paul Aaron	
1978	The Driver	Walter Hill	
1978	Moment by Moment	Jane Wagner	
1979	The Concorde... Airport '79	David Lowell Rich	
1980	Little Miss Marker	Walter Bernstein	
1980	Loving Couples	Jack Smight	
1980	Foolin' Around	Richard T. Heffron	
1980	A Change of Seasons	Richard Lang	
1981	All Night Long	Jean-Claude Tramont	
1982	National Lampoon's Class Reunion	Michael Miller	
1982	Hammett	Wim Wenders	with Joseph Biroc
1982	Jekyll and Hyde... Together Again	Jerry Belson	
1986	Deadly Friend	Wes Craven	
1987	Ray’s Male Heterosexual Dance Hall	Bryan Gordon	Short film

=== Television ===
Year	Title	Notes
1958	Rawhide	9 episodes
1959–60	Mr. Lucky	25 episodes
1959	Walt Disney’s Wonderful World of Color	2 episodes
1959	Steve Canyon	11 episodes
1959–60	Peter Gunn	61 episodes
1960–61	Hong Kong	24 episodes
1961	Perry Mason	2 episodes
1961	Combat!	1 episode
1962	Sam Benedict	1 episode
1963	Vacation Playhouse	1 episode
1965	Profiles in Courage	2 episodes
1975	Three for the Road	1 episode
1977	The Feather and Father Gang	1 episode

==== TV films and miniseries ====
Year	Title	Director	Notes
1976	What Now, Catherine Curtis?	Charles Walters	
1977	Never Con a Killer	Buzz Kulik	
1977	Captains Courageous	Harvey Hart	
1984	Celebrity	Paul Wendkos	
1985	Malice in Wonderland	Gus Trikonis	
1985	Love on the Run	Gus Trikonis	
1985	Picking Up the Pieces	Paul Wendkos	
1985	Between the Darkness and the Dawn	Peter Levin	
1986	Mr. and Mrs. Ryan	Peter H. Hunt	
1986	Christmas Snow	Gus Trikonis	
1987	Six Against the Rock	Paul Wendkos	
1988	Little Girl Lost	Sharron Miller	

== Awards and nominations ==
Award	Year	Category	Work	Result	Ref.
Academy Award	1965	Best Cinematography (Black-and-White)	The Americanization of Emily	Nominated	
Academy Award	1975	Best Cinematography	Earthquake	Nominated	
American Society of Cinematographers Award	1988	Outstanding Achievement in Cinematography in Motion Picture, Limited Series, or Pilot Made for Television	Christmas Snow	Won	
American Society of Cinematographers Award	1989	Outstanding Achievement in Cinematography in Motion Picture, Limited Series, or Pilot Made for Television	Little Girl Lost	Won	
Primetime Emmy Award	1984	Outstanding Cinematography for a Limited or Anthology Series or Movie	Celebrity	Nominated	
Primetime Emmy Award	1985	Outstanding Cinematography for a Limited or Anthology Series or Movie	Malice in Wonderland	Won	
Primetime Emmy Award	1986	Outstanding Cinematography for a Limited or Anthology Series or Movie	Picking Up the Pieces	Nominated	
Primetime Emmy Award	1987	Outstanding Cinematography for a Limited or Anthology Series or Movie	Christmas Snow	Won	
Primetime Emmy Award	1988	Outstanding Cinematography for a Limited or Anthology Series or Movie	Little Girl Lost	Nominated	
