= Airport 1975 =

1974 American disaster film

Airport 75
- Theatrical release poster by George Akimoto
- Directed by: Jack Smight
- Written by: Don Ingalls
- Based on: Characters; 1968 novel by Arthur Hailey
- Produced by: William Frye
- Starring: Charlton Heston; Karen Black; George Kennedy; Gloria Swanson; Efrem Zimbalist Jr.; Susan Clark; Sid Caesar; Linda Blair; Dana Andrews; Roy Thinnes; Nancy Olson; Ed Nelson; Myrna Loy; Martha Scott; Augusta Summerland; Helen Reddy
- Cinematography: Philip H. Lathrop
- Edited by: J. Terry Williams
- Music by: John Cacavas
- Production company: Universal Pictures
- Distributed by: Universal Pictures
- Release date: October 18, 1974
- Running time: 106 minutes
- Country: United States
- Language: English
- Budget: $3 million
- Box office: $103 million

Airport 75 (also known as Airport 1975) is a 1974 American disaster film, and the second installment in the Airport film series. It is directed by Jack Smight, produced by William Frye, and from a screenplay by Don Ingalls. The film stars Charlton Heston, Karen Black, George Kennedy, Efrem Zimbalist Jr., Susan Clark, Sid Caesar, Linda Blair, Dana Andrews, Roy Thinnes, Nancy Olson, Ed Nelson, Myrna Loy, Martha Scott, Augusta Summerland, Erik Estrada, Helen Reddy (whose performance garnered her a Golden Globe Award nomination), in her film debut, and Gloria Swanson in her final film role.

The plot concerns the dramatic events aboard an airborne Boeing 747 when a small aircraft crashes into the cockpit, causing the fatalities of the First Officer and Flight Engineer and the blinding of the Captain, leaving no one aboard qualified to take the controls.

Airport 1975 was released by Universal Pictures on October 18, 1974. Despite generally poor reviews, the film was a commercial success, becoming the seventh highest-grossing movie of 1974 at the US and Canada box office.

== Plot ==
Columbia Airlines Flight 409 is a Boeing 747 on a red-eye flight from Washington Dulles International Airport to Los Angeles International Airport, while Scott Freeman is a businessman flying his private Beechcraft Baron to a sales meeting in Boise, Idaho. When an occluded front severely reduces visibility along the entire West Coast of the United States, Columbia 409 and Freeman's Beechcraft are diverted to Salt Lake City International Airport.

Columbia 409 is ordered to land ahead of Freeman's Beechcraft and First Officer Urias unlocks himself from his seat to check out a vibration. Freeman suffers a heart attack and ascends uncontrollably, slamming into Columbia 409. The collision rips a hole above the co-pilot seat, ejecting Urias, killing the flight engineer and blinding Captain Stacy, the pilot. Stacy engages the autopilot and altitude hold before losing consciousness. Nancy Pryor, the First Stewardess, informs the Salt Lake control tower there is no one to fly the plane.

Joe Patroni, Columbia's Vice President of Operations, whose wife Helen and son Joseph Jr. are amongst the passengers, is apprised of Columbia 409's situation. He seeks the advice of Captain Al Murdock, Columbia's chief flight instructor, who also happens to be Nancy's estranged boyfriend. Patroni and Murdock take the airline's executive jet to Salt Lake. Nancy reports by radio that the autopilot is keeping the aircraft level, but is inoperable for turns and the jet is headed into the mountains of the Wasatch Range. Murdock instructs Nancy on turning the plane manually before radio communications are interrupted.

Unable to talk Nancy down through the mountains to a safe landing, a military helicopter is dispatched to attempt an air-to-air rescue. Nancy realizes the aircraft is too low heading towards the mountains and Captain Stacy helps her successfully accelerate the engines to gain power and climb over them. When the rescue helicopter arrives, replacement pilot Major John Alexander is released towards the stricken airliner but the release cord from his harness becomes caught in the jagged metal around the hole, unhooking him from the tether, and he falls from the aircraft.

The only other person on the helicopter who can land a 747 is Murdock, and he is successfully lowered into the cockpit of the airliner. He lands the plane safely at Salt Lake City International Airport and uses high speed taxiing maneuvers when dropping brake pressure threatens his ability to stop the plane on the ground. The flight attendants successfully conduct an emergency evacuation of the passengers via the evacuation slides, as Nancy and Murdock reconcile.

== Cast ==
- Charlton Heston as Capt. Alan Murdock
- Karen Black as Nancy Pryor, First Stewardess
- George Kennedy as Joe Patroni
- Efrem Zimbalist Jr. as Capt. Stacy
- Susan Clark as Mrs. Helen Patroni
- Brian Morrison as Joe Patroni, Jr
- Helen Reddy as Sister Ruth
- Linda Blair as Janice Abbott
- Dana Andrews as Scott Freeman
- Roy Thinnes as Co-Capt. Urias
- Sid Caesar as Barney
- Myrna Loy as Mrs. Devaney
- Ed Nelson as Major Alexander
- Nancy Olson as Mrs. Abbott
- Larry Storch as Glenn Purcell, reporter
- Martha Scott as Sister Beatrice
- Jerry Stiller as Sam
- Norman Fell as Bill
- Conrad Janis as Arnie
- Beverly Garland as Mrs. Scott Freeman
- Gloria Swanson as herself
- Augusta Summerland as Winnie Griffith, Swanson's secretary
- Guy Stockwell as Colonel Moss
- Erik Estrada as Flight Engineer Julio
- Christopher Norris as Bette, stewardess
- Irene Tsu as Carol, stewardess
- Lara Parker as Lara, stewardess
- Laurette Spang as Arlene, stewardess
- Sharon Gless as Sharon
- Terry Lester as Mr. Kelly

In addition, NFL player and future (1980, 1983) Super Bowl-winning quarterback Jim Plunkett has an uncredited cameo as himself.

== Production ==
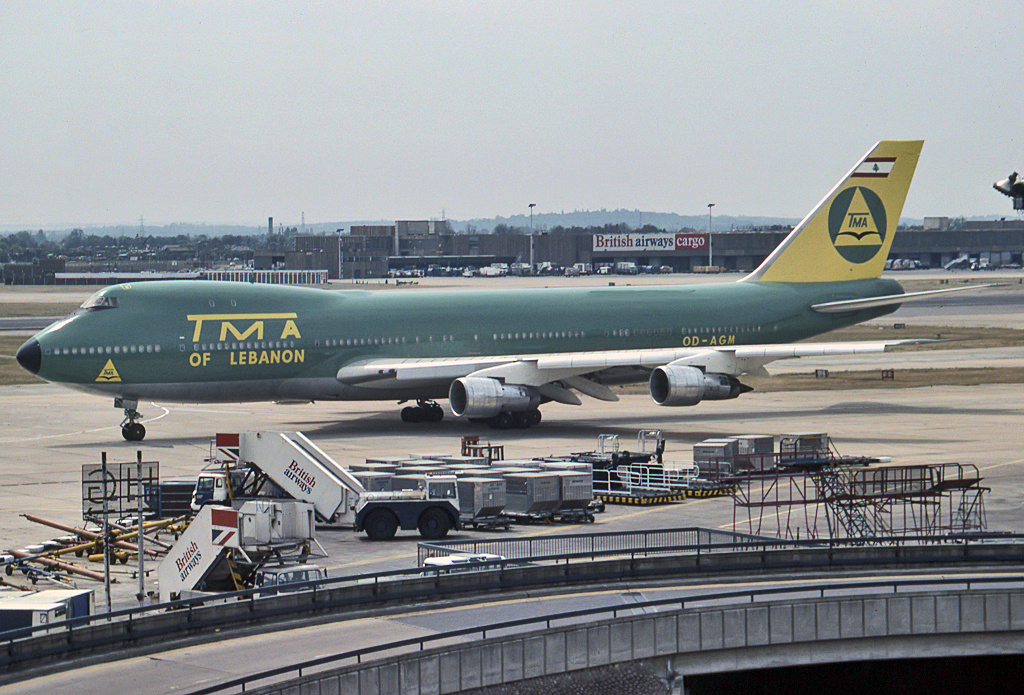
The aircraft used in the filming, two years later in 1976, operating for Trans Mediterranean Airways.

Airport 1975 used a Boeing 747-123 (s/n 20390. Registration N9675), rented from American Airlines when it was temporarily taken out of passenger service at the start of American's restructuring away from the fleet of Boeing jumbo jets in mid-1974. The aircraft was leased to Trans Mediterranean Airways briefly in 1976, before returning and being converted into an "American Freighter" variant. In 1984, the aircraft was sold to UPS, where it continued to serve as a freighter for over 20 years before being retired to desert storage in 2005, then scrapped in 2011.

The film was shot on location at Salt Lake City International Airport. Aerials shots over Heber City, Utah and the Wasatch Mountains are included. The airport interior scenes were shot extensively at Washington Dulles International, which features heavily in the opening credits and the early portion of the film. In the film, Dulles is depicted in its original, unextended form, showing the mobile lounges which originally took all passengers to and from the main terminal building directly to the aircraft—this arrangement has largely been replaced with satellite concourses served by an underground people mover system.

As Sister Ruth, Helen Reddy performs a solo acoustic version of her song "Best Friend" (originally on her 1971 debut album I Don't Know How to Love Him) to an ailing Janice Abbott (Linda Blair). The song was written by Reddy and Ray Burton, who also co-wrote her hit single "I Am Woman".

== Release ==
=== Home media ===
MCA Home Video released Airport 1975 on VHS and Beta in 1986. In 1987, MCA licensed the title to Goodtimes Home Video, who reissued the film on VHS. In January, 1995, MCA Universal Home Video released the film on LaserDisc. It was first released on DVD in April, 1998 by Goodtimes, and Universal later included the title in a “Terminal Pack” collection containing all four Airport films in February, 2004. It was released on Blu-ray by Universal in June, 2016 as part of “The Complete Collection” of Airport films. Kino Lorber released both a 4K UHD/Blu-ray 2-disc set as well as a single Blu-ray disc edition on September 30, 2025. This was followed by their release of "Airport: The Complete 4-Film Collection" in separate 4K UHD and Blu-ray 4-disc editions on November 18, 2025.

== Reception ==
=== Box office ===
Airport 1975 was a massive commercial success. In its first week of release from 144 theatres, it grossed $2,737,995. With a budget of $3 million, the film grossed $47.3 million in the United States and Canada at the box office, making it the seventh highest-grossing film of 1974 and the year's third highest-grossing disaster film, behind The Towering Inferno and Earthquake. The film grossed $55.7 million internationally for a worldwide total of $103 million.

=== Critical reception ===
Critical reception was mainly unfavorable, with The New Yorker magazine's film critic Pauline Kael calling the picture "cut-rate swill [...] produced on a TV-movie budget by mercenary businessmen." Kael also thought the audio problems gave Karen Black's voice a metallic sound that was grating and that the main character, a stewardess, was constantly being patronized by men. Roger Ebert was less condemnatory, awarding two-and-a-half stars out of four and describing it as "corny escapism", although he made a similar observation about Black's character—that she is made to seem incompetent simply because she is a woman. Gene Siskel also gave the film two-and-a-half stars out of four, calling the collision scene "both a surprise and well executed", but the scenes afterward "both implausible and dull". Vincent Canby of The New York Times called the film "silly" and suffering from "a total lack of awareness of how comic it is when it's attempting to be most serious". Kevin Thomas of the Los Angeles Times wrote "Whatever its flaws, Airport generated plenty of suspense and was lots of fun; Airport 1975 is too much a rehash to seem anything but mechanical and finally silly in its predictability." Gary Arnold of The Washington Post stated, "It may get by at the box-office, but it's a hasty, superfluous job of formula moviemaking." David McGillivray of The Monthly Film Bulletin wrote that "despite a sterling performance from Karen Black, convincingly petrified as the stewardess expected to negotiate the plane through the mountains, the tension never coalesces."

On the review aggregator website Rotten Tomatoes, 32% of 22 critics' reviews are positive. Airport 1975 was included in the book The Fifty Worst Films of All Time published in 1978. The film is listed in Golden Raspberry Award founder John J.B. Wilson's book The Official Razzie Movie Guide as one of The 100 Most Enjoyably Bad Movies Ever Made.

=== Awards and nominations ===
Ceremony	Category	Nominee(s)	Result	Ref.
32nd Golden Globe Awards	Most Promising Newcomer – Female	Helen Reddy	Nominated	

The film was nominated by the American Film Institute in AFI's 100 Years... 100 Thrills.

== Legacy ==
This is one among many of a class of disaster films that became a popular craze during the 1970s. Its plot devices and characterizations, including a singing nun (Helen Reddy), a former glamorous star (Gloria Swanson as herself), an alcoholic (Myrna Loy), a child in need of an organ transplant (Linda Blair) and a chatterbox (Sid Caesar) were parodied on The Carol Burnett Show (as Disaster '75) and more notably in the film Airplane! (1980).

Airplane! creators Zucker, Abrahams and Zucker originally intended to cast Helen Reddy as a similar nun character in their film. However, facing a potential copyright infringement lawsuit from Universal Pictures, they cast Maureen McGovern instead and agreed to retitle the film Flying High for its international release.

== See also ==
- List of American films of 1974
