= Airplane! =

1980 American satirical comedy film

- Theatrical release poster by Robert Grossman
- Directed by: Jim Abrahams; David Zucker; Jerry Zucker
- Written by: Jim Abrahams; David Zucker; Jerry Zucker
- Based on: Zero Hour! by Arthur Hailey; Hall Bartlett; John Champion
- Produced by: Jon Davison
- Starring: Robert Hays; Julie Hagerty
- Cinematography: Joseph Biroc
- Edited by: Patrick Kennedy
- Music by: Elmer Bernstein
- Production companies: Paramount Pictures; Howard W. Koch Productions
- Distributed by: Paramount Pictures
- Release dates: June 27, 1980 (Toronto and Buffalo); July 2, 1980 (Wide)
- Running time: 87 minutes
- Country: United States
- Language: English
- Budget: $3.5 million
- Box office: $171 million

Airplane! (alternatively titled Flying High!) is a 1980 American comedy film written and directed by David Zucker, Jim Abrahams, and Jerry Zucker in their directorial debut, and produced by Jon Davison. It stars Robert Hays and Julie Hagerty and features Leslie Nielsen, Robert Stack, Lloyd Bridges, Peter Graves, Lorna Patterson, Stephen Stucker, and Kareem Abdul-Jabbar. It is a parody of the disaster film genre, particularly the 1957 Paramount film Zero Hour!, from which it borrows the plot, central characters, and some dialogue. It also draws many elements from Airport 1975 and other films in the Airport series. It is known for using surreal humor and fast-paced slapstick comedy, including visual and verbal puns, gags, running jokes, and satirical sharp overtones.

Released by Paramount Pictures, it was a critical and commercial success, grossing $171 million worldwide against a budget of $3.5 million. The creators received the Writers Guild of America Award for Best Adapted Comedy, and nominations for the Golden Globe Award for Best Motion Picture – Musical or Comedy and for the BAFTA Award for Best Screenplay.

Since its release, the film's reputation has grown substantially, and Airplane! is now considered one of the greatest comedy films ever made, inspiring numerous references, homages, and further parodies in popular culture. It ranked sixth on Bravo's 100 Funniest Movies. In a 2007 survey by Channel 4 in the United Kingdom, it was judged the second-greatest comedy of all time, behind Monty Python's Life of Brian. In 2008, it was selected by Empire magazine as one of the 500 Greatest Movies of All Time, and in 2012 was voted number one on the 50 Funniest Comedies Ever poll. In 2010, Airplane! was selected for preservation in the United States National Film Registry by the Library of Congress as being "culturally, historically, or aesthetically significant".

== Plot ==
Ex–fighter pilot Ted Striker is a traumatized war veteran turned taxi driver. Because of his pathological fear of flying and subsequent "drinking problem"—he splashes beverages anywhere but into his mouth—Ted has been unable to hold a responsible job. His wartime girlfriend, Elaine Dickinson, now a flight attendant, breaks off her relationship with him before boarding her rostered flight from Los Angeles to Chicago. Ted, having gotten home early enough to see her break-up note and catch her at the airport, abandons his taxi to buy a ticket on the same flight to try to win her back.

Once on board, however, Elaine continues to reject him. Ted tells the story of how they met to several other passengers, inadvertently driving them to suicide due to boredom as he windily reminisces. The pilots, including co-pilot Kareem Abdul-Jabbar (under the alias Roger Murdock), entertain a child in the cockpit.

After the in-flight meal is served (a choice of either steak or fish), the entire flight crew and several passengers fall ill. Passenger Dr. Rumack discovers that the fish served during meal service has caused food poisoning. With the flight crew incapacitated, Elaine contacts the Chicago control tower for help and is instructed by tower supervisor Steve McCroskey to activate the plane's autopilot, a large inflatable dummy pilot dubbed "Otto", which will get them to Chicago, but cannot land the plane. Elaine reinflates the inflatable dummy and sits next to it while ATC gives instructions.

Elaine and Rumack convince Ted to take the controls. When Steve learns Ted is piloting, he contacts Ted's former commanding officer, Rex Kramer. A young intern drives to Kramer's house to pick him up in the middle of the night and is mauled by his dog. Kramer, now serving as a commercial pilot, arrives and helps talk Ted through the landing procedure. Ted becomes uneasy when Kramer starts giving orders, and he briefly breaks down amid more wartime flashbacks. Elaine and Rumack both bolster Ted's confidence, and he manages to once again take the controls. ATC's efforts are hampered by nosy journalists printing sensationalist stories about the flight and its chances of crashing.

As the plane nears Chicago, the weather worsens, complicating the landing. Passengers are asked to take brace position for landing. With Elaine's help as co-pilot and Rex's guidance from the tower, Ted is able to land the plane safely, despite the landing gear shearing off, and the passengers suffer only minor injuries. Rescue vehicles arrive to help unload the plane. Impressed by Ted's courage, Elaine embraces and kisses him, rekindling their relationship. "Otto" restarts the plane and takes off as a female companion inflates beside him.

== Cast ==
- Robert Hays as Ted Striker
- Julie Hagerty as Elaine Dickinson
- Kareem Abdul-Jabbar as First Officer Roger Murdock
- Lloyd Bridges as Steve McCroskey
- Peter Graves as Captain Clarence Oveur
- Leslie Nielsen as Dr. Rumack
- Lorna Patterson as Randy
- Robert Stack as Captain Rex Kramer
- Stephen Stucker as Air Traffic Controller Johnny Henshaw-Jacobs
- Frank Ashmore as Flight Engineer Victor Basta
- Jonathan Banks as Gunderson
- Craig Berenson as Paul Carey
- Barbara Billingsley as Jive Lady
- Lee Bryant as Mrs. Hammen
- Nicholas Pryor as Jim Hammen
- Joyce Bulifant as Mrs. Davis
- Maureen McGovern as Nun
- Howard Honig as Jack
- Kenneth Tobey as Air Controller Neubauer
- Marcy Goldman as Mrs. Geline
- Barbara Stuart as Mrs. Kramer
- Ross Harris as Joey Hammen
- Norman Alexander Gibbs as First Jive Dude
- Al White as Second Jive Dude
- David Hollander as Young Boy with Coffee
- Michelle Stacy as Young Girl with Coffee
- David Leisure as First Krishna
- Jason Wingreen as Dr. Brody
- Jill Whelan as Lisa Davis
- Ethel Merman as Lieutenant Hurwitz
- Lee Terri as Mrs. Linda Oveur
- Jimmie Walker as Windshield Wiper Man
- James Hong as Japanese General
- Howard Jarvis as Man in Taxi
- Michael Laurence as Newscaster
- Herb Voland as Air Controller Macias
- Otto as Himself

== Production ==
=== Development and writing ===
Jerry Zucker, Jim Abrahams, and David Zucker (collectively known as Zucker, Abrahams and Zucker, or ZAZ) wrote Airplane! while they were performing with the Kentucky Fried Theatre, a theatre group they had founded in 1971. To obtain material for comedy routines, they routinely recorded late-night television and reviewed the tapes later primarily to pull the commercials, a process Abrahams compared to "seining for fish". During one such taping process, they unintentionally recorded the 1957 film Zero Hour!, and while scanning the commercials, found it to be a "perfectly classically structured film" according to Jerry Zucker. Abrahams later described Zero Hour! as "the serious version of Airplane!" It was the first film script they wrote, completed around 1975, and was originally called The Late Show. The script originally stayed close to the dialog and plot of Zero Hour!, as ZAZ thought they did not have a sufficient understanding of film at the time to structure a proper script. ZAZ's script borrowed so much from Zero Hour! that they believed they needed to negotiate the rights to create the remake of the film and ensure they remain within the allowance for parody within copyright law. They were able to obtain the rights from Warner Bros. and Paramount for about $2,500 at the time. The original script contained spoofs of television commercials, but people who proofread it advised them to shorten the commercials, and they eventually removed them. When their script was finished, they were unable to sell it.

While failing to sell their script, the trio met director John Landis, who encouraged them to write a film based on their theatre sketches. They managed to put The Kentucky Fried Movie into production in the late 1970s. David Zucker said, "it was the first time we had ever been on a movie set. We learned a lot. We learned that if you really wanted a movie to come out the way you wanted it to, you had to direct. So on the next movie, Airplane!, we insisted on directing". Joe Dante was offered to direct, but he declined for undisclosed reasons.

Eventually the Airplane! script found its way to Paramount through Michael Eisner, who had learned of the script via Susan Baerwald, another scriptwriter with United Artists, and had Jeffrey Katzenberg track down and meet with ZAZ to discuss details. Avco Embassy Pictures also expressed interest in producing the film, but ZAZ decided to go with Paramount.

Paramount insisted the film be shot in color rather than black-and-white as ZAZ wanted, and to be set aboard a jet airliner rather than propeller plane to better identify with modern filmgoers. In exchange, Paramount acquiesced to ZAZ's desire to cast serious actors for the film rather than comedy performers.

During pre-production, Universal Pictures filed a complaint against Paramount, claiming that Airplane!'s parody of the Airport film series and the similarity of their titles constituted plagiarism. After a review by the Motion Picture Association of America (MPAA) arbitration board, Paramount agreed to retitle the film Flying High! for its international release. ZAZ also agreed not to cast their first choice Helen Reddy as the singing nun (which parodied a similar role in Airport 1975), with the understanding that Reddy playing a similar character in both films might constitute plagiarism.

=== Casting ===
David Zucker explained that "the trick was to cast actors like Robert Stack, Leslie Nielsen, Peter Graves, and Lloyd Bridges. These were people who, up to that time, had never done comedy. We thought they were much funnier than the comedians of that time were".

David Zucker felt Stack was the most important actor to be cast, since he was the "linchpin" of the film's plot. Stack initially played his role in a way that was different from what the directors had in mind. They showed him a tape of impressionist John Byner impersonating Robert Stack. According to the producers, Stack was "doing an impression of John Byner doing an impression of Stack". Stack was not initially interested in the part, but ZAZ persuaded him. Bridges' children advised him to take the part. Graves rejected the script at first, considering it tasteless. During filming, ZAZ had explained to Graves that his lines spoken to a young boy, such as "Have you ever seen a grown man naked?", would "be explained later in a part that you aren't in". On the DVD commentary, Abrahams said: "I don't understand. What did he think was tasteless about pedophilia?"

For the role of Dr. Rumack, ZAZ initially suggested Dom DeLuise, Christopher Lee (who had appeared in Airport '77), Vincent Price, and Jack Webb, all of whom turned it down, before they considered Nielsen, who was "just a fish in water" in his role, according to Jerry Zucker. Nielsen's career to this point had consisted mostly of serious leading roles, but he had wanted to work in comedy and had been looking for a film to help in the transition. He was considered a "closet comedian" on set, pranking his fellow actors between shots, but immediately adopted his somber, serious persona when performing as Rumack. During filming, Nielsen used a device that made farting noises to keep the cast off-balance. Hays said that Nielsen "played that thing like a maestro". Christopher Lee would later acknowledge that turning down the role (to star in the film 1941) was a huge mistake.

The role of Ted Striker was written for David Letterman, who had auditioned for a news anchorman role in Kentucky Fried Movie. Letterman did a screen test in 1979 that ZAZ liked and they wanted him to do a second audition, but Letterman did not want to pursue the role and was not selected. Chevy Chase, Barry Manilow, Bill Murray and Fred Willard were also considered for the role. Caitlyn Jenner (Note: At the time of production, Caitlyn was still presenting as male and known as Bruce Jenner.) also read for the part. Instead, ZAZ opted for Robert Hays, co-star of ABC's situation comedy Angie. Elaine's part was auditioned for by Sigourney Weaver and Shelley Long but eventually went to Julie Hagerty, in her film debut. The directors advised the pair to play their roles straight. Hays and Hagerty developed an on-screen chemistry that worked in the film's favor; they spent time to practice and perfect the bar dance routine set to "Stayin' Alive", among other scenes.

For the "red zone/white zone" send-up of curbside terminal announcements in which public address announcers "Betty" and "Vernon" argue over the red and white zones, ZAZ went through the usual process of auditioning professional voice actors, but failed to find ones who could provide the desired authenticity. Instead, the filmmakers ultimately sought out and hired the real-life married couple who had recorded the announcement tapes which were then being used at Los Angeles International Airport. ZAZ lifted some of their dialog directly from the 1968 novel Airport, written by Arthur Hailey who had also written Zero Hour!'s script. The lifted lines included ones about an unwanted pregnancy; David Zucker said the couple "got a kick out of it". The role of the Hare Krishna in the airport went to a college roommate of Hays's, newcomer David Leisure, due to Leisure's willingness to shave his head for the bit part; it would be several more years before Leisure landed his breakthrough role as Joe Isuzu. Baseball player Pete Rose was originally considered for the role of Roger Murdock. Singer Maureen McGovern, who had previously sung the theme songs of the disaster films The Poseidon Adventure (1972) and The Towering Inferno (1974), made her credited acting debut as the singing nun. Ethel Merman had her final on-screen role as Lt. Hurwitz, a shellshocked soldier who believes he is Ethel Merman.

ZAZ got businessman and Republican politician Howard Jarvis to make a cameo appearance. Jarvis, who was well known in California at the time for getting his tax policy Proposition 13 passed in 1978, plays the patient passenger who gets into Ted Striker's cab at the start of the film. He then spends the entire movie sitting in an empty cab with the meter running. He also has the final line, which he says after the end credits: he looks at his watch and says "Well, I'll give him another twenty minutes, but that's it!", the joke being that Jarvis was wasting money while being known for his stance on fiscal responsibility and limited spending.

=== Filming ===
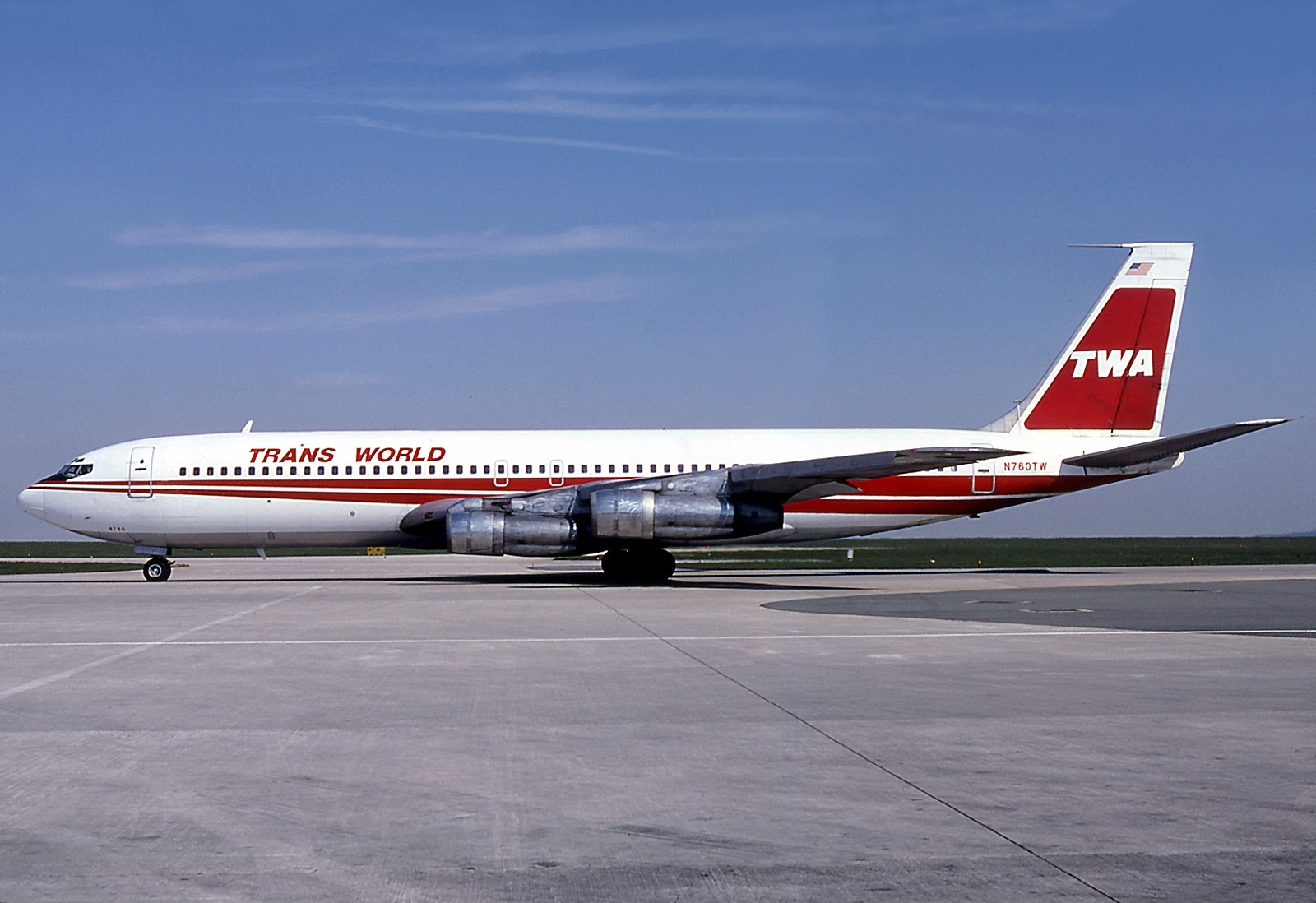
A Boeing 707 from Trans World Airlines was used to depict the aircraft in the film.

Principal photography began on June 20, 1979, and wrapped on August 31, with the bulk of filming having been done in August. Shooting took place mainly at the Culver City Studios, along with location shooting at Los Angeles International Airport. The aircraft for the fictional Trans American Airlines was based on a Boeing 707 with Trans World Airlines (TWA) livery. An actual TWA 707 and a scale model were used to depict the aircraft in the film; the final shot of the film, featuring the plane taking off, used footage of a Boeing 727. The director of photography was Joseph F. Biroc, who had previously shot the disaster films The Towering Inferno (earning an Academy Award) and Beyond the Poseidon Adventure. Jerry Zucker stood beside the camera during shooting, while David Zucker and Jim Abrahams watched the video feed to see how the film would look; they conferred after each take.

ZAZ originally asked to be credited under the shared pseudonym "Abrahams N. Zuckers", but this was denied by the Directors Guild of America. Conversely, the Guild had a rule that a film could not be helmed by three directors, and for a time Jerry Zucker was considered to be credited as sole director. Eventually, the trio obtained a waiver from the Guild's executive board to be jointly credited as director.

=== Music ===
The film's score was composed and conducted by Elmer Bernstein, who had provided soundtracks for classic films including The Ten Commandments, The Magnificent Seven, To Kill a Mockingbird, and The Great Escape, and performed by the Hollywood Studio Symphony. ZAZ told Bernstein they did not want an epic score like his past works but "a B-Movie level score, overdone and corny". According to ZAZ, Bernstein completely understood what they were trying to do, had laughed throughout a previous cut of the film, and wrote a "fantastic score".

In 1980, an LP soundtrack for the film was released by Regency Records, which includes dialog and songs from the film. Narrated by Shadoe Stevens, it features only one score track, the "Love Theme from Airplane!" composed by Bernstein. The soundtrack was altered for the European Flying High release, with several featured tracks swapped for pieces original to the LP.

In April 2009, La-La Land Records announced it would release the first official soundtrack album for Airplane!, containing Bernstein's complete score. The soundtrack was released digitally on February 19, 2013, by Paramount Music.

=== Post-production ===
ZAZ test screened the film in front of college campuses. Based on audience feedback, they reduced the runtime from 115 minutes to 87 minutes. Among the cut scenes was one featuring José Feliciano as a blind "Air Poland" pilot, which ZAZ later claimed was unfunny.

== Release ==
Prior to the film's release, the directors were apprehensive following a mediocre audience response at a pre-screening, but the film earned its entire budget of about $3.5 million in its first five days of wide release.

Airplane! opened on June 27, 1980, in seven theatres in Toronto, Canada, grossing $83,058 in its opening weekend. It also opened in two theaters in Buffalo, New York, grossing $14,000 in its first week. The film then expanded on Wednesday, July 2, to 705 theaters in the United States and Canada, grossing $6,052,514 in its first five days of wide release, finishing second for the weekend with a gross of $4,540,000. Overall, it grossed $83 million at the US and Canadian box office and returned $40 million in rentals, making it the fourth-highest-grossing film of 1980. Worldwide, the film earned $130 million in its initial release, and by 2002 it had made $171 million.

== Reception ==
"Airplane! emerged in 1980 as a sharply perceptive parody of the big-budget disaster films that dominated Hollywood during the 1970s [and] introduced a much-needed deflating assessment of the tendency of theatrical film producers to push successful formulaic movie conventions beyond the point of logic".

— Library of Congress

Airplane! received universal acclaim from critics and is widely regarded as one of the best films of 1980. On the review aggregator website Rotten Tomatoes, 97% of 73 critics' reviews are positive, with an average rating of 8.5/10. The website's consensus reads: "Though unabashedly juvenile and silly, Airplane! is nevertheless an uproarious spoof comedy full of quotable lines and slapstick gags that endure to this day." Metacritic, which uses a weighted average, assigned the film a score of 78 out of 100, based on 18 critics, indicating "generally favorable" reviews.

Roger Ebert of the Chicago Sun-Times wrote "Airplane! is sophomoric, obvious, predictable, corny, and quite often very funny. And the reason it's funny is frequently because it's sophomoric, predictable, corny, etc." Janet Maslin of The New York Times wrote "Airplane! is more than a pleasant surprise... As a remedy for the bloated self-importance of too many other current efforts, it's just what the doctor ordered".

In 2008, Airplane! was selected by Empire magazine as one of 'The 500 Greatest Movies of All Time'. It was also placed on a similar list—'The Best 1000 Movies Ever Made'—by The New York Times. In November 2015, the film was ranked fourth in the Writers Guild of America's list of '101 Funniest Screenplays'.

MaximOnline.com named the airplane crash in Airplane! as number four on its list of "Most Horrific Movie Plane Crashes". Leslie Nielsen's response to Hays' "Surely you can't be serious" line—"I am serious. And don't call me Shirley"—was 79th on AFI's list of the best 100 movie quotes. In 2000, the American Film Institute listed Airplane! as number ten on its list of the 100 funniest American films. In the same year, Total Film readers voted it the second-greatest comedy film of all time. It was also second in the British 50 Greatest Comedy Films poll on Channel 4, beaten by Monty Python's Life of Brian. Entertainment Weekly voted the film the "funniest movie on video" in their list of the 100 funniest movies on video.

A number of actors were cast to spoof their established images: prior to their roles in Airplane!, Nielsen, Stack, and Bridges were known for portraying adventurous, no-nonsense tough-guy characters. Stack's role as the captain who loses his nerve in one of the earliest airline "disaster" films, The High and the Mighty (1954), is spoofed in Airplane!, as is Lloyd Bridges' 1970–1971 television role as airport manager Jim Conrad in San Francisco International Airport. Peter Graves was in the made-for-television film SST: Death Flight, in which an SST was unable to land owing to an emergency.

Nielsen's career after Airplane! was marked by similar deadpan comedy in the three Naked Gun films: The Naked Gun: From the Files of Police Squad! (1988); The Naked Gun 2 1/2: The Smell of Fear (1991); and Naked Gun 33 1/3: The Final Insult (1994). The films were based on the six-episode television series Police Squad! which starred Nielsen and was created and produced by Zucker–Abrahams–Zucker. This also led to his casting, many years later, in Mel Brooks' Dracula: Dead and Loving It. Brooks had wanted to make the film for a long time, but put it off because, as he said: "I just could not find the right Dracula". According to Brooks, he did not see Airplane! until years after its release. When he did, he knew Nielsen would be right for the part. When it was suggested that his role in Airplane! was against type, Nielsen protested that he had "always been cast against type before", and that comedy was what he always really wanted to do.

== Influence ==
Peter Farrelly said of the film: "I was in Rhode Island the first time I saw Airplane! Seeing it for the first time was like going to a great rock concert, like seeing Led Zeppelin or the Talking Heads. We didn't realize until later that what we'd seen was a very specific kind of comedy that we now call the Zucker-Abrahams-Zucker school". Farrelly, along with his writing partner Bennett Yellin, sent a comedy script to David Zucker, who in return gave them their first Hollywood writing job. Farrelly said: "I'll tell you right now, if the Zuckers didn't exist, there would be no Farrelly brothers".

On the Family Guy episode "Prick Up Your Ears", Stewie is told to calm down by a line of characters holding various weapons, mimicking a scene from the movie. In the episode "Airport '07", Hugh Hefner gives Quagmire a motivation speech while playing the Notre Dame Victory March, another reference.

During the Qantas Flight 72 incident over the Indian Ocean west of Australia in 2008, the captain recited some of Lloyd Bridges' lines to relieve tension while trying to land the plane. This was commented in the Air Disasters episode "Free Fall".

The 2010 documentary Jews and Baseball: An American Love Story opens with a scene from the film, in which a passenger is offered the very short book Famous Jewish Sports Legends by a flight attendant.

The MythBusters TV show episode "Airplane Hour" reenacted the climax of the film to see if an inexperienced pilot could land a plane with only a call from Air Traffic Control. The Mythbusters had to use a simulation to test the myth but concluded that the scene was plausible. They did, however, mention that most planes today have an autopilot to land the plane safely.

In the 2012 film Ted, main character John Bennett tells the story of how he met Lori Collins. The flashback is a close recreation of the scene where Ted Striker met Elaine Dickinson in the disco.

In early 2014, Delta Air Lines began using a new on-board safety film with many 1980s references, featuring an ending with a cameo of Kareem Abdul-Jabbar reprising his role as co-pilot Roger Murdock.

In 2014, Travel Wisconsin began airing an ad with Robert Hays and Kareem Abdul-Jabbar reprising their roles from the film. Kareem makes the comment "Why did I ever leave this place?" referring to his time playing for the Milwaukee Bucks. Hays also reprises his role as an airline pilot in Sharknado 2: The Second One.

The first episode of the eighth season of the TV series The Goldbergs re-enacts certain scenes.

== Related works ==
=== Sequel ===
Airplane II: The Sequel, first released on December 10, 1982, attempted to tackle the science fiction film genre, though there was still emphasis on the general theme of disaster films. Although most of the cast reunited for the sequel, the writers and directors of Airplane! chose not to be involved. In the DVD commentary for Airplane!, David Zucker, Jim Abrahams, and Jerry Zucker claim to have never seen nor to have any desire to see Airplane II.

=== Book and audiobook ===
An oral history on the making of Airplane! was published on October 3, 2023. An audiobook version was also released, featuring David Zucker, Jim Abrahams, and Jerry Zucker. Robert Hays and Julie Hagerty led the surviving cast members providing commentary, along with special guests Jimmy Kimmel, Bill Hader, "Weird Al" Yankovic, Molly Shannon, Sarah Silverman, Patton Oswalt, Beau Bridges, John Landis, Barry Diller and Michael Eisner, among others.
