= Airport '77 =

1977 disaster film directed by Jerry Jameson

- Theatrical release poster
- Directed by: Jerry Jameson
- Screenplay by: Michael Scheff; David Spector
- Story by: H. A. L. Craig; Charles Kuenstle
- Based on: Characters by Arthur Hailey
- Produced by: William Frye
- Starring: Jack Lemmon; Lee Grant; Brenda Vaccaro; Joseph Cotten; Olivia de Havilland; Darren McGavin; Christopher Lee; George Kennedy; James Stewart
- Cinematography: Philip H. Lathrop
- Edited by: Robert Watts; J. Terry Williams
- Music by: John Cacavas
- Production company: Universal Pictures
- Distributed by: Universal Pictures
- Release date: March 11, 1977
- Running time: 113 minutes
- Country: United States
- Language: English
- Budget: $6 million
- Box office: $91.1 million

Airport '77 is a 1977 American disaster film, and the third installment of the Airport film series. It is directed by Jerry Jameson, produced by William Frye, from a screenplay by Michael Scheff and David Spector and a story by H. A. L. Craig and Charles Kuenstle. The film's ensemble cast features Jack Lemmon, James Stewart, Joseph Cotten, Olivia de Havilland, Brenda Vaccaro, Darren McGavin, and Christopher Lee as well as the return of George Kennedy from the two previous Airport films.

The plot concerns a private Boeing 747 packed with VIPs and priceless art that is hijacked before crashing into the ocean in the Bermuda Triangle, forcing the survivors into a desperate struggle for survival.

Despite mixed critical reviews, Airport '77 was a box-office hit, grossing $91.1 million worldwide. At the 50th Academy Awards, the film received nominations for Best Art Direction and Best Costume Design.

== Plot ==
A privately owned Boeing 747 belonging to wealthy philanthropist Philip Stevens is flying to his Palm Beach, Florida estate. His estranged adult daughter Lisa and her young son Benjy are among the passengers. She is unaware Stevens is dying and wishes to reconnect with him. Also on board is priceless artwork from Stevens' private collection destined for his new museum. The collection has motivated a group of thieves led by co-pilot Bob Chambers to hijack the aircraft.

Captain Don Gallagher is lured from the cockpit during the flight and knocked unconscious. Sleeping gas secretly installed pre-flight renders unprotected crew and passengers in the cabin unconscious. Chambers pilots the aircraft to a small deserted island to offload the art treasures, dropping the plane below radar range to seemingly disappear to flight controllers in the Bermuda Triangle. Descending almost to wave-top altitude, one of the plane's wings collides with an offshore drilling platform in a fog bank. Chambers extinguishes the resulting engine fire, but the plane stalls and crashes and sinks quickly. The plane settles in relatively shallow water above the plane's crush depth, though water pressure gradually compromises the fuselage and a persistent air leak makes a timely rescue imperative. Many passengers are injured, some seriously. Chambers, the only surviving hijacker, reveals the plane was 200 miles (320 km) off course, meaning search and rescue efforts will be focused in the wrong area and the trapped crew must get a signal buoy to the surface. Captain Gallagher and a professional diver, Martin Wallace, attempt to swim to the surface using air masks. A malfunctioning hatch kills Wallace but Gallagher succeeds in activating the emergency beacon on the surface. The signal is detected and a rescue operation is launched, joined by veteran aeronautics expert Joe Patroni and Philip Stevens.

The Navy dispatches a flotilla including sub-recovery ship USS Cayuga and USS Agerholm. Gallagher is rescued. Stevens, aboard Cayuga, is warned by Patroni on the mainland of the aircraft's risk of imploding. Navy divers raise the aircraft with balloons, but just before the plane reaches the surface, a balloon breaks loose and a cargo door bursts, flooding the cabin with seawater, killing Chambers, Wallace's widow Karen, and an injured passenger. Additional air pressure lifts the plane to the surface, and all survivors are evacuated. Captain Gallagher and Stevens' assistant, Eve, are fished from the ocean by a Navy helicopter as the 747 sinks beneath the waves. Stevens reunites with Lisa and Benjy, while the helicopter carrying Gallagher and Eve lands aboard Agerholm, where they are met by the grateful survivors.

== Cast ==
- Jack Lemmon as Capt. Don Gallagher
- Lee Grant as Karen Wallace
- Brenda Vaccaro as Eve Clayton
- Joseph Cotten as Nicholas St. Downs III
- Olivia de Havilland as Emily Livingston
- James Stewart as Philip Stevens
- George Kennedy as Joseph "Joe" Patroni
- Darren McGavin as Stan Buchek
- Christopher Lee as Martin Wallace
- Robert Foxworth as Bob Chambers
- Robert Hooks as Eddie
- Monte Markham as Banker
- Kathleen Quinlan as Julie
- Gil Gerard as Frank Powers
- James Booth as Ralph Crawford
- Monica Lewis as Anne
- Maidie Norman as Dorothy
- Pamela Bellwood as Lisa Stevens
- Arlene Golonka as Mrs. Jane Stern
- Tom Sullivan as Steve
- M. Emmet Walsh as Dr. Harvard Williams
- Michael Pataki as Wilson
- George Furth as Gerald Lucas
- Richard Venture as Commander Guay
- Elizabeth Cheshire as Bonnie Stern
- Peter Fox as Lieutenant Tommy Norris
- Anthony Battaglia as Benjy Stevens

== Production ==
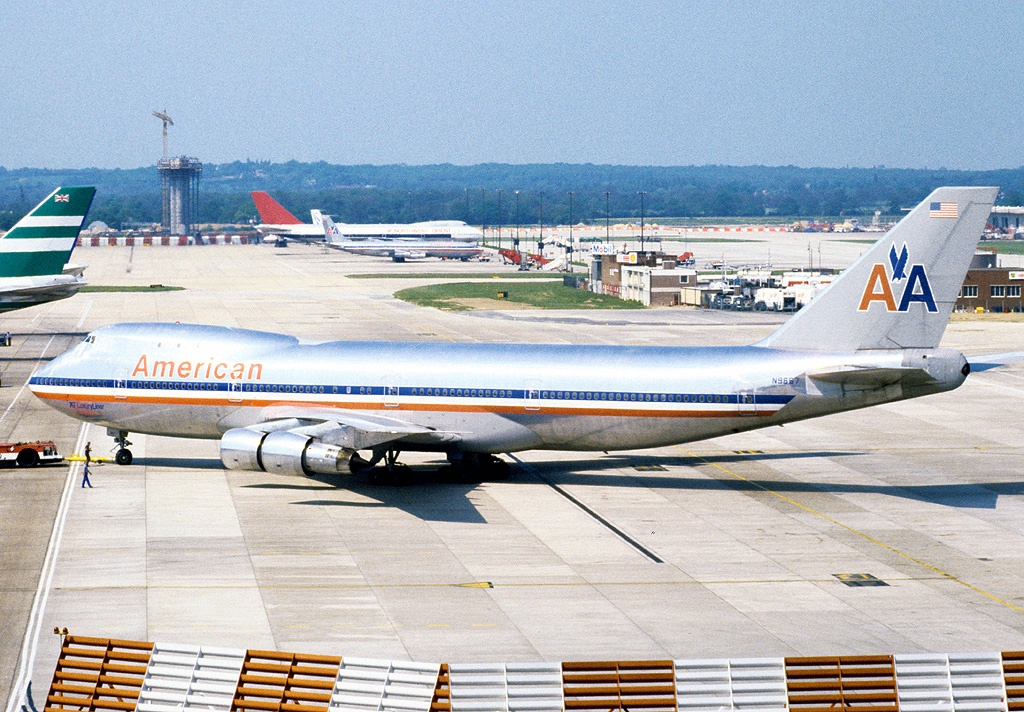
The aircraft used for the film, N9667

Although the disaster portrayed in the film is fictional, rescue operations depicted in the movie are actual rescue operations used by the Navy in the event of similar emergencies or disasters, as indicated at the end of the film prior to the closing credits. The disaster itself—a hard water landing as shown in the film, and an intact sinking—would not be likely given the hard tailstrike, which would have demolished the aircraft.

For the interior of the submerging Boeing 747, production designer George C. Webb designed a three-storey, 4000-square foot interior mounted on gimbals. A 72-foot portion of the 747's exterior was submerged in a Florida lake for the underwater shots.

Edith Head was the film's co-costume designer, receiving her 35th and final Academy Award nomination for Best Costume Design.

== Reception ==
=== Box office ===
The film grossed $30 million in the United States and Canada and $61 million internationally for a worldwide total of $91.1 million.

=== Critical reception ===
Rotten Tomatoes, a review aggregator, reports that 50% of 12 surveyed critics gave the film a positive review; the average rating is 5.4/10. On Metacritic the film has a weighted average score of 36 out of 100, based on 7 critics, indicating "generally unfavorable" reviews. Variety wrote, "The story's formula banality is credible most of the time and there's some good actual US Navy search and rescue procedure interjected in the plot." Roger Ebert of the Chicago Sun-Times rated it 2/4 stars and wrote, "The movie's a big, slick entertainment, relentlessly ridiculous and therefore never boring for long." The New York Times wrote, "Airport '77 looks less like the work of a director and writers than like a corporate decision."

=== Awards and nominations ===
Ceremony	Category	Recipient	Result
50th Academy Awards	Best Art Direction	George C. Webb, Mickey S. Michaels	Nominated
50th Academy Awards	Best Costume Design	Edith Head, Burton Miller	Nominated

== Television version ==
For its initial broadcast on NBC-TV in September 1978, an additional 70 minutes of outtakes and new footage shot especially for network TV was added.

== Theme park attraction ==
From late 1977 until the early 1980s, the Universal Studios Tour in California featured the Airport '77 Screen Test Theater as part of the tour. Several sets were recreated, and members of the audience were chosen to play various parts. The audience would watch as these scenes were filmed. Key scenes such as the hijacking, crash and rescue were recreated, and the footage was then incorporated into a brief digest version of the film and screened for the audience on monitors. Each show's mini-film was made available for audience members to purchase on 8 mm film and videotape.
