= The Hurricane =

The Hurricane may refer to:

A hurricane, a type of severe storm; see: Tropical cyclone

- The Hurricane (novel), a bestselling 1936 book by Charles Nordhoff and James Norman Hall
- The Hurricane (1937 film), a 1937 John Ford film based on the novel
- The Hurricane (1999 film), a 1999 film about Carter, starring Denzel Washington
- Rubin Carter (1937–2014), a boxer nicknamed "The Hurricane"
- Gregory Helms (born 1974), a professional wrestler, previously known as "The Hurricane"
