= Special Achievement Academy Award =

Academy Award

The Special Achievement Award is an Academy Award given for an achievement that makes an exceptional contribution to the motion picture for which it was created, but for which there is no annual award category. Many of the film projects that received these awards were noted for breaking new ground in terms of technology, where an awards category simply did not yet exist for the given area. New awards categories were often opened in following years. For example, Toy Story was awarded a special achievement award as the first computer-animated feature film in 1996, before the Best Animated Feature Film category debuted in 2001 in which Shrek won the inaugural award.

The award may only be conferred for achievements in productions that also qualify as an eligible release for distinguished achievements and meet the Academy's eligibility year and deadlines requirements. Special Achievement Awards were primarily given between the 1970s and 1990s, with only a single award being given since 2000.

== Recipients ==
This table displays the individuals who received the Special Achievement Oscar for their contributions to film. The category was inaugurated in 1972.

| Year | Recipient(s) | Achievement | Film |
|---|---|---|---|
| 1972 (45th) | L. B. Abbott; A. D. Flowers | Visual effects | The Poseidon Adventure |
| 1974 (47th) | Frank Brendel; Glen Robinson; Albert Whitlock | Visual effects | Earthquake |
| 1975 (48th) | Peter Berkos | Sound effects | The Hindenburg |
| 1975 (48th) | Albert Whitlock; Glen Robinson | Visual effects | The Hindenburg |
| 1976 (49th) | Carlo Rambaldi; Glen Robinson; Frank Van der Veer | Visual effects | King Kong |
| 1976 (49th) | L. B. Abbott; Glen Robinson; Matthew Yuricich | Visual effects | Logan's Run |
| 1977 (50th) | Ben Burtt | Alien, creature and robot voices | Star Wars |
| 1977 (50th) | Frank Warner | Sound effects editing | Close Encounters of the Third Kind |
| 1978 (51st) | Les Bowie; Colin Chilvers; Denys Coop; Roy Field; Derek Meddings; Zoran Perisic | Visual effects | Superman |
| 1979 (52nd) | Alan Splet | Sound editing | The Black Stallion |
| 1980 (53rd) | Brian Johnson; Richard Edlund; Dennis Muren; Bruce Nicholson | Visual effects | The Empire Strikes Back |
| 1981 (54th) | Ben Burtt; Richard L. Anderson | Sound effects editing | Raiders of the Lost Ark |
| 1983 (56th) | Richard Edlund; Dennis Muren; Ken Ralston; Phil Tippett | Visual effects | Return of the Jedi |
| 1984 (57th) | Kay Rose | Sound effects editing | The River |
| 1987 (60th) | Stephen Hunter Flick; John Pospisil | Sound effects editing | RoboCop |
| 1988 (61st) | Richard Williams | Animation direction | Who Framed Roger Rabbit |
| 1990 (63rd) | Eric Brevig; Rob Bottin; Tim McGovern; Alex Funke | Visual effects | Total Recall |
| 1995 (68th) | John Lasseter | First feature-length computer-animated film | Toy Story |
| 2017 (90th) | Alejandro G. Iñárritu | A virtual reality installation; "in recognition of a visionary and powerful experience in storytelling." | Carne y arena |
