= King Kong (1976 film) =

1976 film by John Guillermin

- Theatrical release poster by John Berkey
- Directed by: John Guillermin
- Screenplay by: Lorenzo Semple Jr.
- Based on: King Kong by: James Creelman; Ruth Rose; Merian C. Cooper; Edgar Wallace
- Produced by: Dino De Laurentiis
- Starring: Jeff Bridges; Charles Grodin; Jessica Lange
- Cinematography: Richard H. Kline
- Edited by: Ralph E. Winters
- Music by: John Barry
- Production company: Dino De Laurentiis Corporation
- Distributed by: Paramount Pictures
- Release date: December 17, 1976
- Running time: 134 minutes
- Countries: United States; Italy
- Language: English
- Budget: $23–24 million
- Box office: $90.6 million

King Kong is a 1976 American adventure monster film, directed by John Guillermin. It is a remake of the 1933 film about a giant ape who is captured and taken to New York City for exhibition. It stars Jeff Bridges, Charles Grodin, and Jessica Lange, and features mechanical effects by Carlo Rambaldi and makeup effects by Rick Baker, who also portrayed King Kong. It is the fifth entry in the King Kong franchise.

The idea to remake King Kong was conceived in 1974 by Michael Eisner, who was then an ABC executive. He separately proposed the idea to Universal Pictures CEO Sidney Sheinberg and Paramount Pictures CEO Barry Diller. Italian producer Dino De Laurentiis quickly acquired the film rights from RKO-General and subsequently hired television writer Lorenzo Semple Jr. to write the script. John Guillermin was hired as director and filming lasted from January to August 1976. Before the film's release, Universal Pictures sued De Laurentiis and RKO-General alleging breach of contract, and attempted to develop their own remake of King Kong. In response, De Laurentiis and RKO-General filed separate countersuits against Universal Pictures, all of which were withdrawn by January 1976.

The film was released on December 17, 1976, to mixed reviews from critics and solid success at the box office, grossing $91 million against a $23–24M budget. It won a noncompetitive Special Achievement Academy Award for Best Visual Effects, and it was also nominated for Best Cinematography and Best Sound. A sequel, King Kong Lives, was released in 1986.

== Plot ==
Frederick Wilson, an oil executive, leads an expedition using infrared imagery that reveals an undiscovered island permanently hidden by clouds. Wilson believes the island has a huge oil deposit. Jack Prescott, a primate paleontologist, sneaks onto the expedition's vessel and attempts to warn the team against traveling to the island, citing an ominous final message about "the roar of the greatest beast" from previous doomed explorers. Wilson orders Prescott locked up, assuming he is a spy for a rival corporation, but eventually hires him as the expedition's photographer. Prescott spots a raft that carries the beautiful Dwan, an aspiring actress who was aboard a director's yacht, which exploded. During the rest of the ship's voyage, Prescott and Dwan become attracted to each other.

On reaching the island, the team discovers a primitive tribe living within a gigantic wall built to protect them from a mysterious god known as Kong. The team finds a large oil deposit, but it is so low quality that it is unusable. Later, while Dwan is on the ship's raft, the natives kidnap her and take her back to the island, where they offer her as a sacrifice to Kong. The giant ape grabs Dwan from the altar and returns to the jungle.

Although an awesome and terrifying sight, Kong quickly becomes tamed by Dwan, whose rambling monologue calms and fascinates him. After falling into the mud while trying to escape, Kong takes Dwan to a waterfall to wash herself, and then uses great gusts of his breath to dry her. This ordeal leaves her exhausted and she falls asleep in Kong's hand. Meanwhile, Prescott and First Mate Carnahan lead a rescue mission to save Dwan, who awakens later that night after Kong leaves her alone in a tree.

The rescue party encounters Kong while crossing a log bridge over a ravine; Kong rolls the log, killing Carnahan and the rest of the sailors. Prescott and crewman Boan survive on opposite sides of the ravine. Kong takes Dwan to his lair followed by Prescott as Boan returns to the ship. That night, Prescott rescues Dwan while Kong battles a giant snake to protect her. Kong chases them back to the native village, only to fall into a pit trap and knocked unconscious with chloroform.

With no oil, Wilson decides to transport Kong to America as promotion for his company. When they finally reach New York City, he puts Kong on display in a Beauty and the Beast show, chained with a large crown on his head. When Kong sees a group of reporters crowding around Dwan, the ape thinks they are assaulting Dwan, breaks free of his bonds, and goes on a rampage throughout the city. In the commotion, Wilson is killed when Kong steps on him. Prescott and Dwan flee across the Queensboro Bridge to Manhattan while Kong pursues them. While Dwan hides in a bar, Prescott calls the military and asks them to capture Kong unharmed. Using his keen sense of smell, Kong discovers Dwan and snatches her from the bar. He begins to make his way to the World Trade Center, with Jack and the military in pursuit.

Kong climbs the South Tower. The military ignores Jack's plea and uses deadly force against Kong. After being attacked by Marines with flamethrowers while standing on the roof, Kong leaps across to the North Tower. There, he is shot hundreds of times by military helicopters while Dwan futilely tries to stop them. The fatally injured Kong falls from the roof to the plaza. As Dwan makes it to the ground, she watches as Kong dies from his injuries. A sea of photographers swarms the hysterical Dwan, keeping Jack from her. Traumatized, she stands still as she is photographed relentlessly by reporters while Kong lies dead in a pool of blood and broken concrete.

== Cast ==
- Jeff Bridges as Jack Prescott
- Charles Grodin as Fred S. Wilson
- Jessica Lange as Dwan
- René Auberjonois as Roy Bagley
- John Randolph as Captain Ross
- Ed Lauter as First Mate Carnahan
- Jack O'Halloran as Crewman Joe Perko
- Julius Harris as Crewman Boan
- Dennis Fimple as Crewman Sunfish
- Jorge Moreno as Crewman Garcia
- Mario Gallo as Crewman Timmons
- Ira S. Rosenstein as Crewman Logan
- Ray Buktenica as Bridge Officer
- David Roya as Ship's Radio Operator
- John Lone as Chinese Cook
- John Agar as City Official
- Sid Conrad as Petrox Chairman
- Keny Long as Ape-Masked Man
- Garry Walberg as Army General
- George Whiteman as Army Helicopter Pilot
- Wayne Heffley as Air Force Colonel
- Corbin Bernsen as Reporter #1 (uncredited)
- Joe Piscopo as Reporter #2 (uncredited)
- Walt Gorney as Subway Driver (uncredited)
- Rick Baker and William Shepard as King Kong (both suit performances, uncredited)
  - Peter Cullen as the voice of Kong (uncredited)

== Production ==
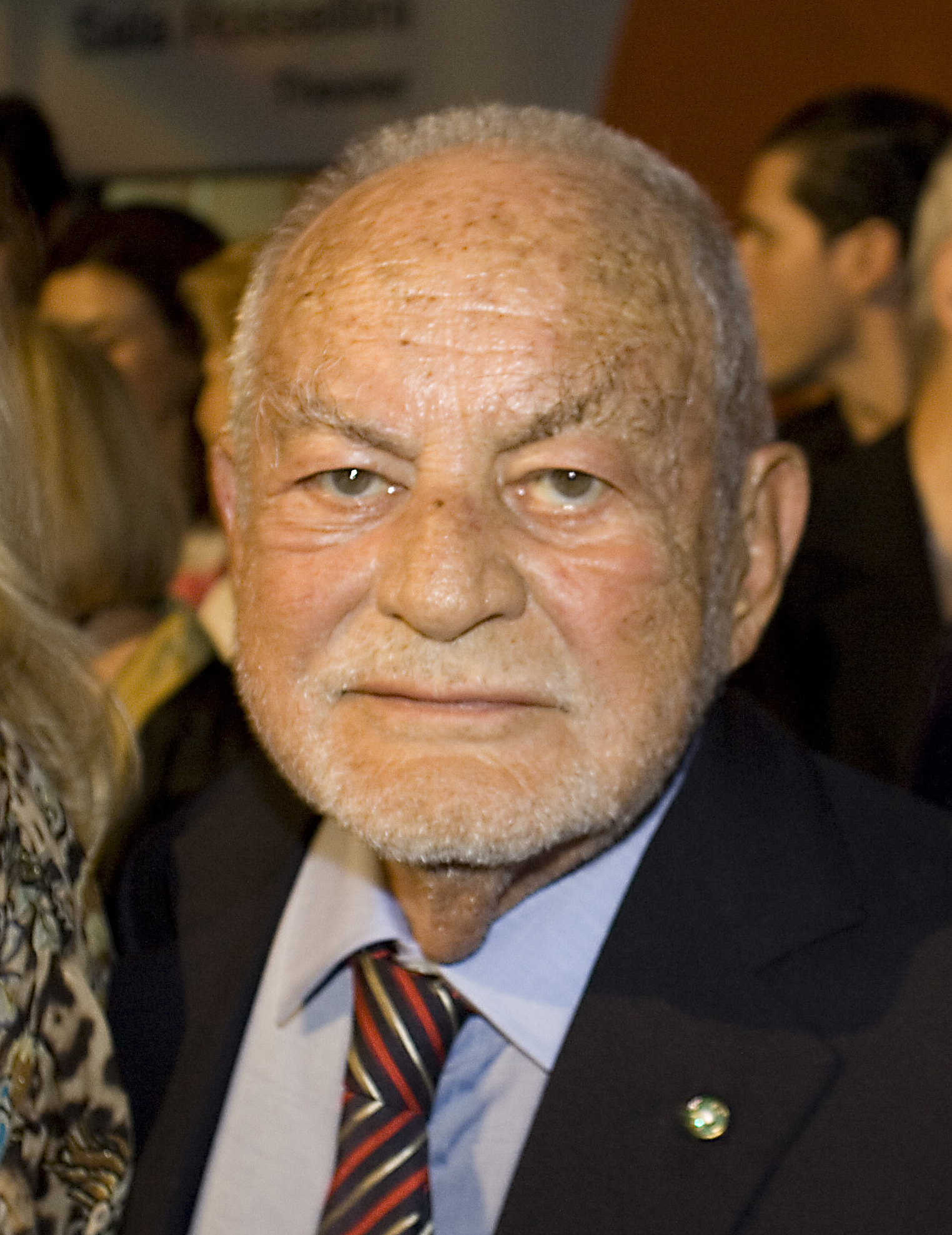
Producer Dino De Laurentiis

There are two different accounts of how the remake of King Kong came about. In December 1974, Michael Eisner, then an executive for ABC, watched the original film on television and struck on the idea for a remake. He pitched the idea to Barry Diller, the chairman and CEO of Paramount Pictures, who then enlisted veteran producer Dino De Laurentiis to work on the project. However, De Laurentiis claimed the idea to remake King Kong was solely his own when he saw a Kong poster in his daughter Francesca's bedroom as he woke her up every morning. When Diller suggested doing a monster film with him, De Laurentiis proposed the idea to remake King Kong. Diller and De Laurentiis provisionally agreed that Paramount would pay half of the film's proposed $12 million budget in return for the distribution rights in the United States and Canada if the former could purchase the film rights of the original film.

De Laurentiis later contacted his friend Thomas F. O'Neil, president of General Tire and RKO-General, who informed him that the film rights were indeed available. Later, De Laurentiis and company executive Frederic Sidewater entered formal negotiations with Daniel O'Shea, a semi-retired attorney for RKO-General, who requested a percentage of the film's gross. On May 6, 1975, De Laurentiis paid RKO-General $200,000 plus a percentage of the film's gross. After finalizing the agreement with Paramount, De Laurentiis and Sidewater began meeting with foreign distributors and set the film's release for Christmas 1976.

=== Writing ===
We made a very deliberate attempt not to be anything like the original movie in tone or mood. Dino wanted it to be light and amusing, rather than portentous. I don't think the original was meant to be mythic ... The original King Kong is extremely crude. I don't mean it's not wonderful. It was remarkable for its time, but it was a very small back-lot picture. We thought times had changed so much that audiences were more sophisticated. Dino felt we could have more fun with it. We hoped to do sensational things with advanced special effects on a big screen.

— Lorenzo Semple Jr. on writing King Kong

After moving his production company to Beverly Hills, De Laurentiis first met with screenwriter Lorenzo Semple Jr., who at the time was writing Three Days of the Condor. Impressed with his work on the film, De Laurentiis contacted Semple about writing King Kong, and Semple immediately signed on. During their collaboration on the project, De Laurentiis already had two ideas in mind: that the film would be set in the present-day, and the climax would be set on top of the newly constructed World Trade Center.

Because he felt audiences had grown more sophisticated since the original film, Semple sought to maintain a realistic tone, but infuse the script with a sly, ironic sense of humor that the audiences could laugh at. Having settled on the mood, Semple retained the basic plotline and set pieces from the original film, but updated and reworked other elements of the story. Inspired by the then-ongoing energy crisis and a suggestion from his friend Jerry Brick, Semple had the expedition mounted not by a filmmaker but by the Petrox Corporation, a giant petroleum conglomerate which suspects that Kong's island has unrefined oil reserves. In his original story outline, Petrox would discover Kong's island from a map hidden in the secret archives at the Vatican Library.

In a notable departure from the original film, Semple dropped the dinosaurs that are present with Kong on the island in order to devote increased attention to Kong and Dwan's love story, and to keep costs low: De Laurentiis did not want to use stop-motion animation in the film. Nevertheless, a giant boa constrictor was incorporated into the film.

A fast writer, Semple completed a forty-page outline within a few days and delivered it in August 1975. While De Laurentiis was pleased with Semple's outline, he expressed displeasure with the Vatican Library subplot, which was immediately dropped. It would later be replaced with Petrox discovering the island from classified photos taken by a United States spy satellite. Within a month, the 140-page first draft incorporated the character of Dwan (who according to the script was originally named Dawn until she switched the two middle letters to make it more memorable), the updated rendition of Ann Darrow from the 1933 film. For its second draft, the script was reduced to 110 pages. The final draft was completed by December 1975.

=== Casting ===
Meryl Streep has said that she was considered for the role of Dwan, but was deemed too unattractive by producer Dino De Laurentiis. Dwan was also proposed to Barbra Streisand but she turned it down. The role eventually went to the unknown Jessica Lange, then a New York fashion model with no prior acting experience.

=== Filming and special effects ===
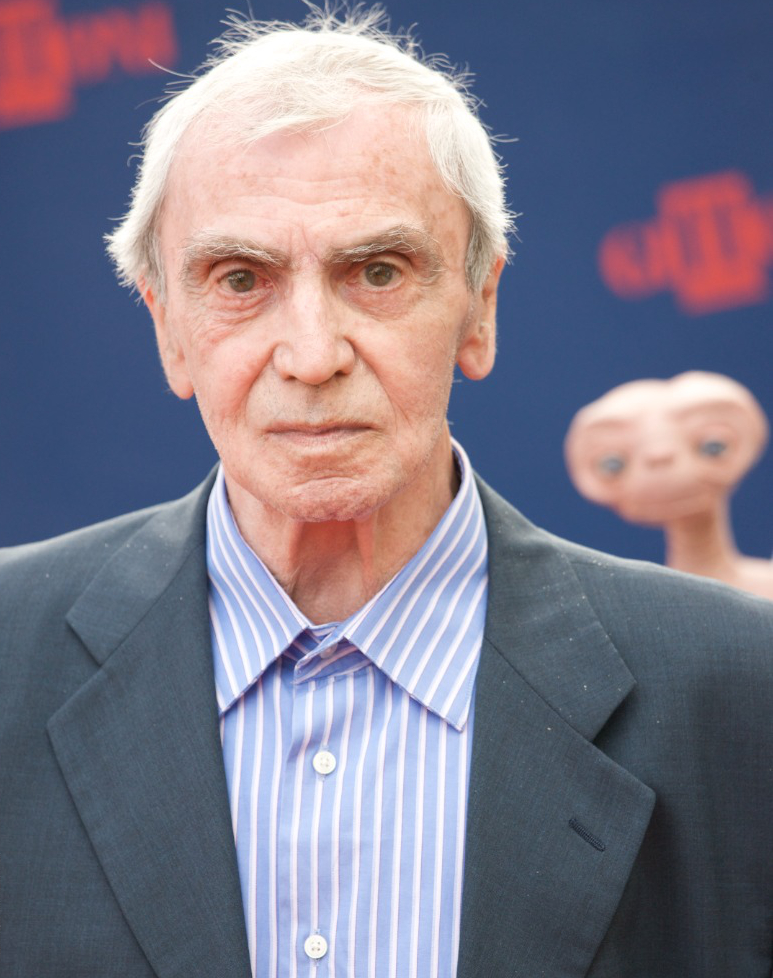
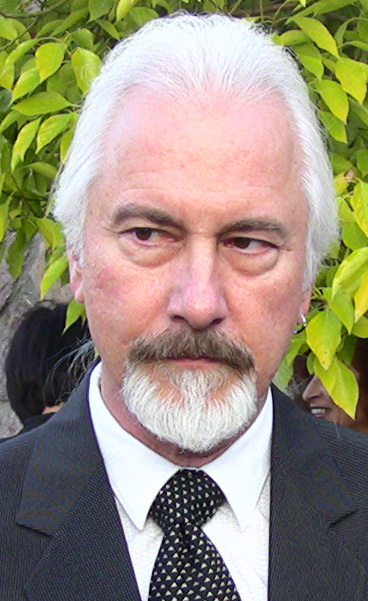
Carlo Rambaldi (left) and Rick Baker (right) were both instrumental in the creation of Kong. Rambaldi built full-sized mechanical arms and legs, while Baker co-created the suits with Rambaldi and also performed in them. A 40-foot (12 meters) animatronic Kong was also built, meant to be the centerpiece of the movie, but it was barely used due to technical issues.

De Laurentiis first approached Roman Polanski to direct the picture, but he wasn't interested. De Laurentiis's next choice was director John Guillermin, who had just finished directing The Towering Inferno (1974). Guillermin had been developing a version of The Hurricane when offered the job of King Kong.

Guillermin, who was known to have had outbursts from time to time on the set, got into a public shouting match with executive producer Federico De Laurentiis (son of producer Dino De Laurentiis). After the incident, De Laurentiis was reported to have threatened to fire Guillermin if he did not start treating the cast and crew better.

As part of the $16 million budget, De Laurentiis had his mind set on building a full-scale animatronic Kong. Italian special effect artist Carlo Rambaldi designed and built the mechanical Kong, which was 40 ft (12.2 m) tall and weighed 6 1/2 tons; he would later compare building it to "the United States space program" during the race to the moon. Glen Robinson oversaw the construction of Kong and the amalgam of aluminium, latex, horse tails and hydraulics. Rambaldi had also to devise separate mechanical hands with working fingers, which could be used to scoop up Jessica Lange in close-ups, and a man-sized ape suit for long shots. For the ape suit, Rambaldi collaborated with Rick Baker, who also wore it during the filming. According to Bahrenburg, five different masks were created by Rambaldi to convey various emotions. Separate masks were necessary, as there were too many cables and mechanics required for all the expressions to fit in one single mask. To complete the look of a gorilla, Baker wore contact lenses so his eyes would resemble those of a gorilla.

Rambaldi's giant mechanical Kong cost £500,000 to create. Despite months of preparation, the final device proved to be impossible to operate convincingly, and during the August 1976 filming of Kong's escape in New York, a hydraulic pipe inside the gorilla burst. As a result, it is only seen in a series of brief shots totaling less than 15 seconds, and the ape suit was used in most of the filming.

Baker was extremely disappointed in the final suit, which he felt was not at all convincing. He gives all the credit for its passable appearance to cinematographer Richard H. Kline. The only time that the collaboration of Baker and Rambaldi went smoothly was during the design of the mechanical Kong mask. Baker's design and Rambaldi's cable work combined to give Kong's face a wide range of expression that was responsible for much of the film's emotional impact. Baker gave much of the credit for its effectiveness to Rambaldi and his mechanics.

To film the scene where the Petrox Explorer finds Dwan in the life raft, Jessica Lange spent hours in a rubber raft in the freezing cold, drenched and wearing only a slinky black dress. Shooting of this scene took place in the channel between Los Angeles and Catalina Island during the last week in January 1976.

On one of the nights of filming Kong's death at the World Trade Center, over 30,000 people showed up at the site to be extras for the scene. Although the crowd was well behaved, the Port Authority of New York and New Jersey (owner of the World Trade Center complex) became concerned that the weight of so many people would cause the plaza to collapse, and ordered the producers to shut down the filming. However, the film makers had already got the shot they wanted of the large crowd rushing toward Kong's body. They returned to the site days later to finish filming the scene, with a much smaller crowd of paid extras.

The roar used for Kong was taken from the film The Land Unknown (1957).

== Music ==
The film's score was composed and conducted by John Barry. A soundtrack album of highlights from the score was released in 1976 by Reprise Records on LP. This album was reissued on CD, first as a bootleg by the Italian label Mask in 1998, and then as a legitimate, licensed release by Film Score Monthly in 2005. On October 2, 2012, Film Score Monthly released the complete score on a two-disc set; the first disc features the remastered complete score, while the second disc contains the remastered original album, along with alternate takes of various cues.

== Release ==
=== Distribution ===
The film opened on December 17, 1976, in 974 theaters in the United States and Canada and was in 2,200 theaters worldwide on or immediately after December 17.

==== Extended television version ====
NBC bought the rights to air the movie from De Laurentiis for $19.5 million, which was the highest amount any network had ever paid for a film at that time. When King Kong made its television debut over two nights in September 1978, around 60 minutes of extra footage was inserted to make the film longer, and it had some added or replaced music cues. Additionally, to obtain a lower, family-friendly television rating, overtly violent or sexual scenes in the theatrical version were trimmed down or replaced with less explicit takes, and all swearing or potentially offensive language was removed. Further broadcasts of the extended version followed in November 1980 and March 1983.

=== Home media ===
The theatrical version of the film has been released numerous times worldwide on all known home video formats. Of the DVDs, only a few European editions feature any notable extras; these include a 2005 "Making Kong" featurette (22:20) and up to 10 deleted scenes from the extended TV version (16:10). On May 11, 2021, the movie was released to Blu-ray in the United States and Canada courtesy of Shout! Factory-owned brand Scream Factory. The release includes both the theatrical and extended TV cuts.

== Reception ==
=== Box office ===
King Kong did not match De Laurentiis's or studio expectations at the box office. Laurentiis claimed that the film would outgross the previous year's Jaws and Paramount expected it to gross $150 million. Despite the perceived failure, the film was highly profitable, earning back over triple its budget.

In the United States and Canada, King Kong opened at number one at the box office grossing $7,023,921 in its opening weekend which was Paramount's biggest opening weekend at that time, and set the record for a December opening. However, it just failed to surpass the opening weekend set by Jaws of $7,061,053, despite being in double the number of theaters. Worldwide, it grossed $26 million within ten days from 1,500 of the 2,200 theaters it had opened in, including $18 million from the United States and Canada (compared to Jaws' $21 million in the United States and Canada for the same period). The film went on to gross $52 million in the United States and Canada, and just over $90 million worldwide. It was the fourth-highest-grossing film released in 1976 in the United States, and the third-highest-grossing film released in 1976 worldwide. As it was a year-end release grossing the majority of its total in 1977, the film was included on Variety's chart of the top domestic (U.S. and Canada) moneymakers of 1977 where it ended up at fifth place.

=== Critical response ===
Pauline Kael from The New Yorker praised the film, noting the "movie is a romantic adventure fantasy—colossal, silly, touching, a marvelous Classics Comics movie (and for the whole family). This new Kong doesn't have the magical primeval imagery of the first King Kong, in 1933, and it doesn't have the Gustave Doré fable atmosphere, but it's a happier, livelier entertainment. The first Kong was a stunt film that was trying to awe you, and its lewd underlay had a carnival hucksterism that made you feel a little queasy. This new Kong isn't a horror movie—it's an absurdist love story." Richard Schickel from Time wrote that "The special effects are marvelous, the good-humored script is comic-bookish without being excessively campy, and there are two excellent performances" from Charles Grodin and Kong. Arthur D. Murphy of Variety wrote that the film is "one of the most successful remakes in the brief (but remake-blotched) history of motion pictures. Faithful in substantial degree not only to the letter but also the spirit of the 1933 classic for RKO, this new version neatly balances superb special effects with solid dramatic credibility."

Vincent Canby, reviewing for The New York Times, claimed the movie was "inoffensive, uncomplicated fun, as well as a dazzling display of what special-effects people can do when commissioned to construct a 40-foot-tall ape who can walk, make fondling gestures, and smiles a lot." However, he was critical of the use of the World Trade Center instead of the Empire State Building during the climax, but he praised the performances by Jeff Bridges and Grodin and the special effects creation of Kong. Charles Champlin of the Los Angeles Times called it "a spectacular film" that "for all its monumental scale retains the essential, sincere and simple charm of the beauty and the beast story." Gene Siskel of the Chicago Tribune had a mixed reaction, giving the film two-and-a-half stars out of four as he wrote, "The original Kong took itself seriously; and so, even now, 43 years later, do we. But the kidding around in the new film, though frequently amusing, knocks down the myth its special effects staff has so earnestly tried to build." Jonathan Rosenbaum of The Monthly Film Bulletin wrote that the remake "moves along reasonably well as a half-jokey, half-serious contemporary 'reading' of its predecessor; as an accomplishment in horror and fantasy adventure, it does not measure up to even the small toe of the original."

The movie's success helped launch the career of Jessica Lange, although she reportedly received some negative publicity regarding her debut performance that, according to film reviewer Marshall Fine, "almost destroyed her career". Although Lange won the Golden Globe Award for Best Acting Debut in a Motion Picture – Female for Kong at the 34th Golden Globe Awards, she did not appear in another film for three years and spent that time training intensively in acting.

Critical responses to King Kong continue to be mixed. On the review aggregator website Rotten Tomatoes, the film has an approval rating of 55% based on 51 reviews with an average rating of 5.1/10. The critical consensus reads that "King Kong represents a significant visual upgrade over the original, but falls short of its classic predecessor in virtually every other respect." Metacritic, another aggregator, sampled 11 critics and calculated a weighted average score of 61 out of 100, indicating "generally favorable" reviews.

=== Accolades ===
The film received two Academy Award nominations and won one Special Achievement Award for its visual effects at the 49th Academy Awards.

- Winner Best Visual Effects (Carlo Rambaldi, Glen Robinson and Frank Van der Veer), shared with Logan's Run (1976).
- Nominee Best Cinematography (Richard H. Kline)
- Nominee Best Sound (Harry W. Tetrick, William McCaughey, Aaron Rochin and Jack Solomon).

=== Controversy ===
Before Michael Eisner pitched the idea of a remake of King Kong to Barry Diller, he had earlier mentioned the idea to Sidney Sheinberg, the CEO and president of MCA Inc./Universal Pictures. A short time later, Universal decided to purchase the property as an opportunity to showcase its new sound system technology, Sensurround, which had debuted with the disaster film Earthquake, for Kong's roars. On April 5, 1975, Daniel O'Shea, a semi-retired attorney for RKO-General, had arranged meetings with Arnold Stane, attorney for MCA/Universal, and De Laurentiis and Sidewater for the film rights to King Kong. Neither side knew that a rival studio was also negotiating with RKO-General. Stane had negotiated for Universal an offer of $200,000 plus 5 percent of the film's net profit. In contrast, De Laurentiis offered $200,000 plus 3 percent of the film's gross—and 10 percent if the film recouped two and a half its negative cost. In May 1975, the film rights were granted to De Laurentiis.

In the wake of the agreement, Shane claimed that O'Shea had verbally accepted Universal's offer, although no official paperwork was signed. O'Shea contested, "I did not make any agreement written or oral ... never told him we had an agreement, nor words to that effect ... never told him that I had the authority ... I am not an employee, agent, or officer at RKO." A few days later, Universal filed suit against De Laurentiis and RKO-General in Los Angeles Superior Court for $25 million on charges of breach of contract, fraud, and intentional interference with advantageous business relations. In October 1975, Universal, which was in pre-production with its own remake with Hunt Stromberg Jr. as producer and Joseph Sargent as director, filed suit in a federal district court arguing that the story's "basic ingredients" were public domain. Universal had claimed that its remake was based on the two-part serialization by Edgar Wallace and a novelization by Delos W. Lovelace adapted from the screenplay that had been published shortly before the film's release in 1933.

Universal started production on The Legend of King Kong on January 5, 1976, with Bo Goldman writing the screenplay based on the novelization by Lovelace. On November 20, RKO-General countersued Universal for $5 million alleging that The Legend of King Kong was an infringement on their copyright, and asked the court to prevent any "announcements, representations, and statements" on their proposed film. On December 4, De Laurentiis countersued for $90 million with charges of copyright infringement and "unfair competition". In January 1976, both studios agreed to withdraw their legal suits filed against each other. Universal agreed to cancel The Legend of King Kong, but intended to proceed with a remake sometime in the future on the condition that it release at least eighteen months after De Laurentiis's remake. In September 1976, a federal judge ruled in favor of Universal that Lovelace's novelization had fallen into public domain, which cleared the studio to produce a remake. Universal later produced a remake, also titled King Kong, in 2005, although that film was allowed to use elements of the 1933 film (which is still under copyright) as a result of Universal being sold the film rights from the estate of Merian C. Cooper.

== Bibliography ==
- Bahrenburg, Bruce (1976). The Creation of Dino De Laurentiis King Kong. New York City: Pocket Books. ISBN 9780671807962.
- Morton, Ray (2005). King Kong: The History of a Movie Icon from Fay Wray to Peter Jackson. New York City: Applause Theatre & Cinema Books. ISBN 9781557836694. OCLC 61261236.
- Gilberto Neri, Giant Gorilla Movies. A Critical History of Giant Apes, Gorilla Monsters, Ape-Men, and Television Creatures, 2026, pp. 267, ISBN 979-8198078628
- Id., It's Kong Craze! The Totally UNofficial 50th Anniversary Guide to Why the 1976 De Laurentiis Remake Changed the World, 2026, pp. 267, ISBN 979-8172356810
