= Cité de l'espace =

French theme park about spaceflight

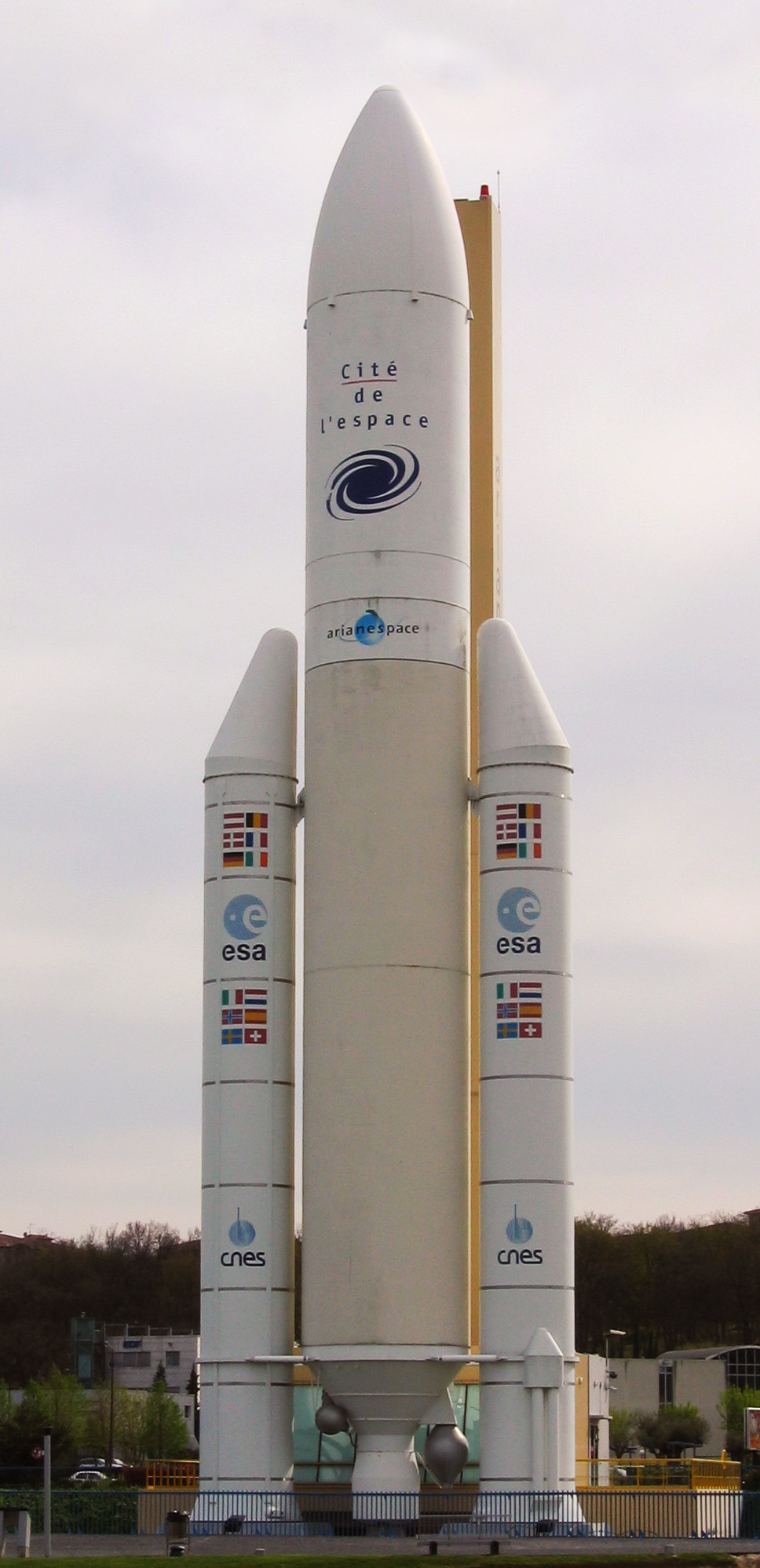
- Ariane 5 mock-up at Cité de l'espace
- Interactive map of Cité de l'espace
- Location: Toulouse, France
- Coordinates: 43°35′13″N 1°29′35″E
- Status: Operating
- Opened: 27 June 1997
- Theme: Spaceflight
- Attendance: 200,000 (2004)
- Area: 3.5 hectares (9 acres)
- Website: www.cite-espace.com

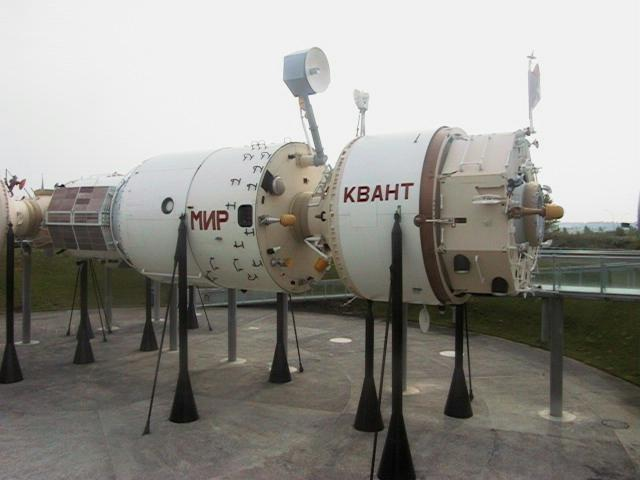
Full-size Mir at Cité de l'espace

The Cité de l'espace (French for Space City; Occitan: Ciutat de l'espaci) is a scientific discovery centre in France focused on spaceflight. It was opened in June 1997, and is located on the eastern outskirts of Toulouse. It was carried out on the initiative of the Town Hall of Toulouse with the participation of numerous partners such as the Regional Council of Midi-Pyrénées, the Ministries of Equipment, Transport, Defence, National Education, Research and Technology, the National Center for Space Studies (CNES), Météo-France, EADS, Astrium, among others. As of 2012, there had been more than four million visitors.

== Exhibits and installations ==
Full-scale models of the Ariane 5 rocket (55 metres or 180 feet), Mir, and Soyuz modules can be seen in the museum. The original planetarium has 140 seats and presents shows throughout the day. Cité de l'espace also has numerous exhibits, often interactive; for example, a mock-up of a control room near the model of Ariane 5 allows visitors to prepare the launching of a rocket, help with its flight and then place a satellite in orbit. Terr@dome (a terrestrial half-sphere 25 m (82 ft) in diameter) presents the history of space from the Big Bang to the creation of the Solar System.

The Astralia, a building which opened in 2005, houses both a 280-seat planetarium, equipped with a 600 m^{2} (6,458 sq ft) hemispherical screen and a 300-seat IMAX theatre, showing sequences filmed in space (such as Hubble 3D).

== History ==
- 1994 to 1997: Development of the Cité de l'espace spearheaded by Jean-Michel Oberto, the founding director of the park.
- June 1997: Opening of the Cité de l'espace by Dominique Baudis, Representant-Mayor of Toulouse, and Claudie Haigneré, spationaut and godmother of the park.
- July 1998: Opening of the full scale Mir.
- September 2000: The millionth visitor is welcomed to the Cité.
- October 2000: Opening of the Terr@dome.
- October 2002: Opening of a permanent exhibition hall about Mars.
- July 2003: Start point of the 13th stage of the Tour de France.
- October 2003: The Cité de l'espace is officially designated a "Tourisme et Handicap" site for the four types of handicap (mental, visual, motor, hearing).
- April 2005: Opening of "Astralia - le 6ème continent", (the 6th continent), notably housing the planetarium and the IMAX cinema.
- May 2006: Opening of an area for children, "la Base des Enfants".
- July 2007: On the occasion of the 10th anniversary of the park, an "open house" weekend was organised. More than 20,000 people attended the many events and fireworks that had been organised.
- May 2012: Organization of the annual ECSITE conference: 1,000 professionals from 40 countries.
- 2013: Acquisition of a Martian meteorite.
- April 2014: Opening of La Coupole de l'Astronome. and new educational laboratories
- July 2017: Opening of the renovated planetarium.
- June 2022: 25th anniversary of Parc.

== Some figures ==
- 200,000 visitors in 2004
- Park area: 3.5 hectares (9 acres)
- 2,000 square metres (21,500 sq ft) of exhibition space
- 2 planetariums of 140 and 280 seats, 15 metres (49 ft) and 20 metres (66 ft) in diameter respectively.
