= 1974 Academy Awards =

1974 Academy Awards may refer to:

- 46th Academy Awards, the Academy Awards ceremony that took place in 1974
- 47th Academy Awards, the 1975 ceremony honoring the best in film for 1974
