= Glen Robinson (visual effects) =

American special and visual effects artist (1914–2002)

Thomas Glenn Robinson
- Born: September 20, 1914; Idaho, U.S.
- Died: March 27, 2002 (aged 87); Los Angeles, California, U.S.
- Occupation: Visual effects artist
- Years active: 1936–1984
- Children: 5

Thomas Glenn Robinson, better known as Glen Robinson (September 20, 1914 – March 27, 2002), was an American special and visual effects artist, winner of six Academy Awards: two Academy Awards for Technical Achievement and four Special Achievement Academy Awards. As a special effects artist, his career spans over six decades from the mid-1930s to the mid-1980s, having worked literally on dozens of films.

== Biography ==
Glen Robinson was born Thomas Glenn Robinson in Idaho on September 20, 1914. When aged twelve his family moved to Los Angeles city and in 1932, at the age of 18, he graduated from Venice High School. In 1936 he was hired by the Metro-Goldwyn-Mayer company, where he became the studio's top special effects coordinator.

Alongside his special effects career, Robinson was an engineer of roller coaster and double Ferris wheel attractions at amusement and theme parks that included Magic Mountain (Golden, Colorado; Valencia, California), Pleasure Island (Wakefield, Massachusetts), Freedomland U.S.A. (New York) and Space City USA (near Huntsville, Alabama). In the book, Freedomland U.S.A.: The Definitive History (Theme Park Press, 2019), Robinson is credited for his work at the park. However, his specific contributions to Freedomland remain undetermined. Space City USA never was completed.

Glen Robinson died of natural causes on March 27, 2002, at the Motion Picture & Television Country House and Hospital in Woodland Hills, Los Angeles, California. He died on the same day as three other Hollywood stars: actor Dudley Moore, comedian Milton Berle and film director and screenwriter Billy Wilder. Robinson was aged 87 and at the moment of his death he was survived by five children (two sons and three daughters), fourteen grandchildren and thirteen great-grandchildren.

== Selected filmography ==
- The Wizard of Oz (1939, special effects prop shop, uncredited)
- Forbidden Planet (1956, special effects technician, uncredited)
- The Rat Patrol (TV Series, special effects), three episodes:
  - The Last Chance Raid (1967)
  - Two for One Raid (1967)
  - The One That Got Away Raid (1967)
- The Bamboo Saucer (1968, special effects)
- Battle of Britain (1969, special effects)
- Tora! Tora! Tora! (1970, mechanical effects, uncredited)
- Earthquake (1974, special effects)
- The Hindenburg (1975, special mechanical effects, credited as Glenn Robinson)
- Logan's Run (1976, special effects)
- King Kong (1976, special effects)
- Demon Seed (1977, special mechanical effects – uncredited)
- Hurricane (1979, special effects)
- Meteor (1979, special effects supervisor)
- Kaala Patthar (1979, special effects)
- Flash Gordon (1980, special effects consultant)
- Island Claws (1980, special effects)
- Pennies from Heaven (1981, special effects)
- Dead Men Don't Wear Plaid (1982, special effects)
- Amityville II: The Possession (1982, special effects supervisor)
- Meatballs Part II (1984, special effects)

== Awards ==
=== Two Academy Awards for Technical Achievement ===
- 1952 (24th): "for the development of a new music wire and cable cutter"
- 1960 (32nd): "for the design of a multiple-cable, remote-controlled winch", shared with Winfield Hubbard and Luther Newman, both from the Metro-Goldwyn-Mayer Studio Construction Department

=== Four Special Achievement Academy Awards ===
- 1975 (47th): for Best Visual Effects for Earthquake (1974), shared with Frank Brendel and Albert Whitlock
- 1976 (48th): for Best Visual Effects for The Hindenburg (1975), shared with Albert Whitlock
- 1977 (49th): for Best Visual Effects for King Kong (1976), shared with Carlo Rambaldi and Frank Van der Veer
- 1977 (49th): for Best Visual Effects for Logan's Run (1976), shared with L. B. Abbott and Matthew Yuricich
