= Frank Van der Veer =

American optical and visual special effects artist

- Born: June 2, 1921; New York City, New York
- Died: January 7, 1982 (aged 60); Los Angeles County, California
- Occupation: Visual effects artist
- Years active: 1950–1982
- Spouse: Velma "Val" Van der Veer (March 9, 1930 – Oct. 20, 2009)
- Children: 3

Frank Willard Van der Veer (June 2, 1921 – January 7, 1982) was an American optical and visual special effects artist who won (and shared) a Special Achievement Academy Award at the 49th Academy Awards for Best Visual Effects for the film King Kong (1976). His career spanned over three decades from the 1950s until his death in the early 1980s, having participated in the Hollywood special effects industry with such other films as The Towering Inferno (1974), Killer Bees (1974), Logan's Run (1976), Star Wars (1977), 1941 (1979), Flash Gordon (1980), Clash of the Titans (1981) and Conan the Barbarian (1982).

Frank Van der Veer was the son of the American cinematographer Willard Van der Veer (1894–1963).

== Biography ==
Frank Van der Veer was a veteran of World War II, where he served as a combat photographer in Europe, the Philippines, and Japan. After the war he began his career in the 1950s working for the Warner Brothers and 20th Century Fox special effects departments. Then, a few years later, on August 13, 1963, he founded Van Der Veer Photo Effects with partner Bill Dorney, after having apprenticed with Bill Abbott from 1950 to 1957 in the 20th Century Fox studios. In 1977, he won a Special Achievement Academy Award for King Kong (1976). This award was shared with Carlo Rambaldi and Glen Robinson. Frank's father, Willard Van der Veer, had also won an Oscar, 47 years before. That was on November 5, 1930, at the 3rd Academy Awards, for Best Cinematography for the film With Byrd at the South Pole with Joseph T. Rucker.

In the time he ran his company, Van der Veer worked both for the television and film industries. For the television medium, he contributed in the effects of the original Star Trek series (1966) and, in 1978, he was nominated for an Emmy for his work on The Return of Captain Nemo.

Van Der Veer Photo Effects worked on lightsabres for the movie Star Wars (1977).

Frank Van der Veer died on January 7, 1982. He was buried at the Forest Lawn Memorial Park, Glendale, Los Angeles County, California. His company, Van Der Veer Photo Effects, survived him for 15 years more until it was dissolved on October 4, 1997.

== Selected filmography ==
=== Credited as Frank Van der Veer ===
- Killer Bees (1974, TV movie, special optical effects)
- Logan's Run (1976, additional visuals)
- King Kong (1976, supervisor of photographic effects)
- Orca (1977, photographic effects supervisor)
- The Manitou (1978, photographic optical effects supervisor)
- Hurricane (1979, supervisor of photographic effects)
- 1941 (1979, blue screen consultant)
- Flash Gordon (1980, supervisor: special photographic effects)
- Clash of the Titans (1981, special opticals)
- Conan the Barbarian (1982, special visual effects)

=== Credited as Van der Veer Photo Effects ===
- Star Trek: The Original Series (in end credits)
- Star Wars (1977, additional optical effects – miniature and optical effects unit)
- The Empire Strikes Back (1980, additional optical effects)

== Van Der Veer Photo Effects selected filmography (after Van Der Veer died) ==
- Tron (1982, additional animation compositing camera)
- Return of the Jedi (1983, additional optical effects)
- Twilight Zone: The Movie (1983, additional optical effects, segment 4, uncredited)
- The Man Who Wasn't There (1983, opticals)
- The Bounty (1984, opticals, credited as "Frank Van der Veer Labs")
- Conan the Destroyer (1984, titles and opticals)
- The Last Starfighter (1984, optical effects)
- Red Sonja (1985, titles and opticals)
- Raw Deal (1986, titles and opticals)
- Blue Velvet (1986, titles and opticals)
- Superman IV: The Quest for Peace (1987, opticals)
- Russkies (1987, titles and opticals)
- After Midnight (1989, additional optical effects)
- Catchfire (1990, titles and opticals)
- Tales from the Darkside: The Movie (1990, optical effects)
- The Dark Backward (1991, montage opticals)
- Love Crimes (1992, titles and opticals, credited as "Van der Veer Visual Effects")
