= 47th Academy Awards =

- Date: April 8, 1975
- Site: Dorothy Chandler Pavilion, Los Angeles, California
- Hosted by: Bob Hope, Shirley MacLaine, Sammy Davis Jr. and Frank Sinatra
- Produced by: Howard W. Koch
- Directed by: Marty Pasetta

Highlights
- Best Picture: The Godfather Part II
- Most awards: The Godfather Part II (6)
- Most nominations: Chinatown and The Godfather Part II (11)

TV in the United States
- Network: NBC

The 47th Academy Awards were presented Tuesday, April 8, 1975, at the Dorothy Chandler Pavilion in Los Angeles, California, honoring the best films of 1974. The ceremonies were presided over by Bob Hope, Shirley MacLaine, Sammy Davis Jr., and Frank Sinatra. This was the final ceremony to air on NBC; in the following year ABC acquired the U.S. broadcasting rights and has hosted the awards show since.

The success of The Godfather Part II was notable; it received twice as many Oscars as its predecessor (six) and duplicated its feat of three Best Supporting Actor nominations (as of the 98th Academy Awards, it is the last film to receive three nominations in a single acting category). Between the two of them, father and son Carmine and Francis Ford Coppola won four awards, with Carmine winning for Best Original Dramatic Score (with Nino Rota) and Francis for Picture, Director, and Best Screenplay Adapted from Other Material (with Mario Puzo).

Prior to the ceremony, Dustin Hoffman, who was nominated for his performance in the film Lenny, described the awards as "ugly" and "grotesque" and likened the ceremony to a beauty pageant, causing host Hope to remark that "if Dustin Hoffman wins tonight, he's going to have a friend pick it up for him—George C. Scott." Ingrid Bergman felt that she won her Academy Award out of a collective showbusiness guilt over her being ostracized from Hollywood in 1949 due to her affair with director Roberto Rossellini and that Valentina Cortese was worthy of the Best Supporting Actress Oscar. Upon winning the Best Documentary Feature Oscar for Hearts and Minds, co-producer Bert Schneider said, "It's ironic that we're here at a time just before Vietnam is about to be liberated," and then read a telegram containing "Greetings of Friendship to All American People" from Ambassador Dinh Ba Thi of the Provisional Revolutionary Government (Viet Cong) delegation to the Paris Peace Accords. The telegram thanked the anti-war movement "for all they have done on behalf of peace". The speech infuriated Hope, who later wrote a telegram that he had Sinatra read to the divided audience. The note said: "The academy is saying, 'We are not responsible for any political references made on the program, and we are sorry they had to take place this evening.'" This speech infuriated a third co-host, Shirley MacLaine, and actor Warren Beatty, who sarcastically retorted "thank you, Frank, you old Republican". MacLaine, for her part, remarked "You said you were speaking for the Academy. Well, I'm a member of the Academy and you didn't ask me!".

This was the only Oscar ceremony in which all five of the nominees in a single category were released by the same studio: all five Best Costume Design nominations were for films released by Paramount Pictures.

== Winners and nominees ==
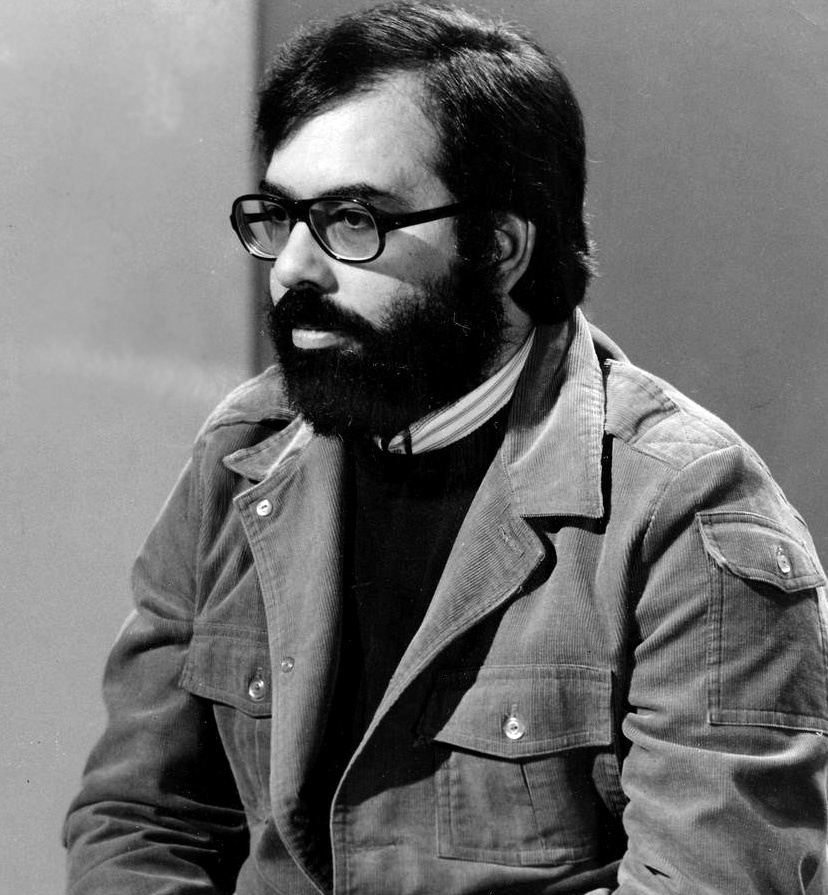
Francis Ford Coppola, Best Director winner, Best Picture co-winner, and Best Adapted Screenplay co-winner

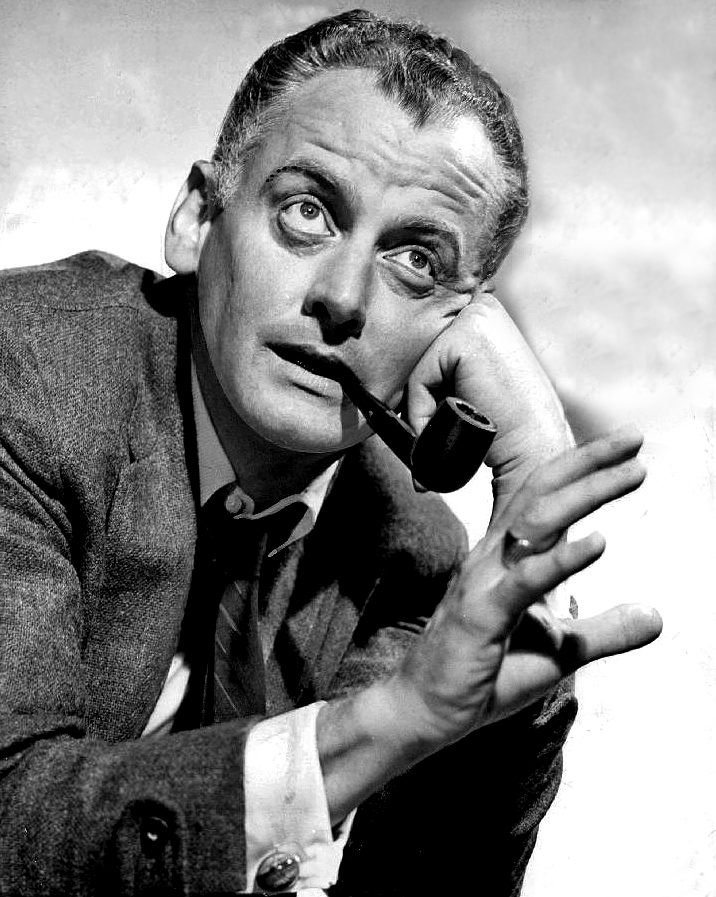
Art Carney, Best Actor winner

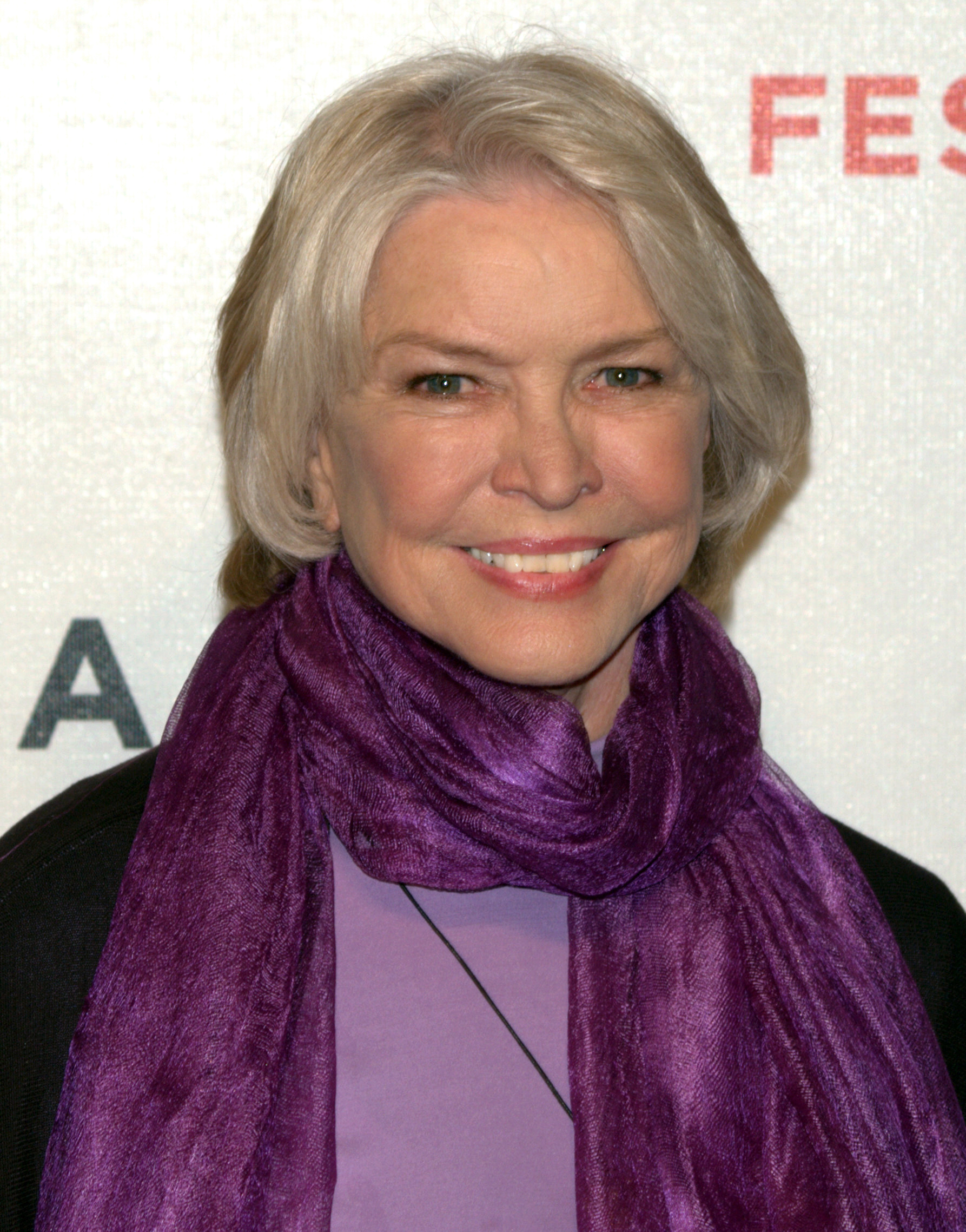
Ellen Burstyn, Best Actress winner

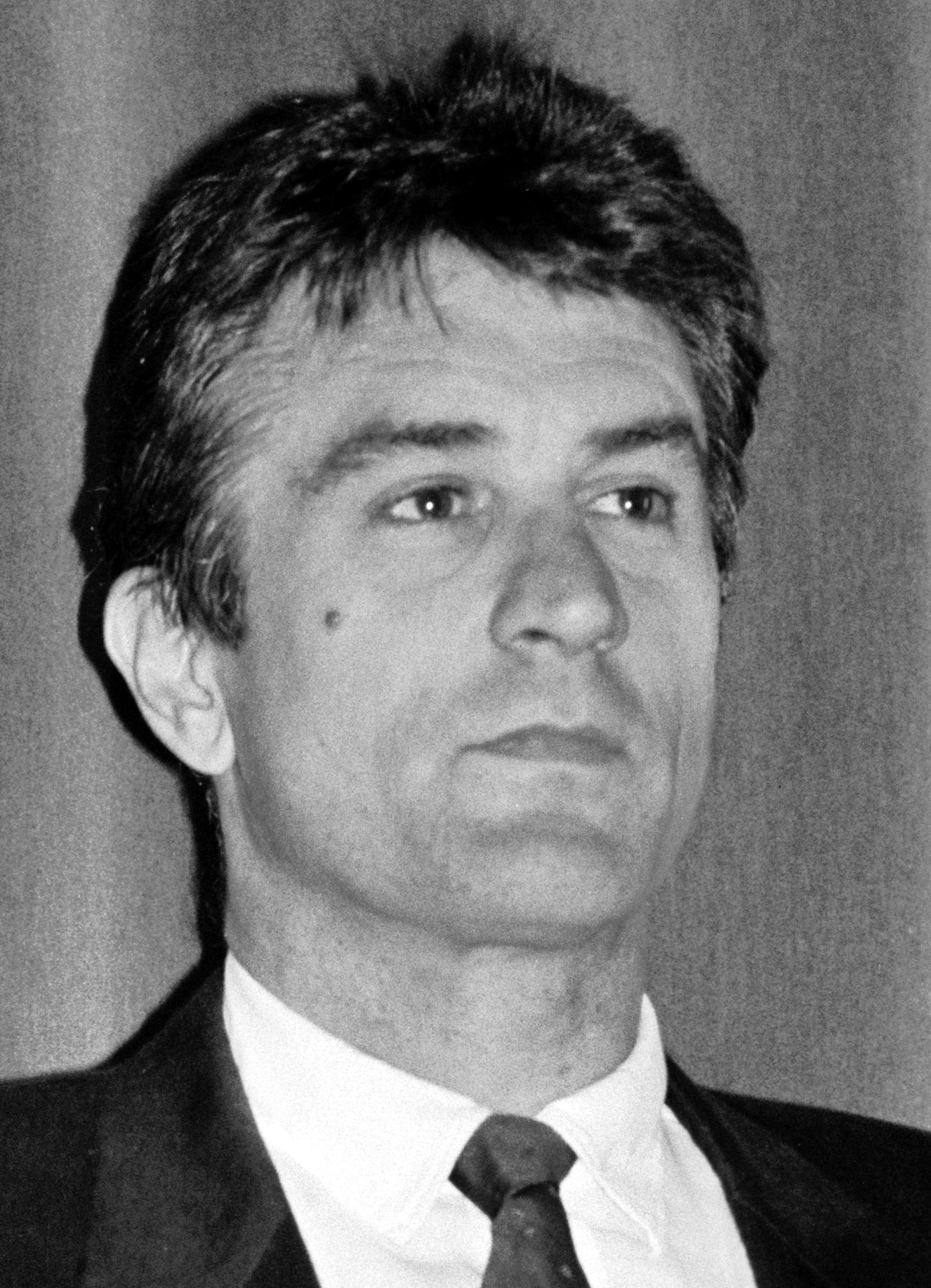
Robert De Niro, Best Supporting Actor winner

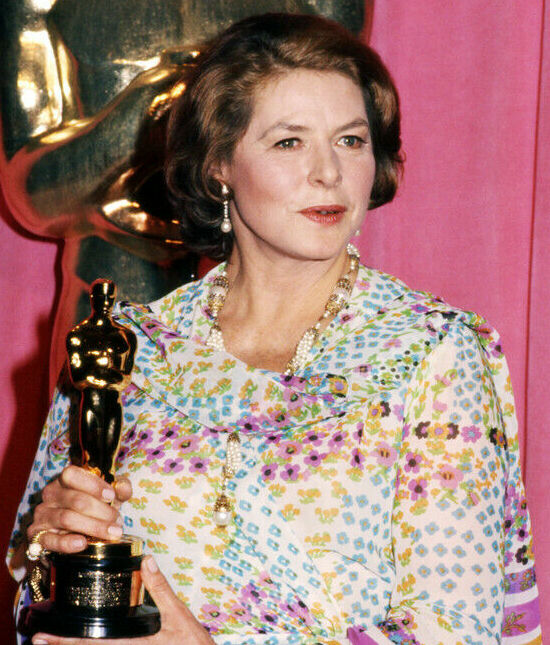
Ingrid Bergman, Best Supporting Actress winner

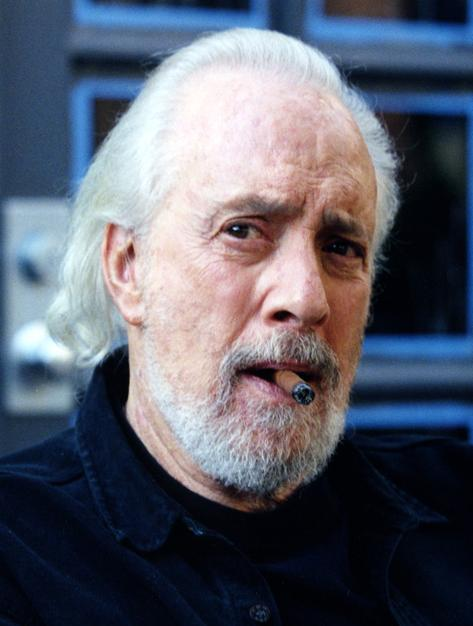
Robert Towne, Best Original Screenplay winner

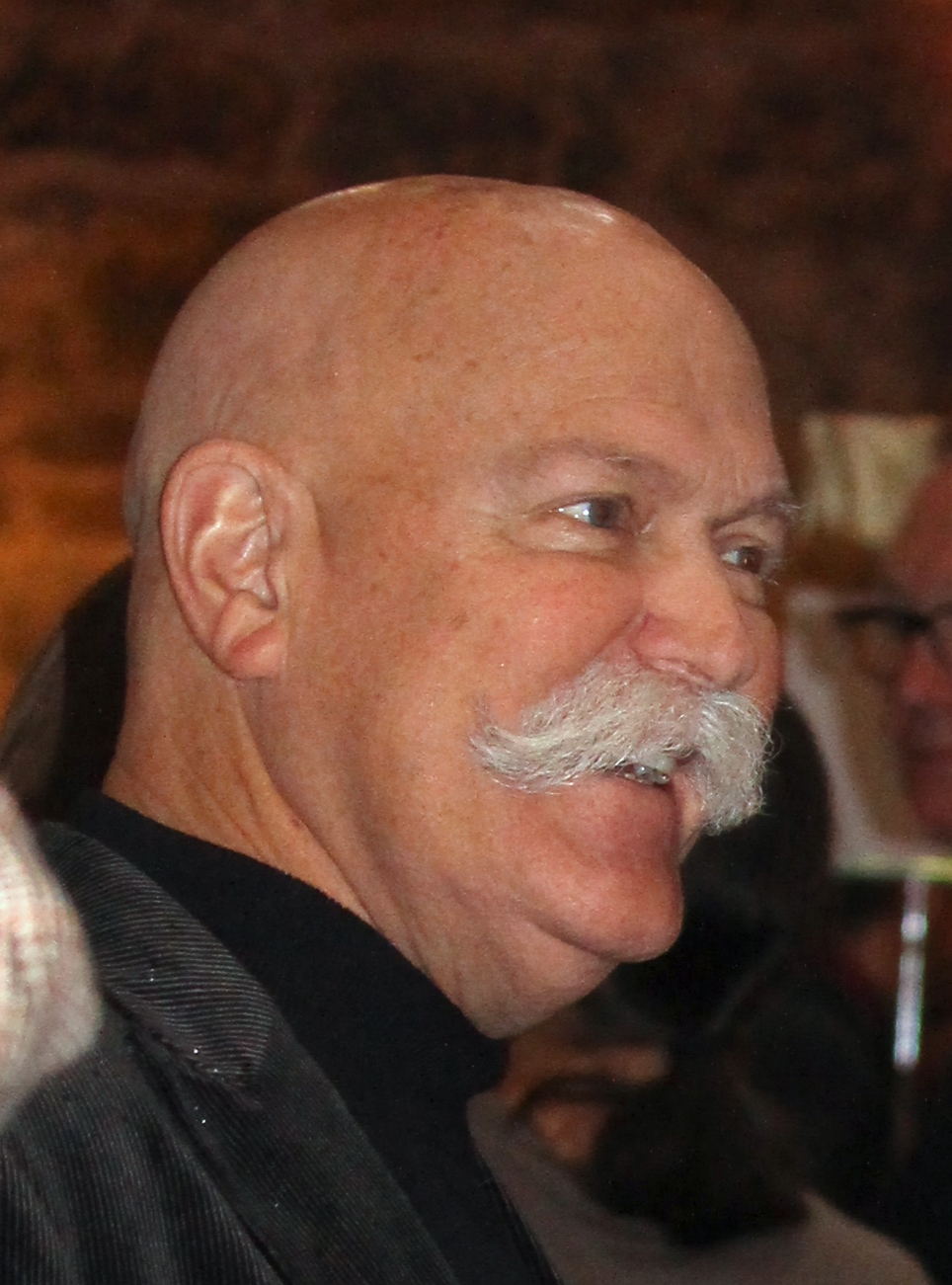
Will Vinton, Best Animated Short Film co-winner

Nominees were announced on February 24, 1975. Winners are listed first and highlighted in boldface.

**Best Picture**: **The Godfather Part II – Francis Ford Coppola, producer; Gray Frederickson and Fred Roos, co–producers**; Chinatown – Robert Evans, producer; The Conversation – Francis Ford Coppola, producer; Fred Roos, co-producer; Lenny – Marvin Worth, producer; The Towering Inferno – Irwin Allen, producer	**Best Directing**: **Francis Ford Coppola – The Godfather Part II**; Roman Polanski – Chinatown; François Truffaut – Day for Night; Bob Fosse – Lenny; John Cassavetes – A Woman Under the Influence
**Best Actor**: **Art Carney – Harry and Tonto as Harry Coombes**; Albert Finney – Murder on the Orient Express as Hercule Poirot; Dustin Hoffman – Lenny as Lenny Bruce; Jack Nicholson – Chinatown as J.J. "Jake" Gittes; Al Pacino – The Godfather Part II as Michael Corleone	**Best Actress**: **Ellen Burstyn – Alice Doesn't Live Here Anymore as Alice Hyatt**; Diahann Carroll – Claudine as Claudine Price; Faye Dunaway – Chinatown as Evelyn Cross Mulwray; Valerie Perrine – Lenny as Honey Bruce; Gena Rowlands – A Woman Under the Influence as Mabel Longhetti
**Best Actor in a Supporting Role**: **Robert De Niro – The Godfather Part II as Vito Corleone**; Fred Astaire – The Towering Inferno as Harlee Claiborne; Jeff Bridges – Thunderbolt and Lightfoot as Lightfoot; Michael V. Gazzo – The Godfather Part II as Frank Pentangeli; Lee Strasberg – The Godfather Part II as Hyman Roth	**Best Actress in a Supporting Role**: **Ingrid Bergman – Murder on the Orient Express as Greta Ohlsson**; Valentina Cortese – Day for Night as Severine; Madeline Kahn – Blazing Saddles as Lili von Shtupp; Diane Ladd – Alice Doesn't Live Here Anymore as Florence "Flo" Castleberry; Talia Shire – The Godfather Part II as Connie Corleone
**Best Writing (Original Screenplay)**: **Chinatown – Robert Towne**; Alice Doesn't Live Here Anymore – Robert Getchell; The Conversation – Francis Ford Coppola; Day for Night – François Truffaut, Suzanne Schiffman and Jean-Louis Richard; Harry and Tonto – Paul Mazursky and Josh Greenfeld	**Best Writing (Screenplay Adapted from Other Material)**: **The Godfather Part II – Francis Ford Coppola and Mario Puzo based on the novel The Godfather by Mario Puzo**; The Apprenticeship of Duddy Kravitz – Mordecai Richler and Lionel Chetwynd based on the novel by Mordecai Richler; Lenny – Julian Barry based on his play; Murder on the Orient Express – Paul Dehn based on the novel by Agatha Christie; Young Frankenstein – Gene Wilder and Mel Brooks based on Mary Shelley's Frankenstein
**Best Foreign Language Film**: **Amarcord – Italy**; Cats' Play – Hungary; The Deluge – Poland; Lacombe, Lucien – France; The Truce – Argentina	**Best Documentary (Feature)**: **Hearts and Minds – Peter Davis and Bert Schneider**; The 81st Blow – Jacques Ehrlich, David Bergman and Haim Gouri; Antonia: A Portrait of the Woman – Judy Collins and Jill Godmilow; The Challenge... A Tribute to Modern Art – Herbert Kline; The Wild and the Brave – Natalie R. Jones and Eugene S. Jones
**Best Documentary (Short Subject)**: **Don't – Robin Lehman**; City Out of Wilderness – Francis Thompson; Exploratorium – Jon Boorstin; John Muir's High Sierra – Dewitt Jones and Lesley Foster; Naked Yoga – Ronald S. Kass and Mervyn Lloyd	**Best Short Film (Live Action)**: **One-Eyed Men Are Kings – Paul Claudon and Edmond Séchan**; Climb – Dewitt Jones; The Concert – Julian Chagrin and Claude Chagrin; Planet Ocean – George V. Casey; The Violin – Andrew Welsh and George Pastic
**Best Short Film (Animated)**: **Closed Mondays – Will Vinton and Bob Gardiner**; The Family That Dwelt Apart – Yvon Mallette and Robert Verrall; Hunger – Peter Foldes and René Jodoin; Voyage to Next – John Hubley and Faith Hubley; Winnie the Pooh and Tigger Too – Wolfgang Reitherman	**Best Music (Original Dramatic Score)**: **The Godfather Part II – Nino Rota and Carmine Coppola**; Chinatown – Jerry Goldsmith; Murder on the Orient Express – Richard Rodney Bennett; Shanks – Alex North; The Towering Inferno – John Williams
**Best Music (Scoring: Original Song Score and Adaptation -or- Scoring: Adaptation)**: **The Great Gatsby – Adapted by Nelson Riddle**; The Little Prince – Song Score by Alan Jay Lerner and Frederick Loewe; Adapted by Angela Morley and Douglas Gamley; Phantom of the Paradise – Song Score by Paul Williams; Adapted by Paul Williams and George Aliceson Tipton	**Best Music (Song)**: **"We May Never Love Like This Again" — The Towering Inferno • Music and Lyrics by Al Kasha and Joel Hirschhorn**; "Benji's Theme (I Feel Love)" — Benji • Music by Euel Box • Lyrics by Betty Box; "Blazing Saddles" — Blazing Saddles • Music by John Morris • Lyrics by Mel Brooks; "Little Prince" — The Little Prince • Music by Frederick Loewe • Lyrics by Alan Jay Lerner; "Wherever Love Takes Me" — Gold • Music by Elmer Bernstein • Lyrics by Don Black
**Best Sound**: **Earthquake – Ronald Pierce and Melvin Metcalfe Sr.**; Chinatown – Bud Grenzbach and Larry Jost; The Conversation – Walter Murch and Arthur Rochester; The Towering Inferno – Theodore Soderberg and Herman Lewis; Young Frankenstein – Richard Portman and Gene Cantamessa	**Best Art Direction**: **The Godfather Part II – Art Direction: Dean Tavoularis and Angelo P. Graham; Set Decoration: George R. Nelson**; Chinatown – Art Direction: Richard Sylbert and W. Stewart Campbell; Set Decoration: Ruby R. Levitt; Earthquake – Art Direction: Alexander Golitzen and E. Preston Ames; Set Decoration: Frank R. McKelvy; The Island at the Top of the World – Art Direction: Peter Ellenshaw, John B. Mansbridge, Walter H. Tyler and Al Roelofs; Set Decoration: Hal Gausman; The Towering Inferno – Art Direction: William J. Creber and Ward Preston; Set Decoration: Raphaël Bretton
**Best Cinematography**: **The Towering Inferno – Joseph Biroc and Fred J. Koenekamp**; Chinatown – John A. Alonzo; Earthquake – Philip H. Lathrop; Lenny – Bruce Surtees; Murder on the Orient Express – Geoffrey Unsworth	**Best Costume Design**: **The Great Gatsby – Theoni V. Aldredge**; Chinatown – Anthea Sylbert; Daisy Miller – John Furniss; The Godfather Part II – Theadora Van Runkle; Murder on the Orient Express – Tony Walton
**Best Film Editing**: **The Towering Inferno – Harold F. Kress and Carl Kress**; Blazing Saddles – John C. Howard and Danford Greene; Chinatown – Sam O'Steen; Earthquake – Dorothy Spencer; The Longest Yard – Michael Luciano

=== Special Achievement Award (Visual Effects) ===
- Earthquake — Frank Brendel, Glen Robinson and Albert Whitlock.

=== Honorary Award ===
- To Howard Hawks - a master American filmmaker whose creative efforts hold a distinguished place in world cinema.
- To Jean Renoir - a genius who, with grace, responsibility and enviable devotion through silent film, sound film, feature, documentary and television, has won the world's admiration.

=== Jean Hersholt Humanitarian Award ===
- Arthur B. Krim

=== Multiple nominations and awards ===
Films with multiple nominations
Nominations	Film
11	Chinatown
11	The Godfather Part II
8	The Towering Inferno
6	Lenny
6	Murder on the Orient Express
4	Earthquake (Note: Not counting the non-competitive Special Achievement Award for Earthquake.)
3	Alice Doesn't Live Here Anymore
3	Blazing Saddles
3	The Conversation
3	Day for Night
2	The Great Gatsby
2	Harry and Tonto
2	The Little Prince
2	A Woman Under the Influence
2	Young Frankenstein

Films with multiple awards
Awards	Film
6	The Godfather Part II
3	The Towering Inferno
2	The Great Gatsby

== Presenters and performers ==
The following individuals, listed in order of appearance, presented awards or performed musical numbers:

=== Presenters ===
Name	Role
Hank Simms	Announcer for the 47th Academy Awards
Walter Mirisch (AMPAS President)	Giver of opening remarks welcoming guests to the awards ceremony
Ryan O'Neal; Tatum O'Neal	Explainers of the voting rules to the public and presenters of the award for Best Supporting Actor
Francis Ford Coppola	Recipient of the award for Best Supporting Actor on behalf of Robert De Niro
Roddy McDowall; Brenda Vaccaro	Presenters of the Short Films Awards
Lauren Hutton; Danny Thomas	Presenters of the Documentary Awards
Ingrid Bergman	Presenter of the Honorary Award to Jean Renoir
Bob Hope	Presenter of the Special Achievement Award to Frank Brendel, Glen Robinson and Albert Whitlock for their work in Earthquake
Gene Kelly	Presenter of the award for Best Original Song
Joseph Bottoms; Deborah Raffin	Presenters of the award for Best Sound
John Wayne	Presenter of the Honorary Award to Howard Hawks
Diahann Carroll; Johnny Green	Presenters of the Music Awards
Lauren Bacall	Presenter of the award for Best Costume Design
Peter Falk; Katharine Ross	Presenters of the award for Best Supporting Actress
Susan Blakely; O. J. Simpson	Presenters of the award for Best Art Direction
Jon Voight; Raquel Welch	Presenters of the award for Best Cinematography
Macdonald Carey; Jennifer O'Neill	Presenters of the award for Best Film Editing
Susan George; Jack Valenti	Presenters of the award for Best Foreign Language Film
Frank Sinatra	Presenter of the Jean Hersholt Humanitarian Award to Arthur J. Krim
Goldie Hawn; Robert Wise	Presenters of the award for Best Director
James Michener	Presenter of the awards for Best Screenplay Adapted from Other Material and Best Original Screenplay
Glenda Jackson	Presenter of the award for Best Actor
Jack Lemmon	Presenter of the award for Best Actress
Warren Beatty	Presenter of the award for Best Picture

=== Performers ===
Name	Role	Performed
Johnny Green	Musical arranger and conductor	Orchestral
Frankie Laine	Performer	"Blazing Saddles" from Blazing Saddles
Jack Jones	Performer	“Little Prince” from The Little Prince
Aretha Franklin	Performer	"Wherever Love Takes Me" from Gold
Frankie Laine; Jack Jones; Aretha Franklin	Performers	"We May Never Love Like This Again" from The Towering Inferno and "Benji's Theme (I Feel Love)" from Benji
Frank Sinatra; Shirley MacLaine; Sammy Davis Jr. Bob Hope; Academy Awards Orchestra	Performers	"That's Entertainment!"

== See also ==
- 32nd Golden Globe Awards
- 1974 in film
- 17th Grammy Awards
- 26th Primetime Emmy Awards
- 27th Primetime Emmy Awards
- 28th British Academy Film Awards
- 29th Tony Awards
