= 1975 Academy Awards =

1975 Academy Awards may refer to:

- 47th Academy Awards, the Academy Awards ceremony that took place in 1975
- 48th Academy Awards, the 1976 ceremony honoring the best in film for 1975
