= Space City =

Space City or space city may refer to:

- Space City (newspaper), an underground newspaper published in Houston from 1969 to 1972
- Space City USA, a defunct theme park near Huntsville, Alabama
- Houston, Texas or Space City
- Cape Canaveral, Florida or Space City
- Titusville, Florida or Space City
- Leicester, UK or Space City
- Space settlement, a space station intended to provide a permanent home for a large population
- Space City, a complex under construction to house the Egyptian Space Agency
- Space City, an Advertising Studio in London

== See also ==
- Space City Kicks
- Space City Sigma
- 1971 Space City 300
