= David H. Moriarty =

American sound engineer (1911–1989)

- Born: David Henry Moriarty; August 19, 1911; Nebraska, U.S.
- Died: September 16, 1989 (aged 78); Los Angeles, California, U.S.
- Occupation: Sound engineer
- Years active: 1952–1974

David Henry Moriarty (August 19, 1911 – September 16, 1989) was an American sound engineer. He was nominated for an Academy Award in the category Best Sound for the film Airport.

Moriarty died on September 16, 1989, in Los Angeles, California, at the age of 78.

== Selected filmography ==
- Airport (1970; co-nominated with Ronald Pierce)
