= Robert R. Bertrand =

American sound engineer

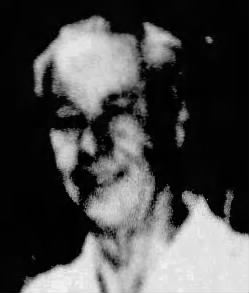
- Bertrand in 1974
- Born: February 12, 1906
- Died: May 4, 2002 (aged 96); Wildomar, California, U.S.
- Occupation: Sound engineer

Robert R. Bertrand (February 12, 1906 – May 4, 2002) was an American sound engineer. He was nominated for an Academy Award in the category Best Sound for the film The Sting.

Bertrand worked in the film industry for some forty years prior to his retirement in the mid-1970s. He served as the sound engineer for the TV series, Marcus Welby, M.D. for three years, and "for many other top productions".

== Selected filmography ==
- The Sting (1973; co-nominated with Ronald K. Pierce)
