= Frank Brendel =

American special effects artist (1914–1992)

- Born: November 24, 1914; Mississippi, U.S.
- Died: June 20, 1992 (aged 77); San Diego, California, U.S.
- Occupation: Special effects artist

Frank Brendel (November 24, 1914 – June 20, 1992) was an American special effects artist. He won a Special Achievement Academy Award in the category Best Visual Effects for the film Earthquake.

== Selected filmography ==
- Earthquake (1974; co-won the Special Achievement Academy Award with Glen Robinson and Albert Whitlock)
