= Frank Warner (sound editor) =

American sound editor (1926–2011)

- Born: Frank Edward Warner; March 27, 1926; Los Angeles, California, US
- Died: August 31, 2011 (aged 85); Sedona, Arizona, US
- Other name: Frank E. Warner
- Occupation: Sound editor
- Years active: 1960–1988

Frank Warner (March 27, 1926 – August 31, 2011) was an American sound editor. He received the Special Achievement Academy Award during the 50th Academy Awards for the film Close Encounters of the Third Kind. This was for the Sound Editing of the film.

== Selected filmography ==
- Rocky IV (1986)
- The King of Comedy (1982)
- Rocky III (1982)
- Raging Bull (1980)
- Rocky II (1978)
- Close Encounters of the Third Kind (1977)
- Bound for Glory (1976)
- Murder by Death (1976)
- Taxi Driver (1976)
- The Trial of Billy Jack (1974)
- Jonathan Livingston Seagull (1973)
- Paper Moon (1973)
- Kotch (1971)
- The Hawaiians (1970)
- Little Big Man (1970)
- They Call Me Mister Tibbs! (1970)
- The Scalphunters (1968)
