= Carlo Rambaldi =

Italian special effects artist (1925–2012)

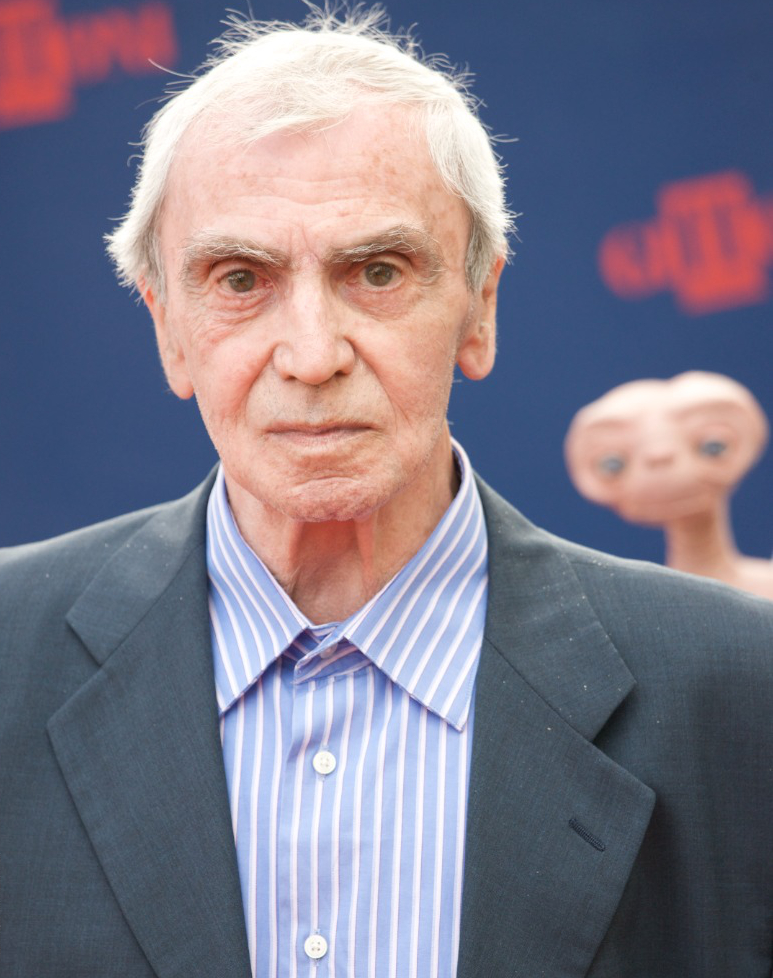
- Carlo Rambaldi in 2010
- Born: September 15, 1925; Vigarano Mainarda, Emilia-Romagna, Italy
- Died: August 10, 2012 (aged 86); Lamezia Terme, Calabria, Italy
- Citizenship: Italy
- Education: Academy of Fine Arts of Bologna
- Occupations: Special effects artist, makeup artist
- Years active: 1963–2006
- Notable work: King Kong (1976); Close Encounters of the Third Kind (1977); Alien (1979); E.T. the Extra-Terrestrial (1982)
- Spouse: Bruna Basso
- Children: Vittorio; Daniela
- Awards: 3 Oscars; Academy Awards Special Achievement Award; Saturn Award; BAFTA Film Award (nominated); David di Donatello Special; Los Angeles Film Critics Association Special; Los Angeles Italian Film Awards Outstanding Achievement Award; Mystfest Special; Razzie Award (nominated)

Carlo Rambaldi (September 15, 1925 – August 10, 2012) was an Italian special effects and makeup effects artist. He was the winner of three Academy Awards: one Special Achievement Academy Award for Best Visual Effects in 1977 for the 1976 version of King Kong and two Academy Awards for Best Visual Effects in 1980 and 1983 for, respectively, Alien (1979) and E.T. the Extra-Terrestrial (1982). He is most famous for his work in those two last mentioned films, that is for the mechanical head-effects for the creature in Alien and the design of the title character of E.T. the Extra-Terrestrial. In 2017, he was inducted into the Visual Effects Society Hall of Fame, and in 2026, he was honored with a star on the Hollywood Walk of Fame.

== Early life ==
Carlo Rambaldi was born September 15, 1925, in Vigarano Mainarda, Emilia-Romagna. He studied painting at the Accademia di Belle Arti di Bologna, where he developed a passion for electromechanics and the skeleton and musculature of the human body. He was heavily influenced by the work of Picasso and the Italian artist Renato Guttuso.

== Career ==
Rambaldi's first work in film was creating a fire-breathing dragon for the 1957 Italian picture Sigfrido (titled in the English version as The Dragon's Blood).

In 1963 he became a full-time special effects artist. He worked with Italian directors including Mario Bava, Federico Fellini, Pier Paolo Pasolini, Mario Monicelli and Dario Argento. Some films he worked on included Medusa vs the Son of Hercules (1962), Bloody Pit of Horror (1965), Planet of the Vampires (1965), Hercules and the Princess of Troy (1965), L'Odissea (1968, a TV miniseries), A Bay of Blood (1972), The Night of the Devils (1972), Andy Warhol's Frankenstein (1974), Andy Warhol's Dracula (1974), Deep Red (Profondo Rosso, 1975), King Kong (1976), Close Encounters of the Third Kind (1977), Alien (1979), Nightwing (1979), Possession (1981), E.T. the Extra-Terrestrial (1982), Dune (1984), Conan the Destroyer (1984), Silver Bullet (1985), Cat's Eye (1985), King Kong Lives (1986) and Cameron's Closet (1988), among others.

Rambaldi had the distinction of being the first special effects artist to be required to prove that his work on a film was not 'real'. Dog-mutilation scenes in the 1971 film A Lizard in a Woman's Skin were so convincingly visceral that its director, Lucio Fulci, was prosecuted for offenses relating to animal cruelty. Fulci would have served a two-year prison sentence, had Rambaldi not exhibited the film's array of props to a courtroom, proving that the scene was not filmed using real animals.

Rambaldi's last screen credit was on the 1988 horror film Primal Rage, directed by his son Vittorio. When computer-generated special effects became common place, Rambaldi complained, "Any kid with a computer can reproduce the special effects seen in today’s movies. The mystery's gone. The curiosity that viewers once felt when they saw special effects has disappeared. It's as if a magician had revealed all of his tricks... There’s no question that these computer films are well packaged but the charm has disappeared... If Spielberg were to film E.T. today using the latest technology I'm not sure it would be a hit because the techniques they’re using at the moment couldn't reproduce the tender expression of ET's eyes, for example. The secret of creating what technology is unable to express lies in the work of the artisan, who is able to develop characteristics that touch our deepest emotions."

== Personal life and death ==
Carlo Rambaldi married Bruna Basso, with whom he had a son, Vittorio, and a daughter, Daniela. Another son, Alessandro, died of a rare form of leukemia at 33 years of age.

Rambaldi died after a long illness on August 10, 2012, in Lamezia Terme, Calabria, where he had lived for the last decade of his life, after relocating to be near his daughter and grandchildren.

His ashes were laid to rest in the family tomb in Vigarano Mainarda, near his son Alessandro.

== Select filmography ==
Title	Year	Credited as		Notes	Ref(s)
Title	Year	Special effects	Other	Notes	Ref(s)
Dragon's Blood	1957	Yes		Dragon creator	
Goliath and the Dragon	1960		Yes	Special make-up effects	
The Giants of Thessaly	1960	Yes			
Fire Monsters Against the Son of Hercules	1962	Yes			
Medusa Against the Son of Hercules	1963	Yes			
Bloody Pit of Horror	1965	Yes			
Danger: Diabolik	1968		Yes	Set designer and mask maker	
Lady Frankenstein	1971	Yes			
The Night of the Devils	1972	Yes			
Frankenstein '80	1972	Yes			
Tragic Ceremony	1972	Yes			
Flesh for Frankenstein	1973	Yes			
The Hand That Feeds the Dead	1974	Yes			
Blood for Dracula	1974	Yes			
Deep Red	1975	Yes			
King Kong	1976	Yes		Kong design and engineering	
The White Buffalo	1977		Yes	Consultant on buffalo sequences	
Close Encounters of the Third Kind	1977	Yes		Realization of "extraterrestrial"	
Alien	1979	Yes		'Alien' head effect	
Nightwing	1979	Yes		Special visual effects	
The Hand	1981	Yes		Special visual effects	
Possession	1981	Yes			
E.T. the Extra-Terrestrial	1982	Yes		Creator of E.T.	
Conan the Destroyer	1984	Yes		Creator of Dagoth	
Dune	1984	Yes		Creature creator	
Cat's Eye	1985	Yes		Creature creator	
Silver Bullet	1985	Yes		Creature creator	

== Academy Awards ==
=== One Special Achievement Academy Award ===
- 1977 (49th): for Best Visual Effects for King Kong (1976), shared with Glen Robinson and Frank Van der Veer

=== Two Academy Awards for Best Visual Effects ===
- 1980 (52nd): for Best Visual Effects for Alien (1979), shared with H. R. Giger, Brian Johnson, Nick Allder, and Dennis Ayling
- 1983 (55th): for Best Visual Effects for E.T. the Extra-Terrestrial (1982), shared with Dennis Muren and Kenneth F. Smith

== Other awards ==
=== Los Angeles Film Critics Association Awards ===
- 1982: Special Award, "for the body of his work"

=== Saturn Awards ===
- 1983: for Best Special Effects for E.T. the Extra-Terrestrial (1982), shared with Dennis Muren

=== MystFest Awards ===
- 1985: Special Award, "for his whole activities" (Note: MystFest is the commonly used abbreviation for the "International Mystery Film Festival of Cattolica", in Italian "Festival internazionale del giallo e del mistero di Cattolica")

=== Los Angeles Italian Film Awards ===
- 2000: Outstanding Achievement Award for Best Special Effects

=== David di Donatello Awards ===
- 2002: Special David Award
