= Earthquake (1974 film) =

1974 American disaster film by Mark Robson

- Film poster by Joseph Smith
- Directed by: Mark Robson
- Written by: George Fox; Mario Puzo
- Produced by: Mark Robson
- Starring: Charlton Heston; Ava Gardner; George Kennedy; Lorne Greene; Geneviève Bujold; Richard Roundtree; Marjoe Gortner; Barry Sullivan; Lloyd Nolan; Victoria Principal
- Cinematography: Philip H. Lathrop
- Edited by: Dorothy Spencer
- Music by: John Williams
- Production company: The Filmakers Group
- Distributed by: Universal Pictures
- Release date: November 15, 1974
- Running time: 123 minutes (theatrical cut); 161 minutes (TV cut)
- Country: United States
- Language: English
- Budget: $6.6 million
- Box office: $167.4 million

Earthquake is a 1974 American disaster film directed and produced by Mark Robson, from a screenplay by George Fox and Mario Puzo. The plot concerns the struggle for survival after a catastrophic earthquake destroys most of Los Angeles. It stars an ensemble cast of well-known actors, including Charlton Heston, Ava Gardner, George Kennedy, Lorne Greene, Geneviève Bujold, Richard Roundtree, Marjoe Gortner, Barry Sullivan, Lloyd Nolan, Victoria Principal, Pedro Armendáriz Jr., and (under an alias) Walter Matthau.

The film was notable for the use of an innovative sound effect called Sensurround, which created the sense of actually experiencing an earthquake in theaters. Production made extensive use of miniatures, matte paintings, and modular full-size sets to simulate the earthquake sequences.

Earthquake was released by Universal Pictures on November 15, 1974. It received mixed reviews from critics, but was a blockbuster commercial success, grossing $167.4 million from a $6.6 million budget. At the 47th Academy Awards, the film received three nomination and won for Best Sound, as well as a Special Achievement Oscar for its special effects.

== Plot ==
Former college football star and current construction engineer Stewart Graff argues with his wife, Remy, after she fakes another suicide attempt which was interrupted by a mild earthquake in Los Angeles. Furious, Graff visits Denise Marshall, a part-time actress and widow of a colleague who died on a project Graff assigned him. Feeling obligated to help Denise and her 10-year-old son, Corry, Graff brings the boy an autographed football from his college days and helps Denise rehearse for an upcoming film.

Officer Lew Slade pursues a car thief but is intercepted by a rival deputy after crossing jurisdictional lines. The two, already enemies, clash, and Slade punches the deputy, resulting in his suspension.

At the California Seismological Institute (CSI), junior seismologist Walter Russell predicts a major earthquake within two days. Head seismologist Dr. Stockle and associate Dr. Johnson are initially skeptical of his assessment, but when they learn of the death of a fellow scientist conducting a field experiment during one of the earlier tremors they are convinced and notify the mayor. Concerned about political repercussions, the mayor alerts only the National Guard and police.

Motorcycle daredevil Miles Quade sets up a dangerous stunt track with his manager, Sal Amici, hoping to impress a Las Vegas promoter. Sal's sister, Rosa, fears for Miles’ safety and refuses to promote the stunt. Meanwhile, grocery store manager Jody Joad, attracted to Rosa, prepares for National Guard duty but endures harassment from his housemates for displaying posters of male bodybuilders.

A small tremor cancels Denise's film shoot, leading her to meet her friend Barbara at Graff's engineering firm. Denise and Graff cross paths and return to her home, where they have sex for the first time. Graff asks Denise to join him in Oregon that summer with Corry while he works on a hydroelectric dam project.

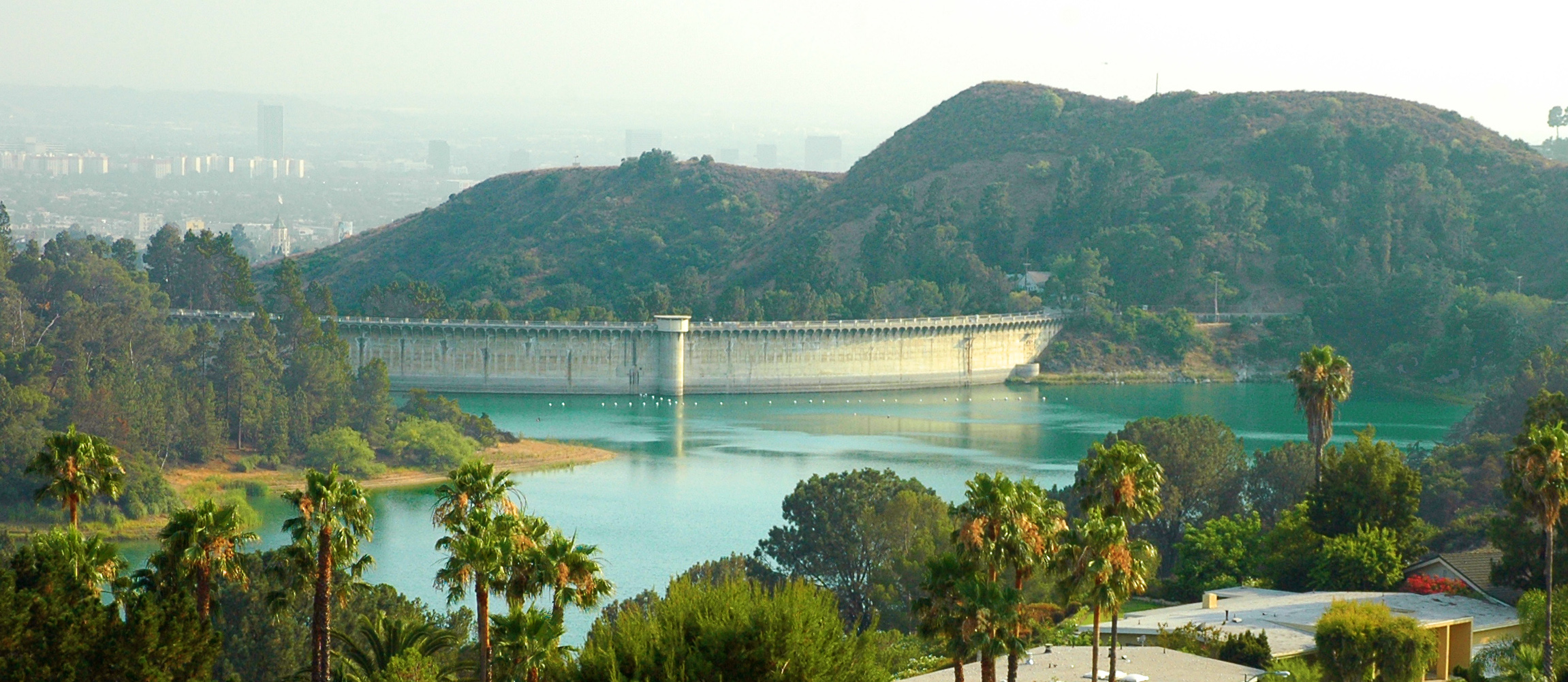
The simulated collapse of Mulholland Dam – and the subsequent deluge – forms the film's climax.

Later, Graff's boss and father-in-law, Sam Royce, offers him the company presidency. Graff, conflicted between the promotion and his relationship with Denise, accepts the offer, but then discovers Remy convinced Sam to make the offer in exchange for ending his relationship with Denise and saving their marriage. Enraged, Graff admits to the affair and ends their marriage.

A 9.9 earthquake devastates Los Angeles, trapping Sam and others in a skyscraper. Sam helps his staff escape using a firehose but suffers a heart attack. Graff rescues him and takes him to safety.

Corry is thrown from a collapsing footbridge into the Los Angeles River, becoming entangled in live cables. Denise rescues him but becomes trapped. Miles and Sal arrive in a truck, saving them and meeting Slade, who commandeers the vehicle to transport the injured. Miles uses his motorcycle to search for Rosa.

Rosa is mistakenly arrested for looting by Jody's National Guard unit. Jody isolates her under false pretenses and later murders his housemates, thus using the chaos as cover for personal revenge. Graff, transporting co-workers, drops off Remy, Barbara, and Sam at Wilson Plaza, but Sam dies despite medical aid. Graff departs to find Denise and Corry.

Slade commandeers Graff's car to transport the injured but struggles with the manual transmission, forcing Graff to drive. They encounter Jody's unit blocking the road. Rosa escapes the store, screaming for help, prompting Slade to return on foot. Slade kills Jody, saving Rosa.

An aftershock destroys Wilson Plaza before Graff and Slade arrive. Graff learns survivors, including Remy, Denise, and Corry, are trapped in the underground garage. Ignoring advice, Graff and Slade drill through to rescue them. The Mulholland Dam collapses, thus flooding the area. Denise, Corry, and Dr. Vance escape, but Remy falls into the torrent. Graff dives after her, and both are swept away and drown.

Slade escapes and searches for Graff but finds no trace. Denise, grieving, reunites with Corry. Slade and Rosa survey the devastated city as stunned survivors wander through the ruins. Fires rage as Los Angeles smolders in the aftermath.

== Cast ==
- Charlton Heston as Stewart Graff
- Ava Gardner as Remy Royce-Graff
- George Kennedy as Sergeant Lew Slade
- Lorne Greene as Sam Royce
- Geneviève Bujold as Denise Marshall
- Richard Roundtree as Miles Quade
- Marjoe Gortner as Jody Joad
- Barry Sullivan as Dr. Willis Stockle
- Lloyd Nolan as Dr. James Vance
- Victoria Principal as Rosa Amici
- Walter Matthau as Drunk
- Monica Lewis as Barbara
- Gabriel Dell as Sal Amici
- Pedro Armendáriz Jr. as Officer Emilio Chavez
- Lloyd Gough as Bill Cameron
- John Randolph as Mayor Lewis
- Kip Niven as Walter Russell
- Scott Hylands as Max, Hollywood Reservoir Dam Assistant Caretaker
- Eugene Dynarski as Fred, Hollywood Reservoir Dam Caretaker
- Tiger Williams as Corry Marshall
- Donald Moffat as Dr. Harvey Johnson
- Jesse Vint as Buck, Jody's Roommate
- Alan Vint as Ralph, Jody's Roommate
- Michael Richardson as Sandy, Jody's Roommate
- John Elerick as Carl Leeds
- John S. Ragin as Chief Inspector L.A. Dept. of Water & Power
- George Murdock as Colonel Tom Bronson, Military Civil Engineer

=== Extended television version only ===
- Debralee Scott as Kathie
- Sam Chew as Tony
- Joan Blair as Pawnbroker's Wife
- Reb Brown as "Boy on Motorcycle"
- Frank Parker as Pilot
- Clint Ritchie as Co-Pilot
- Jack Frey as Controller

== Pre-production ==
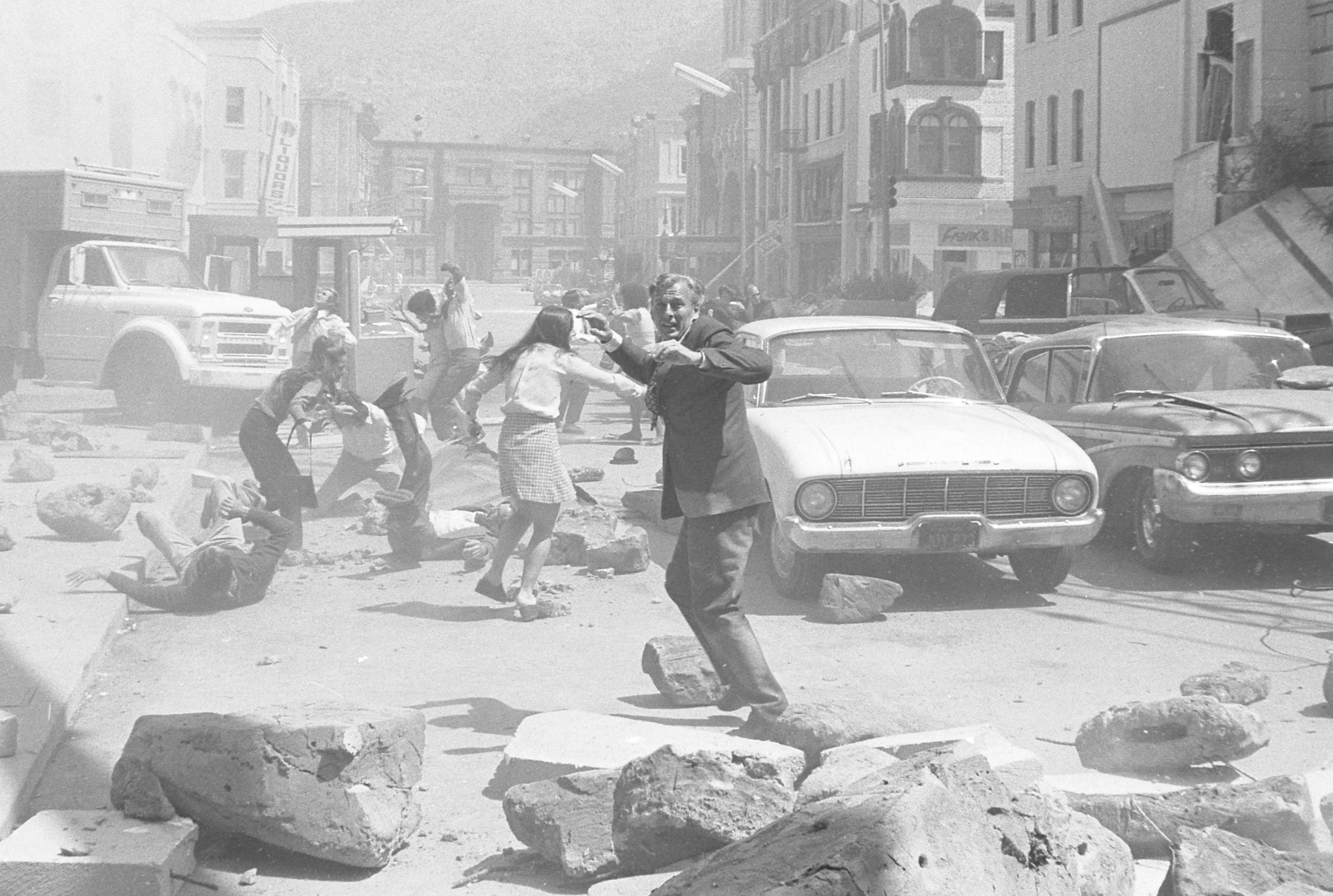
Actors during the filming of Earthquake in 1974.

=== Inception ===
In the wake of the tremendous success of the 1970 disaster-suspense film Airport, Universal Studios began working with executive producer Bernard Donnenfeld and director John Sturges to come up with a new idea that would work within the same "disaster-suspense" genre. Inspiration came in the form of the San Fernando earthquake of February 1971. Universal was intrigued by the idea of creating a disaster on film that would not be confined to an airliner, but rather take place over a large area.

Donnenfeld and Sturges left the project early in 1972, and Universal executive producer Jennings Lang took over development, bringing Mark Robson aboard as producer and director.

=== Writing and development ===
Lang scored a coup when he was able to sign screenwriter Mario Puzo, who was paid $125,000 to write the first draft during the summer of 1972. Puzo, fresh from the success of his novel and film, The Godfather, delivered the draft script in August. However, Puzo's detailed and expansive script would have necessitated a larger production budget, as the action and multiple story arcs were spread over a vast geographical area in Los Angeles. Universal was faced with either cutting the script or increasing the projected budget. Puzo's involvement with Earthquake was short-lived, as Paramount Pictures was anxious to begin development with the followup to The Godfather, The Godfather Part II in early 1973. Because Puzo's services contractually were obligated to the sequel, he was unable to continue any further work on Earthquake.

The Earthquake script sat at Universal Studios for a short period, but was brought back to life by the huge success of the 20th Century Fox hit The Poseidon Adventure, released in December 1972. Fueled by that film's enormous box-office receipts, Universal Studios put pre-production on Earthquake back into high gear, hiring writer George Fox to continue work with Puzo's first draft. Fox was principally a magazine writer and never had written a screenplay, so director Mark Robson worked with him to narrow the scope of the script to fit into the budgetary constraints. After 11 drafts, Earthquake went before the cameras in February 1974. Since Robson was also tasked with producing such a technically complex film, Bernard Donnenfeld was brought back to co-produce, but was uncredited.

Budgeted at US$6,675,125, Earthquake immediately found itself in a race against the clock with the bigger-budgeted disaster film, The Towering Inferno, which was being produced by Irwin Allen and financed, for the first time, by two studios (20th Century Fox and Warner Bros.).

=== Casting ===
While The Towering Inferno featured a larger "all star" cast, Universal was able to land Charlton Heston in the lead role for the sum of $600,000, plus a percentage of the profits. Rounding out the top billing were Ava Gardner (who co-starred with Heston in 1963's 55 Days at Peking), George Kennedy, Lorne Greene, and Geneviève Bujold. Richard Roundtree (riding a wave of success from the Shaft film series) was brought in after filming had already started, filling the part of an Evel Knievel-like motorcycle stuntman. Former evangelical preacher Marjoe Gortner was hired as the antagonist, Jody. Relative unknown Victoria Principal was hired to play the sister of Roundtree's business partner, Sal, played by veteran actor Gabriel Dell.

Walter Matthau was cast in a cameo role, for which he was credited as "Walter Matuschanskayasky". Executive Producer Jennings Lang, who had worked with Matthau on the previous year's Charley Varrick, was able to convince him to appear in the role (originally to be filled by veteran actor Harry Morgan). The unpaid cameo - and his credited name - were part of the deal. (Note: Matthau himself invented the name "Matuschanskayasky" as well as the fiction that it was his birth name.)

== Production ==
=== Set design ===
Production necessitated the complete re-dressing of the entire Universal Studios "New York Street" backlot in order to simulate the catastrophic earthquake of the title. Along with a clever use of miniatures of actual buildings, matte paintings, and full-scale sets (some of which were placed on rollers for a shaking effect), Earthquake used a new technique developed especially for the film: a "shaker mount" camera system that mimicked the effects of an earthquake by moving the entire camera body several inches side to side, versus simple shaking the camera on a stationary tripod, for a more realistic motion. This camera mount was used for most exterior scenes or other instances when shooting on location.

=== Stunts ===
Extensive use of highly trained stunt artists for the most dangerous scenes involving high falls, dodging falling debris, and flood sequences, set a Hollywood record for the most stunt artists involved in any film production up until that time: 141. Major stunt sequences in the film required careful choreography between the stunt artists and behind-the-scenes stunt technicians who were responsible for triggering full-scale effects, such as falling debris. Timing was critical, since some rigged effects involved dropping six-ton chunks of reinforced concrete in order to flatten cars, with stunt performers only a few feet away. In other scenarios, some stunt artists were required to fall 60 feet (18 m) onto large air bags from the rafters of Universal's largest stage (Stage 12) – for which they were paid the sum of $500. While every precaution was taken to prevent injuries, several did occur during filming. One stunt person suffered a concussion during the flood sequence (the accident was used in the film), and several stunt artists were injured during the elevator crash scene, since the set was designed to collapse upon them. Multiple stunt artists were injured during a scene involving an escalator as well.

=== The elevator scene ===
A scene involving an elevator loaded with passengers plummeting 25 floors to the ground during the earthquake is one of the film's more notorious sequences, mainly for how its conclusion was depicted. As originally scripted, the occupants were pressed to the ceiling of the elevator as it fell down the shaft, and then dropped to the floor when the elevator crashes to the bottom. To film this, an elevator set was built suspended several feet over the stage floor, allowing for the dropping of the set (with the stunt people inside). The scene was filmed several times, with several stunt people involved. Copious amounts of stage blood were rigged to spray the stunt people inside the elevator set with blood when the set came crashing to the ground. After several tries over two separate filming days weeks apart (the break in filming was an attempt to perfect the mechanical effects involved), and with unsatisfactory results, the decision was made to edit the scene with an "animated blood" effect to be added in post production. The optical effect was superimposed over a still frame of part of the unusable footage, resulting in the "cartoonish" nature of the shot. The television version removed the animated blood sequence.

== Post-production ==
=== "Sensurround" ===
Universal Studios and Jennings Lang wanted Earthquake to be an "event film", something that would draw audiences into the theatre multiple times. After several ideas were tossed about (which included bouncing styrofoam faux "debris" over audience members' heads), Universal's sound department came up with a process called "Sensurround" – a series of large speakers made by Cerwin-Vega powered by BGW amplifiers, that would pump in sub-audible "infra bass" sound waves at 120 decibels (equivalent to a jet airplane at takeoff), giving the viewer the sensation of an earthquake. The process was tested in several theatres around the United States prior to the film's release, yielding various results. A famous example is Grauman's Chinese Theatre in Hollywood, California, where the "Sensurround" cracked the plaster in the ceiling. The same theatre premiered Earthquake three months later – with a newly installed net over the audience to catch any falling debris – to tremendous success.

Sensurround was used again for the films Midway (1976), Rollercoaster (1977), and Battlestar Galactica (1979).

The 2006 Universal Studios Home Entertainment DVD release features the original "Sensurround" 3.1 audio track, duplicating the original theatrical "Sensurround" track (but oddly in mono directed to the front 3 speakers rather than the original stereo mix), but no actual 'rumble' generator was used, and only the two control tones that activated the generator can be heard. In addition, the film's original soundtrack was remixed in Surround Sound 5.1 which was simply a tag as once again only the control tones feature on the track.

=== Music ===
John Williams' music for Earthquake was the second of his trio of scores for large-scale disaster films, having previously scored The Poseidon Adventure and following with The Towering Inferno. Williams scored Earthquake and The Towering Inferno during the summer of 1974, with both scores showing similarities to one another (notably Earthquake's theme and The Towering Inferno's love theme sharing the same eight-note melody, albeit in different keys). The music of the song "C'est si bon" by Henri Betti is played on the guitar in the middle of the film.

On December 10, 2019, La-La Land Records released a fully remastered and expanded version of Williams' music, as part of the Disaster Movie Soundtrack Collection, which includes the remastered expansions of Williams's music for this film, as well as The Towering Inferno and The Poseidon Adventure.

=== Audience preview and re-edits ===
After an October 2, 1974 test screening in Joplin, Missouri, Universal opted to cut 30 minutes from the film, notably from the pre-quake sequences, at the cost of some of the dramatic flow. This included a narration sequence about the San Andreas fault and an impending catastrophic earthquake that would occur in either Los Angeles or San Francisco. This scene was filmed and was set to be shown before the opening title credits (although it was removed at the last minute, it was eventually included as the opening sequence of the NBC television edit for the September, 1976 broadcast premiere). Also excised were lengthy scenes of Remy and Graff arguing at the beginning of the film. After Remy's faked suicide attempt, Dr. Vance (Lloyd Nolan) inadvertently informs his old friend Graff that Remy had an abortion two years prior (he was told it was a miscarriage). Angered because he wanted children, Graff storms off. There was more of Slade's leaving the police station, and footage of Rosa's leaving the market was shot as well. She was filmed waiting for a bus and being offered a lift from a man on a motorcycle (this footage eventually was used in the film's television cut). Just before the earthquake, Stewart and Remy had a final fight (in front of Stewart's car) that was deleted as well. During the earthquake, there was a scene of a nearby lumberyard falling apart, and this was removed from the final cut.

Other scenes were shot to wrap up many characters' stories after the earthquake, but were deleted from the final print: Walt Russell and Dr. Stockle – whose fates are undetermined after the quake in the theatrical release – were shown alive in the seismology laboratory post-quake. They were shown finding the earthquake's magnitude to be 9.9 on the Richter scale. The film's final scene was significantly re-edited, and originally showed Denise walking up to Lew Slade as he emerges from the manhole, and asks if Stewart had survived; upon hearing of his death, she walks over to Corry who has regained consciousness.

== Scientific accuracy ==
The purported magnitude of the earthquake in the film (9.9 on the Richter Scale) would make it the largest ever recorded, eclipsing the record set by the actual Chilean Earthquake of 1960 (9.5 on the Richter Scale). However, such huge earthquakes can only be generated by "megathrust" faults or asteroid strikes. The numerous faults in California, particularly the San Andreas (the fault implied to have generated the titular earthquake in the film), are the "strike-slip" type, which historically have rarely produced tremors higher than 8.3 on the Richter Scale. [The San Francisco earthquake of 1906 has had estimates between 7.9 and 8.3.]

== Reception ==
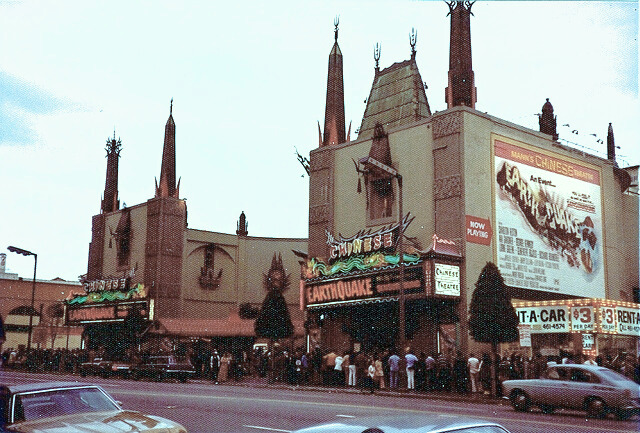
First movie release at Grauman's Chinese Theatre

Released in the United States on November 15, 1974, Earthquake ranked third among the high-grossing films of the year; The Towering Inferno was the highest.

=== Box office ===
Earthquake grossed $1,306,271 in its opening weekend from 62 theatres in 51 cities in the United States and Canada. It eventually grossed $79.7 million in the United States and Canada ($450.5 million, adjusted for inflation in 2023 dollars) being one of the highest-grossing films of the time. Internationally, it grossed $87.7 million, including ¥3 billion ($10 million) in Japan, bringing its worldwide gross to $167.4 million.

=== Critical response ===
At its release, critics generally acknowledged the special effects in Earthquake while discounting other aspects. Without either panning or praising the film, Nora Sayre of the New York Times wrote that it was an improvement on Airport 1975 and observed, "The impulse to shout advice to the screen—get out! go away! don't enter that building—is quite powerful, so this does rank as a participatory movie." Judith Crist wrote in New York Magazine that "the nonsense is bearable for the spectacle. And ... here we have a feast of feats of destruction." Pauline Kael wrote "The picture is swill, but it isn't a cheat; it's an entertaining marathon of Grade-A destruction effects". Roger Ebert criticized the "witless Earthquake" for "regarding [the effects] with awe". Gene Siskel gave the film two-and-a-half stars out of four and wrote the special effects were "terrific" but identified a basic problem with the story: "With a Poseidon Adventure or an Airport the ending is clear – people are saved ultimately thru their own or somebody else's enterprise. But with an earthquake, the final solution is out of one's hands, anyone's hands – even Allstate's. If the tremors don't stop, then everybody'll die; if they do, then only a few people will die. End of story." Charles Champlin of the Los Angeles Times wrote that the Sensurround vibrations "succeed very nicely in making themselves felt as well as heard and they set up an anxiety which makes watching Earthquake a very ambivalent experience for anyone who, so to speak, has been there before." Gary Arnold of The Washington Post wrote "Thanks to Sensurround, Earthquake figures to be the gimmick hit of 1974. Without the gimmick, it would be difficult to distinguish this perfunctory, mediocre piece of storytelling from Universal's other disaster vehicle, Airport 1975."

On review aggregator Rotten Tomatoes the film holds an approval rating of 41% from 34 reviews. The website's critical consensus reads: "The destruction of Los Angeles is always a welcome sight, but Earthquake offers little besides big actors slumming through crumbling sets." Metacritic, who uses a weighted average, has assigned the film a score of 56/100 based on 6 critic reviews, indicating "mixed or average reviews". Film critic Leonard Maltin in his Movie Guide gave the film a "BOMB" rating, stating "[the] title tells the story in hackneyed disaster epic ... Marjoe as a sex deviate and Gardner as Lorne Greene's daughter tie for film's top casting honors." Gardner was only 8 years younger than Lorne Greene.

=== Accolades ===
Earthquake became a blockbuster success and was nominated for four Academy Awards (winning one) and receiving a Special Achievement Academy Award for Visual Effects.

Award	Year	Category	Nominee(s)	Result	Ref.
Academy Award	1974	Best Art Direction	Art Direction: Alexander Golitzen, E. Preston Ames; Set Decoration: Frank R. McKelvy	Nominated	
Academy Award	1974	Best Cinematography	Philip H. Lathrop	Nominated	
Academy Award	1974	Best Film Editing	Dorothy Spencer	Nominated	
Academy Award	1974	Best Sound	Ronald Pierce, Melvin Metcalfe Sr.	Won	
Academy Award	1974	Special Achievement Award (for visual effects)	Frank Brendel, Glen Robinson, Albert Whitlock	Won	
American Cinema Editors Award	1975	Best Edited Feature Film	Dorothy Spencer	Nominated	
British Academy Film Award	1975	Best Soundtrack	Ronald Pierce, Melvin Metcalfe Sr.	Nominated	
Golden Globe Award	1975	Best Motion Picture – Drama		Nominated	
Golden Globe Award	1975	Best Original Score – Motion Picture	John Williams	Nominated	
National Board of Review Award	1974	Outstanding Special Effects		Won	

The film is recognized by American Film Institute in these lists:

- 2001: AFI's 100 Years...100 Thrills – Nominated

== Television version ==
For the film's television premiere on Sunday, September 26, 1976, on NBC, additional footage was added to expand the film's running time so it could be aired over two nights, as part of NBC's promotion of "The Big Event" fall premiere series (the second night aired on Sunday, October 3, 1976).

According to internal memos from Universal Studios, both Jennings Lang and Mark Robson were upset that Universal and NBC had agreed to alter the original film for its premiere broadcast, with Robson initially refusing to participate (but eventually relenting to be a "consultant" to the editing process). Editor Gene Palmer was hired to direct the additional footage, with a script provided by an uncredited Francesca Turner. Robson petitioned the Directors Guild of America that it be specified he was the director of the "theatrical version only" (which was granted).

While inserting approximately 30 minutes of unused footage shot for the theatrical version was considered, this "television version" made virtually no use of material edited out of the theatrical release (save the introductory sequence describing earthquakes in California on the San Andreas Fault, and one brief scene featuring Victoria Principal and Reb Brown), but rather incorporated new footage filmed nearly two years after the original using two of the original film's stars, Marjoe Gortner and Victoria Principal, as well as Jesse Vint and Michael Richardson (reprising their film roles of Marjoe Gortner's taunting roommates), expanding on the original storyline from the theatrical film. Editing and re-recorded dialogue helped integrate this expansion into the original film. A short scene involving Richard Roundtree's character, Miles Quade, was scripted, but never filmed. An entirely new storyline shot specifically for the television version was that of a young married couple (Debralee Scott and Sam Chew) flying to Los Angeles on an airplane. The husband seeks a job with the Royce Construction company of the film (in fact, hoping to work with Charlton Heston's character, Stewart Graff), while his wife has the eerily accurate ability to see the future with tarot cards. Their airliner attempts to land at Los Angeles International Airport as the titular earthquake hits, and the airliner makes a touch-and-go landing on a runway that is breaking up, diverting to San Francisco. Throughout the remainder of the television version, the film cuts back to the couple as they discuss their future together, and the husband's wish to return to Los Angeles and help rebuild the city.

The "Sensurround" audio of the original film was simulcast in FM stereo in the Los Angeles and New York markets. This theoretically allowed the home viewer (with the properly equipped sound system) to experience a similar effect as in the theater.

== Theme park attractions ==
Earthquake inspired the attractions Earthquake: The Big One at Universal Studios Florida and Hollywood.

The Hollywood attraction opened in March 1989 as part of the Studio Tour tram ride. The tram enters a sound stage, the interior designed to look like a San Francisco underground BART station, whereupon a two-and-a-half-minute simulation of an 8.3 earthquake takes place, featuring a gas truck falling into the station, a runaway train and a flood. (Note: The San Francisco and BART setting was meant to reflect the setting of the Earthquake sequel that never materialized.)

The Florida attraction opened in June 1990. It began with an introductory film on the making of Earthquake with Charlton Heston appearing to explain the special effects, followed by a live demonstration based on the film with audience participation. The attraction culminated in a simulated 8.3 earthquake aboard an underground train at Embarcadero Station in San Francisco. In the fall of 2002, the pre-show was changed to a more generic "magic of making movies" theme, with slight modifications which included mentioning special effects used in other films besides Earthquake. The Florida attraction officially closed on November 5, 2007, and reopened several months later as "Disaster!: A Major Motion Picture Ride...Starring You!."

== Novelization ==
A novelization of the book credited to George Fox was published by New American Library as part of the Signet Film Series.

== See also ==
- List of American films of 1974
