= The Hurricane (novel) =

Book by James Norman Hall

- First edition (publ. Little Brown)
- Author: Charles Nordhoff, James Norman Hall
- Language: English
- Publisher: Little Brown
- Publication date: 1936
- OCLC: 807690

The Hurricane is a 1936 novel by Charles Nordhoff and James Norman Hall about a Pacific Ocean hurricane.

== Adaptations ==
The novel was adapted into two films, The Hurricane (1937), directed by John Ford, and Hurricane (1979), by Swedish director Jan Troell.

The Hurricane was adapted for the CBS Radio series The Campbell Playhouse. Broadcast November 5, 1939, the episode featured Orson Welles (Eugene de Laage), Mary Astor (Germaine de Laage), Ray Collins (Father Paul), Everett Sloane (Captain Nagle), Edgar Barrier (Terangi), Bea Benaderet (Marani), Eric Burgess (Mako), George Coulouris, William Alland and Richard Wilson.

In the mid-1950s it was published in comic-book format as issue 120 of the Classics Illustrated series.
