= Melvin Metcalfe Sr. =

American sound engineer

- Born: November 1, 1911; New York, U.S.
- Died: May 11, 1977 (aged 65); Los Angeles, California, U.S.
- Occupation: Sound engineer
- Years active: 1951-1977

Melvin Metcalfe Sr. (November 1, 1911 – May 11, 1977) was an American sound engineer. He won an Oscar for Best Sound for the film Earthquake.

== Selected filmography ==
- Earthquake (1974; co-won with Ronald Pierce)
