= The Hurricane (1937 film) =

1937 film by John Ford

- Theatrical poster
- Directed by: John Ford
- Written by: Dudley Nichols; Oliver H.P. Garrett
- Based on: The Hurricane (novel) by James Norman Hall and Charles Nordhoff
- Produced by: Samuel Goldwyn
- Starring: Dorothy Lamour; Jon Hall; Mary Astor; C. Aubrey Smith; Thomas Mitchell; Raymond Massey; John Carradine; Jerome Cowan
- Cinematography: Bert Glennon
- Edited by: Lloyd Nosler
- Music by: Alfred Newman
- Production company: Samuel Goldwyn Productions
- Distributed by: United Artists
- Release date: November 9, 1937
- Running time: 110 minutes
- Country: United States
- Language: English
- Budget: $2 million (estimated)
- Box office: $3.2 million (U.S. and Canada rentals)

The Hurricane is a 1937 American drama film set in the South Seas, directed by John Ford and produced by Samuel Goldwyn Productions, about a Polynesian who is unjustly imprisoned. The climax features a "hurricane" generated through special effects. It stars Dorothy Lamour and Jon Hall, with Mary Astor, C. Aubrey Smith, Thomas Mitchell, Raymond Massey, John Carradine, and Jerome Cowan. James Norman Hall, Jon Hall's uncle, co-wrote the novel of the same name on which The Hurricane is based.

The movie was filmed in Pago Pago, American Samoa.

== Plot ==
As a passenger ship sails by the bleak ruins of a deserted island, Dr. Kersaint blows his former home a kiss. When a fellow passenger asks him about the place, he tells its tragic story, segueing into a flashback.

During the colonial era in the South Pacific, the natives of the island of Manakoora are a contented lot. Terangi, the first mate on an island-hopping schooner, marries Marama, the daughter of the chief. She has a premonition and begs him not to leave, or at least take her with him on the ship's next voyage, but he makes her stay behind.

Upon reaching Tahiti, the crew goes to a bar to celebrate. When a racist white man orders them to leave, Terangi strikes him and breaks his jaw. Unfortunately, the man has strong political connections, and the governor is forced to sentence him to six months in jail, over the objections of Terangi's captain, Nagle. Back on Manakoora, Dr. Kersaint begs recently appointed local French Governor Eugene De Laage to have Terangi brought home to serve his sentence under parole, but De Laage refuses to compromise his stern interpretation of the law, despite the pleas of Captain Nagle, Father Paul, and even his own wife.

Unable to bear being confined, Terangi repeatedly tries to escape, eventually lengthening his sentence to sixteen years, much to the delight of a particularly harsh jailer. Finally, after eight years, Terangi succeeds in escaping, but unintentionally kills a guard. He steals a canoe and returns to Manakoora after an arduous journey. At the end, he is rescued from his overturned canoe by Father Paul, who promises to remain silent.

Terangi is reunited with Marama and a daughter he has never seen before. Chief Mehevi recommends the family hide on a tabu island, where no one will look for them. However, De Laage discovers their preparations and commandeers the schooner to hunt them down.

Terangi turns back to warn his people after he sees birds fleeing the island, an unprecedented, ominous event that Marama had dreamed about many years before. A once-in-a-lifetime hurricane strikes the island. A few, among them Dr. Kersaint and his pregnant patient, weather the disaster in a canoe, while Terangi ties his family and Madame De Laage to a stout tree. The rest drown, and the island is stripped bare.

The tree floats away. Terangi later finds a war canoe in the water, which he uses to get his party to a small island. When they spot the schooner, Terangi signals it with smoke before fleeing in the canoe with his family. Governor De Laage embraces his wife, but then spots something on the water through his binoculars. Madame De Laage insists it must be a floating log; after a pause, her husband agrees with her.

== Cast ==
- Dorothy Lamour as Marama
- Jon Hall as Terangi
- Mary Astor as Madame Germaine De Laage
- C. Aubrey Smith as Father Paul
- Thomas Mitchell as Dr. Kersaint
- Raymond Massey as Governor Eugene De Laage
- John Carradine as Warden
- Jerome Cowan as Captain Nagle
- Al Kikume as Chief Mehevi
- Kuulei De Clercq as Tita
- Layne Tom Jr. as Mako
- Mamo Clark as Hitia
- Movita Castaneda as Arai

== Production ==
Actor Jon Hall had appeared in a number of roles under different names. He kept the name "Jon Hall" for the rest of his career.

== Awards and nominations ==
The film was nominated for three Academy Awards, winning in the category for Best Sound.

- Best Sound Recording - Thomas T. Moulton
- Best Supporting Actor (nomination) - Thomas Mitchell
- Best Music, Score (nomination) - Alfred Newman

== Critical reception ==
The New York Times critic Frank S. Nugent praised the climactic special effect created by James Basevi, stating, "It is a hurricane to blast you from the orchestra pit to the first mezzanine. It is a hurricane to film your eyes with spin-drift, to beat at your ears with its thunder, to clutch at your heart and send your diaphragm vaulting over your floating rib into the region just south of your tonsils." He complimented the performances of all of the principal actors with the exception of Hall, whose Terangi was described as "a competent Tarzan". Nugent also faulted the uneven pacing, but in the end, characterized the film as "one of the most thrilling spectacles the screen has provided this year."

In 2025, The Hollywood Reporter listed The Hurricane as having the best stunts of the year.

== Literary references ==
In his 1963 memoir La tregua ("The Truce"; re-titled The Reawakening for publication in the U.S.), Primo Levi recounted his experience watching The Hurricane among other films while he was interned at a Soviet transit camp at Starye Dorogi in the aftermath of World War II. The audience of Soviet troops, former prisoners of war, and Holocaust survivors (Levi included) became more and more unruly as the movie progressed, culminating in what Levi called a "Witches' Sabbath" when the actual hurricane appeared on screen. A fight broke out in the cramped theater, during which some of the troops attempted to climb poles to reach rooms occupied by women, adjacent to the balcony. Several of the Italians ran up the stairs to come to the women's defence, pushing the poles away from the balcony. Due to the frenzy, the projectionist decided to shut off the film before the end, to Levi's dismay (he recalled the film as "quite a good American film of the thirties").

== Remake ==
A remake of this movie was released in 1979, directed by Jan Troell and starring Jason Robards Jr. and Mia Farrow. The identically titled and themed 1974 made-for-TV film, Hurricane, has no connection to the 1937 production.

== Home media ==
The Hurricane was released on Blu-ray and DVD by Kino Lorber Studio Classics (under licensed from MGM & The Samuel Goldwyn Family Trustee) in November 2015.
