= Ronald Pierce (sound engineer) =

American sound engineer

- Born: Ronald K. Pierce; September 18, 1909
- Died: March 5, 2008 (aged 98); Fort Mohave, Arizona, U.S.
- Occupation: Sound engineer
- Years active: 1944–1975

Ronald K. Pierce (September 18, 1909 – March 5, 2008) was an American sound engineer. He won an Academy Award for Best Sound and was nominated for two more in the same category. He died in 2008 at the age of 98.

== Selected filmography ==
Pierce won an Academy Award and was nominated for two more:

Won

- Earthquake (1974; co-won with Melvin Metcalfe Sr.)

Nominated

- Airport (1970; co-nominated with David H. Moriarty)
- The Sting (1973; co-nominated with Robert R. Bertrand)
