= Space City USA =

Defunct planned theme park in Alabama

Coordinates: 34.665829°N 86.723893°W

logo from 1963 booklet

Space City USA was a planned theme park near Huntsville, Alabama. Located adjacent to Lady Ann Lake between Huntsville and Decatur, the $5 million (at the time) project was planned starting in 1959 as "Time World". Construction began in 1963 but the project was abandoned three years later, before the park could be opened. (The park property is now inside the Madison and Huntsville city limits.) Built around a space travel theme, popular at the time, theming also included "Lost World" with dinosaur models, a simulated moon colony, a "Land of Oz", and an Old South section.
