= Hurricane (1979 film) =

1979 film

- Theatrical movie poster
- Directed by: Jan Troell
- Screenplay by: Lorenzo Semple Jr.; Roman Polanski
- Based on: The Hurricane; 1936 novel by James Norman Hall and Charles Nordhoff
- Produced by: Dino De Laurentiis; Lorenzo Semple Jr. (executive producer)
- Starring: Jason Robards; Mia Farrow; Max von Sydow; Trevor Howard; Timothy Bottoms; James Keach; Dayton Ka'ne
- Cinematography: Sven Nykvist
- Edited by: Sam O'Steen
- Music by: Nino Rota
- Production company: Dino De Laurentiis Productions
- Distributed by: Paramount Pictures
- Release date: April 12, 1979
- Running time: 120 minutes
- Country: United States
- Language: English
- Budget: $22 million
- Box office: $4,541,000

Hurricane is a 1979 American romantic drama film featuring Mia Farrow and Jason Robards, produced by Dino De Laurentiis with Lorenzo Semple Jr. (who also wrote the screenplay), and directed by Jan Troell. It is a loose remake of John Ford's 1937 film The Hurricane, itself based on the 1936 novel by James Norman Hall and Charles Nordhoff.

== Plot ==
In the 1920s Charlotte, an American painter, arrives from Boston on the island of Alava to visit her father, U.S. Navy Captain Charles Bruckner, whom she hasn't seen in quite some time. Bruckner is the U.S. Congress-sanctioned governor of the island. He rules with a stern, patrician, and thoroughly patronizing attitude towards the natives. Charlotte is somewhat taken aback by her father's rigid adherence to the law. She tries to intervene on behalf of Bruckner's charge/houseboy Matangi, who plans to get Bruckner to toss out a harsh penalty issued to a native man who stole a boat "for love." Bruckner refuses, and severely reprimands Matangi, much to Charlotte's dismay.

Matangi is soon appointed the high chief of his island, Alava. Matangi isn't as willing to wholeheartedly accept the edicts of the U.S. forces, particularly if they go against the well-being of his own people. His stubbornness quietly enrages Bruckner.

Charlotte wants to stay for a month on the island, chaperoned by Dr. Danielsson and Father Malone, missionaries who reside on Alava. Despite Captain Bruckner's jealousy over his daughter's attraction to Matangi, he agrees to the stay and sails off for a month. Matangi and Charlotte quickly become lovers. When this is discovered by her father, he has Matangi arrested on a trumped-up charge. He escapes, with Charlotte's help.

Just as tensions are beginning to boil, disaster strikes in the form of a giant hurricane.

== Cast ==
- Jason Robards – Captain Charles Bruckner
- Mia Farrow – Charlotte Bruckner
- Max von Sydow – Dr. Danielsson
- Trevor Howard – Father Malone
- Timothy Bottoms – Jack Sanford
- James Keach – Sgt. Strang
- Dayton Ka'ne – Matangi
- Ariirau Tekurarere – Moana
- Bernadette Sarcione – Siva

== Production ==
=== Development ===
The film is based on a 1937 film The Hurricane, directed by John Ford. Dino De Laurentiis, who had just remade King Kong, was interested in doing more remakes and was shown the film by his associate, John Alarimo. "I saw it, I liked it", said the producer. "People like romance, adventure, escapism. This story gives them all of that. And we have to make it expensive because, cheap, it don't look so good."

He bought the rights and assigned Lorenzo Semple Jr., who had written King Kong, to do the script. It was part of a slate of seven films the producer would make worth $80 million (the others being Stormy Women, King of the Gypsies, The First Great Train Robbery, The Brink's Job, Flash Gordon and Ragtime). The Hurricane had a budget of $15 million and it was to be distributed by Paramount. The bulk of finance of Hurricane came from Dutch company Famous Films.

De Laurentiis wanted to shoot the film on location. "Today's audiences are not fooled by movies shot on the studio's back lot", he said. "They demand realism!" After considering the Bahamas and Hawaii, he decided to film it on Bora Bora.

=== Roman Polanski ===
In May 1977 De Laurentiis signed Roman Polanski to direct. Polanski had been arrested for sex with a 13-year-old girl in March. He was meant to go on trial on June 29 and filming was to begin in Tahiti in October. Polanski flew to Tahiti in May to commence pre-production.

Bora Bora was very isolated at the time. Sets and a giant tank for the hurricane scenes would need to be built, and electricity needed to be brought in. There were only two hotels. Hotel Bora Bora was booked up for three years, and the Club Med was only willing to hire its facilities for 100 days at a fee of $1 million (not including food).

De Laurentiis decided to build a new hotel from scratch, the Hotel Mara, at a cost of $3.5 million (other sources say $4.5 million). He intended to use it on this film and another project he was planning, David Lean's film of the Mutiny on the Bounty story (this became The Bounty (1984)), then sell it for a profit. He also decided to bring in his own $350,000 freighter to bring supplies from Los Angeles and New Zealand and installed a new system of electricity.

On August 8, Polanski pled guilty to the charge of unlawful sex with a minor. Judge Rittenband ordered the director to a psychiatric study as a prelude to sentencing. On September 19 the judge allowed Polanski a 90-day delay for this so he could work on The Hurricane, which was to now start in January 1978. Then the judge saw a newspaper photo of Polanski at Oktoberfest in Munich and, worried the director was on holiday, ordered a new hearing in October. The judge eventually decided to give Polanski the benefit of the doubt on his claim that Polanski had gone to Germany to talk to a distributor. He allowed him to continue to work on the film until December 19.

Polanski went to prison for 42 days of psychiatric tests. In January 1978 Polanski was fired as director of Hurricane, citing uncertainty as to his availability. He left prison in late January, and on February 1, flew to London, then to France, meaning he missed his sentencing. A warrant was issued for his arrest.

=== Jan Troell ===
In February 1978 De Laurentiis replaced Polanski with Jan Troell. The producer says Troell was the first choice anyway, but he had been too busy. "He give scope, sensitivity, quality", said De Laurentiis. Peter Bogdanovich later claimed he was offered $1 million to direct the film but turned it down. Similarly, Brian De Palma also claimed that he took a meeting with the producers to also helm the project, but later rejected the offer.

Lorenzo Semple had worked on the script with Polanski but got sole credit, saying "I don't think he [Polanski] wants it."

De Laurentiis wanted an unknown to play the female lead, like Jessica Lange was in King Kong. Lange herself was once mentioned. The producer said he looked at hundreds of girls. "If the right age the wrong face. If the right face then not in a position to act." Eventually Mia Farrow ("who has the face of an 18 year old") got the job. Unknown Hawaiian surfer Dayton Ka'ne was given the romantic male lead. He studied for several months with Jeff Corey.

By this stage the cost of the above-the-line talent was $4 million and the sets cost $2.5 million. Food insurance was $250,000 and De Laurentiis bought a plane for $1 million. The budget was $20 million.

=== Shooting ===
Filming began in May 1978, to enable cinematographer Sven Nykvist to finish on King of the Gypsies.

Filming was extremely difficult. The crew almost went on strike out of concerns for their safety.

The special effects for the hurricane were done by a team led by Glen Robinson, who also did special effects for the 1937 film.

Troell felt that this massive budget actually made directing the film a much more difficult and unpleasant experience. He later remarked that

... I think the more money, the less creative freedom you've got. Dino de Laurentiis is a very strong producer, and he knew what he wanted. I knew that from the start, but I didn't have a good time shooting the film, because I didn't think that I was doing a good job. I wanted to complicate the characters, make them more interesting, but when a movie costs so much, a producer says you have to appeal to a common denominator. Dino had, as his guiding light for that film, the taste of a big audience; sometimes he would touch his nose and say, 'I can smell it!' I like Dino in many ways, but it was difficult making that kind of movie for him. The characters got lost in the special effects.

Filming finished in November 1978. The difficulty of the experience led to De Laurentiis deciding to postpone the David Lean Bounty films. However he did decide to use the facilities for a cheap follow up with Ka'ne, Shark Boy of Bora Bora, which became Beyond the Reef.

The film was the final score of composer Nino Rota, who died two days before its premiere.

== Reception ==
Vincent Canby of The New York Times described the film as "the sort of expensively foolish enterprise that suggests that everyone connected with it needs either a new agent or a legal guardian." Todd McCarthy of Variety wrote, "The storm blows fiercely but the love story doesn't match its power ... it just doesn't take. To compensate for the romance's implausibility, some emotional history or psychological background was needed for Mia Farrow's character, which is never forthcoming." Gene Siskel of the Chicago Tribune gave the film 1.5 stars out of 4 and wrote, "It's shameful that more than $20 million may have been spent on this production. It doesn't look like it ... we wait and wait for the hurricane to hit, and when it does genuine disappointment strikes as well. We repeatedly see a cheap and obvious model of an island village. A shot of huge waves is repeated ad sea sickness, as is a shot of water rushing through the doorway of an island church. It's quite a letdown for a film that bills itself as a spectacular." His colleague, Roger Ebert, named it as the worst film of 1979, singling out the film's "bargain-basement sets" and describing it as "a dull 90-minute romance followed by a dull 30-minute rainstorm." Kevin Thomas of the Los Angeles Times called the film "a visually stunning romantic epic that's enjoyable but too old-fashioned to be as fully involving as one might wish." Gary Arnold of The Washington Post declared the film "a $20 million wreck. It also confirms producer Dino De Laurentiis as the movie world's least astute remaker of '30s classics. Compared to this Chinese firedrill, his superfluous 'King Kong' was at least an A Production." David Ansen of Newsweek wrote, "On a purely sensuous level, 'Hurricane' is frequently arresting—and sometimes downright sexy ... But it's a humorless, bubble-headed affair, as dramatically underfed as it is visually overripe."

The film holds a score of 38% on Rotten Tomatoes based on 8 reviews.

== Release ==
The film was aired on television as Forbidden Paradise. Legend Films, via their partnership with Paramount Home Entertainment, released the film on DVD on July 1, 2008.
