= Albert Whitlock =

British motion picture matte artist (1915–1999)

- Born: Albert J. Whitlock Jr. 15 September 1915; London, England
- Died: 26 October 1999 (aged 84); Santa Barbara, California, U.S.
- Occupation: Matte artist

Albert J. Whitlock Jr. (15 September 1915 – 26 October 1999) was a British-born motion picture matte artist best known for his work with Disney and Universal Studios.

== Life and career ==
Whitlock began his film career as a page at Gaumont Studios in London in 1929, before going on to build sets and work as a grip. Trained as a sign painter, he began an intermittent association with Alfred Hitchcock, assisting in the miniature effects for The Man Who Knew Too Much (1934) and then completing all of the signs for The 39 Steps (1935).

Whitlock began working as a matte artist during World War II. Recruited by Walt Disney, who admired his work, he relocated to the United States in the early 1950s. At Disney, where the head of the Matte Department was fellow-Londoner and near-exact contemporary Peter Ellenshaw, he successfully mastered the impressionistic approach to matte painting for which he would become known. He remained with the studio for seven years, helping with the design of Disneyland as well as film work, before moving to Universal in 1961. There he served as the head of their matte department, resuming his collaboration with Alfred Hitchcock and many other directors, until retiring from the company in 1985 (though he continued to work on the odd production for a few years afterwards).

His most substantial achievement was the creation of over 70 individual matte paintings for the disaster film Earthquake (1974), for which he received an Academy Award. He won the Oscar again the following year for The Hindenburg, in which he re-created the great airship and its final voyage. Universal loaned out Whitlock and his team to other studios for visual effects work on films including Greystoke: The Legend of Tarzan, Lord of the Apes, the David Lynch version of Dune, Mame, The Learning Tree and Bound for Glory. In the latter film, Whitlock created the famous Dust Storm with moving cotton-covered disks.

One of his last projects was John Carpenter's 1982 sci-fi film The Thing, where he reportedly painted all the shots of the uncovered alien starship, including both distant and close-up viewpoints. However, in 2020, Carpenter claimed that Whitlock had left his assistants in the art department to create the matte paintings, apparently because he disliked Carpenter personally. Carpenter claimed that Whitlock took credit for his assistants' work, and told Carpenter "I didn't take a brush to canvas."

In addition to his film work, Whitlock worked on the original series of Star Trek contributing matte paintings for several first-season episodes, some of which he reworked for use in later episodes. These have been replaced by CGI replicas in the remastered version of the series.

Whitlock was also responsible for the matte paintings in History of the World, Part I, and appeared in the movie as a character hawking used chariots. He also produced background mattes for Brooks earlier film High Anxiety, and appeared in that film in a small role as "noted industrialist Arthur Brisbane."

== Awards ==
=== Awards won ===
- 1975: Academy Award for Special Achievement in Visual Effects in Earthquake (shared with Frank Brendel, Glen Robinson)
- 1976: Academy Award for Special Achievement in Visual Effects in The Hindenburg (shared with Glen Robinson)
- 1985: Emmy for Outstanding Special Visual Effects in A.D. shared with Syd Dutton, Mark Whitlock, Bill Taylor, Dennis Glouner, Lynn Ledgerwood)

=== Awards nominated ===
- 1968: Academy Award for Special Effects in Tobruk (shared with Howard A. Anderson)
- 1979: Saturn Award for Best Special Effects in The Wiz
