= A Kiss to Build a Dream On =

Song
- Written: 1935, 1951
- Published: 1951 by Miller Music
- Songwriters: Bert Kalmar, Harry Ruby and Oscar Hammerstein II

"A Kiss to Build a Dream On" is a song composed by Bert Kalmar, Harry Ruby and Oscar Hammerstein II. In 1935, Kalmar and Ruby wrote a song called "Moonlight on the Meadow" for the Marx Brothers film A Night at the Opera (1935) but the song was not used. Hammerstein later adapted the lyrics to be "A Kiss to Build a Dream On" and it was recorded by Louis Armstrong in 1951.

It was also performed by Mickey Rooney with William Demarest, by Sally Forrest, and by Kay Brown (virtually the entire cast performed part or all of the song) in the 1951 film The Strip, and was a sort of recurring theme in the film. The song was nominated for the Academy Award for Best Original Song in 1951 but lost out to “In the Cool, Cool, Cool of the Evening”.

== Other recordings ==
- Another popular recording was made by one of The Strip film's guest-stars, Monica Lewis, and in early 1952, the version by Hugo Winterhalter and his Orchestra, with vocalist Johnny Parker, made it to the Pop 20 chart in the United States.
- Bing Crosby recorded it for his radio show in 1951 and it was later included in the deluxe, 22-track version of the album Songs I Wish I Had Sung the First Time Around.
- Sung by Richard Chamberlain, the song gained considerable exposure due to it being on the B-side of his 1962 hit, "Theme from Dr. Kildare (Three Stars Will Shine Tonight)".
- k.d. lang's version was included on the album A Wonderful World (2002).
- Rod Stewart covered the song for his 2004 album, Stardust: the Great American Songbook 3.
- Deana Martin recorded the song and it was released on her album, Volare in 2009 by Big Fish Records.

== In popular culture ==
- An instrumental version is heard in the background in the 1950 film Mister 880 at 21:39 minutes.
- The song was featured in the 1951 film The Strip.
- Julie Newmar, as Catwoman, references the song in the Batman episode "The Bat's Kow Tow".
- The song was featured in the soundtrack of the 1993 film Sleepless In Seattle.
- The 1951 version of the song was featured in the introductory sequence of the 1998 video game Fallout 2.
- The 2005 Bollywood picture Parineeta has a song based on the original tune called "Kaisi Paheli Zindagani".
- It was played as a background track during Yuri and Ava's party in the 2005 film Lord of War.
- Season four, episode one of Everwood, which aired in September 2005, is titled "A Kiss to Build a Dream On", and the song is played at the beginning of a wedding and repeated at the end of the wedding.
- It was featured as Jenny's favorite song in the 2009 film The Cry of the Owl.
- Amber Rubarth released a live binaural version on Sessions from the 17th War (2012) featuring Dave Eggar.
- It was featured in Episode 2 of the 2014 TV series Grantchester.
- It plays in the background in Season 1, Episode 4 of the television series Sex Education, released in 2019.
- It is in the Minecraft Legacy Editions in the Fallout Mash-up Pack as background music.
