= The Ed Sullivan Show =

American television variety show (1948–1971)

- Logo used for The Best of the Ed Sullivan Show package of clip shows since the early 1990s
- Also known as: Toast of the Town (1948–55)
- Genre: Variety; Sketch comedy
- Presented by: Ed Sullivan
- Announcer: Bern Bennett; Art Hannes; Ralph Paul
- Music by: Ray Bloch and the Ed Sullivan Show Orchestra
- Opening theme: "Toast"
- Composer: Ray Bloch
- Country of origin: United States
- Original language: English
- No. of seasons: 24
- No. of episodes: 1,068

Production
- Executive producer: Ed Sullivan
- Producers: Marlo Lewis; Bob Precht; Chester Feldman; Jack McGeehan
- Camera setup: Multi-camera
- Running time: 50–53 minutes
- Production companies: Sullivan Productions; CBS Productions

Original release
- Network: CBS
- Release: June 20, 1948 – March 28, 1971

The Ed Sullivan Show is an American television variety show that ran on CBS from June 20, 1948, to March 28, 1971, and was hosted by New York entertainment columnist Ed Sullivan. It was replaced in September 1971 by the CBS Sunday Night Movie.

In 2002, The Ed Sullivan Show was ranked No. 15 on TV Guide's 50 Greatest TV Shows of All Time. In 2013, the series finished No. 31 in TV Guide Magazine's 60 Best Series of All Time.

== History ==
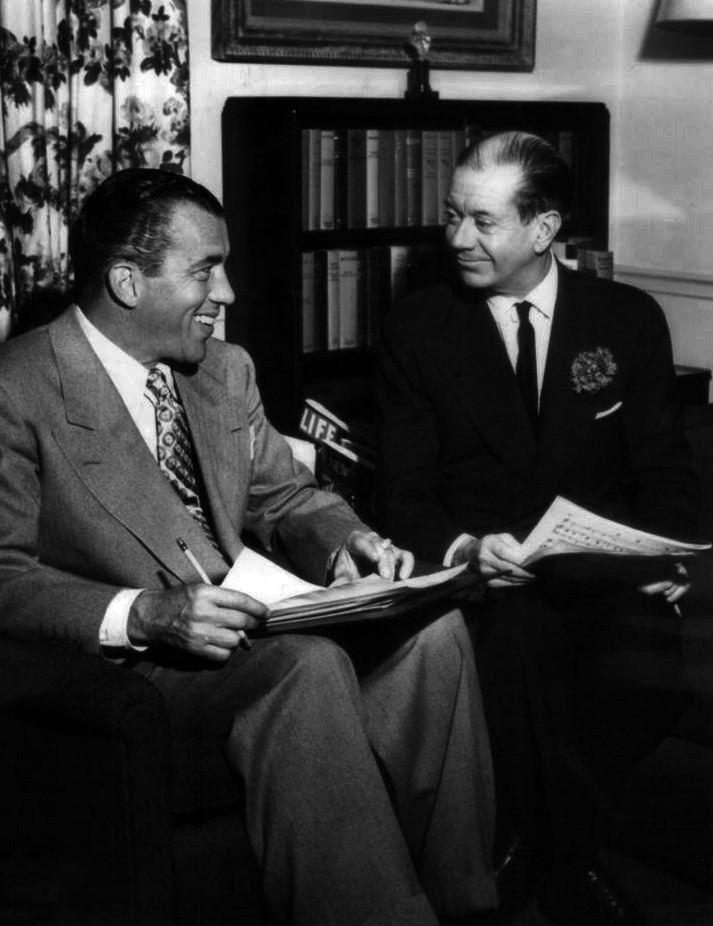
Ed Sullivan with Cole Porter in 1952

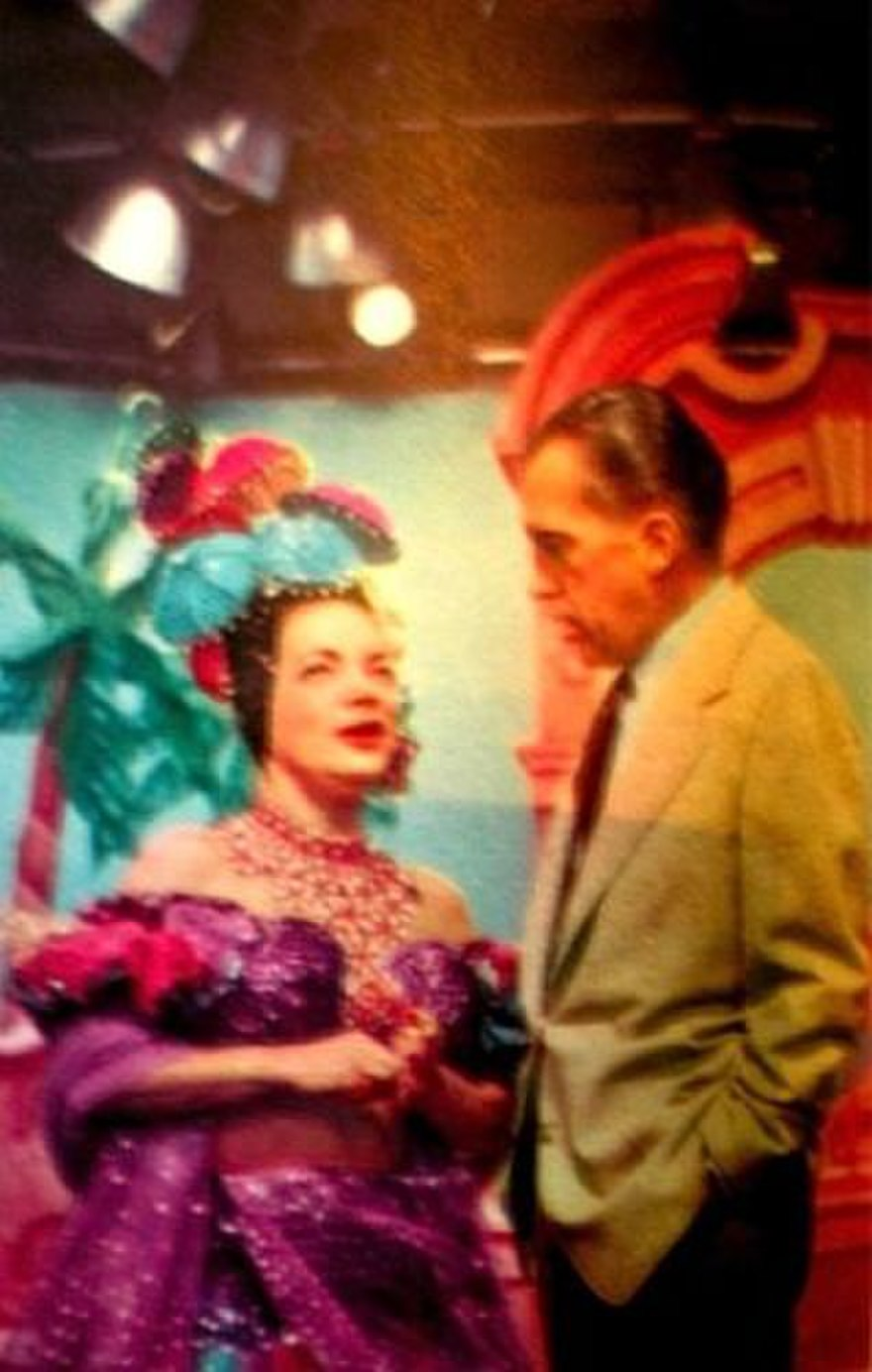
Carmen Miranda and Ed Sullivan on Toast of the Town, 1953

From 1948 until its cancellation in 1971, the show ran on CBS every Sunday night from 8–9 p.m. Eastern Time, and it is one of the few entertainment shows to have run in the same weekly time slot on the same network for more than two decades (during its first season, it ran from 9 to 10 p.m. ET). Virtually every type of entertainment appeared on the show; classical musicians, opera singers, popular recording artists, songwriters, comedians, ballet dancers, dramatic actors performing monologues from plays, and circus acts were regularly featured. The format was essentially the same as vaudeville and, although vaudeville had undergone a slow demise for a generation, Sullivan presented many ex-vaudevillians on his show.

Originally co-created and produced by Marlo Lewis, the show was first titled Toast of the Town, but was widely referred to as The Ed Sullivan Show for years before September 25, 1955, when that became its official name. In the show's June 20, 1948, debut, Dean Martin and Jerry Lewis performed along with singer Monica Lewis and Broadway composers Richard Rodgers and Oscar Hammerstein II previewing the score to their then-new show South Pacific, which opened on Broadway in 1949.

From 1948 through 1962, the program's primary sponsor was the Lincoln-Mercury Division of the Ford Motor Company; Sullivan read many commercials for Mercury vehicles live on the air during this period.

The Ed Sullivan Show was originally broadcast via live television from CBS-TV Studio 51, the Maxine Elliott Theatre, at Broadway and 39th Street, before moving to its permanent home at CBS-TV Studio 50 in New York City (1697 Broadway, at 53rd Street), which was renamed the Ed Sullivan Theater on the occasion of the program's 20th anniversary in June 1968. The last original Sullivan show telecast (#1068) was on March 28, 1971, with guests Melanie, Joanna Simon, Danny Davis and the Nashville Brass, and Sandler and Young. It was one of many older shows with followings in undesirable key demographics that were purged from the network lineups that summer. The purge led into the Prime Time Access Rule taking effect that fall. Repeats were scheduled through June 6, 1971.

== Background ==
Along with the new talent Sullivan booked each week, he also had recurring characters appear many times a season, such as his "Little Italian Mouse" puppet sidekick Topo Gigio, who debuted December 9, 1962, and ventriloquist Señor Wences debuted December 31, 1950. While most of the episodes aired live from New York City, the show also aired live on occasion from other nations, such as the United Kingdom, Australia, and Japan. For many years, Ed Sullivan was a national event each Sunday evening and was the first exposure for foreign performers to the American public. On the occasion of the show's tenth anniversary telecast, Sullivan commented on how the show had changed during a June 1958 interview syndicated by the Newspaper Enterprise Association (NEA):

The chief difference is mostly one of pace. In those days, we had maybe six acts. Now we have 11 or 12. Then, each of our acts would do a leisurely ten minutes or so. Now they do two or three minutes. And in those early days I talked too much. Watching these kines I cringe. I look up at me talking away and I say "You fool! Keep quiet!" But I just keep on talking. I've learned how to keep my mouth shut.

The show enjoyed phenomenal popularity in the 1950s and early 1960s. As it had occurred with the annual telecasts of The Wizard of Oz in the 1960s and the 1970s, the family ritual of gathering around the television set to watch Ed Sullivan became almost a U.S. cultural universal. He was regarded as a kingmaker, and performers considered an appearance on his program as a guarantee of stardom, although this sometimes did not turn out to be the case. The show's status at the turn of the decade is illustrated by its use as the backdrop of the 1960 musical Bye Bye Birdie. The musical's plot revolves around an ordinary teen girl's chance to kiss a rock star live on the Sullivan show, and in the song "Hymn for a Sunday Evening," her family expresses their regard for the program in worshipful tones. Sullivan appeared as himself in the musical's 1963 film adaptation.

In September 1965, CBS started televising the program in compatible color, as all three major networks began to switch to 100 percent color prime time schedules. CBS had once backed its own color system, developed by Peter Goldmark, and resisted using RCA's compatible process until 1954. At that time, it built its first New York City color TV studio, Studio 72, in a former RKO movie theater at 2248 Broadway (81st Street). One Ed Sullivan Show was broadcast on August 22, 1954, from the new studio, but it was mostly used for one-time-only specials such as Rodgers and Hammerstein's March 31, 1957 Cinderella. (The facility was later acquired by TeleTape Productions and became the first studio where the PBS children's program Sesame Street was produced.) CBS Studio 72 was demolished in 1986 and replaced by an apartment house. CBS Studio 50 was finally modernized for color broadcasts in 1965. The 1965–66 season premiere starred the Beatles in an episode airing on September 12, which was the last episode to air in black and white. This occurred because the episode was taped at the Beatles' convenience on August 14, the eve of their Shea Stadium performance and a two-week tour of North America, slightly before the program was ready for color transmission.

In the late 1960s, Sullivan remarked that his program was waning as the decade went on. He realized that to keep viewers, the best and brightest in entertainment had to be seen, or else the viewers were going to keep on changing the channel. Along with declining viewership, Ed Sullivan attracted a higher median age for the average viewer (which most sponsors found undesirable) as the seasons went on. Younger viewers were growing to actively dislike the program; in 1970, Sullivan's compilation special Ed Sullivan's Swinging Sixties drew widely negative reviews. These factors were the reason the show was cancelled by CBS on March 16, 1971, as part of a mass cancellation of advertiser-averse programming. While Sullivan's landmark program ended without a proper finale, Sullivan produced one-off specials for CBS until his death in 1974, including an Ed Sullivan Show 25th-anniversary special in 1973.

In 1990, television documentary producer Andrew Solt formed SOFA Entertainment, Inc. and purchased the exclusive rights to the complete library of The Ed Sullivan Show from Ed Sullivan's daughter Elizabeth and her husband Bob Precht. The collection consists of 1,087 hours of kinescopes and videotapes broadcast by CBS on Sunday nights from 1948 to 1971.

Since acquiring the rights to The Ed Sullivan Show library, SOFA Entertainment has catalogued, organized and cleared performance rights for the original shows. Starting in 1991, SOFA Entertainment has re-introduced The Ed Sullivan Show to the American public by producing numerous network specials, syndicating a half-hour series (that also aired on TV Land, PBS, VH1 and Decades) and home video compilations. Some of these compilations include The 4 Complete Ed Sullivan Shows Starring The Beatles, All 6 Ed Sullivan Shows Starring The Rolling Stones, Elvis: The Ed Sullivan Shows, Motown Gold from the Ed Sullivan Show, Ed Sullivan's Rock 'n Roll Classics, and 115 half-hour The Best of The Ed Sullivan Show specials, among others. Performances of this show are also available as video and audio downloads and as an app on iTunes." In 2021, MeTV began airing on Sunday nights half hour packages of performances from the show.

=== The Ed Sullivan Show Orchestra ===
In the early years of television, both CBS and NBC networks had their own symphony orchestras. NBC's was conducted by Arturo Toscanini and CBS's by Alfredo Antonini. The Ed Sullivan Show (originally presented as: The Toast of the Town) was basically a musical variety show, and thus members of the CBS orchestra were folded into the Ed Sullivan Show Orchestra, conducted by Ray Bloch. During the early days of television, the demands on studio musicians were many-tiered. They needed to be proficient in all genres of music, from classical, to jazz and to rock and roll. The Ed Sullivan Show would regularly feature singers from the Metropolitan Opera and the staff orchestra would accompany divas such as Eileen Farrell, Maria Callas or Joan Sutherland. The musicians needed to be prepared to switch gears for Ella Fitzgerald, Diahann Carroll or Sammy Davis Jr. and then onto The Jackson Five, Stevie Wonder or Tom Jones. They also needed to perform with some of the greatest dancers and ballerinas at the time, from Gregory Hines, Juliet Prowse, Maria Tallchief or Margo Fonteyn to the Peter Gennaro dancers. In the process, the musicians collaborated with several internationally recognized ballet troupes including: Ruth Page's Chicago Opera Ballet, the London Festival Ballet, Roland Petit's Ballets de Paris and Russia's Igor Moiseyev Ballet. Few musicians are capable of crossing over from one genre to another. However, each member of the Ed Sullivan Show Orchestra was a specialist and more than capable of covering the complete spectrum of music.

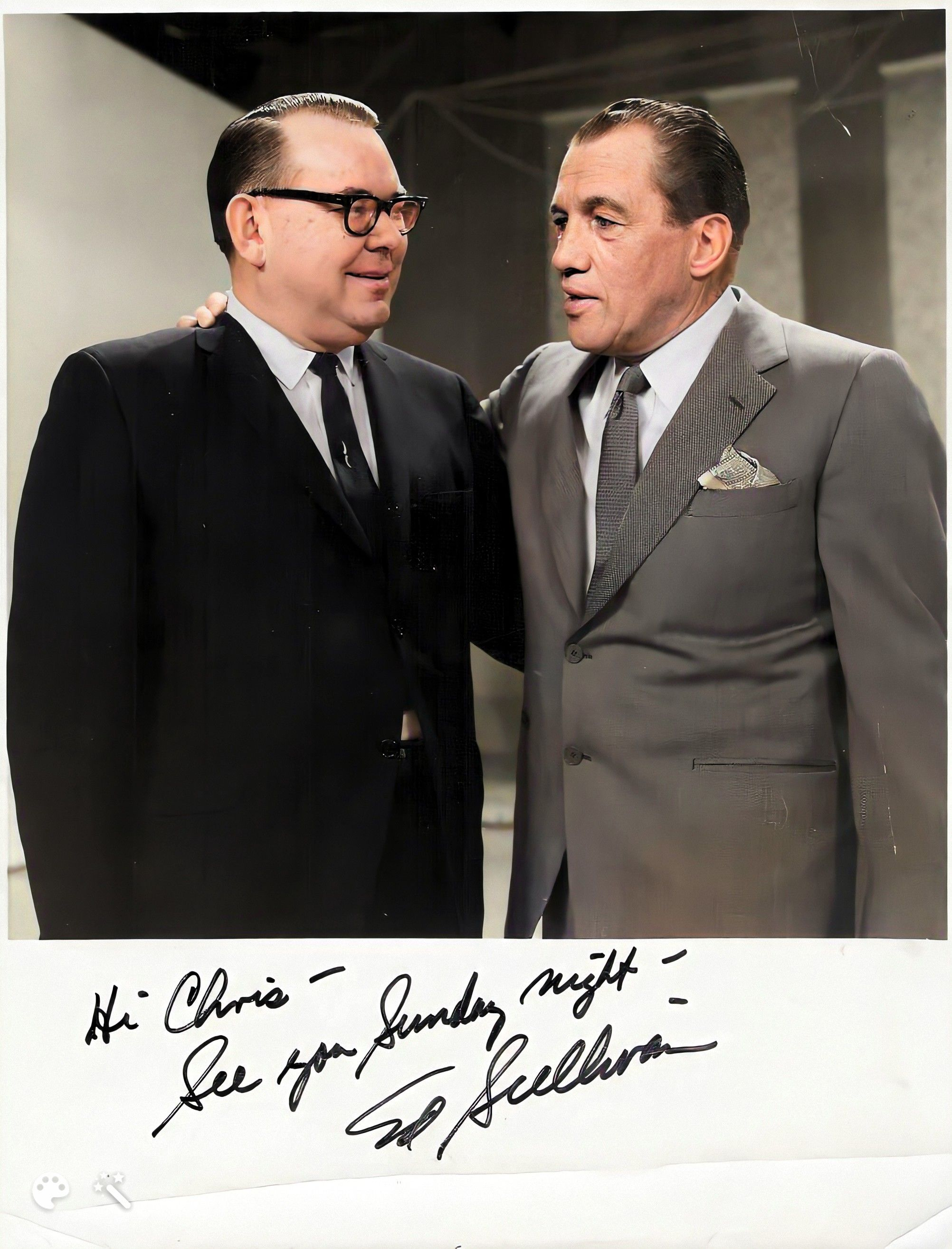
Chris Griffin and Ed Sullivan confer after show

The lead trumpet player is the "concert master" of a studio orchestra. Chris Griffin (formerly with the trumpet section of Harry James, Ziggy Elman and the Benny Goodman Band) was Ray Bloch's lead trumpet player for the many radio and television shows that he conducted, including the Ed Sullivan Show and The Jackie Gleason Show. Chris remained the lead trumpet player with The Ed Sullivan show from the first show in 1948 to the last show in 1971.

==== Band configuration ====
Trumpets: Chris Griffin, Bernie Privin, Jimmy Nottingham, and Thad Jones; Chris's son, Paul Griffin was a regular substitute trumpeter.

Trombones: Roland Dupont, Joe Bennet, Morton Bullman, Frank Rehak, and Cliff Heather

Saxophones: Toots Mondello, Bernie Kaufman, Artie Drellinger, Hymie Schertzer, Ed Zuhlke, et al

Piano: Hank Jones

Drums: Specs Powell/Howard Smith

Percussion: Milton Schlesinger

Unlike NBC's The Tonight Show (Steve Allen, Jack Paar, Johnny Carson), which celebrated the notoriety of their musicians in Skitch Henderson's or Doc Severinsen's "Tonight Show Band", the CBS producers of The Ed Sullivan Show decided to hide their famed musicians behind a curtain. Occasionally, CBS would broadcast specials and call upon the orchestra to perform. When Robert F. Kennedy was assassinated, music was hastily composed for the orchestra in a special tribute that also featured jazz pianist Bill Evans, who had recently composed an elegy to his father.

== Notable performances and guests ==
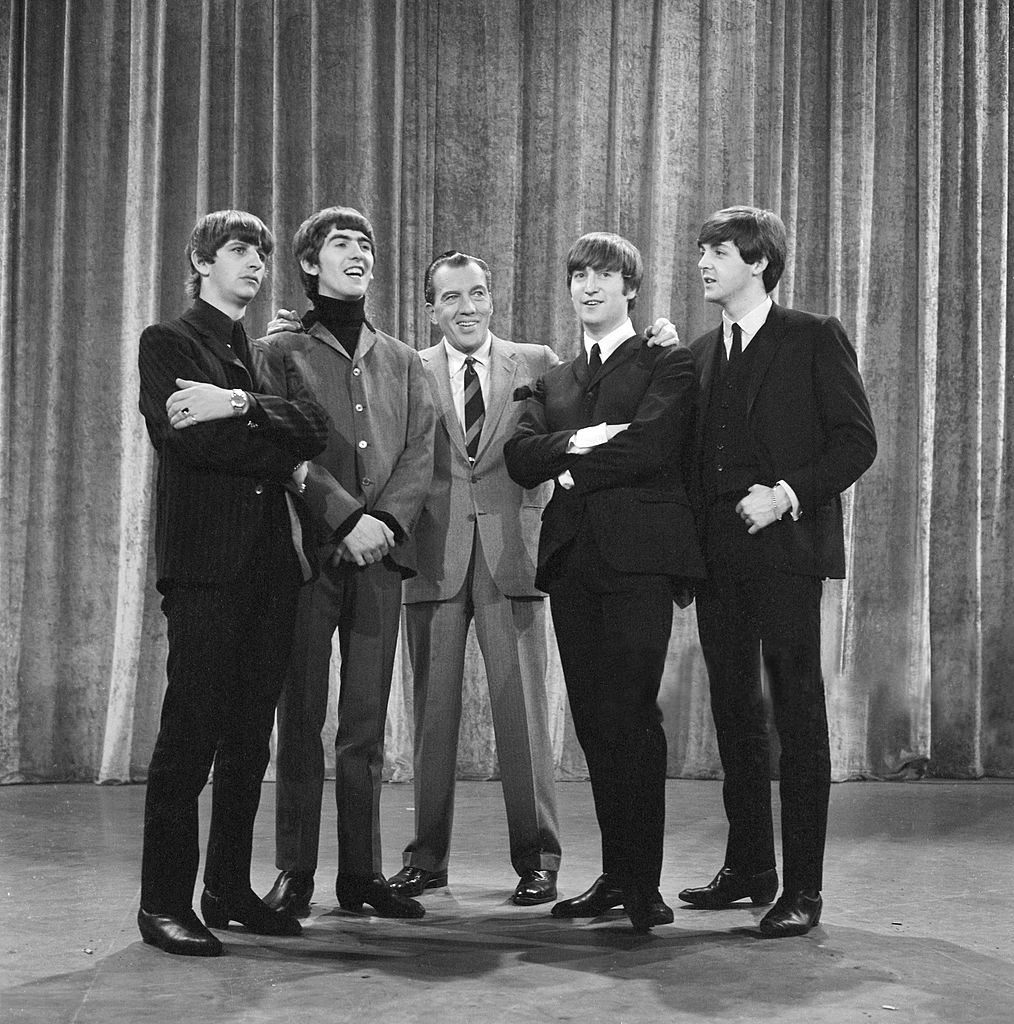
Sullivan and the Beatles, February 1964

The Ed Sullivan Show is especially known to the World War II and baby boomer generations for introducing acts and airing breakthrough performances by popular 1950s and 1960s musicians such as Elvis Presley, the Beatles, the Rolling Stones, the Doors, the Supremes, the Dave Clark Five, the Animals, Creedence Clearwater Revival, Dusty Springfield, the Beach Boys, the Jackson 5, Stevie Wonder, Buddy Holly, Janis Joplin, the Mamas and the Papas, the Lovin' Spoonful, Herman's Hermits, Dionne Warwick, Barbra Streisand, Petula Clark, Vanilla Fudge, the Band, and Gene Vincent and his Blue Caps.

The Canadian comedy duo Wayne and Shuster appeared on the program 67 times, a record for any performer. Bill Haley & His Comets performed their hit "Rock Around the Clock" in early August 1955, later recognized as the first rock and roll song broadcast on a national television program.

=== Itzhak Perlman ===
The American public's first exposure to Itzhak Perlman was on the show in 1958, when he was 13. This performance was a breakthrough not only for classical music, but also for Perlman, who rode the waves of admiration to new heights of fame lasting a generation.

=== Elvis Presley ===
==== Initial appearance ====
On September 9, 1956, Presley made his first appearance on The Ed Sullivan Show (after appearances on shows hosted by the Dorsey Brothers, Milton Berle, and Steve Allen), even though Sullivan had vowed never to allow Presley on the show. According to Sullivan biographer Michael David Harris, "Sullivan signed Presley when the host was having an intense Sunday-night rivalry with Steve Allen. Allen had the singer on his July 1 program, and beat Sullivan in the ratings. When asked to comment, [Sullivan] said that he wouldn't consider presenting Presley before a family audience. Less than two weeks later he changed his mind and signed a contract."

Just prior to the first Sullivan show, Presley was in Hollywood filming Love Me Tender, so Sullivan's producer, Marlo Lewis, flew to California to supervise the telecast that night from CBS Television City in Los Angeles. Sullivan, however, was not able to host his portion of the show from New York because he was recovering from an automobile accident. Charles Laughton guest-hosted in Sullivan's place, and opened the show. Music critic Greil Marcus wrote that Laughton's first reading poetry and then introducing four other acts first was intended to "make the moment invisible: to act as if nobody was actually waiting for anything" that evening.

Elvis Presley performing "Ready Teddy"

For his first set, Elvis delivered "Don't Be Cruel" and "Love Me Tender". According to writer Elaine Dundy, Presley sang "Love Me Tender" "straight, subdued and tender ...—a very different Elvis from the one on The Steve Allen Show three months before". Elvis's second set consisted of "Ready Teddy" and a shortened version of "Hound Dog". A popular myth claims Sullivan "censored" Presley by having the cameras shoot him from the waist up, but in fact, this only happened in Elvis' third and final appearance.

Although Laughton was the celebrity guest host, and there were seven other acts on the show, Elvis was on camera for more than a quarter of the time allotted to all acts. The broadcast garnered a 43.7 rating, and was viewed by a record 60.71 million people, which at the time represented an 82.6% share of the television audience, the largest single audience in television history. This share remains to date the largest in the history of American television.

==== Second and third appearances ====
"Hound Dog", October 28, 1956

Presley's second appearance fell on Sunday, October 28, 1956. In his first segment, Elvis performed "Don't Be Cruel" and "Love Me Tender". For the second segment, Elvis sang a new cut from his just-released second LP, "Love Me". Rounding out this visit Elvis delivered a full version of his #1 hit, "Hound Dog" and then reminded the audience about "Love Me Tender" being released on Thanksgiving Day and his return to the show in January. He closed by saying "May God bless you as he has blessed me."

For the third and final appearance on January 6, 1957, Presley finally opened the show. Apparently, a last-minute decision was also made to shoot the singer from the waist up at all times. It didn't seem to hinder the performance that followed. Elvis first ran down a medley of three #1 hits ("Hound Dog", "Love Me Tender", and "Heartbreak Hotel") then delivered a full version of "Don't Be Cruel", which he introduced as "my very biggest record last year." Later, his second appearance featured the new RCA single "Too Much" and a thank you for the "best Christmas we ever had." Then Elvis fell into another track from his second album, "When My Blue Moon Turns to Gold Again".

For his closing appearance, Sullivan introduced Elvis, touting an upcoming film project for Paramount and a benefit show in Los Angeles for Hungarian relief. Elvis followed with the gospel song "Peace in the Valley". Sullivan put his arm around the singer after he finished the song and praised him, saying "this is a real decent, fine boy."

The second and third appearances drew 57 million and 54.6 million viewers, respectively.

=== The Beatles ===
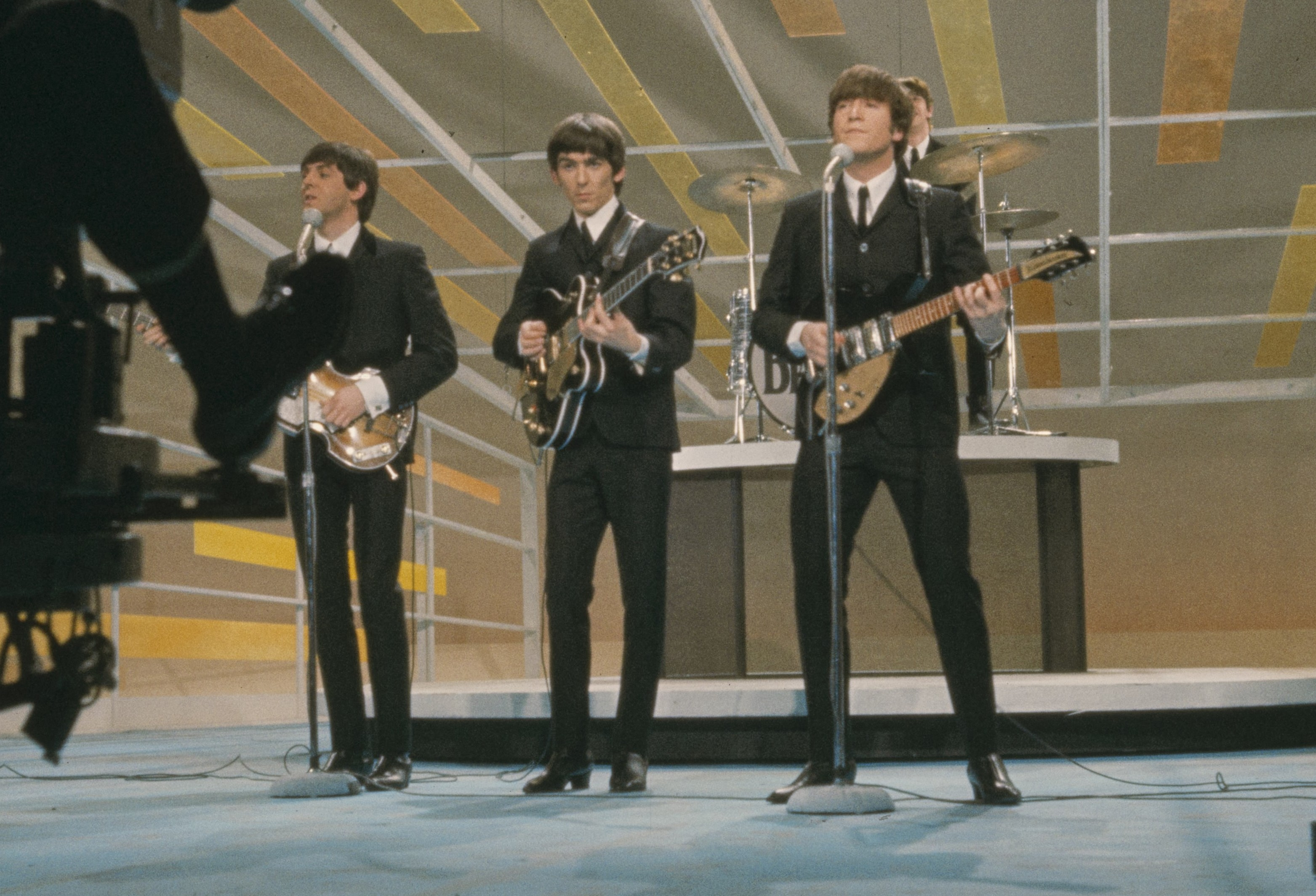
The Beatles performing in February 1964

In late 1963, Sullivan and his entourage happened also to be passing through Heathrow and witnessed how the Beatles' fans greeted the group on their return from Stockholm, where they had performed a television show as warmup band to local stars Suzie and Lill Babs. Sullivan was intrigued, telling his entourage it was the same thing as Elvis all over again. He initially offered Beatles manager Brian Epstein top dollar for a single show but the Beatles manager had a better idea—he wanted exposure for his clients: the Beatles would instead appear three times on the show, for only a minimal fee, but receive top billing and two spots (opening and closing) on each show.

The Beatles appeared on three consecutive Sundays in February 1964 to great anticipation and fanfare as "I Want to Hold Your Hand" had swiftly risen to No. 1 in the charts. Their first appearance on February 9 is considered a milestone in American pop culture, and furthermore the beginning of the British Invasion in music. The broadcast drew an estimated 73 million viewers, a record for U.S. television at the time (broken three years later by the series finale of The Fugitive). The Beatles followed Sullivan's show-opening intro, performing "All My Loving"; "Till There Was You", which featured the names of the group members superimposed on closeup shots, including the famous "SORRY GIRLS, HE'S MARRIED" caption on John Lennon; and "She Loves You". The act that followed the Beatles in the broadcast, magician Fred Kaps, was pre-recorded in order to allow time for an elaborate set change. The group returned later in the program to perform "I Saw Her Standing There" and "I Want to Hold Your Hand".

The following week's show was broadcast from Miami Beach where Cassius Clay (later known as Muhammad Ali) was in training for his first title bout with Sonny Liston. The occasion was used by both camps for publicity. On the evening of the television show (February 16) a crush of people nearly prevented the band from making it onstage. A wedge of policemen were needed and the band began playing "She Loves You" only seconds after reaching their instruments. They continued with "This Boy" and "All My Loving", then returned later to close the show with "I Saw Her Standing There", "From Me to You", and "I Want to Hold Your Hand".

They were shown on tape February 23 (this appearance had been taped earlier in the day on February 9 before their first live appearance). They followed Sullivan's intro with "Twist and Shout" and "Please Please Me" and closed the show once again with "I Want to Hold Your Hand".

The Beatles appeared live for the final time on August 14, 1965. The show was broadcast September 12, 1965, and earned Sullivan a 60-percent share of the nighttime audience for one of the appearances. This time they followed three acts before coming out to perform "I Feel Fine", "I'm Down", and "Act Naturally" and then closed the show with "Ticket to Ride", "Yesterday", and "Help!" Although this was their final live appearance on the show, the group provided filmed promotional clips of songs to air exclusively on Sullivan's program over the next few years, including videos of both "Paperback Writer" and "Rain" from 1966 and three clips from 1967, including "Penny Lane", "Strawberry Fields Forever", and "Hello, Goodbye". In late 1967, the group also sent a telegram to Sullivan in addition to their promotional clips, a note which the host read live on air. The group's last appearance on Sullivan's program was via prerecorded promotional clips of their songs "Two of Us" and "Let It Be", broadcast on the show on the first day of March in 1970. Although both videos were recorded in late January 1969, the delay was due to the band's dissatisfaction with the tedious Let It Be album sessions and the group's impending break-up. In all probability, the scheduling of the March 1970 broadcast was to promote the release of the band's upcoming film Let It Be that May.

=== The Doors ===
In September 1967, The Doors appeared on The Ed Sullivan Show, where they were scheduled to perform "People Are Strange" and "Light My Fire". Before their performance of "Light My Fire", the show's producers told the band's frontman, Jim Morrison, that he had to censor the lyric "girl, we couldn't get much higher," as network executives believed it was a reference to drug use. Morrison agreed backstage, but when the performance began, he sang the original lyric without hesitation. The moment was broadcast live to millions of viewers.

After the show, Ed Sullivan refused to shake the band's hands, and a producer informed them they would never be invited back. Morrison reportedly replied, "Hey man, we just did The Ed Sullivan Show" making it clear he didn't care about the ban. This act of defiance became one of rock music's most famous moments, cementing Morrison's rebellious reputation and The Doors' image as a band unwilling to compromise their art for television.

=== Black artists ===
==== The Supremes ====
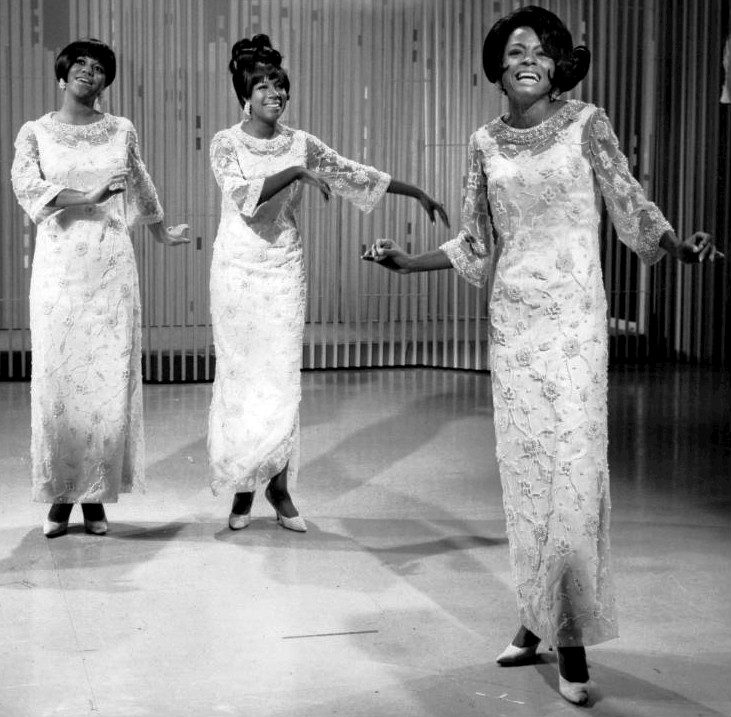
The Supremes singing "My World Is Empty Without You". L–R Florence Ballard, Mary Wilson and Diana Ross (Feb. 20, 1966)

The Supremes were a special act for The Ed Sullivan Show. In addition to 14 appearances, they were a personal favorite of Sullivan, who affectionately called them "The Girls". Over the five years they performed on the program, the Supremes performed 15 of their hit singles, and numerous Broadway showtunes and other non-Motown songs. The group featuring the most popular lineup of Diana Ross, Mary Wilson, and Florence Ballard appeared 7 times from December 1964 through May 1967.

The group reappeared on the series in October 1967 as the newly rebilled "Diana Ross & the Supremes", with Ballard replacement Cindy Birdsong and Ross more prominently featured. The Supremes' final appearance on the show, shortly before it ended, served as the platform to introduce America to Ross's replacement, Jean Terrell, in March 1970.

==== Impact ====
Sullivan launched the careers of many black performers by presenting them to a nationwide TV audience and ignored the criticism. In an NEA interview, Sullivan commented:

The most important thing [during the first ten years of the program] is that we've put on everything but bigotry. When the show first started in '48, I had a meeting with the sponsors. There were some Southern dealers present and they asked if I intended to put on Negroes. I said yes. They said I shouldn't, but I convinced them I wasn't going to change my mind. And you know something? We've gone over very well in the South. Never had a bit of trouble.

The show included entertainers such as Frankie Lymon, The Supremes, Marian Anderson, Louis Armstrong, Pearl Bailey, LaVern Baker, Harry Belafonte, Brook Benton, James Brown (and the Famous Flames), Cab Calloway, Godfrey Cambridge, Diahann Carroll, Ray Charles, Nat King Cole, Bill Cosby, Count Basie, Dorothy Dandridge, Sammy Davis Jr., Bo Diddley, Duke Ellington, Lola Falana, the 5th Dimension, Ella Fitzgerald, the Four Tops, Dick Gregory, W. C. Handy, Lena Horne, the Jackson 5, Mahalia Jackson, Louis Jordan, Bill Kenny, B. B. King, George Kirby, Eartha Kitt, Gladys Knight & the Pips, Little Anthony and the Imperials, Moms Mabley, Johnny Mathis, the Miracles, Melba Moore, the Platters, Leontyne Price, Richard Pryor, Lou Rawls, Della Reese, Nipsey Russell, Nina Simone, Sly and the Family Stone, The Talbot Brothers, the Temptations, Martha and the Vandellas, Ike & Tina Turner, Leslie Uggams, Sarah Vaughan, William Warfield, Dionne Warwick, Dinah Washington, Ethel Waters, Flip Wilson, Jackie Wilson, Nancy Wilson, and Stevie Wonder.

Before his death in a plane crash in December 1967, soul singer Otis Redding had been booked to appear on the show the following year. One telecast included African-American bass-baritone Andrew Frierson singing "Ol' Man River" from Kern and Hammerstein's Show Boat, a song that, at that time, was usually sung on television by white singers, although it was written for a black character in the musical.

However, Sullivan featured "rockers", and gave prominence to black musicians "not without censorship". For instance, he scheduled Fats Domino "at the show's end in case he had to cancel a guest". He presented Domino alone at his piano singing as if he were a young Nat King Cole or Fats Waller, as he performed "Blueberry Hill". On March 4, 1962, Sullivan presented Domino and his band, who did "Jambalaya", Hank Williams' "You Win Again", and "Let the Four Winds Blow". All seven of Domino's band members were visible to millions of viewers. On December 1, 1957, Sam Cooke performed a complete version of "For Sentimental Reasons". Cooke had been cut off four weeks earlier during a live performance of "You Send Me" as the show's allotted time expired, causing an outrage among television audiences. Sullivan rebooked Cooke for the December 1 show to overwhelming success.

=== The Muppets ===
Between 1966 and 1971, Jim Henson performed some of his Muppet characters on the show. The characters made a total of 25 appearances.

Henson's Muppets were introduced on The Ed Sullivan Show on September 18, 1966. Sullivan introduced the characters as "Jim, uh ... Newsom's puppets." The act featured a small ball of fur growing into the Rock and Roll Monster (performed by Jim Henson, Jerry Nelson, and Frank Oz) with three heads and six arms lip-syncing to the unreleased song "Rock It to Me" by the Bruthers. After the act was done, the Rock and Roll Monster shrunk back into the ball of fur which is then eaten by Sour Bird (who was previously used in a commercial for Royal Crown Cola).

=== Topo Gigio ===
Topo Gigio, a puppet of a mouse with the mannerisms of a little Italian boy, was a regular guest on the show from 1962 until its end in 1971. Creator Maria Perego would operate the puppetry with two assistants while Peppino Mazzullo would provide the child mouse's voice, performing routines written by American staffers (among them a young Joan Rivers, whose first professional writing gig was a Topo Gigio sketch). A typical Topo Gigio routine would have Sullivan carrying on a conversation with Topo, allowing Sullivan to show a softer, friendlier personality compared to the more stoic stage persona he showed when dealing with adult acts. Using black art illusions, Topo could be seen as a full-body puppet, allowing him to dance and interact with Sullivan in ways other puppets could not do so easily, which charmed Sullivan. Each sketch would end with Topo being tucked into bed as he asks Sullivan to kiss him goodnight.

=== Broadway ===
The show is also noteworthy for showcasing performances from numerous classic Broadway musicals of the era, often featuring members of the original Broadway casts. These include:

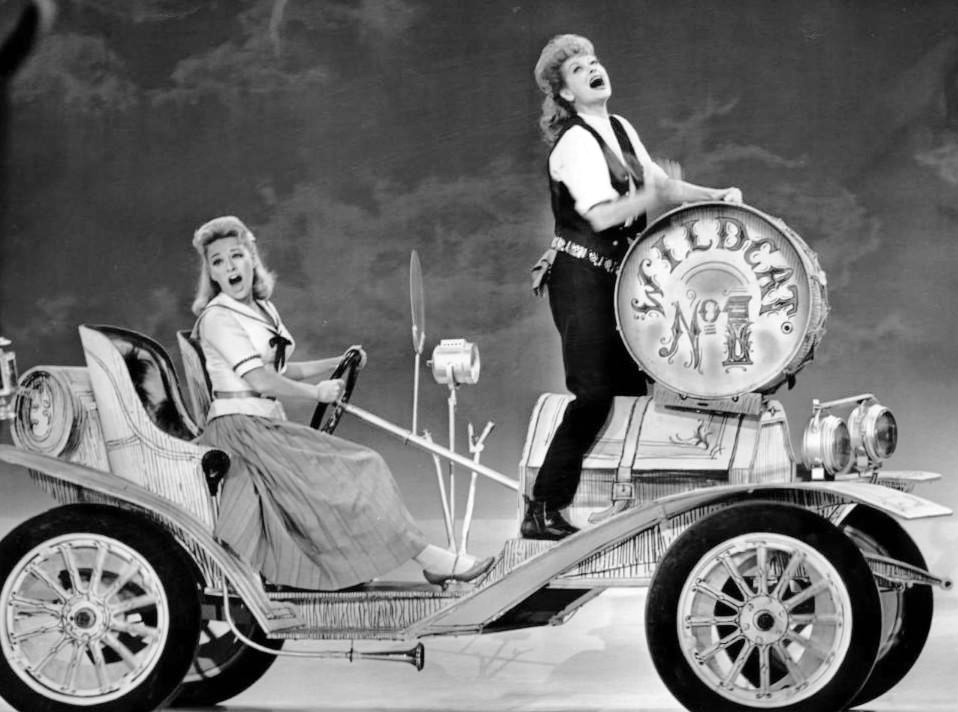
Paula Stewart and Lucille Ball performing "Hey, Look Me Over" from Wildcat (1961)

- West Side Story – Carol Lawrence and Larry Kert singing "Tonight"; the members of the Jets gang performing "Cool".
- My Fair Lady – Julie Andrews singing "I Could Have Danced All Night" and "Wouldn't It Be Loverly?"; Rex Harrison performing "Why Can't the English?"; Charles Victor performing "With a Little Bit of Luck; John Michael King singing "On the Street Where You Live"
- Camelot – Richard Burton and Julie Andrews performing an extended scene including the title song and "What Do the Simple Folk Do?"; Robert Goulet singing "If Ever I Would Leave You" and "C'est Moi".
- Show Boat (1961 New York City Center revival) – Andrew Frierson singing "Ol' Man River", and Carol Bruce, from the 1946 Broadway revival, singing "Bill".
- Carnival! – Anna Maria Alberghetti singing "Love Makes the World Go 'Round".
- Bye Bye Birdie – Dick Van Dyke singing "Put On A Happy Face", Chita Rivera singing "Spanish Rose", Paul Lynde singing "Kids" and "Hymn for a Sunday Evening (Ed Sullivan)".
- Oliver! – Georgia Brown singing "As Long as He Needs Me"; Davy Jones singing "Consider Yourself"; Georgia Brown, Davy Jones, Alice Playten, Bruce Prochnik, Clive Revill and the boys singing "I'd Do Anything". The performance was on February 9, 1964—on the same telecast as The Beatles' first live performance.
- Oklahoma! – John Raitt, Celeste Holm, Florence Henderson and Barbara Cook performing the title song; Celeste Holm (from the original Broadway cast) performing "I Can't Say No".
- Sweet Charity – Gwen Verdon performing "I'm A Brass Band" and "If My Friends Could See Me Now".
- The Roar of the Greasepaint – The Smell of the Crowd – Anthony Newley singing "Who Can I Turn To?".
- Flora the Red Menace – Liza Minnelli singing "All I Need Is One Good Break" and "Sing Happy"
- Flower Drum Song – Pat Suzuki performing "I Enjoy Being a Girl".
- Gentlemen Prefer Blondes – Carol Channing singing "Diamonds Are A Girl's Best Friend".
- Hair – the cast (including Diane Keaton, Melba Moore, Paul Jabara and co-authors Gerome Ragni and James Rado) performing "Aquarius".
- Hello, Dolly! – Pearl Bailey (from the all-black 1967 revamping of the show) performing "Before the Parade Passes By" with the ensemble.
- A performance by Broadway dancer Wayne Lamb
- I Do! I Do! – Gordon MacRae and Carol Lawrence (Broadway replacements for Mary Martin and Robert Preston) singing the title song from the show, and MacRae singing "I Love My Wife" and "My Cup Runneth Over".
- Kiss Me, Kate – Alfred Drake, Patricia Morison, Lisa Kirk, and Harold Lang singing "Another Op'nin' Another Show", "We Open In Venice", and "Wunderbar"
- Man of La Mancha – Richard Kiley singing the title song and "The Impossible Dream"; Joan Diener in a rare television appearance in her stage role as Aldonza/Dulcinea singing "What Does He Want of Me?", most of the cast singing the show's final reprise of "The Impossible Dream"
- Cabaret – Joel Grey singing part of "Wilkommen" and Jill Haworth in her stage role as Sally Bowles singing the title song
- Purlie – Melba Moore singing "I Got Love" and "Purlie".
- Wildcat – Lucille Ball and Paula Stewart singing "Hey, Look Me Over"
- You're a Good Man, Charlie Brown – Gary Burghoff, Reva Rose, Bob Balaban, Skip Hinnant, Karen Johnson, and Bill Hinnant singing the title song and "Happiness".
- Ethel Merman also occasionally appeared singing hit songs from the shows that she starred in, including Annie Get Your Gun, Gypsy, Happy Hunting, Panama Hattie, and Anything Goes.
- Hermione Gingold and Maurice Chevalier performed their duet "I Remember It Well" from the 1958 film Gigi, on the show.
- 1776 – the full cast performed "Sit Down, John," with William Daniels as lead.

Most of these artists performed in the same makeup and costumes that they wore in the shows, often providing the only visual recordings of these performances by the original cast members, since there were no network telecasts of the Tony Awards until 1967. Many performances have been compiled and released on DVD as The Best of Broadway Musicals – Original Cast Performances from The Ed Sullivan Show.

== Mental illness program ==
In a 1958 NEA interview, Sullivan noted his pride about the show's role in improving the public's understanding of mental illness. Sullivan considered his May 17, 1953, telecast to be the single most important episode in the show's first decade. During that show, a salute to Broadway director Joshua Logan, the two men were watching in the wings, and Sullivan asked Logan how he thought the show was doing. According to Sullivan, Logan told him that the show was becoming "another one of those and-then-I-wrote shows"; Sullivan asked him what he should do about it, and Logan volunteered to talk about his experiences in a mental institution.

== Controversies ==
=== Bo Diddley ===
On November 20, 1955, African-American rock 'n' roll singer and guitarist Bo Diddley appeared on The Ed Sullivan Show, only to infuriate Sullivan ("I did two songs and he got mad"). Diddley had been asked to sing Tennessee Ernie Ford's hit "Sixteen Tons," which he agreed. But while the show was on air, he changed his mind and sang his eponymous single "Bo Diddley".

A reporter, who was present at the time, described what happened:

Controversy raged for over an hour backstage at CBS Studios 57, last Sunday, immediately following Ed Sullivan's signon on his coast to coast television show, "Toast of the Town". In a verbal battle which started over one of the performers refusal to do a number on the telecast which Sullivan had requested. During the dress rehearsal, Bo Diddley, listed as number "seven" in the lineups of stars participating in the show, agreed to do "16 Tons" as Marlo Lewis, Toast of the Town Executive Producer and Sullivan had requested. However, at 8:39 p.m. as Sullivan went into his commercial, the folk singer hurried to the side of Ray Block, musical director, to announce that he had "changed his mind" and was going to do "Diddley Daddy". [sic] After several attempts to get him to change his mind, CBS brass went into a hurried conference in an attempt to synchronize the timing of the show with a longer number. The final result of this conference was the cutting of two acts which preceded Bo Diddley's number. Following the act in where Willis Jackson, band leaded, played his saxophone barefooted. Sullivan and disk jockey Tommy Smalls, manager of the act, got into a heated argument backstage. By the time John Wray, Executive Director, had taken the show off the air, Bo Diddley, Smalls, his agent, Lewis, Ray Block and several members of the band had instituted a series of verbal attack on the change in programming. Bo Diddley stated, backed by Smalls, that he had switched from 16 Tons to Diddley Daddy because the latter had made him a juke box favorite and people from coast-to-coast were expecting him to perform the number. Sullivan and Lewis maintained that he should have notified them of the change before air time, instead of after the show was in progress.

=== A Short Vision ===
On May 27, 1956, The Ed Sullivan Show presented an animated short film entitled A Short Vision. The short subject showcased an unidentified object that is referred to as it by the narrator. The object flies over Earth. When it passes, the people are asleep except the leaders and the wise men who look up at the object. As the leaders and wise men look up and predators and prey hide in fear, it produces a mushroom cloud in the sky, killing everyone and everything, vaporizing the people, the animals and Earth. After this happens, there remains only a moth and a flame. The moth flies to the flame, gets vaporized and the flame dies. Thus, marking the end of humanity.

The short film is narrated in the style of the Bible. The animation is derived from mostly still images that produce a terrifying and horrifying moving image of the end of humanity. Just before CBS showed the film, Sullivan assured children that what they would see was an animated fantasy. He told the audience that "It is grim, but I think we can all stand it to realize that in war there is no winner". The film gained notoriety from the show; but it also gained controversy because of it, due to the graphic way it depicted the horrors of a nuclear confrontation. Its graphic images also caused controversy. One of the visuals in the film depicted an animated character's eyes imploding and the remains running down its cheeks and then it gets destroyed by the object.

According to some sources, including contemporary newspaper reports, Ed Sullivan's telecast of A Short Vision caused a reaction as significant as Orson Welles' The War of the Worlds radio broadcast 20 years prior. Because of the popularity of the short film, The Ed Sullivan Show broadcast it again on June 10 of the same year. Sullivan—who in an interview after the first showing erroneously claimed that he had warned children to not watch it—asked adults to remove children from the room before watching the second, heavily publicized showing.

=== Jackie Mason ===
On October 18, 1964, Jackie Mason allegedly gave Sullivan the finger on air. A tape of the incident shows Mason doing his stand-up comedy act and then looking toward Sullivan, commenting that Sullivan was signaling him. Sullivan was reportedly letting Mason know (by pointing two fingers) that he had only two minutes left, as CBS was about to cut away to show a speech by President Lyndon Johnson. Mason began working his own fingers into his act and pointed toward Sullivan with his middle finger slightly separated. After Mason left the stage, the camera then cut to a visibly angry Sullivan.

Sullivan argued with Mason backstage, then terminated his contract. Mason denied knowingly giving Sullivan the middle finger, and Mason later claimed that he had never even heard of the gesture at that time. In retaliation, to protect the perceived threat to his career, Mason filed a libel suit at the New York Supreme Court, which he won.

Sullivan publicly apologized to Mason when he appeared on the show two years later, in 1966. At that time, Mason opened his monologue by saying, "It's a great thrill and a fantastic opportunity to see me in person again," and impersonated Sullivan during his act. Mason later appeared on the show five times: April 23, 1967; February 25, 1968; November 24, 1968; June 22, 1969; and August 31, 1969.

=== The Doors ===
During the Doors' rehearsal, Jim Morrison sang the alternate line of "Light My Fire". However, he accidentally reverted to the original line during the live show, and CBS executives were powerless to change it. The Doors were never invited back to the show. According to Ray Manzarek, the band was told, "Mr. Sullivan liked you boys. He wanted you on six more times. ... You'll never do the Sullivan show again." Morrison replied with glee, "Hey man, we just did the Sullivan show." At the time, an appearance was a hallmark of success.

Manzarek gave differing accounts of what happened. He had said that the band only pretended to agree to change the line but also that Morrison was nervous and simply forgot to change the line. The performance and incident were reenacted in Oliver Stone's 1991 biographical film, The Doors, albeit in a more dramatic fashion, with Morrison portrayed as emphasizing the word "higher".

Sullivan apparently felt the damage had been done and relented on bands using the word "higher". Sly & the Family Stone later appeared on the show and performed their 1969 hit "I Want to Take You Higher".

== Ratings history ==
- 1948–1949: N/A
- 1949–1950: N/A
- 1950–1951: #15, 3,723,000 viewers
- 1951–1952: N/A
- 1952–1953: N/A
- 1953–1954: #17, 8,580,000 viewers
- 1954–1955: #5, 12,157,200 viewers
- 1955–1956: #3, 13,785,500 viewers
- 1956–1957: #2, 14,937,600 viewers
- 1957–1958: #27, 11,444,160 viewers
- 1958–1959: N/A
- 1959–1960: #12, 12,810,000 viewers
- 1960–1961: #15, 11,800,000 viewers
- 1961–1962: #19, 11,381,525 viewers
- 1962–1963: #14, 12,725,900 viewers
- 1963–1964: #8, 14,190,000 viewers
- 1964–1965: #16, 13,280,400 viewers
- 1965–1966: #18, 12,493,200 viewers
- 1966–1967: #13, 12,569,640 viewers
- 1967–1968: #13, 13,147,440 viewers
- 1968–1969: #23, 12,349,000 viewers
- 1969–1970: #27, 11,875,500 viewers
- 1970–1971: N/A

Highlights:

9/9/1956: Elvis Presley's first appearance yielding an 82.6 percentage share, the highest in television history for any program up to the present. Viewers: 60.71 million Source: Broadcasting and Telecasting, October 1956 as per ARB the precursor of Nielsen.

2/9/1964: The Beatles's first appearance yielding a 45.3 rating. Viewers: 73.7 million Source: Nielsen.

Other noteworthy ratings:

2/16/1964: 43.8 rating the Beatles' second appearance. Source: Nielsen.

10/28/1956: 43.7 rating Elvis Presley's second appearance. Source: Trendex.

== Primetime specials ==
Date	Title	Network	Rating	Length
2/02/1975	The Sullivan Years: A Tribute To Ed	CBS		7:30-8:30 p.m.
2/17/1991	The Very Best of Ed Sullivan	CBS	21.3	9–11 p.m. (Competition: Love, Lies and Murder: Part 1 got a 15.5 rating)
11/24/1991	The Very Best of Ed Sullivan 2	CBS	17.1	9–11 p.m.
8/07/1992	The Very Best of the Ed Sullivan Show	CBS	9.4	9–11 p.m. (The Mary Tyler Moore Show: The 20th Anniversary Show got a 6.1 rating at 8 p.m.)
12/20/1992	Holiday Greetings from the Ed Sullivan Show	CBS	14.3	9–11 p.m.
5/19/1995	The Ed Sullivan All-Star Comedy Special	CBS	8.2	9–11 p.m.
7/14/1995	The Very Best of Ed Sullivan	CBS	7.5	9–11 p.m.
5/18/1998	Ed Sullivan's 50th Anniversary	CBS	9.3	10–11 p.m.

== Parodies ==
The show's popularity has been the target of numerous tributes and parodies. These include:

- On an episode of The Colgate Comedy Hour, Dean Martin and Jerry Lewis did a parody called The Toast of the Colgate Town, with Lewis wearing fake teeth and slicked-back hair as "Ed Solomon".
- The first episode of the Late Show with David Letterman on August 30, 1993, featured clips of Ed Sullivan spliced together to make it look as though he was introducing host David Letterman, while a segment later in the episode featured David channeling the "ghost" of Ed Sullivan, this time an archive clip of Sullivan introducing actor Paul Newman, who was live in the Letterman audience that night. Since moving to CBS from NBC, Letterman taped his show in the Ed Sullivan Theater, the studio where Sullivan also staged his program, until his 2015 retirement. This parody was reprised on May 21, 2026 for the final episode of The Late Show with Stephen Colbert, beginning with a clip of Sullivan before splicing together clips of many former and current American late night hosts.
- On May 18, 1998, UPN aired a series pilot for The Virtual Ed Sullivan Show, featuring a computerized version of Sullivan, in conjunction with the voice and body movements of impressionist John Byner (who had appeared on Sullivan several times), who was fitted with a motion-capture sensor suit while backstage.

== Bibliography ==
- Garner, Joe (2002). Stay Tuned: Television's Unforgettable Moments. Kansas City: Andrews McMeel Publishing, ISBN 0-7407-2693-5.
- Kaplan, Fred (February 6, 2004). "Teen Spirit: What Was So Important About the Beatles' Appearances on The Ed Sullivan Show?". Slate Magazine. Archived from the original on April 10, 2005.
- Nachman, Gerald. Right Here on Our Stage Tonight!: Ed Sullivan's America. Berkeley, California: University of California Press; 2009. ISBN 978-0-520-25867-9 p. 331.
- Ilson, Bernie. Sundays with Sullivan: How the Ed Sullivan Show brought Elvis, the Beatles and Culture to America. Lanham, Maryland: Taylor Trade Publishing, (2009). ISBN 978-1-58979-390-3 pp. 115–118 (entire chapter devoted to Marlo Lewis).
- John Leonard; Claudia Falkenburg & Andrew Solt, eds.. A Really Big Show: A Visual History of the Ed Sullivan Show. New York: Sarah Lazin/Viking Studio Books; 1992. ISBN 978-0-670-84246-9.
- James Maguire. Impresario: The Life and Times of Ed Sullivan. New York: Billboard Books; 2006. ISBN 978-0-8230-7962-9.
