= Ed Sullivan =

American host and columnist (1901–1974)

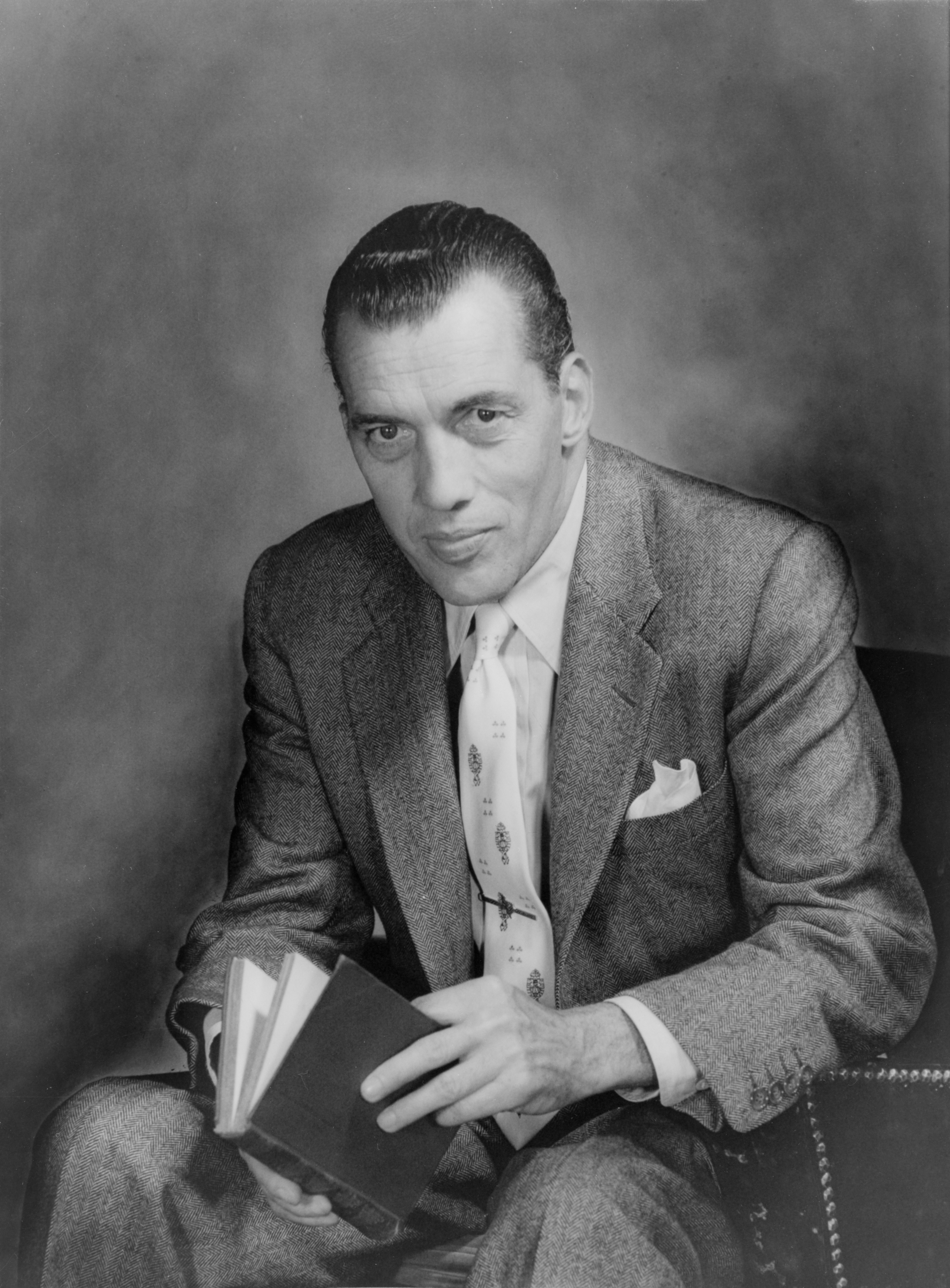
- Sullivan in 1955
- Born: Edward Vincent Sullivan; September 28, 1901; New York City, U.S.
- Died: October 13, 1974 (aged 73); New York City, U.S.
- Burial place: Ferncliff Cemetery
- Occupations: Television host; reporter; newspaper columnist
- Years active: 1919–1974
- Spouse: Sylvia Weinstein Sullivan (m. 1930; died 1973)
- Children: 1

Edward Vincent Sullivan (September 28, 1901 – October 13, 1974) was an American television host, impresario, sports and entertainment reporter, and syndicated columnist for the New York Daily News and the Chicago Tribune New York News Syndicate. He was the creator and host of the television variety program Toast of the Town, which in 1955 was renamed The Ed Sullivan Show. Broadcast from 1948 to 1971, it set a record as the longest-running variety show in U.S. broadcast history. "It was, by almost any measure, the last great American TV show", said television critic David Hinckley. "It's one of our fondest, dearest pop culture memories."

Sullivan was a broadcasting pioneer during the early years of American television. As critic David Bianculli wrote, "Before MTV, Sullivan presented rock acts. Before Bravo, he presented jazz and classical music and theater. Before the Comedy Channel and The Tonight Show, Sullivan discovered, anointed, and popularized young comedians. Before there were 500 channels, before there was cable, Ed Sullivan was where the choice was. From the start, he was indeed 'the Toast of the Town'." In 1996, Sullivan was ranked number 50 on TV Guide's "50 Greatest TV Stars of All Time".

== Early life and career ==
Sullivan was born on September 28, 1901, in Harlem, New York City, to Elizabeth F. (née Smith) and Peter Arthur Sullivan, a customs house employee. His twin brother Daniel was sickly and died when he was two. Sullivan was raised in Port Chester, New York, where the family lived in a small red brick home at 53 Washington Street. He was of Irish descent. The family loved music, frequently playing the piano, singing and playing phonograph records. Sullivan was a gifted athlete in high school, earning 12 athletic letters at Port Chester High School. He played football as a halfback, basketball as a guard and track as a sprinter. With the baseball team, Sullivan was a catcher and the team's captain, leading the team to several championships. Sullivan noted that, in the state of New York, integration was taken for granted in high-school sports: "When we went up into Connecticut, we ran into clubs that had Negro players. In those days this was accepted as commonplace; and so, my instinctive antagonism years later to any theory that a Negro wasn't a worthy opponent or was an inferior person. It was just as simple as that."

Sullivan landed his first job at The Port Chester Daily Item, a local newspaper for which he had written sports news while in high school and which he joined full-time after graduation. In 1919, he joined The Hartford Post, but the newspaper folded in his first week there. He next worked for The New York Evening Mail as a sports reporter. After the newspaper closed in 1923, he bounced through a series of news jobs with the Associated Press, the Philadelphia Bulletin, The Morning World, The Morning Telegraph, The New York Bulletin and The Leader. In 1927, Sullivan joined The New York Evening Graphic, first as a sports writer and then as a sports editor.

In 1929, when Walter Winchell moved to The Daily Mirror, Sullivan was named the New York Evening Graphic's Broadway columnist. He left the paper for the city's largest tabloid, the New York Daily News. His column, "Little Old New York", concentrated on Broadway shows and gossip, and Sullivan also delivered show business news broadcasts on radio. In 1933, Sullivan wrote and starred in the film Mr. Broadway, in which he guided the audience around New York nightspots to meet entertainers and celebrities. Sullivan soon became a powerful force in the entertainment world and one of Winchell's main rivals, setting the El Morocco nightclub in New York as his unofficial headquarters against Winchell's seat of power at the nearby Stork Club. Sullivan continued writing for the New York Daily News throughout his broadcasting career, and his popularity long outlived that of Winchell. In the late 1960s, Sullivan praised Winchell's legacy in a magazine interview, leading to a major reconciliation between the longtime adversaries.

Throughout his career as a columnist, Sullivan had dabbled in entertainment, producing vaudeville shows with which he appeared as master of ceremonies in the 1920s and 1930s, directing a radio program over the original WABC and organizing benefit reviews for various causes.

== Radio ==
In 1941, Sullivan became host of the Summer Silver Theater, a variety program on CBS, with Will Bradley as bandleader and a guest star featured each week.

== Television ==
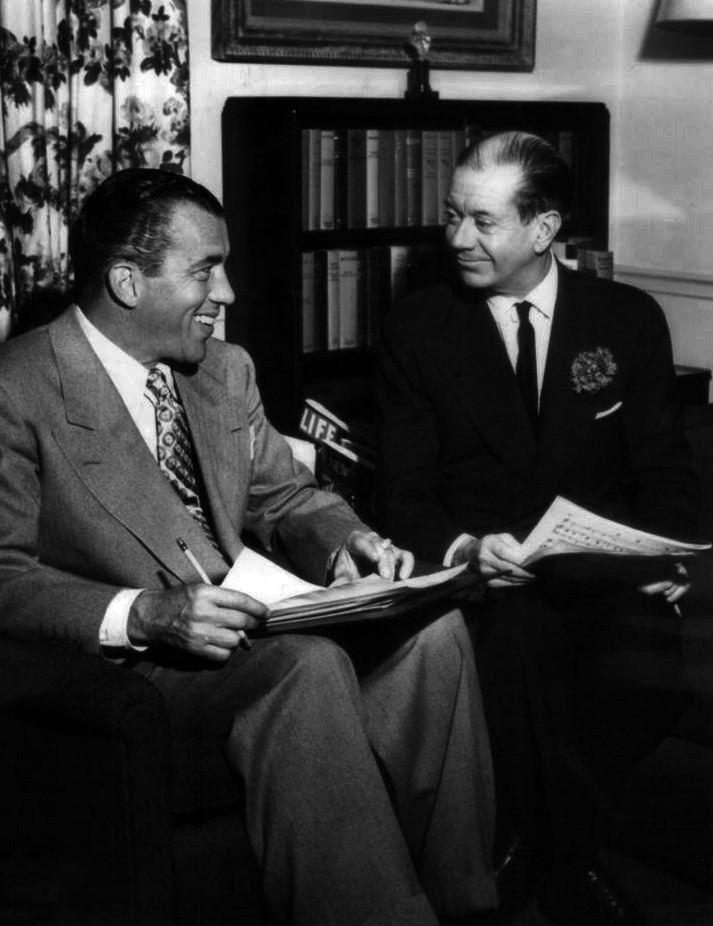
Sullivan with Cole Porter on Toast of the Town, 1952

In 1948, producer Marlo Lewis convinced CBS to hire Sullivan to host a weekly Sunday-night television variety show, Toast of the Town, which later became The Ed Sullivan Show. Debuting in June 1948, the show was originally broadcast from Maxine Elliott's Theatre on West 39th Street in New York. In January 1953, it moved to CBS-TV Studio 50 at 1697 Broadway, a former CBS Radio playhouse that in 1967 was renamed the Ed Sullivan Theater (and was later the home of the Late Show with David Letterman and The Late Show with Stephen Colbert).

Television critics gave the new show and its host poor reviews. Harriet Van Horne alleged that "he got where he is not by having a personality, but by having no personality." (The host wrote to the critic, "Dear Miss Van Horne: You bitch. Sincerely, Ed Sullivan.") Sullivan had little acting ability; in 1967, 20 years after his show's debut, Time magazine asked, "What exactly is Ed Sullivan's talent?" His mannerisms on camera were so awkward that some viewers believed the host suffered from Bell's palsy. Time in 1955 stated that Sullivan resembled "a cigar-store Indian, the Cardiff Giant and a stone-faced monument just off the boat from Easter Island. He moves like a sleepwalker; his smile is that of a man sucking a lemon; his speech is frequently lost in a thicket of syntax; his eyes pop from their sockets or sink so deep in their bags that they seem to be peering up at the camera from the bottom of twin wells."

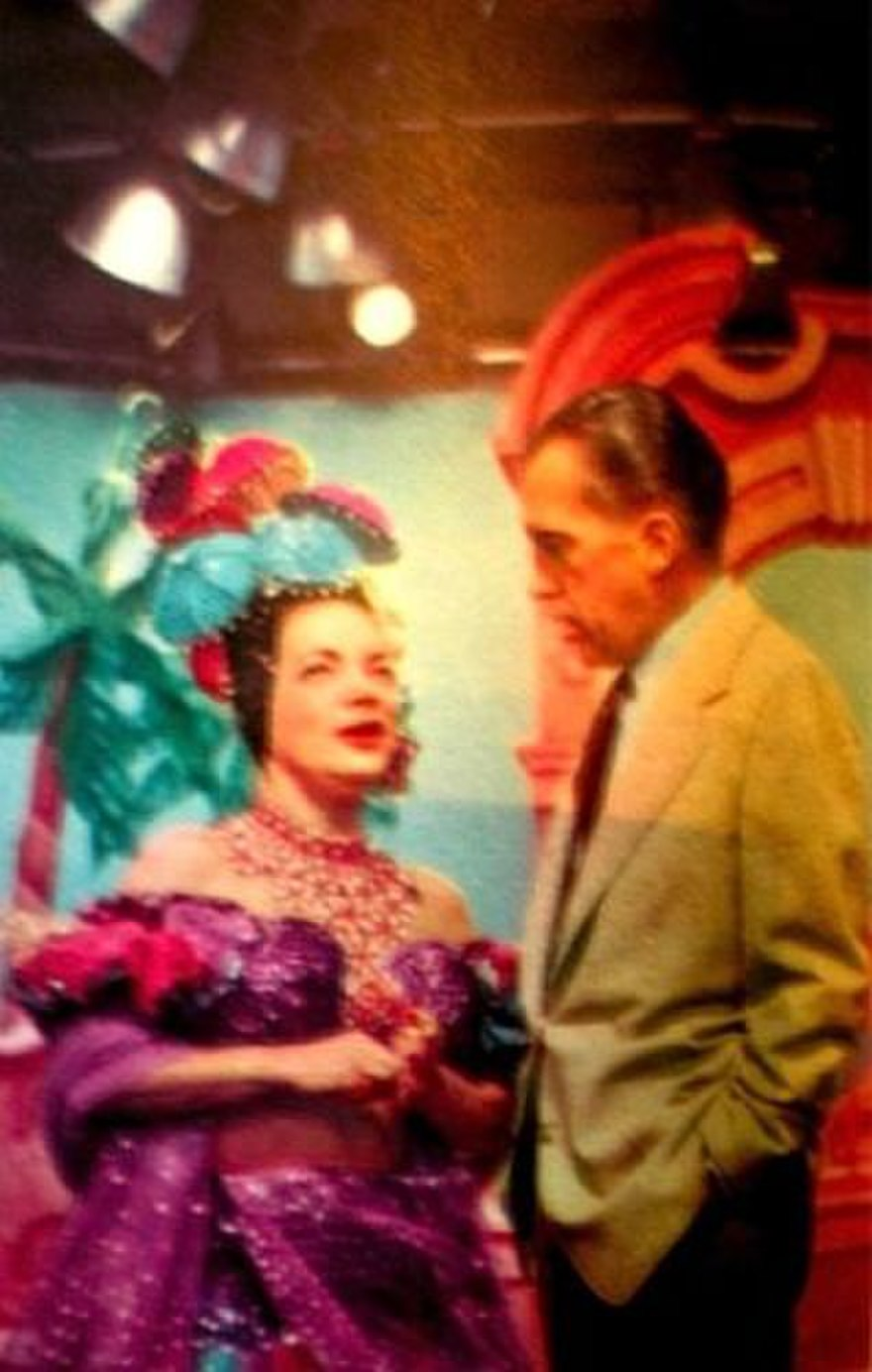
Carmen Miranda on Toast of the Town, 1953

"Yet," the magazine concluded, "instead of frightening children, Ed Sullivan charms the whole family." Sullivan appeared to the audience as an average guy who brought the great acts of show business to their home televisions. "Ed Sullivan will last", comedian Fred Allen said, "as long as someone else has talent." Frequent guest Alan King said, "Ed does nothing, but he does it better than anyone else in television." A typical show would feature a vaudeville act (such as acrobats, jugglers or magicians), one or two popular comedians, a singing star, a figure from the legitimate theater, an appearance by puppet Topo Gigio or a popular athlete. The bill was often international in scope, with many European performers appearing along with the American artists.

Sullivan had a healthy sense of humor about himself and permitted and even encouraged impersonators such as John Byner, Frank Gorshin, Rich Little and especially Will Jordan to imitate him on his show. Johnny Carson also performed a fair impression, and even Joan Rivers imitated Sullivan's unique posture. The impressionists exaggerated his stiffness, raised shoulders and nasal tenor phrasing, along with some of his commonly used introductions, such as "And now, right here on our stage ...", "For all you youngsters out there ..." and "a really big shew" (his pronunciation of the word "show"). Sullivan never actually spoke the phrase "really big show" during the opening introduction of any episode in the entire history of the series. Jordan portrayed Sullivan in the films I Wanna Hold Your Hand, The Buddy Holly Story, The Doors, Mr. Saturday Night, Down with Love and in the 1979 television movie Elvis.

Sullivan played himself, parodying his mannerisms as directed by Jerry Lewis, in Lewis' 1964 film The Patsy.

Sullivan inspired a song in the musical Bye Bye Birdie and in 1963 appeared as himself in the film.

In 1954, Sullivan appeared as a cohost on the television musical special General Foods 25th Anniversary Show: A Salute to Rodgers and Hammerstein.

== Legacy ==
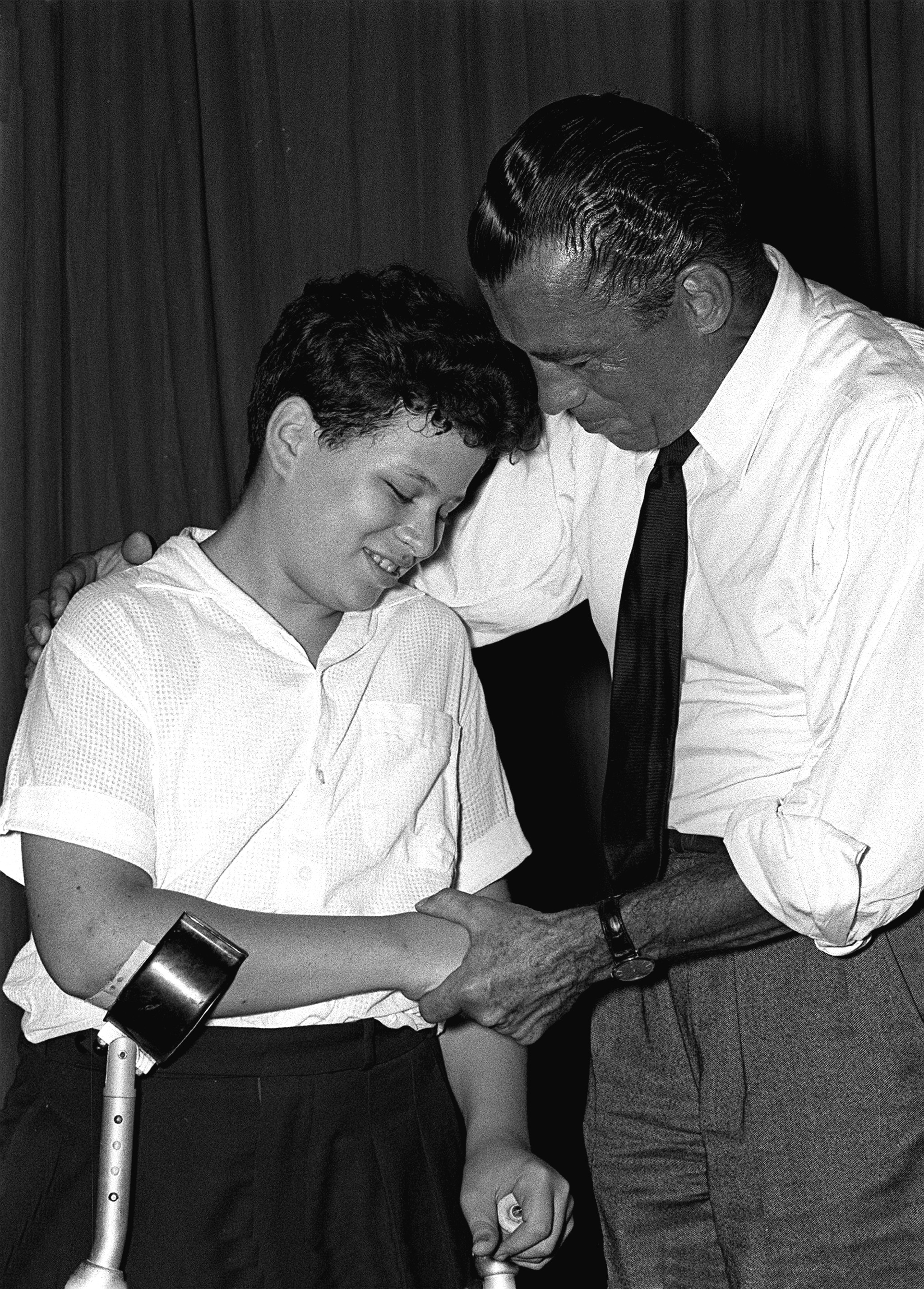
Sullivan congratulates 13-year-old Itzhak Perlman after a concert in Tel Aviv, 1958.

Sullivan was quoted as saying: "In the conduct of my own show, I've never asked a performer his religion, his race or his politics. Performers are engaged on the basis of their abilities. I believe that this is another quality of our show that has helped win it a wide and loyal audience." Although Sullivan was wary of Elvis Presley's image and initially said that he would never book him, Presley became too big a name to ignore; in 1956, Sullivan signed him for three appearances. Six weeks earlier in August 1956, Sullivan and the show's producer Robert Precht (who was also Sullivan's son-in-law) were in a near fatal car accident near Sullivan's country home in Southbury, Connecticut, and missed Presley's first appearance on September 9, when Charles Laughton introduced Presley. After Sullivan came to know Presley personally, he made amends by telling his audience, "This is a real decent, fine boy."

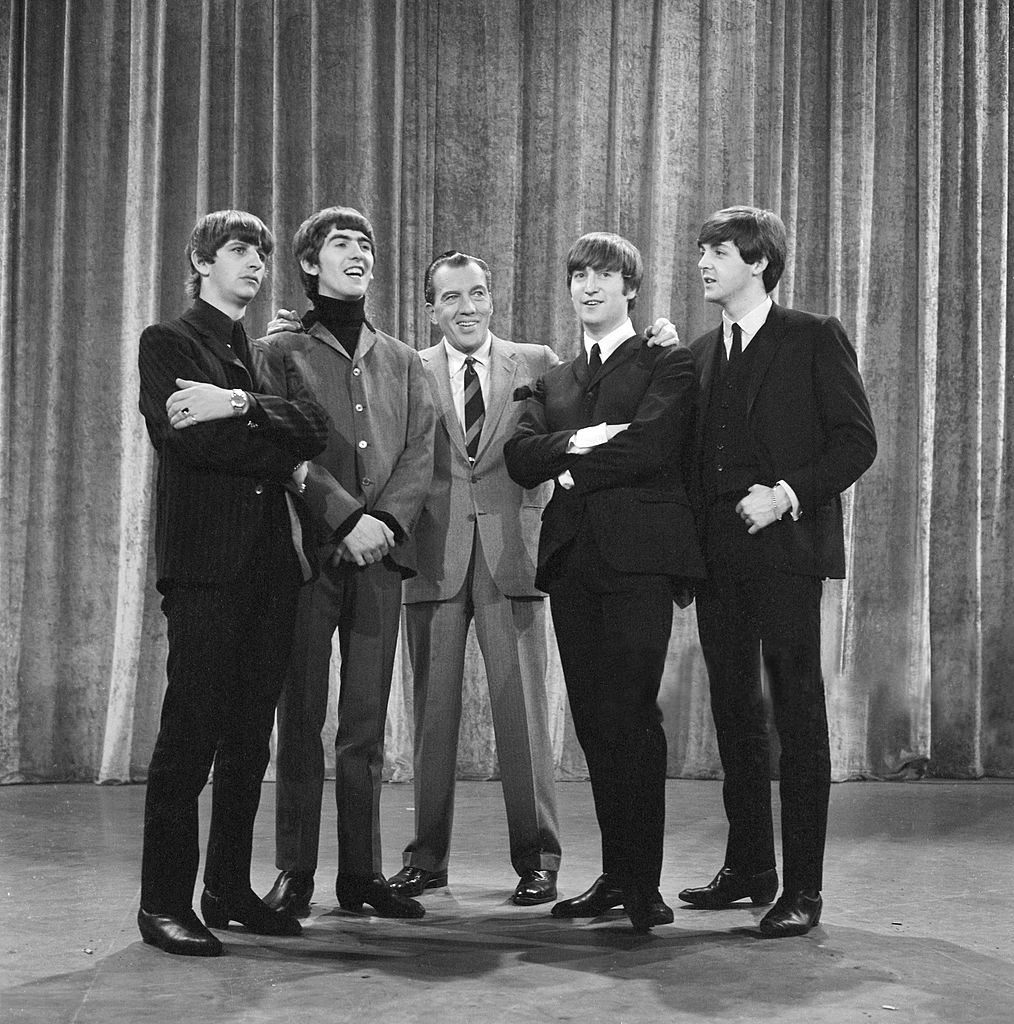
Sullivan with The Beatles, 1964

Sullivan's failure to scoop the TV industry with Presley made him determined to book the next big sensation first. In November 1963, while at Heathrow Airport, Sullivan witnessed the Beatlemania spectacle as the band returned from Sweden and the terminal was overrun by screaming teens. At first Sullivan was reluctant to book the Beatles because the band did not yet have a commercially successful single in the U.S., but at the behest of his friend Sid Bernstein, Sullivan signed the group. Their initial Sullivan show appearance on February 9, 1964, was the most-watched program in TV history to that point. The Beatles appeared three more times in person and submitted filmed performances afterwards. The Dave Clark Five, who claimed a "cleaner" image than the Beatles, made 13 appearances on the show, more than any other UK group.

Unlike many shows of the time, Sullivan asked that most musical acts perform their music live, rather than lip-synching to their recordings. However, exceptions were made, such as when a microphone could not be placed close enough to a performer for technical reasons. An example was B. J. Thomas' 1969 performance of "Raindrops Keep Fallin' on My Head", in which water was sprinkled on him as a special effect. In 1969, Sullivan presented the Jackson 5 with their first single "I Want You Back", which ousted Thomas' song from the top spot of the Billboard Hot 100.

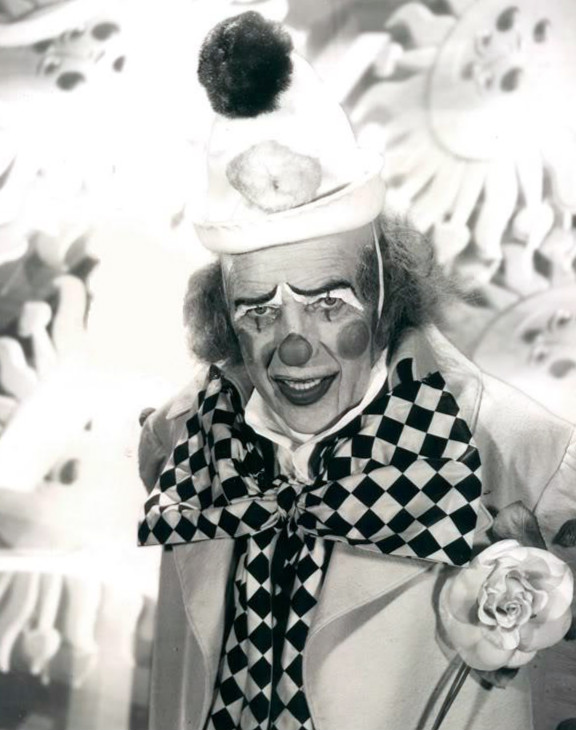
Sullivan, in full clown regalia, hosting the 1972 special Clownaround

Sullivan had an appreciation for Black entertainers. According to biographer Gerald Nachman, "Most TV variety shows welcomed 'acceptable' [B]lack superstars like Louis Armstrong, Pearl Bailey and Sammy Davis Jr. ... but in the early 1950s, long before it was fashionable, Sullivan was presenting the much more obscure [B]lack entertainers he had enjoyed in Harlem on his uptown rounds — legends like Peg Leg Bates, Pigmeat Markham and Tim Moore ... strangers to white America." He hosted pioneering TV appearances by Bo Diddley, the Platters, Brook Benton, Jackie Wilson, Fats Domino and numerous Motown acts including the Supremes, who appeared 17 times. As the critic John Leonard wrote, "There wasn't an important [B]lack artist who didn't appear on Ed's show."

Sullivan defied pressure to exclude Black entertainers or to avoid interacting with them on screen. "Sullivan had to fend off his hard-won sponsor, Ford's Lincoln dealers, after kissing Pearl Bailey on the cheek and daring to shake Nat King Cole's hand," Nachman wrote. According to biographer Jerry Bowles, "Sullivan once had a Ford executive thrown out of the theatre when he suggested that Sullivan stop booking so many [B]lack acts. And a dealer in Cleveland told him 'We realize that you got to have niggers on your show. But do you have to put your arm around Bill 'Bojangles' Robinson at the end of his dance?' Sullivan had to be physically restrained from beating the man to a pulp." Sullivan later raised money to help pay for Robinson's funeral. At a CBS affiliates meeting in the late 1950s, several Southern station managers complained that Sullivan was booking too many "negroes". Furious, Sullivan referred to the comments in his presentation and said that any station manager that feels this way is under no obligation to carry the show. There were no cancellations. Sullivan said: "As a Catholic, it was inevitable that I would despise intolerance, because Catholics suffered more than their share of it. As I grew up, the causes of minorities were part and parcel of me. Negroes and Jews were the minority causes closest at hand. I need no urging to take a plunge in and help."

At a time when television had not yet embraced country and western music, Sullivan featured Nashville performers on his program. This in turn paved the way for shows such as Hee Haw and variety shows hosted by Johnny Cash, Glen Campbell and other country singers.

The Canadian comedy duo Wayne and Shuster made the most appearances of any act throughout the show's run with 67 appearances between 1958 and 1969.

Sullivan appeared as himself on other television programs, including an April 1958 episode of the Howard Duff and Ida Lupino CBS situation comedy Mr. Adams and Eve. On September 14, 1958, Sullivan appeared on What's My Line? as a mystery guest. In 1961, Sullivan substituted for Red Skelton on The Red Skelton Show. Sullivan took Skelton's roles in the various comedy sketches, with Skelton's hobo character Freddie the Freeloader renamed Eddie the Freeloader.

== Personality ==
Sullivan was quick to take offense if he felt that he had been crossed, and he could hold a grudge for a long time. As he told biographer Gerald Nachman, "I'm a pop-off. I flare up, then I go around apologizing." "Armed with an Irish temper and thin skin," wrote Nachman, "Ed brought to his feuds a hunger for combat fed by his coverage of, and devotion to, boxing." Bo Diddley, Buddy Holly, Jackie Mason, and Jim Morrison were parties to some of Sullivan's most storied conflicts.

On November 20, 1955, rock 'n' roll singer and guitarist Bo Diddley appeared on The Ed Sullivan Show, only to infuriate Sullivan. A reporter who was there at the time described what happened: "Controversy raged at the CBS Studio 57, last Sunday ... in a verbal battle that started over one of the performer's refusal to do a number on the telecast which Sullivan had requested. During the dress rehearsal, Bo Diddley ... agreed to do "Sixteen Tons," as Marlo Lewis, Toast of the Town's Executive Producer and Sullivan had requested. However, at 8:29 PM, as Sullivan went into commercial, the folk singer hurried to the side of Ray Block, musical director, to announce he had 'changed his mind' and was going to do "Diddley Daddy". After several attempts to get him to change his mind, CBS brass went into a hurried conference in attempt to synchronize the timing of the show with the longer number." Sullivan was enraged: "You're the first black boy that ever double-crossed me on the show," Diddley quoted him as saying. "We didn't have much to do with each other after that," he added. Later, Diddley resented that Elvis Presley, whom he accused of copying his revolutionary style and beat, received the attention and accolades on Sullivan's show that he felt were rightfully his. "I am owed," he said, "and I never got paid." "He might have," wrote Nachman, "had things gone smoother with Sullivan."

Buddy Holly and the Crickets first appeared on the Sullivan show in 1957 to an enthusiastic response. For their second appearance in January 1958, Sullivan considered the lyrics of their chosen number "Oh, Boy!" "too wild", and ordered Holly to substitute another song. Holly responded that he had already told his hometown friends in Texas that he would be singing "Oh, Boy!" for them. Sullivan, unaccustomed to having his instructions questioned, angrily repeated them, but Holly refused to back down. Drummer Jerry Allison remembered what happened as air time approached:

It was during the dress rehearsal. Joe B. [Mauldin, the bass player] and I were wrestling or goofing around somewhere down in the basement. All of a sudden, they struck the set scheduled before us and we were supposed to go on. Sullivan announced us but Buddy just came out alone with his guitar. Ed said, "Where are the others?" and Buddy said, "I don't know -- no telling!" Finally we got up there, but Ed Sullivan was turned completely off. We were supposed to do two songs that night, and two minutes before the show was over, we were still standing there waiting to go on. So we just got time to do one song. And the lighting was bad -- you couldn't even see Joe B. and myself, you could just see Buddy -- and the sound was terrible, too, and it was like they did that on purpose. It was really a drag -- made us look awful.

Sullivan deliberately mispronounced Holly's name during the introduction. He also saw to it that Holly's guitar amplifier volume was barely audible, except during his guitar solo. Nevertheless, the band was so well received that Sullivan was forced to invite them back; Holly responded that Sullivan did not have enough money. Archival photographs taken during the appearance show Holly smirking and ignoring a visibly angry Sullivan.

During Jackie Mason's October 1964 performance on a show that had been shortened by ten minutes due to an address by President Lyndon Johnson, Sullivan—on-stage but off-camera—signaled Mason that he had two minutes left by holding up two fingers. Sullivan's signal distracted the studio audience, and to television viewers unaware of the circumstances, it seemed as though Mason's jokes were falling flat. Mason, in a bid to regain the audience's attention, cried, "I'm getting fingers here!" and made his own frantic hand gesture: "Here's a finger for you!" Videotapes of the incident are inconclusive as to whether Mason's upswept hand (which was just off-camera) was intended to be an indecent gesture, but Sullivan was convinced that it was, and banned Mason from future appearances on the program. Mason later said that he did not know what the "middle finger" meant, and that he did not make the gesture anyway. In September 1965, Sullivan—who, according to Mason, was "deeply apologetic"—brought Mason on the show for a "surprise grand reunion". "He said they were old pals," Nachman wrote, "news to Mason, who never got a repeat invitation." Mason added that his earning power "... was cut right in half after that. I never really worked my way back until I opened on Broadway in 1986."

When the Byrds performed on December 12, 1965, David Crosby got into a shouting match with the show's director. They were never asked to return.

Sullivan decided that "Girl, we couldn't get much higher", from the Doors' signature song "Light My Fire", was too overt a reference to drug use, and directed that the lyric be changed to "Girl, we couldn't get much better" for the group's September 1967 appearance. The band members "nodded their assent", according to Doors biographer Ben Fong-Torres, then sang the song as written. After the broadcast, producer Bob Precht told the group, "Mr. Sullivan wanted you for six more shows, but you'll never work the Ed Sullivan Show again." Jim Morrison replied, "Hey, man, we just did the Ed Sullivan Show."

The Rolling Stones famously capitulated during their fifth appearance on the show, in 1967, when Mick Jagger was told to change the titular lyric of "Let's Spend the Night Together" to "Let's spend some time together". "But Jagger prevailed," wrote Nachman, by deliberately calling attention to the censorship, rolling his eyes, mugging, and drawing out the word "t-i-i-i-me" as he sang the revised lyric. Sullivan was angered by the insubordination, but the Stones did make one additional appearance on the show, in 1969.

Moe Howard of the Three Stooges recalled in 1975 that Sullivan had a memory problem of sorts: "Ed was a very nice man, but for a showman, quite forgetful. On our first appearance, he introduced us as the Three Ritz Brothers. He got out of it by adding, 'who look more like the Three Stooges to me'." Joe DeRita, who worked with the Stooges after 1959, had commented that Sullivan had a personality "like the bottom of a bird cage."

Diana Ross, who was very fond of Sullivan, later recalled Sullivan's forgetfulness during the many occasions the Supremes performed on his show. In a 1995 appearance on the Late Show with David Letterman (taped in the Ed Sullivan Theater), Ross stated, "he could never remember our names. He called us 'the girls'."

In a 1990 press conference, Paul McCartney recalled meeting Sullivan again in the early 1970s. Sullivan apparently had no idea who McCartney was. McCartney tried to remind Sullivan that he was one of the Beatles, but Sullivan obviously could not remember, and nodding and smiling, simply shook McCartney's hand and left. In an interview with Howard Stern around 2012, Joan Rivers said that Sullivan had been suffering from dementia toward the end of his life.

== Politics ==
Sullivan, like many American entertainers, supported the Cold War anticommunism of the late 1940s and 1950s. Tap dancer Paul Draper's scheduled January 1950 appearance on Toast of the Town met with opposition from Hester McCullough, an activist in the hunt for what she perceived as subversives. Branding Draper a Communist Party sympathizer, she demanded that Sullivan's lead sponsor, the Ford Motor Company, cancel Draper's appearance. Draper denied the charge, and appeared on the show as scheduled. Ford received over a thousand angry letters and telegrams, and Sullivan was obliged to promise Ford's advertising agency, Kenyon & Eckhardt, that he would avoid controversial guests going forward. Draper was forced to move to Europe to earn a living.

After the Draper incident, Sullivan began to work closely with Theodore Kirkpatrick of the anti-Communist Counterattack newsletter. He would consult Kirkpatrick if any questions came up regarding a potential guest's political leanings. Sullivan wrote in his June 21, 1950, Daily News column that "Kirkpatrick has sat in my living room on several occasions and listened attentively to performers eager to secure a certification of loyalty."

Cold War repercussions manifested in a different way when Bob Dylan was booked to appear in May 1963. His chosen song was "Talkin' John Birch Paranoid Blues", which poked fun at the ultraconservative John Birch Society and its tendency to see Communist conspiracies in many situations. No concern was voiced by anyone, including Sullivan, during rehearsals; but on the day of the broadcast, CBS's Standards and Practices department rejected the song, fearing that lyrics equating the Society's views with those of Adolf Hitler might trigger a defamation lawsuit. Dylan was offered the opportunity to perform a different song, but he responded that if he could not sing the number of his choice, he would rather not appear at all. The story generated widespread media attention in the days that followed. Sullivan denounced the network's decision in published interviews.

Sullivan had disagreements with Standards and Practices on other occasions, as well. In 1956, actress Ingrid Bergman was planning a return to Hollywood with the film Anastasia after living in exile in Europe since 1950 in the wake of her scandalous love affair with director Roberto Rossellini. Sullivan was confident that the American public would welcome her back, and invited her to appear on his show. He flew to Europe to film an interview with Bergman, Yul Brynner, and Helen Hayes on the Anastasia set. When Sullivan arrived back in New York, Standards and Practices informed him that under no circumstances would Bergman be permitted to appear on the show, either live or on film. However, Sullivan's prediction about Bergman's career later proved correct, as she won her second Academy Award for Anastasia, as well as the forgiveness of her fans.

== Personal life ==
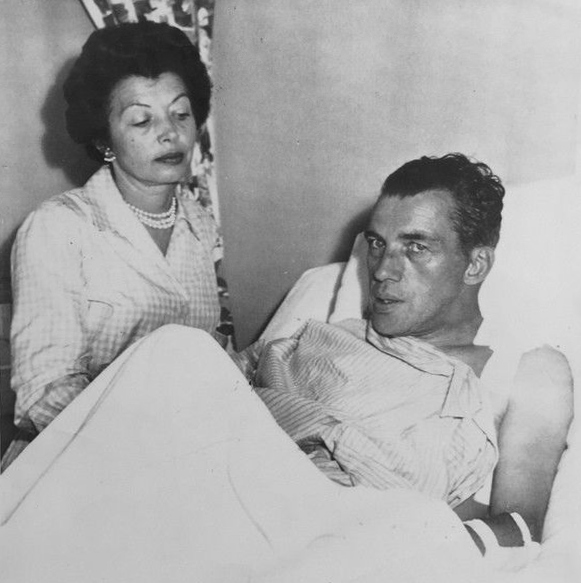
Sullivan with his wife Sylvia during his convalescence at Griffin Hospital, 1956

Sullivan was engaged to champion swimmer Sybil Bauer, but she died of cancer in 1927 at the age of 23.

In 1926, Sullivan met and began dating Sylvia Weinstein. Initially she told her family that she was dating a Jewish man named Ed Solomon, but her brother discovered it was Sullivan, who was Catholic. Both their families were strongly opposed to interfaith marriage, which resulted in a discontinuous relationship for the next three years. They were finally married on April 28, 1930, in a City Hall ceremony. Eight months later Sylvia gave birth to Elizabeth ("Betty"), named after Sullivan's mother, who had died that year. In 1952, Betty Sullivan married the Ed Sullivan Show's producer, Bob Precht.

In 1956, Sullivan was in an automobile accident that broke several ribs, and knocked out his teeth, changing his appearance. He also suffered from a stomach ulcer, which was aggravated by smoking and drinking alcohol.

The Sullivans rented a suite of rooms at the Hotel Delmonico in 1944 after living at the Hotel Astor on Times Square for many years. Sullivan rented a suite next door to the family suite, which he used as an office until The Ed Sullivan Show was canceled in 1971. Sullivan habitually called his wife after every program to get her critique.

The Sullivans regularly dined and socialized at New York City's best-known clubs and restaurants including the Stork Club, Danny's Hide-A-Way, and Jimmy Kelly's. His friends included celebrities and U.S. presidents. He also received audiences with popes.

Sylvia Sullivan was a financial advisor for her husband. She died on March 16, 1973, at Mount Sinai Hospital from a ruptured aorta.

== Later life and death ==
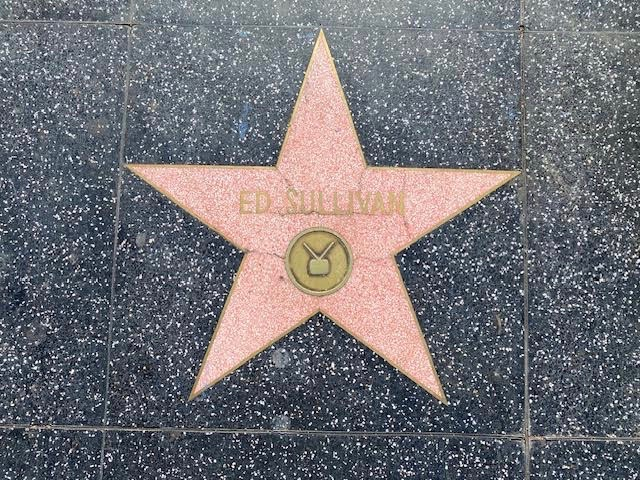
Sullivan's star on the Hollywood Walk of Fame.

In the fall of 1965, CBS began televising its weekly programs in color. Although the Sullivan show was seen live in the Central and Eastern time zones, it was taped for airing in the Pacific and Mountain time zones.

By 1971, the show's ratings had plummeted. In an effort to refresh the CBS lineup, CBS cancelled the program in March 1971, along with some of its other long-running shows throughout the 1970–1971 season (later known as the rural purge). Angered, Sullivan refused to host three more months of scheduled shows. They were replaced by special Sullivan episodes with guest hosts until May 1971, followed by reruns until June, with Sullivan taping a final tag in the last episode rerun, announcing the show's departure from its Sunday night slot. He remained with the network in various other capacities and hosted a 25th anniversary special in June 1973.

In early September 1974, Sullivan was diagnosed with an advanced stage of esophageal cancer. Sullivan, a lifelong smoker, believed his ailment to be yet another complication from a long-standing battle with gastric ulcers. He died on October 13, 1974, at New York's Lenox Hill Hospital. His funeral was attended by 2,000 people at St. Patrick's Cathedral, New York, on a cold, rainy day. Sullivan is interred in a crypt at the Ferncliff Cemetery in Hartsdale, New York.

Sullivan has a star on the Hollywood Walk of Fame at 6101 Hollywood Boulevard. In 1985, Sullivan was welcomed to the Television Academy Hall of Fame. In 2026, Sullivan was welcomed to the Rock and Roll Hall of Fame.

== See also ==
- List of people from Harlem
