= Marlo Lewis =

American television producer (1915–1993)

- Born: September 15, 1915; Illinois, U.S.
- Died: June 8, 1993 (aged 77); Palm Springs, California, U.S.
- Occupations: Actor, producer
- Years active: 1948–1993
- Children: 2
- Relatives: Monica Lewis (sister); Jennings Lang (brother-in-law)

Marlo Lewis (September 15, 1915 – June 8, 1993) was an American executive producer of variety and comedy shows for CBS and is well known for co-producing the Ed Sullivan Show.

== Early life ==
Lewis was the son of a concert pianist and an opera singer. In the mid-1940s he became an executive of the Blaine Thompson Advertising agency, where he created and produced, together with his wife, Mina Bess, the daily radio talk show Luncheon at Sardi's.

== Ed Sullivan ==
In 1948 Lewis co-created the Toast of the Town program with Ed Sullivan. In 1955, the TV classic was renamed The Ed Sullivan Show. Together with Sullivan, Lewis personally set the appearance time of each act for the show. On 9 September 1956, Elvis Presley appeared for the first time on the show, but on his third and last appearance on January 6, 1957 he was censored because the rumor had it that the rock'n'roll singer had been "hanging a small soft-drink bottle from his groin underneath his pants, and when he wiggles his leg it looks as though his pecker reaches down to his knee!" Therefore, Lewis and Sullivan decided to shoot the singer only from the waist up during this, his last performance on their show.

== Other shows ==
Apart from this show, Lewis also helped to launch The Jackie Gleason Show, The Dinah Shore Show, and The Phil Silvers Show.

After 12 years, he left the Sullivan Show in order to set up an independent production company. One of his first projects was the ballet The Nutcracker for an ABC Christmas special in 1961. In the mid-1960s, he produced several musical specials for Perry Como.

In 1967, Lewis joined the Norman, Craig & Kummel agency and was elected vice chairman a year later.

== Publication ==
In 1979, Lewis published, together with his wife, a book titled Prime Time which includes many backstage stories from the author's time as a producer.

== Awards ==
Lewis was a founder of the Academy of Television Arts and Sciences. Both Lewis and Sullivan shared the George Foster Peabody Award for humanitarian activities. In 1992, Lewis was elected to the Television Producers Hall of Fame.

== Death ==
In 1993, Lewis died of heart failure at a hospital in Palm Springs, California.
