= Michael Lang (musician) =

American musical artist (1941–2022)

- Also known as: Michael Anthony Lang
- Born: Michael Herbert Lang; December 10, 1941; Los Angeles, California, U.S.
- Died: August 5, 2022 (aged 80)
- Genres: Jazz; classical music; R&B; pop rock
- Occupations: Musician; songwriter
- Instrument: Keyboards
- Years active: 1964–2022

Michael Anthony Lang (born Michael Herbert Lang; December 10, 1941 – August 5, 2022) was an American pianist and composer, who was recognized for his highly prolific career as a pianist on more than 2500 film scores.

== Early life and career ==
Lang was one of two sons born to publicists Jennings Lang and Flora Pam Friedheim. (Note: The niece and erstwhile manager of comedian Hugh Herbert, Friedheim had been known professionally as Flora Pam.) He was also raised in part by his stepmother, singer Monica Lewis, beginning in 1956, four years after the premature death of his birth mother. Lang obtained a bachelor of music at the University of Michigan in 1963, and studied under Leonard Stein, George Tremblay, Pearl Kaufman, and Lalo Schifrin.

Lang spent several decades as one of the premier musical talents in Los Angeles. He was well versed in various music forms, including jazz, classical, pop and R&B. He was both a freelance jazz musician and sought-after studio musician, with a career spanning records, motion pictures and television. A three-time winner of the "MVP" Grammy Award from NARAS and recipient of numerous Gold Records, Lang was conversant with many music idioms and forms. This versatility enabled him to build career as an accompanist for a large body of artists including Ray Charles, Natalie Cole, Ella Fitzgerald, Aretha Franklin, Marvin Gaye, Vince Gill, NSYNC, Milt Jackson, Lee Konitz, Diana Krall, John Lennon, Arturo Sandoval, Barbra Streisand, Josh Groban, and Frank Zappa. He also played with some of the biggest names in jazz, such as Lee Ritenour, Oliver Nelson, Bud Shank, Don Ellis, Shelly Manne and Stan Kenton.

He recorded more than 2,500 scores, working with virtually every major film composer including John Williams, Jerry Goldsmith, James Newton Howard, Henry Mancini, John Barry, Elmer Bernstein, John Debney, Michael Kamen, Hans Zimmer, with numerous screen credits for solo appearances. He premiered jazz piano concerti written especially for him by Byron Olson and Brad Dechter as well as a piano work by Kevin Kaska written for him and the Royal Scottish National Orchestra. Lang wrote songs for jazz notables including Stan Getz, Herb Alpert, and Dave Grusin and recorded a jazz CD entitled Days of Wine and Roses: The Classic Songs of Henry Mancini.

Lang's motion picture credits include: Oblivion, Dreamer, As Good As It Gets, The Edge, Mr. Holland's Opus, The Mummy: Tomb of the Dragon, Memoirs Of A Geisha, A Dog Year, Seven Pounds, The Day the Earth Stood Still, High School Musical 3: Senior Year, Bedtime Stories, Public Enemies, Confessions of a Shopaholic, Hannah Montana: The Movie, A Thousand Words, The Forlorn, They Came from Upstairs, A League of Their Own, The Russia House, Arachnophobia, Twilight Zone: The Movie, Black Sunday, The Towering Inferno, The Paper Chase, The Poseidon Adventure, and Close Encounters of the Third Kind.

Lang recorded numerous albums with Barbra Streisand, Vanessa Williams, Russell Watson, and Michael Bolton. His television work includes The Simpsons, Family Guy, Privileged, American Dad, The Orville, and The Secret Life of the American Teenager.

== Selective discography ==
With Robbie Williams

- Swings Both Ways (Island Records, 2013)

With John Lennon

- Rock 'n' Roll (John Lennon album) (Apple, 1975)

With Sarah Vaughan

- Songs of The Beatles (Atlantic Records, 1981)

With Dusty Springfield

- Cameo (ABC Records, 1973)

With Solomon Burke

- Like a Fire (Shout! Factory, 2008)

With Tom Waits

- Heartattack and Vine (Asylum Records, 1980)

With Peggy Lee

- Mirrors (A&M Records, 1975)

With José Feliciano

- José Feliciano (Motown, 1981)

With Vince Gill

- Breath of Heaven: A Christmas Collection (MCA Records, 1998)

With Bette Midler

- Bette Midler Sings the Peggy Lee Songbook (Columbia Records, 2005)

With Kenny Rogers

- We've Got Tonight (Liberty Records, 1983)

With Aretha Franklin

- Aretha (Arista Records, 1980)

With Willie Nelson

- Healing Hands of Time (Capitol Records, 1994)

With Natalie Cole

- Unforgettable... with Love (Elektra Records, 1991)
- Stardust (Elektra Records, 1996)

With Amy Grant

- A Christmas to Remember (A&M Records, 1999)

With Paul Anka

- Rock Swings (Verve, 2005)
- Songs Of December (Decca Records, 2012)

With Melissa Manchester

- If My Heart Had Wings (Atlantic Records, 1995)

With Neil Diamond

- Heartlight (Columbia Records, 1982)

With Michael Bolton

- This Is The Time: The Christmas Album (Columbia Records, 1996)

With Barry Manilow

- Manilow Sings Sinatra (Arista Records, 1998)

With Carole Bayer Sager

- Sometimes Late at Night (The Boardwalk Entertainment, 1981)

With Barbra Streisand

- Wet (Columbia Records, 1979)
- Back to Broadway (Columbia Records, 1993)
- A Love Like Ours (Columbia Records, 1999)
- Christmas Memories (Columbia Records, 2001)
- The Movie Album (Columbia Records, 2003)
- Encore: Movie Partners Sing Broadway (Columbia Records, 2016)
