= Kay Brown (singer) =

American singer (1933–2022)

- Born: Dolores Kay Brown; July 2, 1933; Peoria, Illinois
- Died: January 2, 2022 (aged 88); Lund, Nevada
- Occupations: singer, actress
- Musical career
- Genres: Jazz; traditional pop; rock'n'roll
- Labels: Mercury; Crown; Decca

Kay Brown (full name Dolores Kay Brown, July 2, 1933 – January 2, 2022) was an American singer who recorded for Mercury and Decca in the 1950s.

She notably acted in the 1951 movie The Strip and sang the song "A Kiss to Build a Dream On" in it.

== Personal life ==
In the early 1950s she notably dated Mickey Rooney, whom she had appeared with as an unrequited love interest in the 1951 film The Strip.

Brown was married to bandleader Maynard Ferguson for two years in the 1950s. On March 10, 1972, she married Brent Lyon Wood.
