= The Strip (film) =

1951 film by László Kardos

- Theatrical release poster
- Directed by: László Kardos
- Written by: Allen Rivkin
- Produced by: Joe Pasternak
- Starring: Mickey Rooney; Sally Forrest; William Demarest; James Craig
- Cinematography: Robert L. Surtees
- Edited by: Albert Akst
- Music by: Pete Rugolo; George Stoll
- Production company: Metro-Goldwyn-Mayer
- Distributed by: Loew's, Inc
- Release date: August 31, 1951 (United States)
- Running time: 85 minutes
- Country: United States
- Language: English
- Budget: $885,000
- Box office: $982,000

The Strip is a 1951 American crime film noir starring Mickey Rooney and Sally Forrest, with William Demarest, James Craig, and Kay Brown in supporting roles. Directed by László Kardos, the picture was shot largely on location in and around the Sunset Strip, including performances at the popular nightclubs Mocambo and Ciro's and scenes at the restaurants Little Hungary and Stripps.

A large part of the film's running time consists of musical numbers played by the "house band," which includes jazz legends Louis Armstrong, Jack Teagarden, Barney Bigard, Earl "Fatha" Hines (all playing themselves), and Rooney himself on drums, as well as songs at other clubs by Vic Damone and Monica Lewis.

== Plot ==
A voiceover briefly describes the Sunset Strip, its clubs, and its unusual status as an unincorporated area of Los Angeles County patrolled by its sheriffs. Police officers are seen going to an apartment building where a young gunshot victim named Jane Tafford (Sally Forrest) lies near death. Two detectives then arrive at a home with the body of a man sprawled on its floor and a discarded pistol nearby. Soon after, they bring Stanley Maxton (Mickey Rooney) to headquarters for questioning.

Maxton explains he'd received extensive hospitalization for an unspecified condition following duty in the Korean War before heading home to Los Angeles, where he'd hoped to earn enough money as a jazz drummer to some day open his own club. He was accidentally forced off the road by a reckless driver, destroying his car and his brand-new drum set. To make things whole, the man offered Stanley a job at a very generous $200 per week. He could afford to: he was Sonny Johnson (James Craig), a top mobster in L.A.s gambling rackets, and the job was making book. Shortly, Stanley has expensive clothes, a fancy car, and a glitzy life in the underbelly of the criminal underworld. A police raid sends him fleeing on foot, then launching himself into the front seat of a passing car.

He is immediately smitten with Jane Tafford, the driver, an attractive aspiring actress working as a cigarette girl and dancer at Fluff's jazz nightclub. Stanley pursues her there, only to be met with a stone wall: she is obsessed with success, and seeing only the "right people" to advance her stalled movie career. Determined to wear her down, he seizes on a chance to join the house band - a Dixieland quintet fronted by its namesake owner (William Demarest), which includes Louis Armstrong, Jack Teagarden, Barney Bigard, and Earl "Fatha" Hines, all playing themselves. Sonny chides Stanley over the huge cut in pay, but accepts his resignation with good humor.

Stanley is a genuine talent, and immediately accepted by all. Although he and Jane go out together, she is clearly not interested in his plans to marry her and settle down. Desperate to make inroads, Stanley offers to introduce Jane to Sonny as someone who may be able to get her a screen test with a big Hollywood studio. The two immediately begin to date. Left in the lurch, Stanley grows increasingly jealous, stalking the couple day and night. To get rid of him, Sonny offers Stanley a lucrative position in Phoenix - and a one-way ticket departing immediately. When Stanley spurns two of Sonny's goons, then barges into Sonny's office to threaten his life if he doesn't leave Jane alone, Sonny has him worked over. Dazed, he heads to Fluff's and quits, saying his life is at stake if he doesn't make the move. The next thing he knows, he's being roused to be taken to the police station.

Back in the present, he is accused of following through on his threat to kill Sonny. He also learns that Jane is hospitalized in serious condition, likewise suspected of Sonny's murder. Trying to protect her, Stanley makes a full confession. However, some key details do not fit, turning the chief detective's attention back to Jane. After a break, he produces a signed confession revealing that she had gone to Sonny's place to confront him over Stanley's beating and his stall on advancing her movie career. In a struggle over his gun she was wounded, then accidentally shot him. The case is closed, and Stanley is free to go. He immediately seeks to see Jane, but is told she has died.

Grievously hurting, Stanley goes to Fluff's, where he is pointed toward his drums. A musician in his soul, he picks up his sticks and expresses his pain through his playing. Everyone there understands and welcomes him back.

== Cast ==
- Mickey Rooney as Stanley Maxton
- Sally Forrest as Jane Tafford
- William Demarest as Fluff
- James Craig as Delwyn "Sonny" Johnson
- Kay Brown as Edna
- Louis Armstrong as himself
- Tommy Rettig as Artie Ardrey
- Tom Powers as Detective Lt. Bonnabel
- Jonathan Cott as Behr
- Tommy Farrell as Boynton
- Myrna Dell as Paulette Ardrey
- Jacqueline Fontaine as Frieda
- Vic Damone as himself
- Monica Lewis as herself

== Production ==
The film is set against the backdrop of Hollywood's Sunset Strip, with Louis Armstrong, Earl Hines, Barney Bigard, and Jack Teagarden appearing as themselves and playing in the film. Pete Rugolo, who is credited with Leo Arnaud with the film's orchestrations, was a well-known jazz arranger.

Much of the picture was shot on location in and around the Sunset Strip. Interiors were shot at the popular nightclubs Mocambo and Ciro's and at the restaurants Little Hungary and Stripps.

== Reception ==
According to MGM records, the film made $656,000 in the US and Canada and $326,000 elsewhere, resulting in a loss of $284,000.

=== Critical response ===
Film critic Dennis Schwartz discussed the production in his review and praised the work of Mickey Rooney, "A minor mystery story that's given some high gloss in its production by the MGM studio system, as Louis "Satchmo" Armstrong and his distinguished band made up of Jack Teagarden, Earl "Fatha" Hines, and Barney Bigard serenade us with a few numbers and there are various other jazz pieces included from singers Monica Lewis and Vic Damone. It's set on the intriguing Sunset Strip where Mickey Rooney plays the sincere little guy, Stanley Maxton, a jazz drummer who is accused of murder ... The breezy story line, the snappy jazz interludes, and some engaging scenes made it very appealing ... Rooney is super as the perennial victim who only finds his soul when he's lost in his music. The film effectively captured the existential mood and the glee derived from the club scene on the Strip. It's an above-average mystery story that could be categorized as film noir because of Rooney's pained expression as a victim of love."

=== Accolades ===
The song "A Kiss to Build a Dream On" was nominated for an Academy Award for Best Song but lost to "In the Cool, Cool, Cool of the Evening," from the Paramount film Here Comes the Groom.

The film is recognized by American Film Institute in these lists:

- 2004: AFI's 100 Years...100 Songs:
  - "A Kiss to Build a Dream On" – Nominated
