= Jennings Lang =

American actor and film producer

- Born: May 28, 1915; New York City, New York, U.S.
- Died: May 29, 1996 (aged 81); Palm Desert, California, U.S.
- Occupations: Film producer, screenwriter, actor
- Spouse(s): Flora Pam Freidheim (m. 1940-1952; her death); 2 sons, Monica Lewis (m. 1956-1996; his death); 1 son
- Children: 3, including Michael Lang

Jennings Lang (May 28, 1915, New York City – May 29, 1996, Palm Desert, California) was an American film producer, screenwriter, and actor.

== Early life and career ==
Lang was born to a Jewish family in New York City. Originally a lawyer, practicing in New York City, Lang came to Hollywood in 1938. The following spring, he set up an office as a talent agent, together with his future wife, Flora Pam. In 1940 Lang joined the Jaffe agency and within a few years became the company's president, and came to be known as one of Hollywood's leading agents.

In 1950 he joined the MCA talent agency and two years later became vice president of MCA TV Limited; in this capacity, he worked with MCA's subsidiary Revue Productions involved in developing, creating, and selling new series in the 1950s and '60s, such as Wagon Train, The Bob Cummings Show, and McHale's Navy. He produced and executive-produced movies from 1969 to 1986; in the mid-1970s, Lang produced a series of major epics, including Airport 1975 and Earthquake; both pictures becoming major blockbusters in the disaster film genre.

== Personal life ==
In 1940, Lang married fellow publicist Flora Pam Friedheim, with whom he fathered two sons, including jazz pianist/studio musician Mike Lang. In December 1951, Lang was shot in the left inner thigh by film producer Walter Wanger, who believed Lang was having an affair with his wife, actress Joan Bennett. Lang survived, and Wanger, pleading insanity, served four months in prison. Although Mrs. Lang publicly supported her husband, one reporter who had covered the original scandal, Will Fowler, recalled:

But the one person who was only fleetingly mentioned in the torrid front page affair, the one who publicly stated that she refused to believe her husband had been unfaithful, Mrs. Pam Lang, was driven into deep depression and a few months after the story quieted down, she died of a heart attack.

In 1956 Lang married actress-singer Monica Lewis and fathered one more son. The couple remained married until Lang's death in 1996.

== Last years and death ==
A stroke in 1983 forced Lang's retirement. He died of pneumonia in 1996 in Palm Desert, California. Lang was survived by his wife Monica Lewis and three sons, two by his previous marriage.

== Filmography ==
=== Producer ===
- Tell Them Willie Boy Is Here (1969)
- Act of the Heart (1970)
- The Beguiled (1971)
- They Might Be Giants (1971)
- Play Misty for Me (1971)
- Slaughterhouse-Five (1972)
- The Great Northfield Minnesota Raid (1972)
- Pete 'n' Tillie (1972)
- High Plains Drifter (1973)
- Charley Varrick (1973)
- Breezy (1973)
- Airport 1975 (1974)
- Earthquake (1974)
- The Front Page (1974)
- Swashbuckler (1976)
- Airport '77 (1977)
- Rollercoaster (1977)
- House Calls (1978)
- Nunzio (1978)
- The Concorde ... Airport '79 (1979)
- House Calls (1979, TV series)
- The Nude Bomb (1980)
- Little Miss Marker (1980)
- Masada (1981, TV miniseries)
- The Sting II (1983)
- Stick (1985)

=== Presenter ===
- Play Misty for Me (1971)
- The Eiger Sanction (1975)

=== Screenwriter ===
- The Concorde ... Airport '79 (1979)

=== Actor ===
- Real Life (1979)
