= Miller Music Publishing Co. =

- Parent company: Metro-Goldwyn-Mayer (1934–1973); United Artists (1973–1981); MGM/UA Entertainment Co. (1981–1983); CBS Records (1983); Columbia Pictures (1983)
- Founded: 1906
- Founder: Webb Rockefeller Miller
- Successor: Robbins, Feist, Miller
- Country of origin: United States
- Headquarters location: Chicago, Illinois
- Publication types: Sheet music

Miller Music Publishing Co. was a Chicago-based music publishing company founded in 1906 by Webb Rockefeller Miller. In 1934, Metro-Goldwyn-Mayer acquired a controlling interest in its capital stock of Miller Music, Leo Feist, Inc., and Robbins Music Corporation, and merged the three companies. In 1935, the new company was named Robbins, Feist, Miller Music Publishing Companies, but was commonly known as The Big Three.

In 1973, MGM sold Robbins, Feist, and Miller to United Artists. In 1981, MGM acquired UA and formed MGM/UA Communications Co. In 1983, MGM/UA sold its music publishing business to CBS Records. CBS then sold the print music arm, Big 3 Music, to Columbia Pictures.
