= Monica Lewis =

American actress and singer (1922–2015)

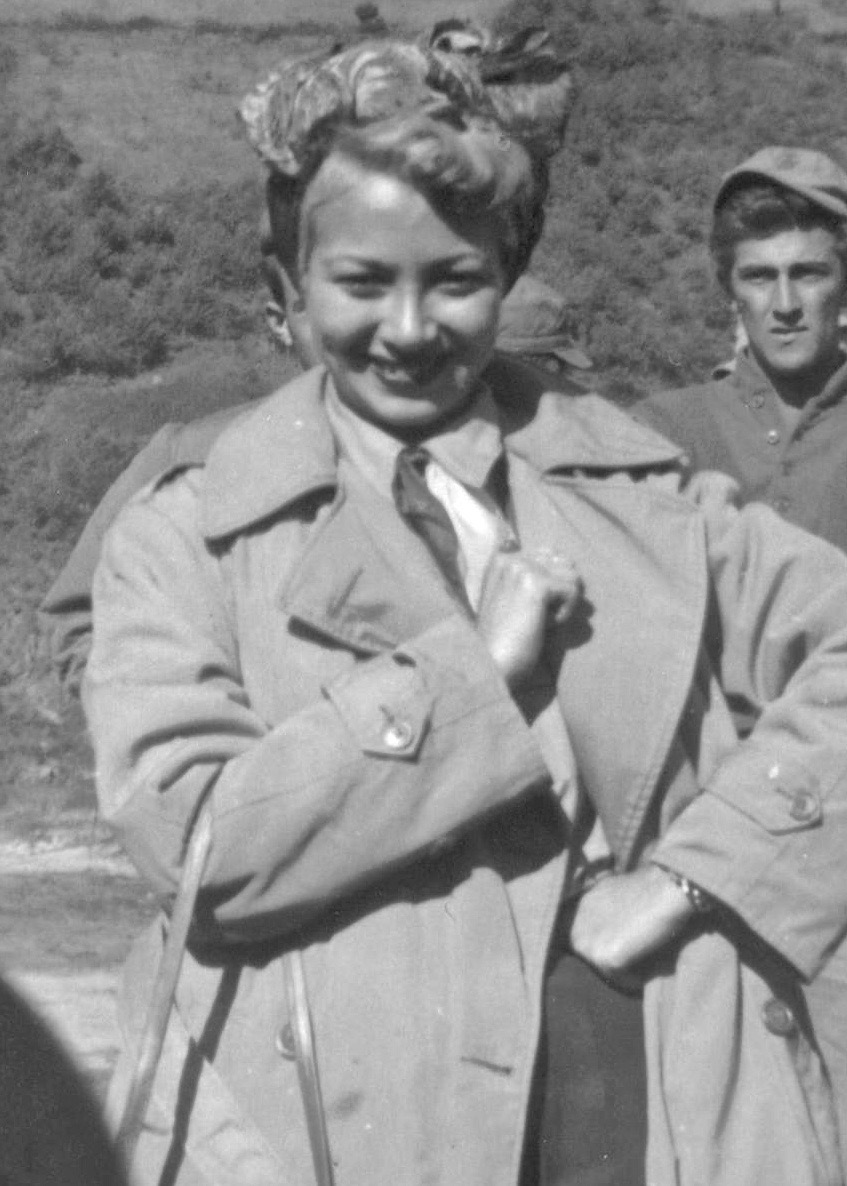
- Lewis in Korea, 1951
- Born: May Lewis; May 5, 1922; Chicago, Illinois, U.S.
- Died: June 12, 2015 (aged 93); Los Angeles, California, U.S.
- Occupations: Singer; actress
- Years active: 1941–1988
- Spouses: Bob Thiele (m. 1945; div. 1947); Jennings Lang (m. 1956; died 1996)
- Children: 1
- Website: www.monicalewis.com

Monica Lewis (born May Lewis; May 5, 1922 – June 12, 2015) was an American jazz singer and film actress. Between 1947 and 1961, she was the voice for Chiquita Banana's animated ad campaign.

== Biography ==
=== Early life ===
Lewis was born in Chicago on May 5, 1922, the youngest of three children. Her father, Leon, was a pianist, musical director for CBS, and composer while her mother, Jessica, was a singer with the Chicago Opera Company, with Lewis studying voice with her mother. When Lewis was 11, she and her family moved to New York City due to The Great Depression.

=== Career ===
Lewis began singing on radio after a successful audition with WMCA in New York City led to her own program. While studying at Hunter College at age 17 she started working as a singer for a radio show titled Gloom Dodgers in order to support her family. Shortly after working for Gloom Dodgers, Lewis had a radio show titled Monica Makes Music. She went on to co-star on The Chesterfield Supper Club on radio.

She won a part as a singing cigarette girl in the Broadway show Johnny 2X4. Lewis' work on Broadway led to performing at the Stork Club and leaving school; she changed her name from May to Monica because she thought it was "sexier", telling The New York Times that "I feel much more like Monica and I look much more like Monica, too".

In 1943, jazz pianist Leonard Feather told Lewis that bandleader Benny Goodman needed a singer because Peggy Lee had left upon marrying his band's guitarist Dave Barbour. At an audition in Times Square with hundreds of women participating, Lewis earned the part as a singer and began to sing on Hotel Astor's roof with Goodman's orchestra. With the help of Goodman she began to establish her career through nationally broadcast shows such as The Revere Camera Show and Beat the Band. Lewis was dubbed "America’s Singing Sweetheart" during this time. She recorded for Signature Records, MGM Records, Decca Records, Capitol Records, and Verve Records. Some of her songs included "Put the Blame on Mame", "I Wish You Love", and "Autumn Leaves." However, Lewis' parents did not allow her to perform in out-of-town tours.

For a short time, Lewis participated in advertisements for companies such as Burlington Mills and Camel cigarettes. Between 1947 and 1961, Lewis was the singing voice for "Miss Chiquita Banana", a cartoon television spokesmascot for Chiquita bananas. According to an interview Lewis gave in 2013, the job provided her with financial security for many years.

In 1948, she appeared in the first Ed Sullivan Show, then titled Toast of the Town, which also featured Richard Rodgers and Oscar Hammerstein II, and Dean Martin and Jerry Lewis. It was created and produced by her brother Marlo Lewis.

In 1950, she was signed to a contract with MGM. Some of her films included The Strip, Everything I Have Is Yours, Affair with a Stranger, and The D.I, and she later appeared in some 1970s disaster films such as Earthquake (1974), Rollercoaster (1977), and both Airport '77 (1977) and The Concorde ... Airport '79 (1979).

From the 1950s to the 1980s, she made appearances in several television action series, including Those Whiting Girls, Peter Gunn, Johnny Staccato, Wagon Train, The Virginian, Tales of Wells Fargo, and Ironside.

She resumed her singing career in the 1980s and 1990s, performing at popular clubs such as the Vine St. Bar and Grill and The Hollywood Roosevelt Cinegrill in Los Angeles and Danny's Skylight Room in New York City.

She spoke about her career 10 days before her death to The New Yorker in an article published in the September 7, 2015 edition

=== Personal life ===
Lewis was married twice. Her first husband was the American record producer Bob Thiele, with whom she started Signature Records. They married in 1945 but divorced a couple of years later. She moved to Beverly Hills, California in the 1950s. In 1956, she married film producer Jennings Lang, and they remained together until his death in 1996. They had three children, including screenwriter/producer-director Rocky Lang and, by her husband's first marriage, jazz pianist/Hollywood session musician Mike Lang. Her sister Barbara was a pianist and her brother Marlo was co-producer of The Ed Sullivan Show.

In her 2011 memoir Hollywood Through My Eyes, Lewis revealed that actor (and future U.S. President) Ronald Reagan had proposed to her.

Lewis died of natural causes at the age of 93 on June 12, 2015 at her home in Woodland Hills, California.

== Filmography ==
Year	Title	Role	Notes
1951	Inside Straight	Cafe singer	
1951	Excuse My Dust	Daisy Lou Shultzer	
1951	The Strip	Herself	
1952	Everything I Have Is Yours	Sybil Meriden	
1953	Affair with a Stranger	Janet Boothe	
1957	The D.I.	Burt	
1973	Charley Varrick	Beverly	
1974	Earthquake	Barbara	
1977	Airport '77	Anne	
1977	Rollercoaster	Tourist mother	
1978	Zero to Sixty	Aunt Clara	
1978	The Immigrants	Mrs Whittier	TV movie
1979	The Concorde ... Airport '79	Gretchen	
1982	Boxoffice	Francesca	
1983	The Sting II	Band singer	
1985	Stick	Female vocalist	
1988	Dead Heat	Mrs. Von Heisenberg	

== Bibliography ==
- Lewis, Monica; Lamanna, Dean (2011). Hollywood Through My Eyes: The Lives & Loves of a Golden Age Siren. Cable Publishing. ISBN 978-1934980880.
