= Gerald Nachman =

American journalist (1938–2018)

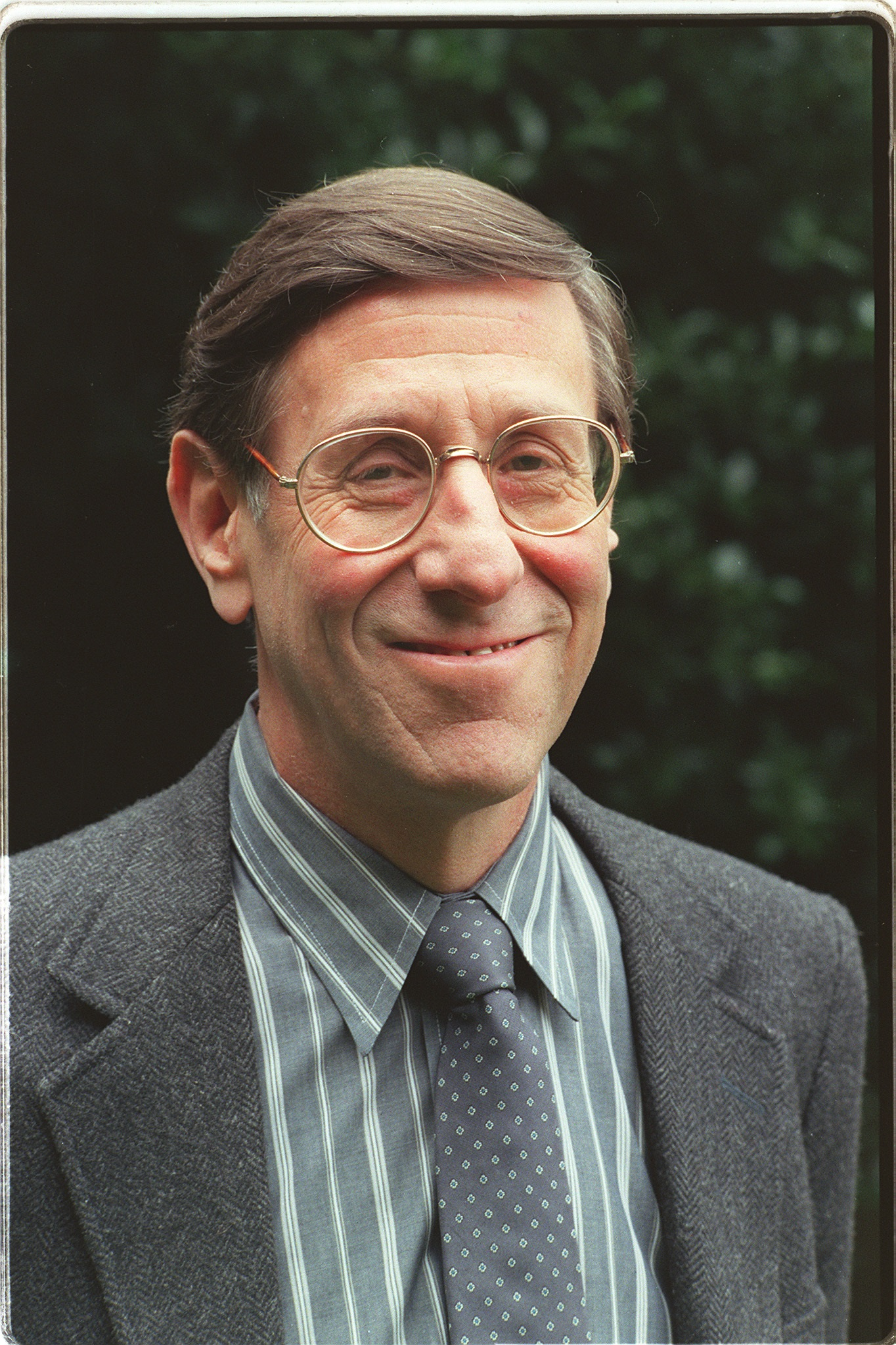
- Nachman in 1995
- Born: Gerald Weil Nachman; January 13, 1938; Oakland, California, U.S.
- Died: April 14, 2018 (aged 80); San Francisco, California, U.S.
- Education: San Jose State University
- Occupations: Journalist, author
- Spouse: Mary Campbell McGeachy (m. 1966; div. 1979)

Gerald Weil Nachman (January 13, 1938 – April 14, 2018) was an American journalist and author from San Francisco.

== Biography ==
Nachman was born January 13, 1938, to Leonard Calvert Nachman, a salesman and actor in the Little Theater movement, and Isabel (Weil) Nachman. He received an associate of arts degree from Merritt College, in 1958, and then a bachelor of arts degree from San Jose State University in 1960, beginning as a TV reviewer and humor columnist at what was then called the San Jose Mercury while he was still a student.

He was a feature writer for the New York Post from 1964–66 and a feature writer and TV critic for New York Daily News from 1972–79, with a stop in the middle as columnist and film critic for the Oakland Tribune. For a time he was best known for his syndicated humor columns, “Double Take” and “The Single Life.” In 1979, he joined The Chronicle as a columnist and theater critic, reviewing not just theater but also film, cabaret and comedy. He left the newspaper in 1993 but continued to be active, appearing on KALW's radio show "Minds Over Matter."

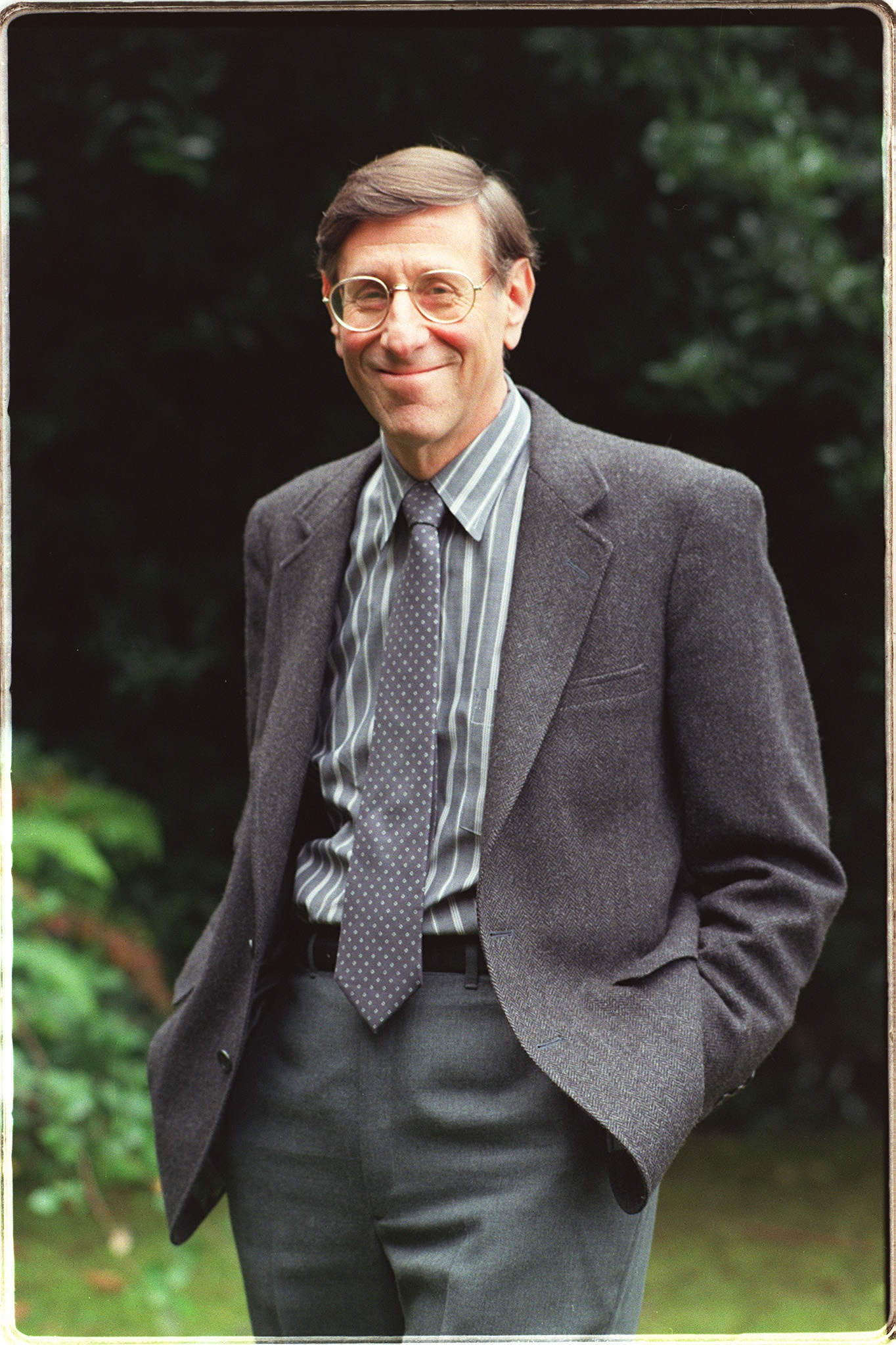
Nachman in San Francisco, 1995

== Career ==
- 1963 TV writer for the San Jose Mercury News.
- 1963–1966 feature writer for the New York Post
- 1966–1971 theater and film writer for the Oakland Tribune
- 1972–1979 columnist, syndicated by the New York Daily News
- 1979–1993 entertainment and theater writer for the San Francisco Chronicle.
- 1993–2015 panelist, Minds Over Matter, KALW; accessed April 18, 2018.

== Death ==
Nachman died April 14, 2018, at Coventry Place, a senior residence in San Francisco, California, at the age of 80.

== Awards ==
- ASCAP Deems Taylor Award
- Newspaper Guild of New York Page One Award

== Books ==
- Playing House. Doubleday. 1978. ISBN 978-0385123419.
- Out on a whim: Some very close brushes with life. Doubleday. 1983. ISBN 978-0385123402.
- The Fragile Bachelor. Ten Speed Press. 1989. ISBN 978-0898152890.
- Raised on Radio. University of California Press. 2000. ISBN 978-0520223035.
- Seriously Funny: The Rebel Comedians of the 1950s and 1960s. New York: Pantheon Books. 2003. ISBN 978-0375410307.
- Right Here on Our Stage Tonight!: Ed Sullivan's America. University of California Press. 2009. ISBN 978-0520268012.

== Musical Comedy Revues ==
- Quirks (1979)
- Aftershocks (1993)
- New Wrinkles (2002)
