= Flesh (theology) =

Term in Jewish and Christian theology

In the Bible, the word "flesh" is often used simply as a description of the fleshy parts of an animal, including that of human beings, and typically in reference to dietary laws and sacrifice. Less often it is used as a metaphor for familial or kinship relations, and (particularly in the Christian tradition) as a metaphor to describe sinful tendencies. A related turn of phrase identifies certain sins as "carnal" sins, from Latin caro, carnis, meaning "flesh."

== Etymology ==
The word flesh (from the Old English flǣsc, of Germanic origin) is translated from the Hebrew lexemes בשר bāśār and שאר šə’êr, and from the Greek σάρξ (sarx) and κρέας (kreas).

== Meaning and Use ==
=== Old Testament ===
In the Hebrew Bible, the way of all flesh is a religious phrase that in its original sense meant death, the fate of all living things. This phrase does not appear verbatim in the King James Bible either, but is clearly prefigured in that translation:

And God said unto Noah, The end of all flesh is come before me; for the earth is filled with violence through them; and, behold, I will destroy them with the earth. (Genesis 6:13)

Samuel Butler, by contrast, used The Way of All Flesh as the title of a semi-autobiographical family saga, using the phrase to refer ambiguously to either the religious or to a sexual sense.

=== New Testament ===
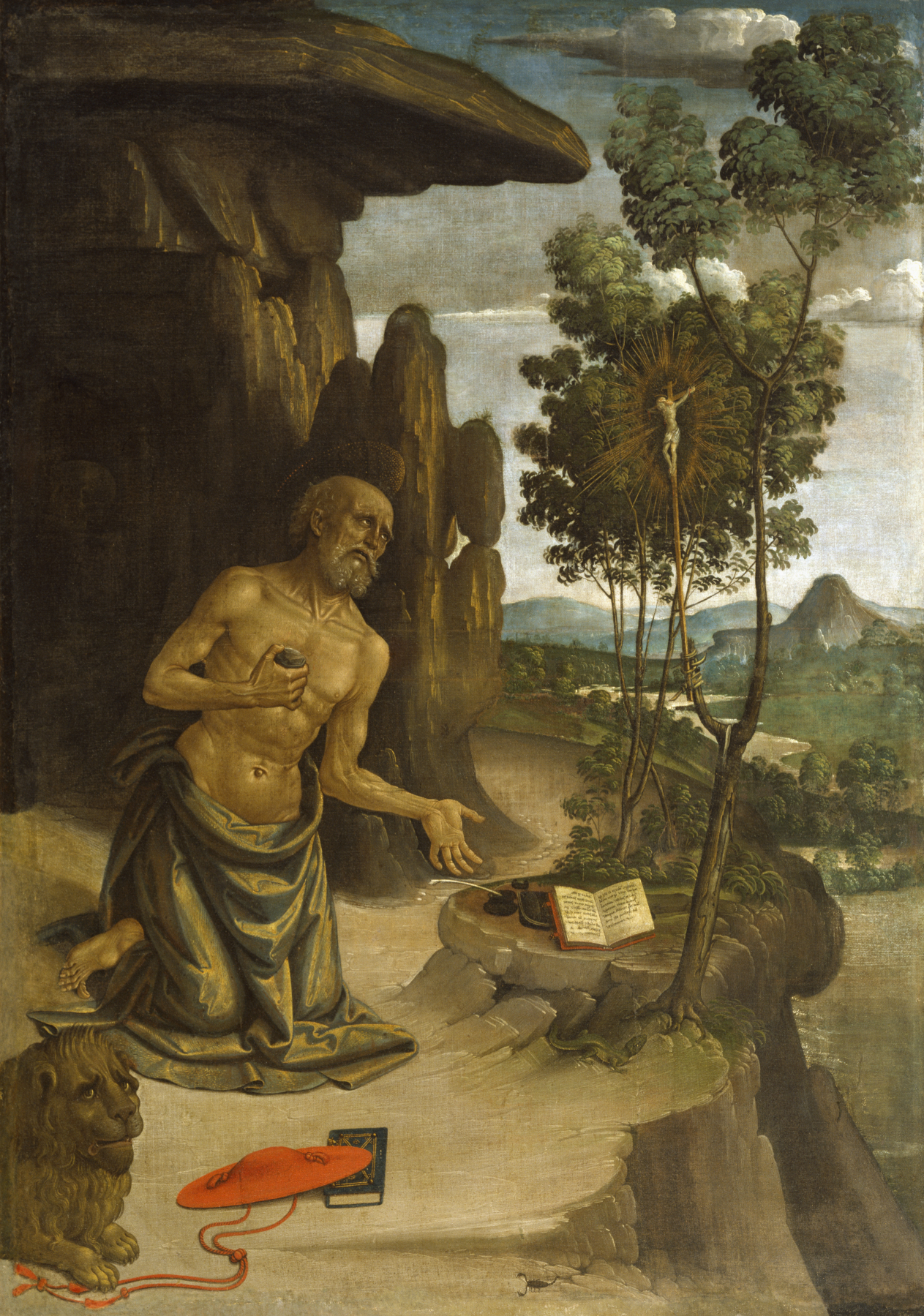
Saint Jerome in the Wilderness The saint spent four years in the Syrian desert as a hermit, mortifying his flesh and elevating his spirit through study.

Saint Paul makes this connection in Romans 7:18, in which he says:

For I know that in me (that is, in my flesh,) dwelleth no good thing: for to will is present with me; but how to perform that which is good I find not.(KJV)

However, the (fourth century) Apostles' Creed affirms carnis resurrectionem (the resurrection of the flesh), the body being an essential part of a person.

In religious language, the "flesh" took on specific connotations of sexual sins. It was in this sense that the nineteenth century critic Robert Buchanan condemned a Fleshly School of Poetry, accusing Swinburne, Rossetti, and Morris with preoccupation with sex and sensual matters.

A traditional turn of phrase condemns "the world, the flesh, and the Devil" as the sources of temptation to sin. This specific phrase does not appear in the King James Bible, but a similar sense appears in passages such as 1 John 2:16:

For all that is in the world, the lust of the flesh, and the lust of the eyes, and the pride of life, is not of the Father, but is of the world. (KJV)

The phrase definitely appears in the writings of Abelard, who writes that "there are three things that tempt us: the world, the flesh, and the devil." The litany of the 1662 edition of the Book of Common Prayer contains the petition:

From fornication, and all other deadly sin; and from all the deceits of the world, the flesh, and the devil,
Spare us, good Lord.

and the English translations of Roman Catholic litanies often contain a similar petition.

This traditional turn of phrase gave rise to a number of films and books entitled The world, the flesh, and the devil.

== Analysis and interpretation ==
=== Catholic Church ===
In the Catholic Church, the flesh has a twofold relation with the bodyless spirit. On one hand, the Holy Spirit God has made the Incarnation of the Son of God into the holy womb of the Most Blessed Virgin Mary, so as to say that that Holy Spirit God has naturally generated the flesh of Christ in His earthly mortal body. But most of Christians also believe in the pre-existence of Christ from the eternity in a human-divine body which was generated by God the Father before all centuries and, more particularly, before the creation of Genesis 1. His body pre-existed from ever and for ever, always keeping a dyophysite nature which is both human and divine.

On the other hand, the human-divine flesh of God the Father and of God the Son created all the visible and the invisible creatures, as it is stated by the Nicene Creed. The Father and the Son had created the angels and the soul of Adam and Eve. According to John 1:3, all what was made, it was created through the mediation of the Word of God which is identified with Jesus Christ the Lord. Hence, his flesh had the power to create the bodyless angels.

Christians also believe that at time of its conception the unborn child receives a unique soul which is created by God for him and can't be destroyed nor annihilated, even by God himself: once created, it is destinated to live forever. Each flesh has a unique soul and, vice versa, each soul has a unique flesh and it isn't ubicated in one or more articular parts, but, on the contrary, it is all in any single part of the flesh it has taken at the time of the birth. The soul can't transmigrate in a different body, both human or animal.

At the time of death, the soul leaves the body and has its own personal and particular judgment. At the end of times, it is followed by the Resurrection of the flesh for a last judgment which is universal and that can have a twofold conclusion: to be a judgment and resurrection of eternal salvation in the Paradise or in the Purgatory, or to be of eternal condemnation into the Hell. The Resurrection of the flesh is mainly finalized to make perfect the Mystical Body of Christ and the related Communion of saints.

The original sin is heired by children from both their parents through the flesh. It is forgiven uniquely by way of the sacramental grace of the Catholic Baptism. The Blessed Virgin Mary is the unique human creature which is believed to be conceived without the original sin and also the unique which has come to Paradise with same the human flesh she had since her birth. Those statements are the truths of faith affirmed in the two dogmas of the Immaculate Conception and of the Assumption of the Blessed Virgin Mary to Heaven in body and soul. She is also believed to have a unique Son and to have kept preserved her virginity toward all her earthly life.

More particularly, the dogma of the Perpetual virginity of Mary states that Jesus Christ God was born without any union of human fleshes. In a complementary way, the Nicene Creed affirms that he was incarnated in the womb of the Blessed Virgin Mary by the work of the Holy Spirit God. Jesus is believed to be the unique human flesh conceived and born in a virginal way, since he and he uniquely is believed to be God himself.

== See also ==
- Anicca
- Christianity and sexuality
- Judaism and sexuality
- Materialism
- Mortification (theology)
- Religious male circumcision
- Religious views on female genital mutilation
- Sensualism
- Sex in the Hebrew Bible
- Sic transit gloria mundi
- The world, the flesh, and the devil
- Theology of the Body
- This too shall pass
- Vanitas
