= Burt Reynolds filmography =

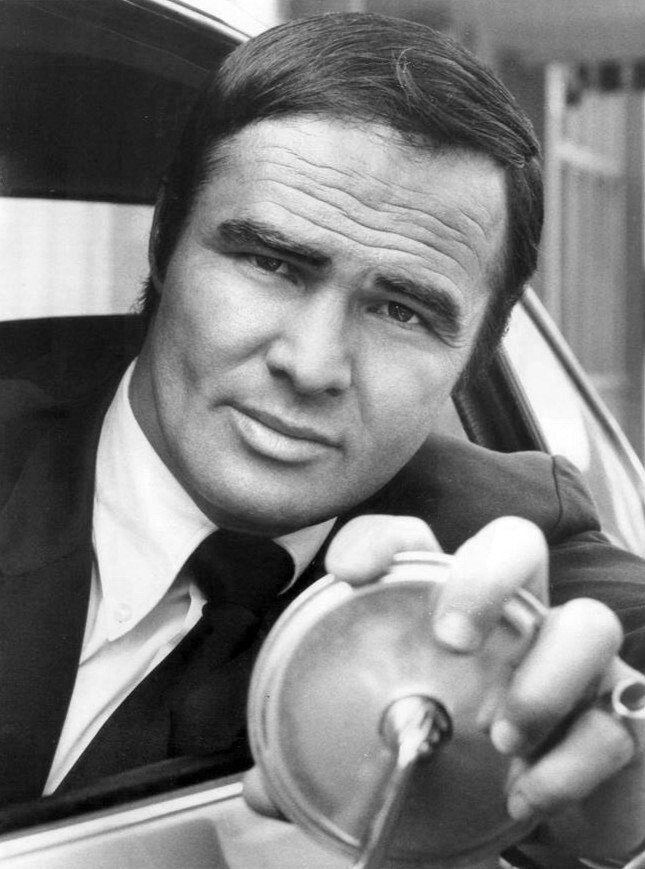
- Reynolds in Dan August (1971)
- Film: 145
- Television film: 13
- Television series: 9
- Theatre: 1

The following is the complete filmography of American actor Burt Reynolds.

== Film ==
Year	Title	Role	Notes
1961	Angel Baby	"Hoke" Adams	
1961	Armored Command	"Skee"	
1965	Operation C.I.A.	CIA Agent Mark Andrews	
1966	Navajo Joe	Joe "Navajo Joe"	
1969	100 Rifles	Joe "Yaqui Joe" Herrera	
1969	Sam Whiskey	Sam Whiskey	
1969	Impasse	Pat Morrison	
1969	Shark!	Caine	
1970	Skullduggery	Douglas Temple	
1972	Fuzz	Detective Steve Carella	
1972	Deliverance	Lewis Medlock	
1972	Everything You Always Wanted to Know About Sex* (*But Were Afraid to Ask)	Sperm Switchboard Chief	
1973	Shamus	Shamus McCoy	
1973	The Man Who Loved Cat Dancing	Jay Grobart	
1973	White Lightning	Bobby "Gator" McKlusky	
1974	The Longest Yard	Paul "Wrecking" Crewe	
1975	At Long Last Love	Michael Oliver Pritchard III	
1975	W.W. and the Dixie Dancekings	W.W. Bright	
1975	Lucky Lady	Walker Ellis	
1975	Hustle	Lieutenant Phil Gaines	Also executive producer
1976	Silent Movie	Himself	Cameo
1976	Gator	Bobby "Gator" McKlusky	Also director
1976	Nickelodeon	Buck Greenway	
1977	Smokey and the Bandit	Bo "Bandit" Darville	
1977	Semi-Tough	Billy Clyde Puckett	
1978	The End	Wendell Sonny Lawson	Also director
1978	Hooper	Sonny Hooper	Also producer
1979	Starting Over	Phil Potter	
1980	Rough Cut	Jack Rhodes	
1980	Smokey and the Bandit II	Bo "Bandit" Darville	
1981	The Cannonball Run	J.J. McClure	
1981	Paternity	Buddy Evans	
1981	Sharky's Machine	Sergeant Tom Sharky	Also director
1982	The Best Little Whorehouse in Texas	Sheriff Ed Earl Dodd	
1982	Best Friends	Richard Babson	
1983	Stroker Ace	Stroker Ace	
1983	Smokey and the Bandit Part 3	The Real Bandit	Cameo
1983	The Man Who Loved Women	David Fowler	
1984	Cannonball Run II	J.J. McClure	
1984	City Heat	Mike Murphy	
1985	Stick	Ernest "Stick" Stickley	Also director
1986	Uphill All the Way	The Gambler	Uncredited cameo
1986	Heat	Nick "Mex" Escalante	
1987	Malone	CIA Agent John Haggerty / Richard Malone	
1988	Rent-a-Cop	Tony Church	
1988	Switching Channels	John L. Sullivan IV	
1989	Physical Evidence	Joe Paris	
1989	Breaking In	Ernie Mullins	
1989	All Dogs Go to Heaven	Charlie B. Barkin	Voice
1990	Modern Love	Colonel Frank Parker	
1992	The Player	Himself	Cameo
1993	Cop and a Half	Detective Nick McKenna	
1995	The Maddening	Roy Scudder	
1996	Citizen Ruth	Blaine Gibbons	
1996	Striptease	Congressman David Dilbeck	
1996	Mad Dog Time	Jacky "Wacky Jacky" Jackson	
1996	Raven	Jerome "Raven" Katz	Direct-to-video
1996	Frankenstein and Me	Les Williams	Direct-to-video
1997	Meet Wally Sparks	Lenny Spencer	
1997	Bean	General Newton	
1997	Boogie Nights	Jack Horner	
1997	Big City Blues	Connor	Direct-to-video; also co-producer
1998	Crazy Six	Dakota	Direct-to-video
1999	The Hunter's Moon	Clayton Samuels	Direct-to-video
1999	Pups	Daniel Bender	
1999	Stringer	Wolko	Direct-to-video
1999	Mystery, Alaska	Judge Walter Burns	
2000	Waterproof	Eli Zeal	
2000	The Crew	Joey "Bats" Pistella	
2000	The Last Producer	Sonny Wexler	Direct-to-video; also director
2001	Driven	Carl Henry	
2001	Tempted	Charlie LeBlanc	
2001	Hotel	Flamenco Manager	
2001	The Hollywood Sign	Kage Mulligan	
2001	Auf Herz und Nieren	Banko	
2002	Time of the Wolf	Archie McGregor	
2002	Snapshots	Larry J. Brodsky	
2003	The Librarians	"Irish"	Uncredited
2004	Without a Paddle	Del Knox	
2005	The Longest Yard	Coach Nate Scarborough	
2005	The Dukes of Hazzard	J.D. "Boss" Hogg	
2005	The Legend of Frosty the Snowman	The Narrator	Voice; Direct-to-DVD
2006	Cloud 9	Billy Cole	Direct-to-DVD
2006	End Game	General Montgomery	Direct-to-DVD
2006	Forget About It	Sam LeFleur	
2006	Grilled	Goldbluth	
2006	Broken Bridges	Jake Delton	
2007	In the Name of the King	King Konreid	
2007	Randy and the Mob	Elmore Culpepper	Uncredited
2008	Deal	Tommy Vinson	
2008	Delgo	Delgo's Father	Voice
2008	A Bunch of Amateurs	Jefferson Steele	
2011	Not Another Not Another Movie	C.J. Waters	
2014	Hamlet & Hutch	Papa Hutch	Direct-to-DVD
2014	A Magic Christmas	Buster	Voice; Direct-to-DVD
2015	Pocket Listing	Ron Glass	
2016	Hollow Creek	"Seagrass" Lambert	
2016	An Innocent Kiss	Grandpa Barnes	
2016	Shangri-La Suite	The Narrator	Voice
2017	Apple of My Eye	Charlie	Direct-to-DVD
2017	The Last Movie Star	Marty Schulman / Vic Edwards	
2017	Miami Love Affair	Robert	
2017	Henri	George Duncan	Direct-to-DVD
2017	Shadow Fighter	Paddy Grier	
2021	Defining Moments	Chester	Posthumous release

== Television ==
Year	Title	Role	Notes
1958	Flight	Captain Sam Allen / Captain Jack Hilyard	2 episodes
1959	M Squad	Peter Marashi	Episode: "The Teacher"
1959	The Lawless Years	Tony Sappio	Episode: "The Payoff"
1959	Pony Express	Adam	Episode: "The Good Samaritan"
1959–1960	Riverboat	Ben Frazer	20 episodes
1959–1960	Playhouse 90	"Ace" / The Actor	2 episodes
1960	Johnny Ringo	Tad Stuart	Episode: "The Stranger"
1960	Alfred Hitchcock Presents	Bill Davis	Season 5 Episode 37: "Escape to Sonoita"
1960	Lock-Up	Latchard Duncan	Episode: "The Case of Alexis George"
1960–1961	The Blue Angels	Chuck / Corman	2 episodes
1960–1961	The Aquanauts	Leo / Jimmy	2 episodes
1961	Ripcord	The Assassin	Episode: "Crime Jump"
1961	Michael Shayne	Jerry Turner	Episode: "The Boat Caper"
1961	Dick Powell's Zane Grey Theatre	Branch Taylor	Episode: "Man from Everywhere"
1961	The Brothers Brannagan	Abelard	Episode: "Bordertown"
1961	Naked City	Young Man	Episode: "Requiem for a Sunday Afternoon"
1961–1962	The Everglades	Trask / Lew Johnson	2 episodes
1962	Route 66	Tommy	Episode: "Love Is a Skinny Kid"
1962	Perry Mason	Chuck Blair	Episode: "The Case of the Counterfeit Crank"
1962–1965	Gunsmoke	Quint Asper	50 episodes
1963	The Twilight Zone	Rocky Rhodes	Episode: "The Bard"
1965	Branded	"Red Hand"	Episode: "Now Join the Human Race"
1965	Flipper	Al Bardeman	2 episodes
1965	12 O'Clock High	Technical Sergeant Vern Chapman	2 episodes
1965–1968	The F.B.I.	John Duquesne / Michael Murtaugh	2 episodes
1966	Hawk	Lieutenant John Hawk	17 episodes
1967	Gentle Ben	Pilot	Episode: "Voice from the Wilderness"
1968	Premiere	Pete Lassiter	Episode: "Lassiter"
1968	Fade In	Rob	Television film
1970	Love, American Style	Stanley Dunbar	Episode: "Love and the Banned Book"
1970	Hunters Are for Killing	L.G. Floran	Television film
1970	Run, Simon, Run	Simon	Television film
1970–1971	Dan August	Dan August	26 episodes
1980	Saturday Night Live	Host	1 episode
1986	The Golden Girls	Himself	Episode: "Ladies of the Evening"
1987–1991	Out of This World	Troy Garland	Voice; 95 episodes
1989–1990	B.L. Stryker	B.L. Stryker	12 episodes; also co-executive producer and director
1990–1994	Evening Shade	Wood Newton	98 episodes; also co-executive producer and director
1993	Beverly Hills, 90210	Himself	Episode: "She Came in Through the Bathroom Window"
1993	The Larry Sanders Show	Himself	Episode: "The Grand Opening"
1993	The Man from Left Field	Jack Robinson	Television film; also director and producer
1995	Hope and Gloria	Himself	Episode: "Sisyphus, Prometheus and Me"
1995	Cybill	Himself	Episode: "The Cheese Stands Alone"
1996	The Cherokee Kid	Bob "Otter Bob", The Mountain Man	Television film
1997	King of the Hill	M.F. Thatherton	Voice; Episode: "The Company Man"
1997	Duckman	Judge Keaton	Voice; Episode: "Das Sub"
1998	Universal Soldier II: Brothers in Arms	CIA Deputy Director Mentor	Television film
1998	Universal Soldier III: Unfinished Business	CIA Deputy Director Mentor	Television film
1998	Hard Time	Detective Logan McQueen	Television film; also director
1998	Hard Time: The Premonition	Detective Logan McQueen	Television film
1999	Hard Time: Hostage Hotel	Detective Logan McQueen	Television film
2001	Emeril	Himself	Episode: "The Sidekick"
2002	The X-Files	Mr. Burt	Episode: "Improbable"
2002	Johnson County War	Hunt Lawton	Television film
2002	Miss Lettie and Me	Samuel Madison	Television film
2003	Hard Ground	John "Chill" McKay	Television film
2003–2004	Ed	Russ Burton	2 episodes
2005	The King of Queens	Coach Walcott	Episode: "Hi, School"
2005	Robot Chicken	J.J. McClure / Himself	Voice; Episode: "Gold Dust Gasoline"
2005	Duck Dodgers	Royal Serpenti	Voice; Episode: "Master & Disaster"
2006	Freddie	Carl Crane Pool	Episode: "Mother of All Grandfathers"
2006–2009	My Name Is Earl	"Chubby"	3 episodes
2010	Burn Notice	Paul Anderson	Episode: "Past & Future Tense"
2011	American Dad!	Senator Buckingham	Voice for the episode: "School Lies"
2011	Reel Love	Wade Whitman	Television film
2012	Archer	Himself	Voice; Episode: "The Man from Jupiter"
2014	Category 5	Pops	Television film
2016	Hitting the Breaks	Ron Wilcox	10 episodes
2017	In Sanity, Florida	Burt Reynolds - Retired Movie Star	Episode: "The Town is Small, the Crazy Isn't"

== Video games ==
Year	Title	Voice role
2002	Grand Theft Auto: Vice City	Avery Carrington
2011	Saints Row: The Third	Himself / The Mayor

== Theatre ==
Year	Title	Role	Notes
1961	Look, We've Come Through	Skip	Broadway
