= Mónica Pasqualotto =

Venezuelan TV host, actress, and model

Mónica Pasqualotto, or La Pasqualotto, is a TV host, radio host, actress, and model. She was born in Caracas, Venezuela on October 15, 1974. She has been the image of several products on television and for the Venezuelan press. She is part of the Board of Olimpiadas Especiales Venezuela and she has worked since 2005 as a spokeswoman for the Dividendo Voluntario para la Comunidad organization affiliated with United Way.

== Biography ==
Monica is the older of two siblings. Her mother, Gloria Pesquera, was the 3rd finalist in the contest Miss Venezuela in 1964 and also competed in the Miss International. Monica's father, Gianfranco Pasqualotto, was Italian. Her brother, Giancarlo Pasqualotto, is also an actor and singer.

Monica she wanted to study medicine when she was young but decided to study journalism in the Universidad Católica Andrés Bello in Caracas. While at the university, she also studied acting. In 1991 she started to work with the Payasitas Nifu Nifa and in 1991 she recorded in Chelique Sarabia´s studio the first album of her own child group "The Trapolinas". This first album had 12 tracks written by Monica.

In the last year of the university she appeared in a Televen program named Ticket, as co-host with Daniel Carles. After that, her career started in television, radio, film and theater. In May 2009 she traveled with Ralph Kinnard to the Cannes Festival in France to participate in the film festival with the movie A mi me gusta, which she stars.

Also in 2009 she founded Coco Films with her husband, German filmmaker Ralph Kinnard.

== Filmography ==
=== TV ===
- 2016 : "TN3": TV host of "Americateve"
- 2016 : "AQP": TV host of "Americateve"
- 2007 : "El que sabe, sabe": TV host of "Venevisión"
- 2004-2005: "Red Carpet": TV host "RCTV"
- 2004-2005: "Coge el Hilo": TV host, "RCTV"
- 2004 : "La Dama de la Televisión": TV host,"RCTV"
- 2004 : "Lolas y Lolos": TV host,"RCTV"
- 2004 : Antesala Premier "Chupacabras" and "La Cuaima": TV host, "RCTV"
- 2003 : "Date Express": TV host, "Sony Entertainment Television"
- 2001 : "Son las Tres": TV host, "RCTV"
- 1999-2004: "Loco Video Loco": TV host, "RCTV"
- 1999 : "Que bien te ves": TV host, "RCTV"
- 2001 : "Trucos de la Mágia": TV host, "RCTV"
- 2001 : "Tropa de Vacaciones": TV host, "RCTV"
- 1998-1999: "Magazine Marte TV": TV host.
- 1998 : "Ticket": TV host, Televen.
- 1993-1994: "Noticiero UCAB 7D": Ancla. "Universidad Católica Andrés Bello"

=== Soap operas ===
- 2013 : "Maid en Manhattan": "Telemundo"
- 1994 : A tiempo - TV Series 1 capitulo Televen
- 1996 : La llaman Mariamor - RCTV
- 2000 : Mariú - Lidia - RCTV
- 2001 : A Calzon Quitao - RCTV
- 2004 : Negra Consentida - Moraima Ferrer - RCTV
- 2006 : Mujer de Mundo - Matilde - Venevisión
- 2007-2008: : Arroz con Leche - Cecilia de Lara - Venevisión
- 2009 : Los Misterios del Amor - Maricruz Fernandez - Venevisión
- 2011 : Vuelve a mi - Liliana Telemundo
- 2011 : Una Maid en Manhattan - Mireya - Telemundo

=== Films ===
- 2016: "Miami Love Affair": "Ralph Kinnard" "Coco Productions"
- 2014: "Arrancame la vida": "Alain Maiki"
- 2005: A mi me gusta - Margarita García. First Venezuelan romantic comedy Primera of the German director Ralph Kinnard. The film was entered in the official selection of the Calcutta's Festival. In Venezuela it won the "Mara de Oro" for best movie and best actress.

=== Theater ===
- 1991 : "Bartolomeo en la Isla Mágica". Musical. Arcos y Voces Juveniles de Caracas. U.E. Colegio Emil Friedman.
- 1990 : "Juguemos a Cambiar el Mundo" de Matilde Corral. Sala José Félix Rivas.Teatro Teresa Carreño.
- 1991 : Mozart. Musical. Arcos y Voces Juveniles de Caracas. U.E. Colegio Emil Friedman.
- 1992 : La Paradura del Niño Arcos y Voces Juveniles de Caracas. U.E. Colegio Emil Friedman.
- 2005 : La Cenicienta.adaptation. Natalia Martínez. Personaje: Cenicienta. Ateneo de Caracas
- 2005-2006: "Yo, Tu, Ella" . Mónica Montañez. 1st season: Teatro Escena 8. 2nd. Season CELARG.
- 2006-2007: "Una Novia para el Capitan" . 1st season: Ateneo de Caracas. 2nd. season CELARG Characters: Ariel, Esmeralda y Barbie.
- 2006-2007: Amanecí como con ganas de Morirme Indira Páez. Water People Company. 1st season: Ateneo de Caracas. 2nd season: Trasnocho Theater. 3rd season: Torre CORP BANCA Theater.
- 2007 : "De velo y Corona" Indira Páez y Caterina Cardozo. Torre CORPBANCA Theater.
- 2008 : "El cielo es muy Aburrido" by Oscar Perdomo Marin. Water People Company. CELARG. Caracas.

=== Radio ===
- 2015-2016: "La Hora del Gato": "SBS"
- 1999-2001: "Humor con Humor se Paga" - KYS 101.5 FM
- 2001 : "Fines de semana Hot" - HOT 94.1 FM
- 2001-2002: "En el Medio" - HOT 94.1 FM
- 2002-2003: "El Radio Show". Planeta 105.3 FM
- 2003-2004: "El Mañanero". 91.9 FM Center
- 2004-2006: "Con Buen Pie". 91.9 FM Center
- 2002-2003: "Maduros y Testarudos". Planeta 105.3 FM

== Awards ==
- 2008: Gran Águila de Venezuela, Best Telenovela for "Arroz con Leche".
- 2008: Mara de Oro de Venezuela, Best actress for "Arroz con Leche"
- 2009: Mara de Oro de Venezuela, Best actress for "A mí me gusta".
