= Contemptus mundi =

Theme of contempt for worldly concerns

Contemptus mundi, the "contempt of the world" and worldly concerns, is a theme in the intellectual life of both Classical Antiquity and of Christianity, both in its mystical vein and its ambivalence towards secular life, that figures largely in the Western world's history of ideas. In inculcating a turn of mind that would lead to a state of serenity untrammeled by distracting material appetites and feverish emotional connections, which the Greek philosophers called ataraxia, it drew upon the assumptions of Stoicism and a neoplatonism that was distrustful of deceptive and spurious appearances. In the familiar rhetorical polarity in Hellenic philosophy between the active and the contemplative life, which Christians, who expressly rejected "the World, the Flesh, and the Devil", might exemplify as the way of Martha and the way of Mary, contemptus mundi assumed that only the contemplative life was of lasting value and the world an empty shell, a vanity.

== In classical antiquity ==
In the classical canon, Cicero's Tusculanae Disputationes, essays on achieving Stoic stability of emotions, with rhetorical subjects such as "Contempt of death", was taken up definitively by Boethius in his Consolations of Philosophy, during the troubled closing phase of Late Antiquity. The Latin tradition of dispraise of the public world adapted by Christian moralists, focused especially on the fickleness of Fortune, and the evils exposed in the Latin satire became a mainstay of Christian penitential literature.

== In the Patristic tradition ==
Among early Christians, Eucherius of Lyon, an aristocratic and high-ranking ecclesiastic in the fifth-century Christian Church of Gaul, wrote to his kinsman a widely read letter de contemptu mundi, an expression of the despair for the present and future of the world in its last throes. Contempt for the world provided intellectual underpinnings for the retreat into monasticism: when Saint Florentina, of the prominent Christian family of Hispania, founded her convent, her rule written by her brother Leander of Seville explicitly cited contempt for the world: Regula sive Libellus de institutione virginum et de contemptu mundi ad Florentinam sororem.

== Medieval contemptus mundi ==
The medieval trope of contemptus mundi, drawing upon these converging traditions, pagan philosophy and Christian ascetic theology, was fundamental to a medieval education. A classic Christian expression is Bernard of Cluny's bitter 12th-century satire De contemptu mundi, founded in a deep sense of the transitory nature of secular joys and the abiding permanency of the spiritual life. His text made one of the Auctores octo morales, the "eight moral authors" that formed the central texts of medieval pedagogy.

In the early 12th century, when Adelard of Bath (c. 1080 - 1152) allegorized two contrasting figures to dispute De eodem et diverso; they were Philosophia and Philocosmia, "love of wisdom" and the "love of the world". Adelard's contemporary, Henry of Huntington, in the dedicatory letter to his Historia Anglorum referred in passing to "those who taught the contempt of the world in schools".

An aspect of contempt for this world reflects upon the ephemerality of all life, expressed in the literary rhetorical question of ubi sunt. Even as worldly a pope as Innocent III could write an essay "On the Misery of the Human Condition", De miseria humanae conditionis, which Geoffrey Chaucer is reputed to have rendered in English, in a translation now lost. The theme had political ramifications within the Roman Church, as it was inextricably bound up with questions of apostolic poverty which was roundly condemned, in the instance of the Humiliati, as heretical.

The waning of the dominant attitude of contemptus mundi that had informed elite culture, a development that gathered impetus during the second half of the 14th century, was a precursor to the emergence of the modern secular ethos, encouraging men to study material things with greater lucidity than before, as Georges Duby has observed, noting the turn taken in painting and sculpture toward the realistic delineation of aspects of material life.

== Early modern culture ==
The theme of contemptus mundi continued to inform European poetry into the Early Modern period. Contemptus mundi is a running theme in the poetry of William Drummond of Hawthornden, and Burton's The Anatomy of Melancholy and the devotional verse of Jeremy Taylor would serve as further examples. The recurrence of bubonic plague offered a concrete visitation of the frailty of this life for devotional texts, as early as John Donne.

Contemptus mundi has been criticized as a pastoral of fear by the historian Jean Delumeau, and M. B. Pranger found the trope "Speaking of God after Auschwitz" to function as a "modern form of contemptus mundi".
