= Ralph Kinnard =

German-born American film director and acting coach

- Born: Ralf Graessner; Germany
- Education: Lee Strasberg Theatre and Film Institute, New York University Film School
- Known for: Film director, acting coach
- Spouse: Mónica Pasqualotto

Ralph Kinnard (born Ralf Graessner, in Germany) is an American film director and acting coach. He has won “Best Director” at the L.A. Arpa Foundation for Film, Music and Art and “Best Foreign Film”, NYC Downtown Film Festival, participated in Marche du Film del Cannes Film Festival “As you like it” (A MÍ ME GUSTA). The feature was also part of the official selection of the Kolkata International Film Festival 2009, the Mérida Film Festival (Mérida, Venezuela) 2009, the Havana Film Festival 2009 and the Margarita Film Festival 2009. He received the “MARA DE ORO” for best movie director in 2009.

== Biography ==
Born in Germany, he studied at the Andy Geer theater school in Munich at age 19. He then joined the Philippe Gaulier Performing Arts Institute in London; and he continued his studies in the Lee Strasberg Theatre and Film Institute, where he graduated in Acting and Directing. In 1996 he took filming courses in the New York University Film School New York University. In 1995 he directed The Chorus Girl and The Donahue Sisters in the Marilyn Monroe Theater in New York.

He worked as Director’s Assistant in plays like In Search of Strindberg at the Actors Studios, (NY 1995), Flushed for Akika Productions, (NYC 1996) and As she walked through the fair, with the BBC London (NYC 1996). He also had the opportunity of being Production Assistant in Woody Allen's CELEBRITY (1998).

He has directed short films such as: Brotherlove, (New York 1996); Slipped, (New York 1997) and Oda a la mujer (Caracas 2000). He was director’s assistant in Transgressions, for the BBC London/ New York, and for the German film Sausages for Columbia Tris-Star (New York 1997); he also directed plays like Buscando a Strindberg, (Teatro Doris Wells, Caracas 2000) and in Shakespeare interactivo (Teatro Doris Wells, Caracas 2001). In 2007 he worked as director in the short film Ausente (Caracas), which was selected to participate in the Los Angeles International Short Film Festival.

Kinnard has worked as an acting professor, lecturer and acting advisor for over 10 years working in every major TV channel in Venezuela. In 2008, he directed his first feature A Mí Me Gusta , that entered the official selection of the Kolkata International Film Festival.

== Filmography ==
- 2006 Francisco de Miranda - Pitt
- 2008 A Mi Me Gusta - Director.
- 2017 Miami Love Affair - Benedict. Also as director, writer, executive producer.

== Personal life ==
Kinnard's wife is Mónica Pasqualotto, a Venezuelan actress
