= Ranald MacDougall =

American screenwriter (1915–1973)

- Born: March 10, 1915; Schenectady, New York, U.S.
- Died: December 12, 1973 (aged 58); Pacific Palisades, California, U.S.
- Occupation: Screenwriter
- Spouses: Lucille Brophy (m. 1939; div. 1957); Nanette Fabray (m. 1957)
- Children: 4

Ranald MacDougall (March 10, 1915 – December 12, 1973) was an American screenwriter who scripted such films as Mildred Pierce (1945), The Unsuspected (1947), June Bride (1948), and The Naked Jungle (1954), and shared screenwriting credit for 1963's Cleopatra. He also directed a number of films, including 1957's Man on Fire with Bing Crosby and 1959's The World, the Flesh and the Devil, both of which featured actress Inger Stevens.

== Early years ==
Born on March 10, 1915, in Schenectady, New York, MacDougall came from an impoverished working-class family. His father, Harald L. MacDougall, was a crane operator and union organizer, whose frequent strikes forced MacDougall to leave school before finishing the eighth grade to help support the family. He held a variety of odd jobs, and during the Great Depression, he found work as an usher at Radio City Music Hall.

When MacDougall quit school, he became a messenger for Western Union in New York City. He used time between deliveries of messages to write scripts, and at night, he wrote poems, some of which were accepted for publication. While in Florida recovering from a bout of pneumonia, he was a bookkeeper, commercial fisherman, and waiter. By the time he was 18 years old, he was writing feature stories for newspapers in the South, as well as some scripts for radio.

== Career ==
He saw greater potential across the street in Rockefeller Center, where he was hired as a page, working alongside Gregory Peck. As a page, MacDougall had the opportunity to closely observe the radio industry, and in his spare time, he wrote and submitted scripts to his boss under pseudonyms, and was finally hired as a staff writer for NBC Radio despite being underaged at the time.

MacDougall first worked in radio as a continuity writer for NBC in 1936. By 1939, he was writing for The World's Best, a half-hour program of adaptations of literary masterpieces. In the summer of 1941, he worked on Defense for America, traveling around the United States with an NBC crew to present on-the-scene reports about industrial activities for defense. In addition to writing for the program, he reported and was assistant producer. While working for NBC, he wrote "documentaries on Americana" that were recorded in the United States and sent to the BBC in England as examples of the way American radio programs were written.

During World War II, MacDougall wrote for The Man Behind the Gun, a CBS radio program that dramatized personalized incidents of activities during warfare.

MacDougall left radio in 1944 to work in films, signing a contract with Warner Bros. He wrote the screenplay for the film Objective, Burma! (1945).

MacDougall's work on television included writing for The Nanette Fabray Show.

== President, WGA ==
MacDougall was President of the Writers Guild of America West from 1971 until 1973.

== Personal life ==
MacDougall was married to Lucille Brophy in 1939, by whom he had three children. Following their divorce, he married actress Nanette Fabray in 1957 by whom he had another son. He died of a heart attack in Pacific Palisades, California, at age 58.
