= Natalia Denegri =

Argentine-Italian-American television host

- Born: March 18, 1976 (age 50); Buenos Aires, Argentina
- Occupations: Television host, journalist, actress, producer, philanthropist, businesswoman
- Notable work: Corazones Guerreros

Natalia Denegri (born 18 March 1976) is an Argentine-Italian-American television host, journalist, actress, producer, philanthropist, and businesswoman. She is known for her humanitarian television program Corazones Guerreros, her work with the Hassenfeld Family Foundation, and her production of Emmy Award–winning documentaries addressing social and political issues in Latin America and the United States.

== Early life ==
Denegri was born in Buenos Aires, Argentina. She began her career in Argentina as an actress and television personality while also serving as a godmother and advocate for nonprofit organizations, particularly those supporting children with autism. Through this philanthropic work she was invited to the United States to participate in a university symposium on autism, where she presented on how the condition was being addressed in Argentina.

== Career ==
In November 2025, she received the U.S. Capitol Lifetime Achievement Award, presented by the International Academy of Chaplaincy at a ceremony held in the U.S. Capitol. The award was given in recognition of her international humanitarian work.

=== United States and Hassenfeld Foundation ===
During her first visit to the U.S., Denegri met Alan Hassenfeld, former CEO of Hasbro and chairman of the Hassenfeld Family Foundation. Under his mentorship she launched Corazones Guerreros on CNN en Español, later moving the program to Mega TV, where it is broadcast throughout the United States and Latin America. She was subsequently appointed the Foundation's official spokesperson for Latin America.

=== Humanitarian missions ===
With the Foundation, Denegri coordinated missions in La Guajira, Colombia (supporting the Wayúu community), Puerto Rico after Hurricanes Irma and Maria, Venezuela, Argentina, and the United States. In Puerto Rico, her team delivered more than US$100,000 in aid and evacuated over 300 patients to Miami. The mission was documented in the film Hope by director Alain Maiki. For this work she received recognition from the United States Congress.

In March 2022 she collaborated with Baires Grill, Miami Mayor Francis X. Suárez, and The Hachar Law Group to assist Ukrainian refugees arriving in Miami after Russia's invasion.

=== Corazones Guerreros ===
Since its debut in 2013, Corazones Guerreros has aired more than 450 episodes on CNN en Español and MegaTV. The program combines journalism with humanitarian aid and has received multiple Suncoast Emmy Awards and the Carteles Award.

=== Other television work ===
In 2013 Denegri co-hosted Atrevidas alongside Argentine journalist Nazarena Nobile.

Since 2025 she has been part of Univision’s Siéntese Quien Pueda, contributing weekly segments on entrepreneurship and empowerment.

=== Producer and Trinitus Productions ===
Through her production company Trinitus Productions, Denegri has produced documentaries addressing humanitarian and political crises, including the Venezuelan immigration crisis. These works have received international festival screenings and contributed to her total of 43 Suncoast Emmy Awards (28 personal, 15 through Trinitus).

Natalia Denegri has been approached to bring her extraordinary life to an international series—featuring never-before-revealed secrets, power, resilience, and a story of overcoming adversity. The project could take the form of a six-episode docuseries or a scripted series inspired by true events, exploring some of the most striking chapters of her life.

=== Business career ===
Denegri is a partner in Baires Grill, an Argentine restaurant chain in the U.S., with locations in Florida and New York. The chain was designated as the official restaurant of the Argentina national football team during its U.S. matches.

== Political activities ==
In January 2025 Denegri was one of the organizers of official galas during the presidential inauguration of Donald Trump, where she presented awards to international leaders including Argentine President Javier Milei.

Later that year she participated in the “Bienvenido Empresarios: Business & Policy Summit” at the White House, joining Hispanic business leaders and U.S. policymakers including Senators Ted Cruz and Rick Scott.

== Books ==
Denegri is the author of Corazones Guerreros: Stories of Life and Corazón de Mamá. She presented her works in Argentina, the United States, and Italy, where she personally gifted a copy to Pope Francis.

== Awards and recognition ==
- 43 Suncoast Emmy Awards
- Carteles Award
- Key to the City of Miami (2015)
- Recognition by the U.S. Congress (2017)
- People en Español’s 25 Most Powerful Hispanic Women (2018)
- Recognition by Miami Mayor Francis X. Suárez (2021)
- HOLA! Magazine's Top 100 Latina Powerhouse (2021)
- Callas Tribute Prize (2024, 2025)
- Martín Fierro Latino Award (2024)
- Martín Fierro de Cable (2024)
- Gold President's Volunteer Service Award by the White House (2025)
- United Doctors of America Humanitarian Award (2025)
