= World =

Totality of existing entities

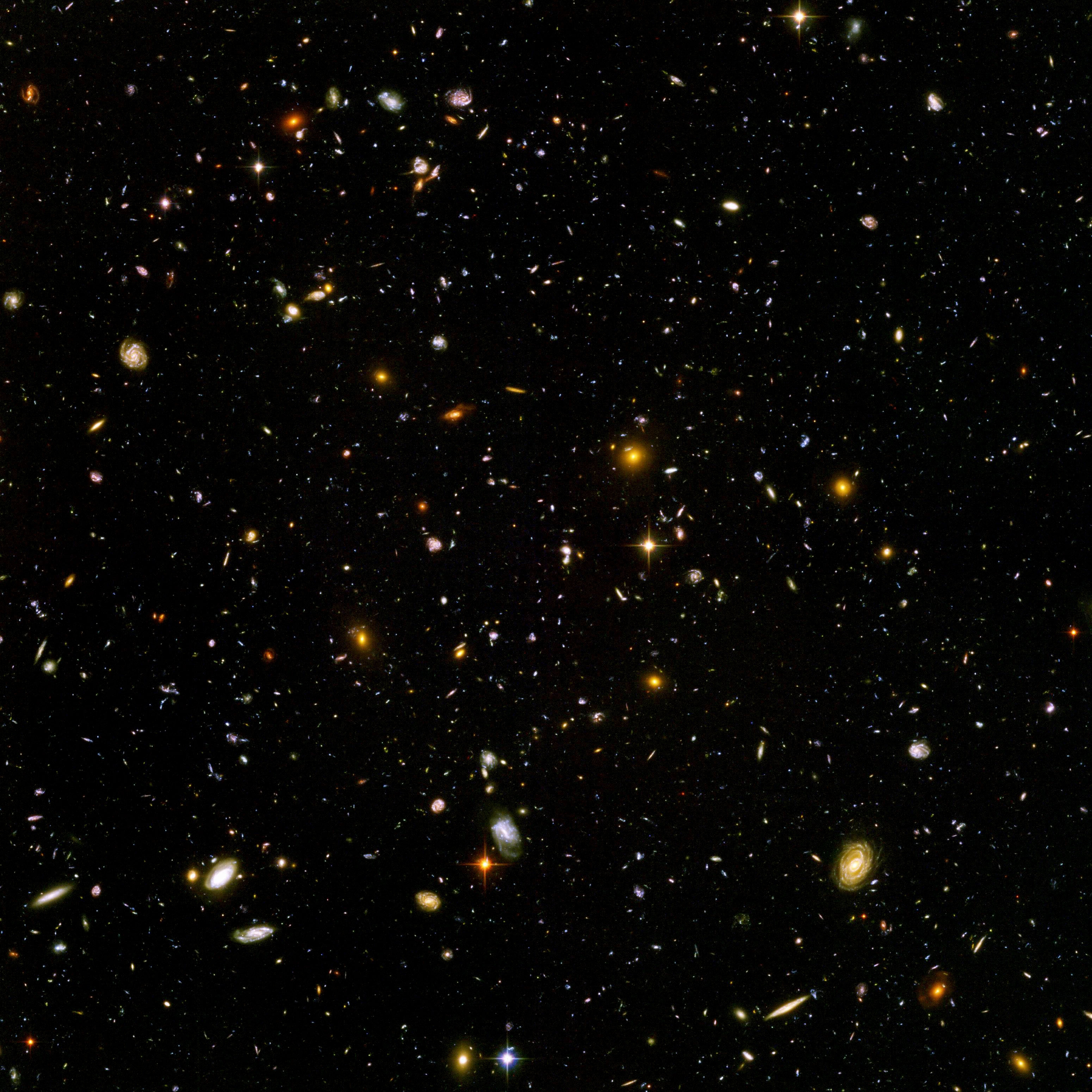
Image of the physical world, captured by the Hubble Space Telescope

A world is a totality of entities. In philosophy, the world is customarily viewed as all of existence or the whole of reality. Some conceptions see the world as unique, while others examine the character of entities that exist in the world or talk of a plurality of worlds, challenging the idea that the world is an all-inclusive whole. The term is also commonly used as a context-dependent expression to denote a specific domain of discourse and everything within it, such as the Earth and all life on it or the whole of human existence.

Theories of modality talk of possible worlds as complete and consistent ways how things could have been. Phenomenology, starting from the horizon of co-given objects present in the periphery of every experience, defines the world as the biggest horizon, or the "horizon of all horizons". In philosophy of mind, the world is contrasted with the mind as that which is represented by the mind.

Theology conceptualises the world in relation to God, for example, as God's creation, as identical to God, or as the two being interdependent. In religions, there is a tendency to downgrade the material or sensory world in favour of a spiritual world to be sought through religious practice. A comprehensive representation of the world and our place in it, as is found in religions, is known as a worldview. Cosmogony is the field that studies the origin or creation of the world, while eschatology refers to the science or doctrine of the last things or of the end of the world.

In various contexts, the term "world" takes a more restricted meaning associated, for example, with the Earth and all life on it, with humanity as a whole, or with an international or intercontinental scope. In this sense, world history refers to the history of humanity as a whole, and world politics is the discipline of political science studying issues that transcend nations and continents. Other examples include terms such as "world religion", "world language", "world government", "world war", "world population", "world economy", or "world championship".

== Etymology ==
The English word world comes from the Old English weorold. The Old English is a reflex of the Common Germanic *weraldiz, a compound of weraz 'man' and aldiz 'age', thus literally meaning roughly 'age of man'; this word led to Old Frisian warld, Old Saxon werold, Old Dutch werolt, Old High German weralt, and Old Norse verǫld.

The corresponding word in Latin is mundus, literally 'clean, elegant', itself a loan translation of Greek cosmos 'orderly arrangement'. While the Germanic word thus reflects a mythological notion of a "domain of Man" (compare Midgard), presumably as opposed to the divine sphere on the one hand and the chthonic sphere of the underworld on the other, the Greco-Latin term expresses a notion of creation as an act of establishing order out of chaos.

== Conceptions ==
Different fields often work with quite different conceptions of the essential features associated with the term "world". Some conceptions see the world as unique: there can be no more than one world. Others talk of a "plurality of worlds". Some see worlds as complex things composed of many substances as their parts while others hold that worlds are simple in the sense that there is only one substance: the world as a whole. Some characterise worlds in terms of objective spacetime while others define them relative to the horizon present in each experience. These different characterisations are not always exclusive: it may be possible to combine some without leading to a contradiction. Most of them agree that worlds are unified totalities.

=== Monism and pluralism ===
Monism is a thesis about oneness: that only one thing exists in a certain sense. The denial of monism is pluralism, the thesis that, in a certain sense, more than one thing exists. There are many forms of monism and pluralism, but in relation to the world as a whole, two are of special interest: existence monism/pluralism and priority monism/pluralism. Existence monism states that the world is the only concrete object there is. This means that all the concrete "objects" we encounter in our daily lives, including apples, cars and ourselves, are not truly objects in a strict sense. Instead, they are just dependent aspects of the world-object. Such a world-object is simple in the sense that it does not have any genuine parts. For this reason, it has also been referred to as "blobject" since it lacks an internal structure like a blob. Priority monism allows that there are other concrete objects besides the world. But it holds that these objects do not have the most fundamental form of existence, that they somehow depend on the existence of the world. The corresponding forms of pluralism state that the world is complex in the sense that it is made up of concrete, independent objects.

=== Scientific cosmology ===
Scientific cosmology can be defined as the science of the universe, examining the physical world at the largest observable scale. One common definition of the universe found in this field is as "[t]he totality of all space and time; all that is, has been, and will be". World-conceptions in this field differ both concerning their notion of spacetime and of the contents of spacetime. The theory of relativity plays a central role in modern cosmology and its conception of space and time. A difference from its predecessors is that it conceives space and time not as distinct dimensions but as a single four-dimensional manifold called spacetime. This can be seen in special relativity in relation to the Minkowski metric, which includes both spatial and temporal components in its definition of distance. General relativity goes one step further by integrating the concept of mass into the concept of spacetime as its curvature. Quantum cosmology conceives the universe as one wave function expressing the probability of finding particles in a given location.

=== Theories of modality ===
The world-concept plays a role in many modern theories of modality, sometimes in the form of possible worlds. A possible world is a complete and consistent way how things could have been. The actual world is a possible world since the way things are is a way things could have been. There are many other ways things could have been besides how they actually are. For example, Hillary Clinton did not win the 2016 US election, but she could have won. So there is a possible world in which she did. There is a vast number of possible worlds, one corresponding to each such difference, no matter how small or big, as long as no outright contradictions are introduced this way.

Possible worlds are often conceived as abstract objects, for example, in terms of non-obtaining states of affairs or as maximally consistent sets of propositions. On such a view, they can even be seen as belonging to the actual world. Another way to conceive possible worlds, made famous by David Lewis, is as concrete entities. On this conception, there is no important difference between the actual world and possible worlds: both are conceived as concrete, inclusive and spatiotemporally connected. The only difference is that the actual world is the world we live in, while other possible worlds are not inhabited by us but by our counterparts. Everything within a world is spatiotemporally connected to everything else but the different worlds do not share a common spacetime: They are spatiotemporally isolated from each other. This is what makes them separate worlds.

It has been suggested that, besides possible worlds, there are also impossible worlds. Possible worlds are ways things could have been, so impossible worlds are ways things could not have been. Such worlds involve a contradiction, like a world in which Hillary Clinton both won and lost the 2016 US election. Both possible and impossible worlds have in common the idea that they are totalities of their constituents.

=== Phenomenology ===
Within phenomenology, worlds are defined in terms of horizons of experiences. When we perceive an object, like a house, we do not just experience this object at the centre of our attention but also various other objects surrounding it, given in the periphery. The term "horizon" refers to these co-given objects, which are usually experienced only in a vague, indeterminate manner. The perception of a house involves various horizons, corresponding to the neighbourhood, the city, the country, the Earth, etc. In this context, the world is the biggest horizon or the "horizon of all horizons". It is common among phenomenologists to understand the world not just as a spatiotemporal collection of objects but as additionally incorporating various other relations between these objects. These relations include, for example, indication-relations that help us anticipate one object given the appearances of another object and means-end-relations or functional involvements relevant for practical concerns.

=== Philosophy of mind ===
In philosophy of mind, the term "world" is commonly used in contrast to the term "mind" as that which is represented by the mind. This is sometimes expressed by stating that there is a gap between mind and world and that this gap needs to be overcome for representation to be successful. One problem in philosophy of mind is to explain how the mind is able to bridge this gap and to enter into genuine mind-world-relations, for example, in the form of perception, knowledge or action. This is necessary for the world to be able to rationally constrain the activity of the mind. According to a realist position, the world is something distinct and independent from the mind. Idealists conceive of the world as partially or fully determined by the mind. Immanuel Kant's transcendental idealism, for example, posits that the spatiotemporal structure of the world is imposed by the mind on reality but lacks independent existence otherwise. A more radical idealist conception of the world can be found in Berkeley's subjective idealism, which holds that the world as a whole, including all everyday objects like tables, cats, trees and ourselves, "consists of nothing but minds and ideas".

=== Theology ===
Different theological positions hold different conceptions of the world based on its relation to God. Classical theism states that God is wholly distinct from the world. But the world depends for its existence on God, both because God created the world and because He maintains or conserves it. This is sometimes understood in analogy to how humans create and conserve ideas in their imagination, with the difference being that the divine mind is vastly more powerful. On such a view, God has absolute, ultimate reality in contrast to the lower ontological status ascribed to the world. God's involvement in the world is often understood along the lines of a personal, benevolent God who looks after and guides His creation. Deists agree with theists that God created the world but deny any subsequent, personal involvement in it. Pantheists reject the separation between God and world. Instead, they claim that the two are identical. This means that there is nothing to the world that does not belong to God and that there is nothing to God beyond what is found in the world. Panentheism constitutes a middle ground between theism and pantheism. Against theism, it holds that God and the world are interrelated and depend on each other. Against pantheism, it holds that there is no outright identity between the two.

=== Schematic ===
Another approach understands the concept of world in a schematic sense: as context-dependent expressions that stand for the current domain of discourse. This matches the use of the word common in everyday language, for example, with reference to the world of music, the world of business, the world of football, the world of experience or the Asian world. So in the expression "Around the World in Eighty Days", the term "world" refers to the earth while in "the Roman world" it refers to an historic era. The different fields of science precieve natural phenomena along such different lines that scientific historian Thomas Kuhn described them a occuping different worlds.

In a detailed analysis of the world concept, Bas van Fraassen concludes that world is :

a context-dependent term which indicates the domain of discourse of the sentence in which it occurs, on the occasion of utterance. It plays this role sometimes by denoting the domain (a set), and sometimes by purporting to denote an entity of which the members of the domain.

He argues that this schematic view of the concept of world is the only useful one. Fraassen argues that world as a totality of entities is not proven by any scientific work and not useful to conjecture in philosophy. Fraassen's approach can be used to bolster Goodman's arguments about muliple worlds when each world becomes a personal domain.

== History of philosophy ==
In philosophy, the term world has several possible meanings. In some contexts, it refers to everything that makes up reality or the physical universe. In others, it can mean have a specific ontological sense (see world disclosure). While clarifying the concept of world has arguably always been among the basic tasks of Western philosophy, this theme appears to have been raised explicitly only at the start of the twentieth century,

=== Plato ===
Plato is well known for his theory of forms, which posits the existence of two different worlds: the sensible world and the intelligible world. The sensible world is the world we live in, filled with changing physical things we can see, touch and interact with. The intelligible world is the world of invisible, eternal, changeless forms like goodness, beauty, unity and sameness. Plato ascribes a lower ontological status to the sensible world, which only imitates the world of forms. This is due to the fact that physical things exist only to the extent that they participate in the forms that characterise them, while the forms themselves have an independent manner of existence. In this sense, the sensible world is a mere replication of the perfect exemplars found in the world of forms: it never lives up to the original. In the allegory of the cave, Plato compares the physical things we are familiar with to mere shadows of the real things. But not knowing the difference, the prisoners in the cave mistake the shadows for the real things.

=== Wittgenstein ===
Two definitions that were both put forward in the 1920s, however, suggest the range of available opinion. "The world is everything that is the case", wrote Ludwig Wittgenstein in his influential Tractatus Logico-Philosophicus, first published in 1921. However by "everything that is the case" he meant collection of all facts, not the collection of all objects.

=== Heidegger ===
Martin Heidegger, meanwhile, argued that "the surrounding world is different for each of us, and notwithstanding that we move about in a common world".

=== Eugen Fink ===
"World" is one of the key terms in Eugen Fink's philosophy. He thinks that there is a misguided tendency in western philosophy to understand the world as one enormously big thing containing all the small everyday things we are familiar with. He sees this view as a form of forgetfulness of the world and tries to oppose it by what he calls the "cosmological difference": the difference between the world and the inner-worldly things it contains. On his view, the world is the totality of the inner-worldly things that transcends them. It is itself groundless but it provides a ground for things. It therefore cannot be identified with a mere container. Instead, the world gives appearance to inner-worldly things, it provides them with a place, a beginning and an end. One difficulty in investigating the world is that we never encounter it since it is not just one more thing that appears to us. This is why Fink uses the notion of play or playing to elucidate the nature of the world. He sees play as a symbol of the world that is both part of it and that represents it. Play usually comes with a form of imaginary play-world involving various things relevant to the play. But just like the play is more than the imaginary realities appearing in it so the world is more than the actual things appearing in it.

=== Goodman ===
The concept of worlds plays a central role in Nelson Goodman's late philosophy. He argues that we need to posit different worlds in order to account for the fact that there are different incompatible truths found in reality. Two truths are incompatible if they ascribe incompatible properties to the same thing. This happens, for example, when we assert both that the earth moves and that the earth is at rest. These incompatible truths correspond to two different ways of describing the world: heliocentrism and geocentrism. Goodman terms such descriptions "world versions". He holds a correspondence theory of truth: a world version is true if it corresponds to a world. Incompatible true world versions correspond to different worlds. It is common for theories of modality to posit the existence of a plurality of possible worlds. But Goodman's theory is different since it posits a plurality not of possible but of actual worlds. Such a position is in danger of involving a contradiction: there cannot be a plurality of actual worlds if worlds are defined as maximally inclusive wholes. This danger may be avoided by interpreting Goodman's world-concept not as maximally inclusive wholes in the absolute sense but in relation to its corresponding world-version: a world contains all and only the entities that its world-version describes.

== Religion ==
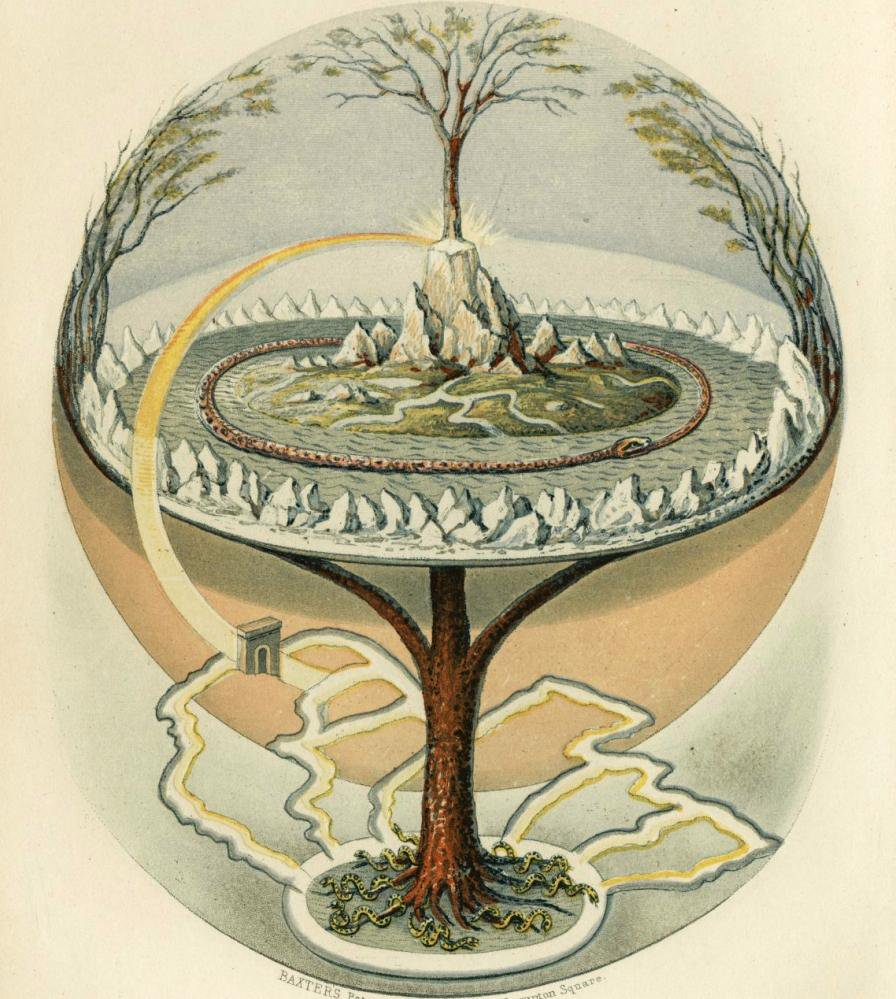
Yggdrasil, an attempt to reconstruct the Norse world tree which connects the heavens, the world, and the underworld.

Mythological cosmologies depict the world as centred on an axis mundi and delimited by a boundary such as a world ocean, a world serpent or similar.

=== Hinduism ===
Hinduism constitutes a family of religious-philosophical views. These views present perspectives on the nature and role of the world. Samkhya philosophy, for example, is a metaphysical dualism that understands reality as comprising 2 parts: purusha and prakriti. The term "purusha" stands for the individual conscious self that each of "us" possesses. Prakriti, on the other hand, is the 1 world inhabited by all these selves. Samkhya understands this world as a world of matter governed by the law of cause and effect. The term "matter" is understood in a sense in this tradition including physical and mental aspects. This is reflected in the doctrine of tattvas, according to which prakriti is made up of 23 principles or elements of reality. These principles include physical elements, like water or earth, and mental aspects, like intelligence or sense-impressions. The relation between purusha and prakriti is conceived as 1 of observation: purusha is the conscious self aware of the world of prakriti and does not causally interact with it.

A conception of the world is present in Advaita Vedanta, the monist school among the Vedanta schools. Unlike the realist position defended in Samkhya philosophy, Advaita Vedanta sees the world of multiplicity as an illusion, referred to as Maya. This illusion includes impression of existing as separate experiencing selfs called Jivas. Instead, Advaita Vedanta teaches that on the most fundamental level of reality, referred to as Brahman, there exists no plurality or difference. All there is is 1 all-encompassing self: Atman. Ignorance is seen as the source of this illusion, which results in bondage to the world of mere appearances. Liberation is possible in the course of overcoming this illusion by acquiring the knowledge of Brahman, according to Advaita Vedanta.

=== Christianity ===
Contemptus mundi is the name given to the belief that the world, in all its vanity, is nothing more than a futile attempt to hide from God by stifling our desire for the good and the holy. This view has been characterised as a "pastoral of fear" by historian Jean Delumeau. "The world, the flesh, and the devil" is a traditional division of the sources of temptation.

Orbis Catholicus is a Latin phrase meaning "Catholic world", per the expression Urbi et Orbi, and refers to that area of Christendom under papal supremacy.

=== Islam ===
In Islam, the term "dunya" is used for the world. Its meaning is derived from the root word "dana", a term for "near". It is associated with the temporal, sensory world and earthly concerns, i.e. with this world in contrast to the spiritual world. Religious teachings warn of a tendency to seek happiness in this world and advise a more ascetic lifestyle concerned with the afterlife. Other strands in Islam recommend a balanced approach.

=== Mandaeism ===
In Mandaean cosmology, the world or earthly realm is known as Tibil. It is separated from the World of Light (alma d-nhūra) above and the World of Darkness (alma d-hšuka) below by aether (ayar).

== Related terms and problems ==
=== Worldviews ===
Scientific worldview

A worldview is a comprehensive representation of the world and our place in it. As a representation, it is a subjective perspective of the world and thereby different from the world it represents. All higher animals need to represent their environment in some way in order to navigate it. But it has been argued that only humans possess a representation encompassing enough to merit the term "worldview". Philosophers of worldviews commonly hold that the understanding of any object depends on a worldview constituting the background on which this understanding can take place. This may affect not just our intellectual understanding of the object in question but the experience of it in general. It is therefore impossible to assess one's worldview from a neutral perspective since this assessment already presupposes the worldview as its background. Some hold that each worldview is based on a single hypothesis that promises to solve all the problems of our existence we may encounter. On this interpretation, the term is closely associated to the worldviews given by different religions. Worldviews offer orientation not just in theoretical matters but also in practical matters. For this reason, they usually include answers to the question of the meaning of life and other evaluative components about what matters and how we should act. A worldview can be unique to one individual but worldviews are usually shared by many people within a certain culture or religion.

=== Many worlds ===
A variety of ideas about a plurality of worlds has been discussed as far back as Gottfried Wilhelm Leibniz and his concept of multiple possible worlds. Nelson Goodman revived this idea but insisted these worlds were all actual worlds. Multiple worlds seems to contradict the idea that the world is all-inclusive: any one of the multiple worlds would seem to not include the others. Understood this way, a world can neither have other worlds besides itself or be part of something bigger. If, however, each world is constructed by the cognitive actions of a single person, there is no contradiction. Each personal viewpoint contains the totality of existence as far as that person is concerned.

The science of quantum mechanics includes a promenent many-worlds interpretation (MWI), which carries this reference even in its name. In the MWI every observation of a quantum interaction that can yield more than one possible answer represents a branch yielding one new world for each branch. We only experience one branch or world. Each world in MWI corresponds to the everyday notion of a world, but does not correspond to "everything that exists". Everything that exists includes all of the other branches. Each world has a unique past but a multitude of future branches.

=== Cosmogony ===
Cosmogony is the field that studies the origin or creation of the world. This includes both scientific cosmogony and creation myths found in various religions. The dominant theory in scientific cosmogony is the Big Bang theory, according to which both space, time and matter have their origin in one initial singularity occurring about 13.8 billion years ago. This singularity was followed by an expansion that allowed the universe to sufficiently cool down for the formation of subatomic particles and later atoms. These initial elements formed giant clouds, which would then coalesce into stars and galaxies. Non-scientific creation myths are found in many cultures and are often enacted in rituals expressing their symbolic meaning. They can be categorised concerning their contents. Types often found include creation from nothing, from chaos or from a cosmic egg.

=== Eschatology ===
Eschatology refers to the science or doctrine of the last things or of the end of the world. It is traditionally associated with religion, specifically with the Abrahamic religions. In this form, it may include teachings both of the end of each individual human life and of the end of the world as a whole. But it has been applied to other fields as well, for example, in the form of physical eschatology, which includes scientifically based speculations about the far future of the universe. According to some models, there will be a Big Crunch in which the whole universe collapses back into a singularity, possibly resulting in a second Big Bang afterward. But current astronomical evidence seems to suggest that our universe will continue to expand indefinitely.

=== World history ===
World history studies the world from a historical perspective. Unlike other approaches to history, it employs a global viewpoint. It deals less with individual nations and civilisations, which it usually approaches at a high level of abstraction. Instead, it concentrates on wider regions and zones of interaction, often interested in how people, goods and ideas move from one region to another. It includes comparisons of different societies and civilisations as well as considering wide-ranging developments with a long-term global impact like the process of industrialisation. Contemporary world history is dominated by three main research paradigms determining the periodisation into different epochs. One is based on productive relations between humans and nature. The two most important changes in history in this respect were the introduction of agriculture and husbandry concerning the production of food, which started around 10,000 to 8,000 BCE and is sometimes termed the Neolithic Revolution, and the Industrial Revolution, which started around 1760 CE and involved the transition from manual to industrial manufacturing. Another paradigm, focusing on culture and religion instead, is based on Karl Jaspers' theories about the Axial Age, a time in which various new forms of religious and philosophical thoughts appeared in several separate parts of the world around the time between 800 and 200 BCE. A third periodisation is based on the relations between civilisations and societies. According to this paradigm, history can be divided into three periods in relation to the dominant region in the world: Middle Eastern dominance before 500 BCE, Eurasian cultural balance until 1500 CE and Western dominance since 1500 CE. Big History employs an even wider framework than world history by putting human history into the context of the history of the universe as a whole. It starts with the Big Bang and traces the formation of galaxies, the Solar System, the Earth, its geological eras, the evolution of life and humans until the present day.

=== World politics ===
World politics, also referred to as global politics or international relations, is the discipline of political science studying issues of interest to the world that transcend nations and continents. It aims to explain complex patterns found in the social world that are often related to the pursuit of power, order and justice, usually in the context of globalization. It focuses not just on the relations between nation-states but also considers other transnational actors, like multinational corporations, terrorist groups, or non-governmental organisations. For example, it tries to explain events such as the September 11 attacks, the 2003 invasion of Iraq or the 2008 financial crisis.

Various theories have been proposed in order to deal with the complexity involved in formulating such explanations. These theories are sometimes divided into realism, liberalism and constructivism. Realists see nation-states as the main actors in world politics. They constitute an anarchical international system without any overarching power to control their behaviour. They are seen as sovereign agents that, determined by human nature, act according to their national self-interest. Military force may play an important role in the ensuing struggle for power between states, but diplomacy and cooperation are also key mechanisms for nations to achieve their goals. Liberalists acknowledge the importance of states but they also emphasise the role of transnational actors, like the United Nations or the World Trade Organization. They see humans as perfectible and stress the role of democracy in this process. The emergent order in world politics, on this perspective, is more complex than a mere balance of power since more different agents and interests are involved in its production. Constructivism ascribes more importance to the agency of individual humans than realism and liberalism. It understands the social world as a construction of the people living in it. This leads to an emphasis on the possibility of change. If the international system is an anarchy of nation-states, as the realists hold, then this is only so because we made it this way and may change since this is not prefigured by human nature, according to the constructivists.

== See also ==
- Earth
- Empiricism
- Globe
- Holon
- Universe
- World map
