= The Astronaut (1972 film) =

- Genre: Drama
- Teleplay by: Gerald Di Pego; Charles Kuenstle; Robert Biheller
- Story by: Charles Kuenstle; Robert Biheller
- Directed by: Robert Michael Lewis
- Starring: Susan Clark; Jackie Cooper; Monte Markham
- Music by: Gil Melle
- Country of origin: United States
- Original language: English

Production
- Producer: Harve Bennett
- Production locations: Universal Studios – 100 Universal City Plaza, Universal City, California
- Cinematography: Alric Edens
- Editors: Les Green; John Kaufman
- Running time: 73 minutes
- Production companies: Silverton Productions; Universal Television

Original release
- Network: ABC
- Release: January 8, 1972

The Astronaut is a 1972 American made-for-television science fiction film directed by Robert Michael Lewis and starring Susan Clark, Jackie Cooper, and Monte Markham. It follows a man who has been hired to impersonate an astronaut who died during the first crewed mission to Mars. The movie was made for ABC for its movie of the week franchise. Real-life astronaut Wally Schirra appears in a cameo role as himself.

== Plot ==
Television coverage of Brice Randolph, the first astronaut on the surface of Mars, is interrupted, indicating that the signal has been lost. Shortly afterward, Eddie Reese is recruited and shown what happened after the TV signal was interrupted: Brice reported something penetrating his EVA suit and soon expired. The other astronaut lifted off alone.

NASA, fearing their project will be canceled, needs to keep it a secret until they have answers about what exactly happened. Reese undergoes surgical alterations and begins learning his role as Brice. Upon the arrival of the spacecraft back on Earth, the splashdown site is altered so that the press is unaware of Reese being brought to join the returning space crew. Reese, maintaining the cover, is now tasked with playing his role with the dead man's wife, Gail. Uneasy about being intimate with another man's wife, Reese unwittingly betrays himself to her, raising her suspicions.

Eventually, NASA determines what happened on Mars and is ready to let Reese out of the masquerade. However, Reese and Gail are willing to carry on as if he is Brice Randolph. Reese then hears from a boy, who asked for an autograph, that the Soviets have just launched their own mission to land on Mars. NASA does not warn the Soviets of the dangers that await them; however, Reese and Gail decide to reveal the truth.

== Cast ==
Actor	Role
Jackie Cooper	Kurt Anderson
Monte Markham	Eddie Reese
Monte Markham	Col. Brice Randolph
Richard Anderson	Dr. Wylie
Robert Lansing	John Phillips
Susan Clark	Gail Randolph
John Lupton	Don Masters
Walter Brooke	Tom Everett
James Sikking	Astronaut Higgins
Paul Kent	Carl Samuels

== Production ==
Robert Michael Lewis was hired to direct The Astronaut. Harve Bennett was hired to produce the film. The Astronaut was written by Gerald Di Pego, Charles Kuenstle, and Robert Biheller.

== Reception ==
When The Astronaut aired, the Apollo missions to the moon were still under way. The ensuing TV shows and films like Capricorn One would trod the same ground. Author Murray Pomerance wrote in his book Johnny Depp Starts Here that the film was modeled after Gene Fowler Jr.'s I Married a Monster from Outer Space. Pomerance thought the character Gail Randolph was a woman capable of knowing, and therefore recognizing the gentiles of her husband..

== See also ==
- List of American films of 1972
