= The world, the flesh, and the devil (disambiguation) =

The world, the flesh, and the devil are often traditionally described as the three enemies of the soul in Christian theology.

The world, the flesh, and the devil may also refer to:

- The World, the Flesh & the Devil: An Enquiry into the Future of the Three Enemies of the Rational Soul, a 1929 non-fiction book by J.D. Bernal
- The World, the Flesh and the Devil (1891 novel), an English novel by Mary Elizabeth Braddon
- The World, the Flesh and the Devil (1914 film), a British drama film
- The World, the Flesh and the Devil (1959 film), an American science fiction film
- The World, the Flesh and the Devil, a 1985 Scottish historical novel, by Reay Tannahill

== See also ==
- The World, the Flesh, and Father Smith, a 1944 novel by Bruce Marshall
- The World, the Flesh, the Devil, a 1932 British crime film
- Flesh and the Devil, a 1926 romantic drama silent film
