= The World, the Flesh and the Devil (1959 film) =

Film by Ranald MacDougall

- Theatrical release poster
- Directed by: Ranald MacDougall
- Screenplay by: Ranald MacDougall
- Based on: "End of the World" by Ferdinand Reyher; The Purple Cloud; 1901 novel by M. P. Shiel
- Produced by: Sol C. Siegel; George Englund; Harry Belafonte (uncredited)
- Starring: Harry Belafonte; Inger Stevens; Mel Ferrer
- Cinematography: Harold J. Marzorati
- Edited by: Harold F. Kress
- Music by: Miklós Rózsa
- Distributed by: Metro-Goldwyn-Mayer
- Release date: April 23, 1959 (Cleveland)
- Running time: 95 minutes
- Country: United States
- Language: English
- Budget: $1,659,000
- Box office: $1,085,000 (rentals)

The World, the Flesh and the Devil is a 1959 American science fiction doomsday film written and directed by Ranald MacDougall. The film stars Harry Belafonte, who was then at the peak of his film career. The film is set in a post-apocalyptic world with very few human survivors. It is based on two sources: the 1901 novel The Purple Cloud by M. P. Shiel and the story "End of the World" by Ferdinand Reyher.

== Plot ==
Black mine inspector Ralph Burton becomes trapped in a cave-in at a Pennsylvania coal mine. He can hear rescuers digging towards him, but after five days they slow down and then stop completely, along with the drainage pumps keeping the shaft from flooding. Ralph frantically digs his own way out, but upon emerging from the mine, he finds a world devoid of any people, living or dead. Discarded newspapers provide an explanation: one proclaims "UN Retaliates For Use Of Atomic Poison", another that "Millions Flee From Cities! End Of The World". Ralph later plays tapes at a radio station and learns that an unknown country had dispersed large quantities of radioactive sodium isotopes into the atmosphere. The resulting lethal dust cloud spread around the world, killing every human who came into contact with it over a five-day period before the isotopes decayed into a harmless state.

Ralph travels to New York City in search of survivors, but in vain. He restores power to a building where he takes up residence. To stave off loneliness, he takes in a pair of mannequins. As the solitude starts to become intolerable, he throws a mannequin off the building, and hears a scream. Sarah Crandall, a White woman in her early twenties, had been living in the city and surreptitiously observing Ralph for some time, but was afraid to reveal herself. She screamed because she thought Ralph had committed suicide.

Ralph, an engineer, gets utilities working again and raises their standard of living, but the two remain in separate apartment buildings. Even as they become friends and grow closer, vestiges of racial division become evident when Sarah casually uses the phrase that she is "free, white, and 21" to describe her ability to make decisions. Ralph describes the phrase as "an arrow in my guts." In the same conversation, Sarah laments that "there is nobody left to marry." Resentful, Ralph refuses Sarah's suggestion that she move into his apartment building. Ralph maintains his distance when it becomes clear that Sarah is developing stronger feelings for him, unsure how she will react if they discover others alive. Despite living in a post-apocalyptic world, tensions remain that were instilled by the mores earned in a racially segregated American society.

Ralph regularly broadcasts on the radio in the hope of contacting other survivors, and eventually receives a transmission in French, confirming there are others. One day, ill white man Benson Thacker arrives by boat. Ralph and Sarah nurse him back to health, but once he recovers, Ben sets his sights on Sarah and sees Ralph as a rival. Ralph is torn by conflicting emotions. He avoids Sarah as much as possible to give Ben every opportunity to win her affections, but cannot quite bring himself to leave the city.

Ben finally grows tired of the whole situation, realizing he stands little chance with Sarah as long as Ralph remains nearby. He warns Ralph that the next time he sees him, he will try to kill him. The two armed men hunt each other through the empty streets. Finally, Ralph passes by the United Nations headquarters, climbs the steps in Ralph Bunche Park, and reads the inscription "They shall beat their swords into plowshares. And their spears into pruning hooks. Nation shall not lift up sword against nation. Neither shall they learn war any more", from the Book of Isaiah. He throws down his rifle and goes unarmed to confront Ben, who in turn finds himself unable to shoot his foe. Defeated, he starts walking away. Sarah appears. When Ralph starts to turn away from her, she makes him take her hand; then she calls to Ben and gives him her other hand. Together, the three walk down the street to build a new future together. The film ends not with "The End" but with "The Beginning."

== Cast ==
- Harry Belafonte as Ralph Burton
- Inger Stevens as Sarah Crandall
- Mel Ferrer as Benson Thacker

== Production ==
Paramount wanted to produce this film under a different title in 1940 but it was delayed. Paramount revisited the project in 1945; however, by this time many studios were making films that dealt with nuclear warfare after the atomic bombings on Japan, so with the market saturated, production once again was put on hold. It wasn't until 1956 that Sol C. Siegel purchased the rights to The Purple Cloud and thus that The World, The Flesh and The Devil would finally be produced. With this film, Siegel held a strong ideal and hope that blending the issues of racial tension and potential nuclear conflict would catalyze audiences to find some kind of resolution to both.

Harry Belafonte's production company, Harbel Productions, helped to co-produce the film. With his company, Belafonte hoped to create films that would accurately depict African-American lives and experiences as well as promote an African-American presence in Hollywood filmmaking. The World, The Flesh and The Devil was the first film that Harbel helped to produce.

Co-producer Siegel reached out to Belafonte thinking that he would be a good choice for the role of Ralph and that Harbel would benefit from the guidance of Siegel's production advising. Siegel believed that casting Belafonte would add gravitas to the film's story and appeal to a wider array of audiences and races. Belafonte agreed to sign on even with the script yet to be finished. He admired how interracial relationships became the focus of the film. However, these feelings would later change.

According to multiple members of the production team, the original ending was reshot for various reasons: scene quality differing between shooting locations, production office arguments, and the effect the original ending being different than what was artistically intended. The new ending that was used instead received some negative critical attention from audiences as well as cast members. Apparently, all three co-stars, Inger Stevens, Mel Ferrer, and Harry Belafonte, complained to Siegel during production that they were concerned by the representation of race in the movie.

Harry Belafonte was paid $350,000 against 50% of the net profits.

== Release and reception ==
=== Box office ===
The film had its premiere in Cleveland, Ohio on April 23, 1959. According to Metro-Goldwyn-Mayer records, the film earned theatrical rentals of $585,000 in the US and Canada and $500,000 elsewhere, resulting in a loss of $1,442,000.

=== Critical response ===
While The World, The Flesh and The Devil was praised for its cinematic quality, it also received quite a bit of negative criticism after its release. Many complained that the ending lacked any real message or significance, especially about race and interracial relationships. The film was released five years after the beginning of the American Civil Rights Movement, and critics felt let down by its alleged failure to solve any racial conflicts since the three survivors band together in the end, making their trials and tribulations throughout the movie amount to nothing. A 1959 review of the film from Time stated that,

In this instance, the audience is asked to believe that when most of humanity has been wiped out by a cloud of radioactive sodium, the three people who have managed to save their skins will spend most of their time worrying about the color of them [...] The story falls into the predictable triangular pattern, which soon resolves into the predictable eternal question: Which boy will get the girl? [...] the answer is intended to answer the race question, but since Actor Belafonte's skin seems just about as light as Actor Ferrer's, the audience may justifiably wonder if the question itself is not almost academic.

While New York Times critic Bosley Crowther complained that the ending of the movie was unreal and forced:

To be sure, Mr. Reyher and Mr. MacDougall have attempted to suggest an ideal by having the three walk hand in hand down Wall Street at the end, after the men have had a fight. But this is such an obvious contrivance and so cozily theatrical that you wouldn't be surprised to see the windows of the buildings suddenly crowded with reintegrated people, cheering happily and flinging ticker tape.

MacDougall and the producers found it convenient that the three of them walked together at the end of the film because interracial relationships were forbidden. Recent scholars and critics have praised the film for choosing to go against featuring an all-white cast, although still find great fault in the racial issues that it has, feeling that it rather makes the topics of race, integration, and nuclear war more divided—the opposite of what was intended by the producers and a major disappointment to audiences' expectations of seeing a fully fledged interracial couple on screen. The ending also caused confusion surrounding the message behind the platonic nature of Ralph, Sarah, and Ben, which then impacted the entire message of the film as well. Many critics have stated that the lack of a victor between Ralph and Ben, and thus a lack of a final couple, left an impression that was not only unrealistic in the post-apocalyptic sense but that also seemed as more of a mockery of the issues the film was trying to address.

== See also ==
- "The Comet", a 1920 short story by W. E. B. Du Bois
- Five, (1951) the first nuclear post-apocalyptic film produced and directed by Arch Oboler
- Survival film, about the film genre, with a list of related films
- Last Woman on Earth, a 1960 film directed by Roger Corman
- The Quiet Earth (1985), cited as "an unofficial remake from New Zealand"
- Z for Zachariah (2015), a film with a very similar premise
- The world, the flesh, and the devil (disambiguation)
