= Charles Kuenstle =

American actor and writer

Charles Kuenstle (b May 3, 1936) is an American writer and actor.

He studied at Baylor University and appeared as a guest star on many American TV shows of the 1960s and 1970s, including a regular role as Sgt. Clem Garnet on Twelve O'Clock High, and many appearances in various roles on Gunsmoke.

His first writing credit was the Burt Reynolds TV movie Hunters Are for Killing.

He was one of the writers on Airport '77.

== Filmography ==
=== Writer ===
- Hunters Are for Killing (1970)
- The Astronaut (1972)
- Death Race (1973)
- Airport '77 (1977)

=== Actor ===
- Gunsmoke (1963-1972)
  - "Pa Hack's Brood" (1963) as Lonnie
  - "The Wrong Man" (1966) as Wilton Kyle
  - "My Father, My Son" (1966) as Bernie Jeffords
  - "The Wrecker" (1967) as Luke
  - "Hard Luck Henry" (1967) as Homer Haggen
  - "Slocum" (1968) as 2nd Cowboy
  - "The Twisted Heritage" (1969) as Elan Dagget
  - "The Devil's Outpost" (1969) as Kelly
  - "MacGraw" (1969) as Wilkes
  - "The Lost" (1971) as Valjean Mather
  - "Blind Man's Buff" (1972) as Hank McCall
- Twelve O'Clock High (1965) as Sgt. Clem Garnet
