= Ike Jones =

American film producer and actor (1929–2014)

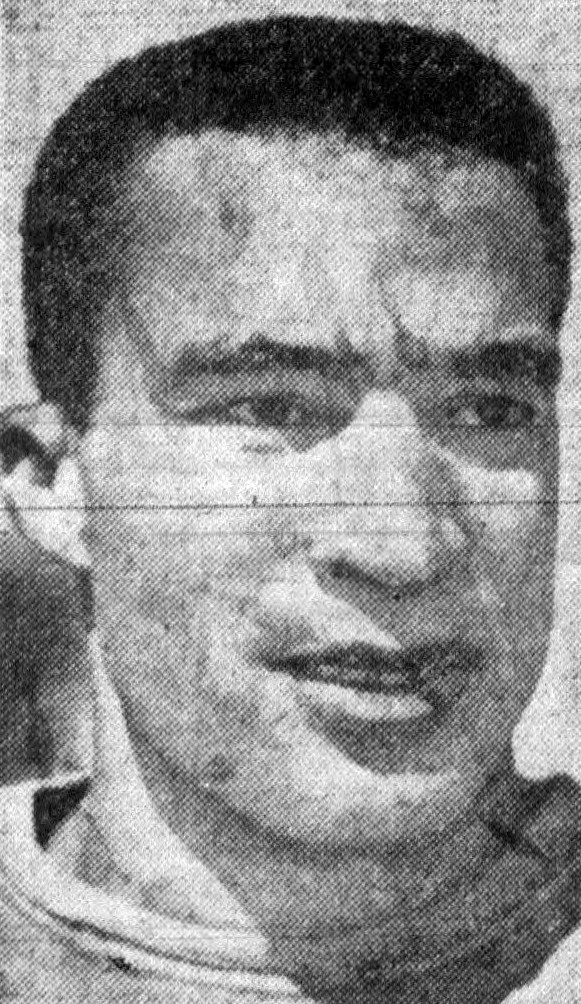
- Jones, circa 1953
- Born: Isaac Lolette Jones; December 23, 1929; Santa Monica, California, US
- Died: October 5, 2014 (aged 84); Los Angeles, California, US
- Education: Santa Monica High School; UCLA School of Theater, Film and Television
- Occupations: Film producer; actor
- Years active: 1952–1981
- Spouse: Inger Stevens (m. 1961; died 1970)

Isaac Lolette Jones (December 23, 1929 – October 5, 2014) was an American film producer and actor. In June 1953, he became the first Black American graduate of the UCLA School of Theater, Film and, Television and the first Black American to serve as a producer on a major motion picture.

Jones was relatively unknown outside of the film industry until 1970, when he publicly announced that he had been secretly married to actress Inger Stevens from 1961 until her death in April 1970. Jones's claim was backed up in court by Stevens' brother, Carl O. Stensland.

== Early life and education ==
Jones was born in Santa Monica, California, and attended Santa Monica High School.

He studied motion picture production at the UCLA School of Theater, Film and Television. While at UCLA, he also played end for the Bruins and was named to the 1952 All-Pacific Coast Conference team. After graduating from UCLA, Jones was drafted 295th overall in the 25th round by the Green Bay Packers in the 1953 NFL draft, but declined the offer.

== Career ==
In 1953, Jones worked as an actor in bit parts and served as an assistant director on The Joe Louis Story. Later on in the decade, Jones worked as an assistant producer for Hill-Hecht Lancaster Company. After that production company folded, Harry Belafonte hired him as vice president of development for Harbel Productions. In the 1960s, Jones headed Nat King Cole's Kell-Cole Productions. After the singer's death, Jones was hired as a producer on A Man Called Adam, a film starring Sammy Davis Jr. This was the first time that an African American was hired as a producer on a major motion picture.

== Personal life ==
On November 18, 1961, Jones and actress Inger Stevens were married in Tijuana, Mexico. At Jones' suggestion, Stevens agreed to keep their union a secret, to protect their show business careers. The demands of their careers meant that they spent much time apart, straining their marriage and they eventually separated. In April 1970, while the couple were estranged and living apart, Stevens died of a barbiturate overdose that was eventually ruled a suicide. Stevens did not leave a will and Jones filed to become administrator of her estate, making their marriage public. Despite Jones being unable to produce a valid marriage license, Superior Court Commissioner A. Edward Nichols ruled in his favor and appointed him administrator of her estate in August 1970. Her brother Carl O. Stensland confirmed to the court that Stevens had hidden her marriage to Jones "out of fear for her career." Jones announced that he would use a portion of Stevens' $171,000 estate to open a mental health care clinic in her name in Watts, Los Angeles, but that never happened. At the time, Jones managed a chain of convalescent homes.

Around that same time, Jones had made a number of bad investments, straining his finances.

== Later years and death ==
In 1995, he became the first recipient of the Oscar Micheaux Award, presented by the Producers Guild of America.

Jones died "of complications from a stroke and congestive heart failure" in an assisted-living facility in Los Angeles on October 5, 2014. He was 84.

== Legacy ==
A street called Ike Jones Road near John Wayne Airport in Santa Ana, California, is named for Ike Jones.
