= Man on Fire (1957 film) =

1957 film by Ranald MacDougall

- Directed by: Ranald MacDougall
- Screenplay by: Ranald MacDougall
- Based on: Man on Fire; 1956 teleplay by Malvin Wald; Jack Jacobs
- Produced by: Sol C. Siegel
- Starring: Bing Crosby; Inger Stevens
- Cinematography: Joseph Ruttenberg
- Edited by: Ralph E. Winters
- Music by: David Raksin
- Distributed by: MGM
- Release date: July 5, 1957
- Running time: 95 minutes
- Country: United States
- Language: English
- Budget: $1,180,000
- Box office: $1,415,000

Man on Fire is a 1957 American drama film directed by Ranald MacDougall and starring Bing Crosby in a rare non-singing, unsympathetic role.

== Plot ==
Two years after her divorce from wealthy industrialist Earl Carleton, ex-wife Gwen wants to regain partial custody of their son, Ted, who is devoted to his father. Earl has never gotten over losing her after introducing her to the man she left him for.

Gwen's new husband Bryan Seward is a sharp attorney who works for the State Department. Using his skill and pull, he gets the custody hearing from the divorce re-opened, stating she signed the custody agreement under emotional duress.

Meeting with them before the hearing, Earl intimates that he will do all he can to harm Seward's career if they try to get the child back. As Earl's personal and business lawyer Sam Dunstock prepares to handle the hearing, Earl seems unaware of the personal interest in him from Sam's new assistant, Nina Wylie.

The boy tells Judge Rudolph in private that he prefers living with his dad and is suspicious of his mother's motives. Disturbed that he has not developed an appreciation for or ties with his mother, the judge awards Gwen full rather than partial custody. An alcoholic binge follows for Earl, who is shattered.

Nina comes to inform him that business matters are suffering from his neglect. She takes care of Earl when he drunkenly passes out, after he claimed that he never loved Gwen and only married her so a son could take over his business someday.

Ted comes over to Earl's to express his unhappiness with the situation. Earl, his business shut down, impulsively gives Sam power of attorney and decides to go to Europe "for some peace of mind." Nina realizes that Earl is planning to take Ted with him, where they will be out of the reach of the court, and warns Sam to call Seward.

Seward arrives in time to take the child off the plane, resulting in a fight between the men. Sam is disgusted with Earl's self-pitying and selfish behavior, and when Nina confesses to being in love with him, Earl cruelly says girls like her are "a dime a dozen." She hands him a dime.

Gwen reveals to Nina that she wanted Ted back because she and Seward are unable to have a child of their own. Her guilt grows at discovering how unhappy she has made her son and tries to return him to Earl. Earl is forced to realize how much she loves Ted and convinces Ted that the change of custody is best for all of them. Earl starts anew with Nina, handing her back the dime.

== Cast ==
- Bing Crosby as Earl Carleton
- Inger Stevens as Nina Wylie
- Mary Fickett as Gwen Seward
- E.G. Marshall as Sam Dunstock
- Malcolm Brodrick as Ted Carleton
- Richard Eastham as Bryan Seward
- Anne Seymour as Judge Rudolph
- Dan Riss as Mack

== Reception ==
Bosley Crowther of The New York Times said, inter alia; "Bing Crosby has bravely undertaken a difficult and unattractive role in “Man on Fire,” a non-musical drama, which came to Loew’s State yesterday. It is that of a stubborn, self-pitying father who tries to monopolize his young son and prevent him from spending time with his mother, from whom the father is divorced...this is an honest, sensitive effort to show the grief that may come from a broken home and from the obstinacy of a divorced parent who doesn’t want to share the love of a severed child. It is a worthwhile and often sad exposure of what may happen to the emotions of parents and child when one parent acts immaturely. It hits a problem that can profitably be shown."

Variety commented: "Bing Crosby, who made an impact as the alcoholic actor in The Country Girl, again demonstrates his ability as a straight dramatic performer. As a doting father embroiled in a harsh custody battle with his ex-wife, he gives an appealing and sensitive performance. . . Since this type of fiction has a ready-made distaff audience, indications are that Man on Fire should be particularly appealing to women."

According to MGM records, the film earned $1.1 million in the U.S. and Canada and $315,000 elsewhere, resulting in a loss of $542,000.

== Novelization ==
In anticipation of the film's release, Avon Books published a paperback novelization of the screenplay. The byline "Owen Aherne" was a pseudonym for renowned American novelist R.V. Cassill.

== Soundtrack ==
- "Man on Fire" (Sammy Fain / Paul Francis Webster) sung by Bing Crosby over the opening credits, and later in the film by the Ames Brothers.

== See also ==
- List of American films of 1957
