= Death Race (1973 film) =

- Genre: Action; Drama; War
- Written by: Charles Kuenstle
- Directed by: David Lowell Rich
- Starring: Lloyd Bridges; Roy Thinnes; Eric Braeden; Doug McClure
- Country of origin: United States
- Original language: English

Production
- Producers: Harve Bennett; Terry K. Meade
- Cinematography: Terry K. Meade
- Editors: Les Green; Carl Pingitore
- Running time: 90 minutes
- Production companies: Silverton Productions; Universal Television
- Budget: $650,000 (estimated)

Original release
- Network: ABC
- Release: November 10, 1973

Death Race is a 1973 American TV movie, originally broadcast as an ABC Movie of the Week.

== Plot ==
In November 1942, in the African desert, two Allied pilots in separate planes are sent to blow up a minefield. They come across a small German column, and attack it. A tank captained by an officer shoots down one of the Allied planes forcing the pilot, McMillan, to bail out. The other pilot, Culpepper, lands to rescue him as the tank closes in. Culpepper's plane is damaged, and can only taxi. A deadly pursuit ensues.

== Cast ==
- Lloyd Bridges as General Ernst Beimler
- Roy Thinnes as Arnold McMillan
- Eric Braeden as Stoeffer
- Doug McClure as Lieutenant Del Culpepper
- Brendon Boone as Private Huffman
- Christopher Cary as British Radioman
- Dennis Rucker as Lieutenant Voelke
- Dennis Dugan as Private Becker
- Ivor Barry as Major Waverly
- William Beckley as British Airman
- Eric Micklewood as British Officer

== Reception ==
In the Los Angeles Times, Kevin Thomas labeled it "a good suspense drama" which "is scarcely original enough to be anywhere near profound, but it does make its point emphatically in a way that's entertaining, especially for action fans".
