= Firecreek =

1968 western film by Vincent McEveety

- Theatrical release poster
- Directed by: Vincent McEveety
- Written by: Calvin Clements Sr.
- Produced by: Philip Leacock; John Mantley
- Starring: James Stewart; Henry Fonda; Gary Lockwood; Dean Jagger; Ed Begley; Jay C. Flippen; Inger Stevens
- Cinematography: William H. Clothier
- Edited by: William H. Ziegler
- Music by: Alfred Newman
- Production companies: Philip Leacock Productions; John Mantley Productions
- Distributed by: Warner Bros.-Seven Arts
- Release date: January 24, 1968
- Running time: 104 minutes
- Country: United States
- Language: English
- Box office: $1,100,000 (US/ Canada)

Firecreek is a 1968 American Western film directed by Vincent McEveety and starring James Stewart and Henry Fonda, the latter in his first of two roles that year as a villain (the second being Sergio Leone's Once Upon a Time in the West). The film is similar to High Noon in that it features an entire town that refuses to help a peace officer against outlaws. Stewart plays an unlikely hero, forced into action when his conscience will not permit evil to continue. The supporting cast features Inger Stevens, Dean Jagger, Ed Begley, Jay C. Flippen, Jack Elam and John Qualen.

Offscreen close friends Stewart and Fonda's first film together had been in a section of the episodic musical comedy On Our Merry Way two decades earlier, in which they played two musicians named "Slim" and "Lank", and they would make The Cheyenne Social Club two years after Firecreek. They had also both appeared in How the West Was Won but had no scenes together despite their characters in the film being depicted as best friends.

Firecreek was partially filmed at North Ranch in Oak Park, California, and Thousand Oaks, California.

== Plot ==
After years of backing away from criminals and gunfights, one resident of the small western town of Firecreek decides to fight back. Part-time sheriff Johnny Cobb decides to avenge the death of a young man against gunmen led by Bob Larkin.

Cobb has a lot on his mind, particularly with his wife Henrietta about to give birth. He is a peace-loving farmer whose childishly made sheriff's badge is practically an honorary one.

Larkin's men ride into town and disrupt the peace. Earl, Norman and Drew run roughshod over the local citizens and Larkin has no inclination to stop it, despite Cobb's requests. Larkin is more interested in getting to know an attractive widow named Evelyn.

The only person in town willing to help Cobb is a slow-witted stable boy named Arthur. When one of Larkin's men attacks a woman, Arthur kills the man.

Cobb's wife goes into labor and he has to leave town. While he is gone, Larkin's men hang Arthur and no one in the town tries to stop them.

Cobb returns to town to discover that Arthur has been hanged in the stable. He lowers the body, then demands that the apathetic shopkeeper eyewitness, Whittier, hand over his own gun. Cobb then goes after Larkin and his men, one of whom gets caught in a rope tied to his horse, which bolts off, dragging him. Cobb manages to kill the last two men in individual struggles, and then faces off against Larkin in the middle of the main street; Larkin easily outshoots Cobb and gives him the option of living if he stops his vendetta, but Cobb refuses to quit, Larkin prepares to kill Cobb but is shot with a rifle by the widow Evelyn from a 2nd-story window, as he is about to shoot Cobb.

== Cast ==
- James Stewart as Johnny Cobb
- Henry Fonda as Bob Larkin
- Inger Stevens as Evelyn Pittman
- Jacqueline Scott as Henrietta Cobb
- Gary Lockwood as Earl
- Dean Jagger as Whittier
- Ed Begley as Preacher Broyles
- Jay C. Flippen as Mr. Pittman
- Jack Elam as Norman
- James Best as Drew
- BarBara Luna as Meli
- Brooke Bundy as Leah
- J. Robert Porter as Arthur
- Morgan Woodward as Willard
- John Qualen as Hall
- Louise Latham as Dulcie
- Athena Lorde as Mrs. Littlejohn

== Critical reaction ==
Contemporary critical reaction to Firecreek was generally positive. Howard Thompson of The New York Times called it "a good, sturdy and occasionally powerful little Western", especially praising screenwriter Calvin Clements but claiming, "James Stewart is plain wonderful and Henry Fonda almost matches him." Roger Ebert of the Chicago Sun Times gave Firecreek three stars. However, despite the rating and praise for actors James Stewart, Jacqueline Scott, Henry Fonda and Inger Stevens, Ebert felt that "somehow the parts don't quite come together" and "things move at too leisurely a pace".

== See also ==
- List of American films of 1968
