= Inger Stevens =

Swedish and American actress (1934–1970)

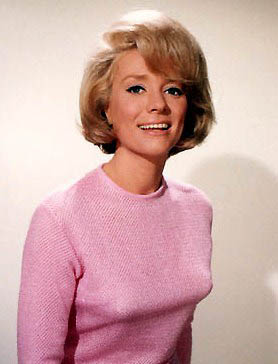
- Stevens in 1967
- Born: Ingrid Stensland; October 18, 1934; Stockholm, Sweden
- Died: April 30, 1970 (aged 35); Los Angeles, California, U.S.
- Resting place: Cremated, ashes scattered at sea
- Occupation: Actress
- Years active: 1954-1970
- Spouses: Anthony Soglio (m. 1955; div. 1958) Ike Jones (m. 1961)
- Awards: Best TV Star (TV Guide) – Female; 1964 The Farmer's Daughter

Inger Stevens (born Ingrid Stensland; October 18, 1934 – April 30, 1970) was a Swedish-born American film, stage, and Golden Globe-winning television actress.

== Early life ==
Stevens was born in Stockholm, Sweden, the eldest child of Per Gustaf and Lisbet Stensland. When she was age 6, her mother abandoned the family, taking her younger son Peter with her. Stevens's father then moved to the United States, leaving Stevens and her brother Ola in the custody of the family maid and then later with an aunt in Lidingö, an island near Stockholm. In 1944, Stevens and her brother moved to the United States and lived with their father and his new American wife in New York City, where her father was completing his PhD in education at Columbia University. At age 13, Stevens moved with her family to Manhattan, Kansas, where her father taught at Kansas State University. Stevens attended Manhattan High School.

At 15, Stevens moved to Kansas City, where she worked in burlesque shows. At 18, she returned to New York City, where she worked as a chorus girl and in the Garment District while taking classes at the Actors Studio.

== Career ==
Stevens appeared on television series, in commercials, and in plays until she received her big break in the film Man on Fire (1957), starring Bing Crosby.

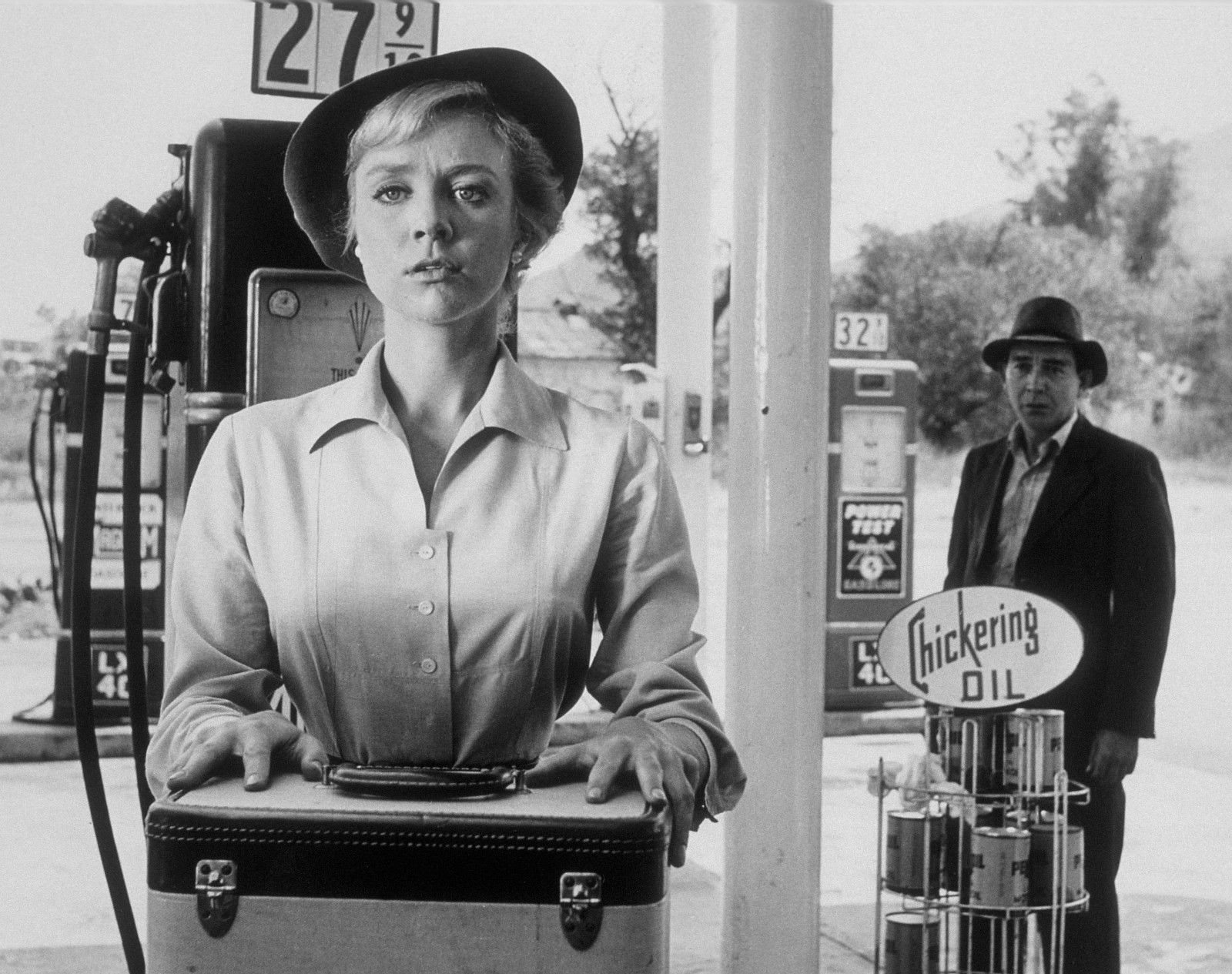
Stevens in The Twilight Zone episode "The Hitch-Hiker" (1960)

Starring roles in major films followed, including opposite James Mason and Rod Steiger in Cry Terror! (1958) and opposite Harry Belafonte in 1959's The World, the Flesh and the Devil, but she achieved her greatest success in the television series The Farmer's Daughter (1963-1966) with William Windom. Previously, Stevens had appeared in episodes of Bonanza, Route 66, The Alfred Hitchcock Hour, The Eleventh Hour, Dick Powell's Zane Grey Theatre, Sam Benedict, The Aquanauts, and The Twilight Zone.

Following the cancellation of The Farmer's Daughter in 1966, Stevens appeared in several high-profile films in quick succession, including A Guide for the Married Man (1967), Firecreek, Hang 'Em High, 5 Card Stud, and Madigan (all released in 1968). Her final theatrical film was A Dream of Kings (1969). Her final project was the television film Run, Simon, Run (1970). At the time of her death, Stevens was attempting to revive her television career with the detective drama series The Most Deadly Game.

== Personal life ==
Stevens's first husband was her agent Anthony Soglio, to whom she was married from 1955 to 1957. Her aunt was Karin Stensland Junker, author of The Child in the Glass Ball.

In January 1966, she was appointed to the advisory board of the UCLA Neuropsychiatric Institute by California governor Edmund G. "Pat" Brown. She also was named chairman of the California Council for Retarded Children.

After Stevens's death, Ike Jones, the first black graduate of UCLA's School of Theater, Film, and Television, alleged that he had secretly married Stevens in Mexico in 1961. Some doubted Jones's claim because of the lack of a marriage license, the maintenance of separate homes, and the filing of tax documents as single people. However, when Stevens' estate was being settled, her brother, Carl O. Stensland, confirmed in court that Stevens had hidden her marriage to Jones "out of fear for her career." Los Angeles Superior Court Commissioner A. Edward Nichols ruled in Jones's favor and named him administrator of her estate. A photograph exists of the two attending a banquet together in 1968.

== Death ==
On the morning of April 30, 1970, Stevens's roommate and companion Lola McNally found Stevens on the kitchen floor of her Hollywood Hills home. According to McNally, Stevens opened her eyes, lifted her head, and tried to speak, but was unable to utter any sound. McNally told police that she had spoken to Stevens the previous night and had seen no signs of trouble. Stevens died in the ambulance on the way to the hospital. On arrival, medics removed a small bandage from her chin that revealed a small amount of fresh blood oozing from a cut that appeared to have been a few hours old. Los Angeles County coroner Dr. Thomas Noguchi attributed Stevens's death to "acute barbiturate poisoning", and the death eventually was ruled a suicide.

== Filmography ==
=== Film ===
- Man on Fire (1957) — Nina Wylie
- Cry Terror! (1958) — Mrs. Joan Molner
- The Buccaneer (1958) — Annette Claiborne
- The World, the Flesh and the Devil (1959) — Sarah Crandall
- The New Interns (1964) — Nancy Terman
- The Borgia Stick (1967, TV) — Eve Harrison
- A Guide for the Married Man (1967) — Ruth Manning
- A Time for Killing (1967) — Emily Biddle
- Firecreek (1968) — Evelyn Pittman
- Madigan (1968) — Julia Madigan
- 5 Card Stud (1968) — Lily Langford
- Hang 'Em High (1968) — Rachel Warren
- House of Cards (1968) — Anne de Villemont
- A Dream of Kings (1969) — Anna
- Run, Simon, Run (1970, ABC Movie of the Week) — Carroll Rennard

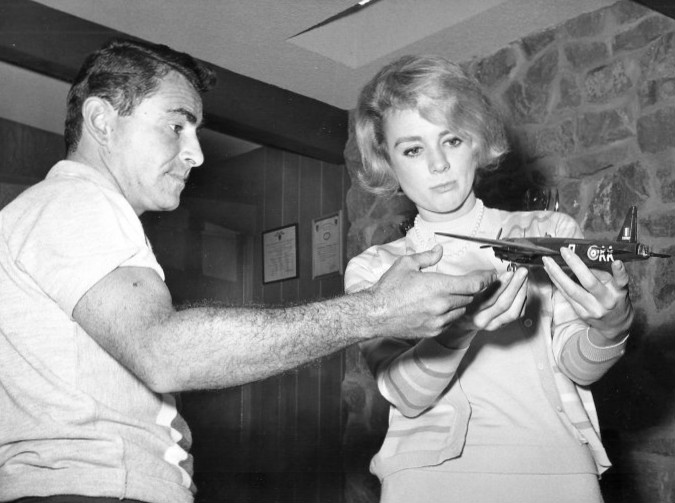
Stevens appeared in two episodes of Rod Serling's The Twilight Zone (image at his home in 1960).

=== Television ===
- Kraft Television Theatre (1 episode, 1954)
- Robert Montgomery Presents (1 episode, 1955)
- Studio One (3 episodes, 1954-1955) — Lucy Henderson / Mary / Sue Ellen
- Crunch and Des (1 episode, 1956) — The Actress
- Matinee Theatre (1 episode, 1956)
- Crusader as Alicia in "The Girl Across the Hall" (CBS, 1956) — Alicia
- Conflict (1 episode, 1956) — Lady Arabella
- The Joseph Cotten Show, or On Trial (1 episode, "Law Is for the Lovers", 1956) — Ruth
- The Millionaire (1 episode, 1956) — Betty Perkins
- Alfred Hitchcock Presents (Season 2 Episode 17: "My Brother, Richard") (1957) — Laura Ross
- Climax! (1 episode, 1957) — Marge
- Playhouse 90 (2 episodes, 1956-1959) — Gail Lucas / Johanna — Chambermaid
- Bonanza (1 episode, 1959) — Emily Pennington
- Sunday Showcase (1 episode, 1959) — Nina Kay
- Dick Powell's Zane Grey Theatre (1 episode, 1960) — Beth Watkins
- Moment of Fear (1 episode, 1960)
- Checkmate (1 episode, 1960) — Betty Lyons
- Hong Kong (1 episode, 1960) — Joan Blakely
- The Twilight Zone
  - In "The Hitch-Hiker" Season 1 Episode 16 (CBS, 1960) — Nan Adams
  - In "The Lateness of the Hour", Season 2 Episode 8 (CBS, 1960) — Jana
- Route 66 (2 episodes, 1960–1961) — Julie Brack / Wendy Durant
- The DuPont Show of the Month (1 episode, 1961) — Princess Flavia
- Adventures in Paradise (1 episode, 1961) — Dr. Britta Sjostrom
- The Aquanauts (1 episode, 1961) — Margot Allison
- The Detectives (1 episode, 1961) — Thea Templeton
- Follow the Sun (2 episodes, 1961) — Lisa Mannheim / Abby Ellis
- The Eleventh Hour (1 episode, 1962) — Christine Warren
- Sam Benedict (1 episode, 1962) — Theresa Stone
- The Dick Powell Show (2 episodes, 1962-1963) — Adele Hughes / Anna Beza
- Your First Impression (1963) — herself
- The Alfred Hitchcock Hour (1963, Season 1 Episode 17: "Forecast: Low Clouds and Coastal Fog") — Karen Wilson
- The Nurses (1 episode, 1963) — Clarissa Robin
- Empire (1 episode, 1963) — Ellen Thompson
- The Farmer's Daughter (101 episodes, 1963-1966) — Katy Holstrum / Katy Morley / Ann Carpenter
- Get Smart (1 Episode, 1965) — Princess Ingrid of Scandinavia
- The Danny Kaye Show (1 episode, 1966) — herself
- The Smothers Brothers Comedy Hour (1 episode, 1967) — Eve Harrison
- The Mask of Sheba (1970) — Sarah Kramer
- Run, Simon, Run (1970) — Carroll Rennard
- The Most Deadly Game (1 episode, 1970) — Vanessa Smith

== Broadway credits ==
- Debut (1956)
- Roman Candle (1960)
- Mary, Mary (1962)

== Awards and nominations ==
Year	Result	Award	Category	Series
1958	Nominated	Laurel Awards	Top New Female Personality	—
1968	Nominated	Laurel Awards	Best Female Comedy Performance	A Guide for the Married Man
1963	Won	Golden Globe	Best TV Star – Female	The Farmer's Daughter
1962	Nominated	Emmy Award	Outstanding Single Performance by an Actress in a Leading Role	The Dick Powell Show
1964	Nominated	Emmy Award	Outstanding Continued Performance by an Actress in a Series (Lead)	The Farmer's Daughter
