= Miami Love Affair =

2017 film directed by Ralph Kinnard

- Directed by: Ralph Kinnard
- Written by: Ralph Kinnard
- Produced by: Lance Paul
- Starring: Burt Reynolds
- Cinematography: Ivan Oms Blanco
- Edited by: Diego Montealegre
- Music by: Christian Cooley
- Production company: Ginger Knight Entertainment
- Release date: October 10, 2017 (Calcutta International Cult Film Festival)
- Running time: 90 minutes
- Country: United States
- Language: English

Miami Love Affair is a 2017 American romantic comedy film written and directed by Ralph Kinnard and starring Burt Reynolds in one of his final film roles.

== Plot ==
It is about several love affairs at an international art fair in Miami. Lucia, an artist from Latin America, meets Benedict. Victor, a writer travels to Miami with his girlfriend Ana. While Ana is more in love with money and her job, Victor then spends time with Nina. Theo, Nina's boyfriend, woes a rich old lady to commission hundreds of paintings from him, but the rich old lady wants something in return.

== Cast ==
- Burt Reynolds as Robert
- Mónica Pasqualotto as Lucia
- Ralph Kinnard as Benedict
- Anisbel Lopez as Nina
- Alan Klinger as Victor
- Rusbeh Bani as Theo
- Ana Lucia Chaverria as Anna
