= Run, Simon, Run =

1970 film directed by George McCowan

- Title card
- Written by: Lionel E. Siegel
- Directed by: George McCowan
- Starring: Burt Reynolds; Inger Stevens; Royal Dano
- Music by: The Orphanage
- Country of origin: United States
- Original language: English

Production
- Producer: Aaron Spelling
- Cinematography: Arch R. Dalzell
- Editor: Art Seid
- Running time: 74 minutes
- Production company: Aaron Spelling Productions

Original release
- Network: ABC
- Release: December 1, 1970

Run, Simon, Run (also known as The Tradition of Simon Zuniga) is a 1970 American made-for-television thriller film from Aaron Spelling starring Burt Reynolds.

It featured the last performance of Inger Stevens.

== Plot ==
Simon Zuniga, a Papago man, is struck by Carroll Rennard's car while he is running down the road after being released from prison. She drives him to the reservation, where she also works. There as he sleeps on his brother's grave, he dreams about the night that his brother was shot by Henry Burroughs and how Henry framed him for the murder.
Simon is informed that he is to take over as head of the tribal council. When girls are brought out at a public event to perform a "Dance of the 20 Virgins", Simon leads a protest by standing and covering his eyes, causing the girls to leave in embarrassment.
Simon later overhears Santana mention Burroughs and learns that Henry is still alive. Now free and stronger than ever, Simon seeks revenge on Henry by breaking into his old home but only finds new renters. He is arrested and Carroll pays his bail. She drives him to Tucson and hires Cesar Rosetti, a private detective.
Simon and Carroll become romantically involved and she holds a party for him to meet her friends. They ask him to do a rain dance but he says that he doesn't need rain. Carroll confesses to a friend that she is pregnant with Simon's child.
Rosetti tells Simon that Burroughs moved around from Albuquerque to Phoenix but is now living under the name Henry Bagley and is currently fishing nearby. Simon finds the house then waits until dark and sneaks inside. He ties up Henry and carries him outside then waits for sunrise. He cuts Henry loose and says that he will kill Henry with the dagger he places in the ground. Henry grabs the knife first and after a battle Simon gets the knife and stabs Henry in the stomach but is then shot by the other men from the house. Carroll makes her way to a road and convinces a bus reserved for the tribe to take her back to the reservation with them.

== Cast ==
- Burt Reynolds as Simon Zuniga
- Inger Stevens as Carroll Rennard
- Royal Dano as Sheriff Tacksberry
- James Best as Henry Burroughs
- Rodolfo Acosta as Manuel
- Don Dubbins as Freddie Tomb
- Joyce Jameson as Esther
- Barney Phillips as Cesar Rosetti
- Herman Rudin as Asa
- Eddie Little Sky as Santana
- Ken Lynch as Warden Lomis
- Rosemary Eliot as Marilyn
- Marsha Moode as Helen Polino
- Martin G. Soto as Ignacio

== Production ==
Reynolds starring role in Run, Simon, Run followed another TV movie, Hunters Are for Killing (1970).

It was shot in Tucson in February and March 1970.

== Reception ==
It was the fifth highest-rated program of the week.

In his obituary for Reynolds in Film Ireland, movie critic Wayne Byrne mentions the film:

In Run Simon Run ... Reynolds plays an ostracised ex-con Native American who falls in love with a rich, charitable social worker played by Inger Stevens. It was another culture clash romance; a good film with important themes at its heart, but one which failed to ignite much interest from audiences and critics.
