= Auctores octo morales =

Medieval collection of Latin textbooks

The Auctores octo morales (Eight Moral Authors) was a collection of Latin textbooks, of an elementary standard, that was used for pedagogy in the Middle Ages in Europe. It was printed in many editions, from the end of the fifteenth century. At that time it became standardised as:

1. Distichs of Cato
2. Eclogue of Theodulus
3. Facetus: Liber Faceti docens mores iuvenum (Also believed to be by Cato of the Distichs)
4. De contemptu mundi
5. Liber Floretus
6. Matthew of Vendôme, Tobias
7. Alan of Lille, Doctrinale altum parabolarum
8. Aesop, version attributed to Gualterus Anglicus (online text).
