= Hunters Are for Killing =

Made for TV film

- Written by: Charles Kuenstle
- Directed by: Bernard Girard
- Starring: Burt Reynolds
- Music by: Jerry Fielding
- Country of origin: United States
- Original language: English

Production
- Running time: 100 minutes
- Production company: Cinema Center 100

Original release
- Network: CBS
- Release: 12 March 1970

Hunters Are for Killing is a 1970 American TV movie starring Burt Reynolds, Melvyn Douglas and Suzanne Pleshette. The film was originally titled The Return.

== Plot ==
A man comes home from prison to claim his share of his deceased mother's estate.

== Production ==
Reynolds at the time played many Native American roles. There was a Native American aspect to the script for this film but he asked for it to be removed. "There was already so much going for them in the script they didn't need an Indian angle too", he said. Following this film, Reynolds would star in another television movie, Run, Simon, Run (1970), of which the lead character in that film, played by Reynolds, was a Native American.

The syndication title of the film is Hard Frame.

It was filmed around the Wine Country in Santa Rosa, California in January 1970.
