= Alain Maiki =

Venezuelan-American director and producer

Alain Maiki (born March 29, 1977) is a Venezuelan-American director and producer. Maiki, a former music producer and composer, began his film career in 2009, with a fast-paced success in the independent film industry.

Maiki has been emerging as a filmmaker-producer with his first short film titled Harmony, followed by his debut feature film "Devuélveme La Vida" released in Venezuela in January 2016 and earning a noticeable success among a few international film festivals. Followed by his debut feature, he now has finished his second feature titled UMA a drama/love story shot in Italy and currently under post-production that will be released in 2017 in at least three countries and two continents. In addition, Maiki is gaining interest for future feature film production for 2017 and 2018.
