= Mara de Oro Awards =

Arts and entertainment awards of Venezuela

Mara de Oro awards
- Awarded for: Excellence in art and shows, sports, culture, media, entrepreneurship, scientific, professional and business contributions
- Country: Venezuela
- Presented by: Mara de Oro of Venezuela Foundation
- First award: September 13, 1955; 71 years ago
- Website: maradeoro.com.ve

The Mara de Oro Awards (Premios Mara de Oro) are a gala organized by the Fundación Mara de Oro de Venezuela e Internacional. They are the oldest awards in Venezuela in terms of arts and entertainment. With its slogan, "rewarding the best of the best", in each installment the categories evaluated by expert personnel in the area have increased, covering literature, medicine, social sciences, politics, among other guilds.

Its main headquarters is the Zulia state (Venezuela) from 1955 to the present, with a correspondent in the center and east of the country for some special editions. Recently, it debuted outside of Venezuela with its international edition.

== History ==
Created on October 10, 1955 by the Zulian journalist Guillermo Sánchez García, the Mara de Oro maintains the purpose of promoting the work of men and women nationally and internationally. The Mara de Oro Awards, in turn, is one of the pioneering awards in recognizing the Gaita Zuliana, an autochthonous musical genre of the region.

For decades, the award was proclaimed through RCTV screens, by the same founder. After the death of Sánchez García on December 2, 1988, in honor of his memory, the award was in the hands of Hender González, who maintained the essence and legacy for more than 4 decades of intense work, enjoying the certification and international credibility.

After the unexpected departure of Hender González, the award continues its functions under the direction of the lawyer Emelina Carrasquero Montes, historically being the first woman from Zulia to assume the presidency of the precious award.

As part of the celebration of its 64th anniversary, in 2019 it announced the Special Multi-Destination Edition for the cities of Bogotá, Miami and Venezuela, scheduled for the months of November and December of that year.

== Headquarters ==
The Mara de Oro de Venezuela and International Foundation maintains its headquarters in Zulia State (Venezuela) from 1955 to the present, holding special editions in Margarita.

== Categories ==
The Mara de Oro de Venezuela and International Foundation has a fairly broad corporate purpose that has allowed it to recognize the work of different personalities from art, entertainment, media, professional and business associations over the years, for which the categories They vary each edition, maintaining a diversity of opportunities for all areas, all endorsed by a group of experts for a specific area.

Among other special categories are those of the Gaitaa zuliana, such as Gaitero of the Year, Composer of the Year, Soloist of the Year and Announcer of the Year, while the musical career as Soloist, Composer, Cuatrista, Charrasquero, Furrero and Tamborero is recognized.

== Distinctions ==
The Foundation has a board of directors that endorses and supports the following distinctions:

- Golden Mara (Mara de Oro)
- Platinum Mara (Mara de Platino)
- Diamond Mara (Mara de Diamante)

All these distinctions are awarded for the years of experience, scientific, cultural, sports, communicational and artistic contribution of each of the postulates. With exceptions of highest distinction:

- Double Diamond Mara (Mara Doble Diamante)
- Mara Triple Diamond (Mara Triple Diamante)
- Ultimate Mara (Mara de Maras)

== Logo ==
In recent years, based on the identity of the organization, different logos have been handled, which have as their main focus the isotype of the Indian Mara, accompanied by the word Mara de Oro, sometimes the year of the anniversary.

== Controversy ==
In 2006, the Caracas-based Mara Internacional Awards were created, which has generated confusion for the media when writing their notes, including copyright legal problems by associating a gala of more than 60 years with one that barely would be 20 years old. Likewise, in 2019 an influencer denounced these new awards that, using the story of the Mara de Oro, caused confusion in the artist who would be awarded.
