= Temptation =

Desire to engage in short-term urges for enjoyment that threatens long-term goals

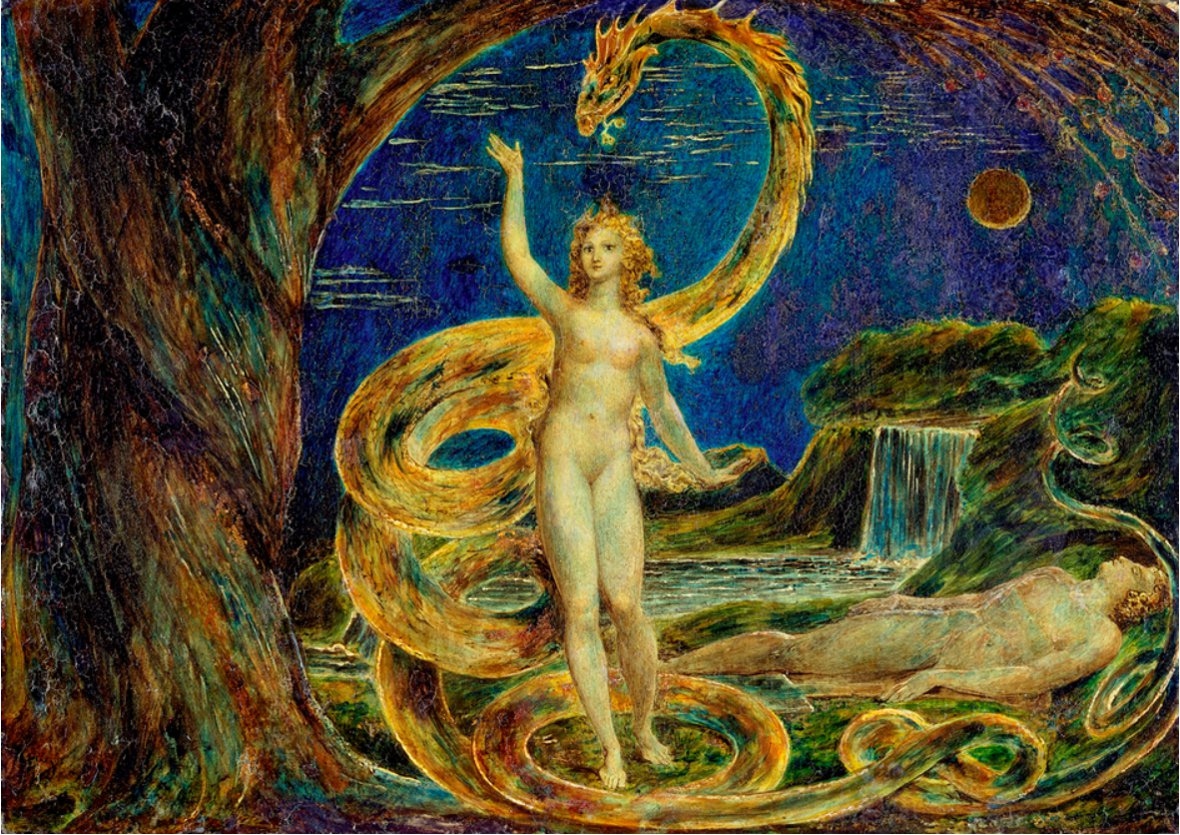
Eve Tempted by the Serpent by William Blake, 1799-1800 (painted)

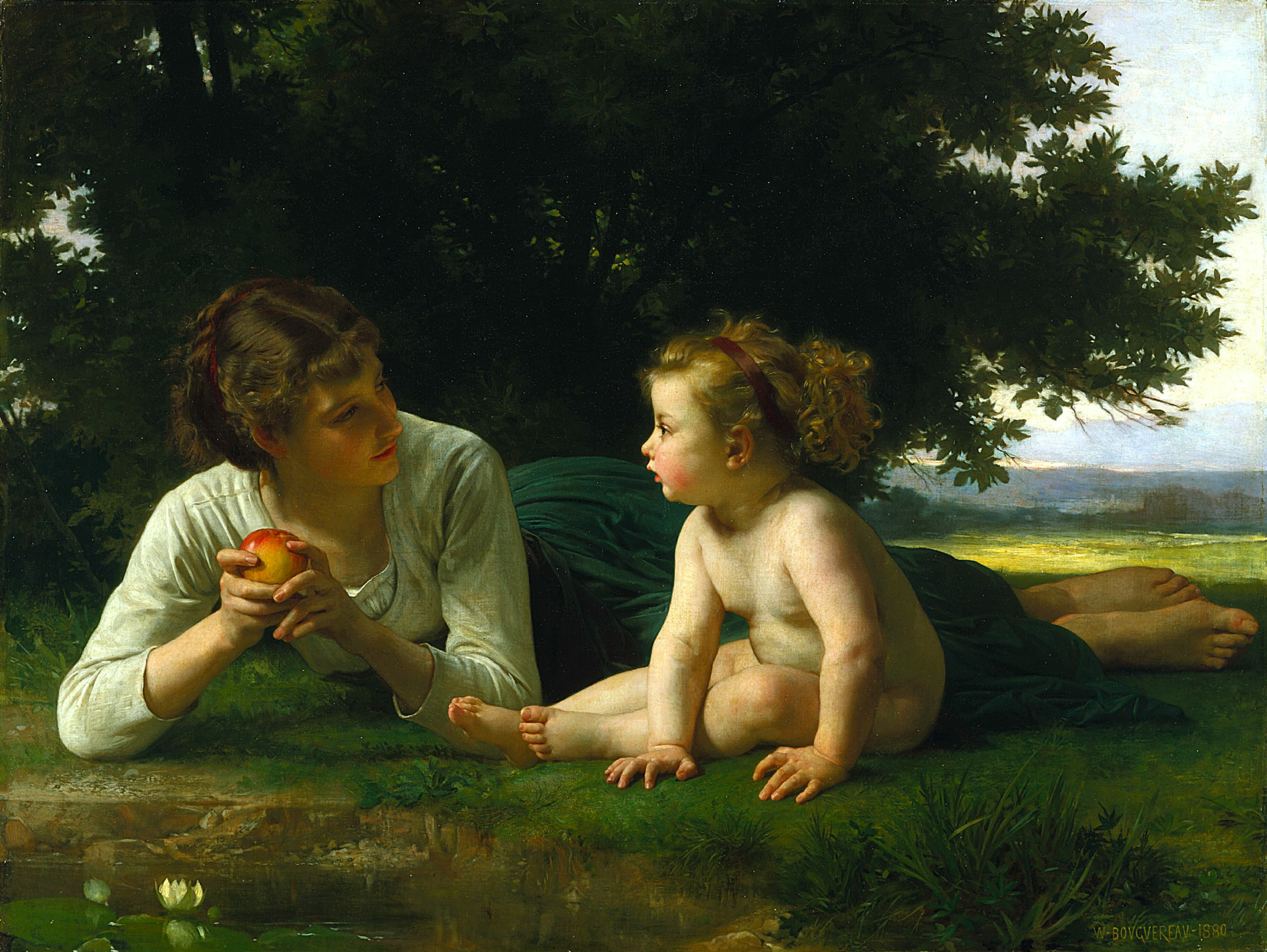
Temptation, by William-Adolphe Bouguereau.

Temptation is a desire to engage in short-term urges for enjoyment that threatens long-term goals. In the context of some religions, temptation is the inclination to sin. Temptation also describes the coaxing or inducing a person into committing such an act, by manipulation or otherwise of curiosity, desire or fear of loss something important to a person.

In the context of self-control and ego depletion, temptation is described as an immediate, pleasurable urge and/or impulse that disrupts an individual's ability to wait for the long-term goals, in which that individual hopes to attain.

More informally, temptation may be used to mean "the state of being attracted and enticed" without anything to do with moral, ethical, or ideological valuation; for example, one may say that a piece of food looks "tempting" even though eating it would result in no negative consequences.

Research suggests that there are paradoxical effects associated with temptation. Implicit in all the forms in which temptation can present itself there is a set of options that may facilitate high moral standards in decision-making.

- Weak or subtle temptations, in comparison to strong or obvious temptations, can lead to a greater loss of self-control.
- supported research states that "available temptations are less valuable and less tempting".

Temptations can have effects on long-term goal attainment, it has been found that individuals who experienced temptation and the effects of it found there were benefits to their experiences.

== Religious usage ==
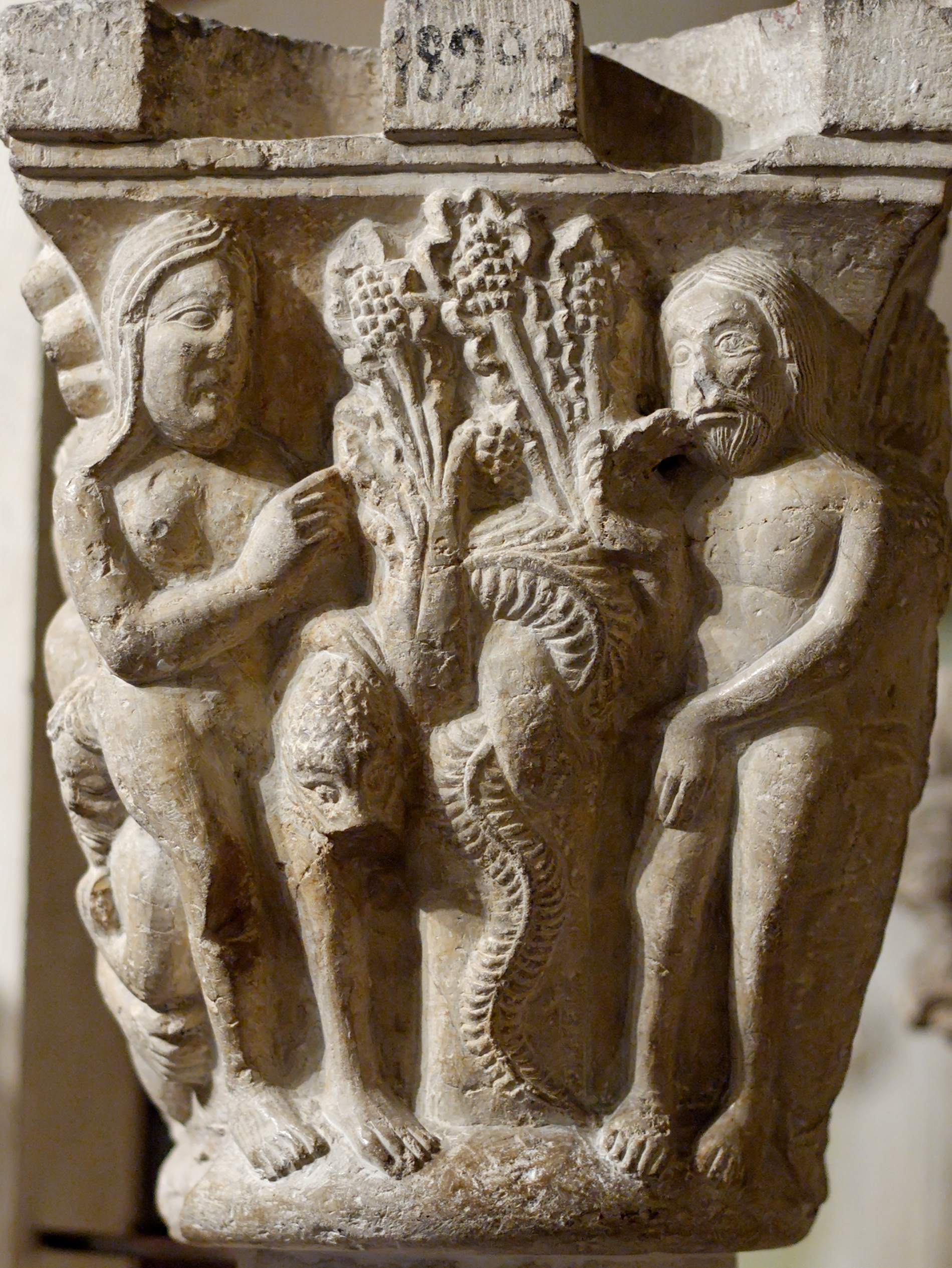
Capital representing scenes from the Book of Genesis: temptation of Adam and Eve, Musée de Cluny.

A research article was written by Vanchai Ariyabuddhiphongs, a professor at Bangkok University, about the motivational and persuasive negative effects of such temptations such as money, that can push one to disregard religious beliefs whether it be Buddhism, Christianity etc. He says that when given an opportunity at a large amount of money we have a greater chance of harming, stealing, partaking in sexual misconduct, or abusing substances. This idea of money as a negative persuasion tactic in regards to the religions mentioned above, is psychologically proven to affect our cognitive ability to make decisions. Vanchai's article talked solely on Buddhist practices but it is believed that it could be broadened to all beliefs. Religious beliefs may define people, but this article described how an outside source can push those thoughts away and look to benefit us in a way that may include disregarding religion.

Jesus, in the prayer he taught his disciples, urged believers to pray for freedom from temptation.

In the Eastern Orthodox Christian tradition, temptation is broken down into 6 distinct steps or stages: provocation, momentary disturbance of the intellect, coupling, assent, prepossession, and passion.

== Non-religious usage ==
Temptation is usually used in a loose sense to describe actions which indicate a lack of self-control. Temptation is something that allures, excites, and seduces someone. Successful endeavors of goal-driven activity is threatened by the tempting nature of immediate pleasure. Infatuation can also lead to temptation as someone might do something for love in spite of one's better judgement.

In advertising, temptation is a theme common to many of the marketing and advertising techniques used to make products more attractive.

== Measuring temptation ==
Temptation is measured through indirect and implicit methods. Temptation could be measured using experimental constructs of undesirable situations or through a 'self-report' outcome measure of problem behaviors, which leads to the full extent and process of the underlying conflict and the implications that are oftentimes overlooked.

Research has found that components of an assessment that would allow for an individual to precisely understand the influence of self-control and other potential or protective variables on the process, experience, and resolution of temptation.

== Expressions of temptation ==
Generally individuals experience temptations in both positive and negative terms. For example, there is an individual who may experience temptation in the form of fearing the potential negative implications and consequences that can arise, whether it is in the context of standards or accountability related to the self, society, and/or the transcendent, including condemnation from one's conception of deity, higher power, or sense of responsibility to the universe or nature.

Another example, an individual may view their experience of temptation as an opportunity for growth, it could be intrapersonal growth, interpersonal growth, and/or transcendent growth, which includes recognizing constructive and/or collaborative interactions with the transcendent.

In regards to Spiritual struggle, research argues that the struggle can be looked upon as a gift, as an opportunity for growth, and as a means to improve one's life.

- Positive or negative religious coping and constructive or destructive emotions, "the valenced expression of temptation may lead to the salutary versus deleterious effects of temptation".

== The effects of temptation ==
There are valenced effects on a variety of outcomes from temptation. Such as the health and well-being of an individual. There is also the relief of stress that an individual may be experiencing. For example, undesirable, "illicit, and/or transcendent conflicts underlying the successful or failed resolution of the experience of temptation will likely have facilitative or debilitative effects on myriad aspects of physical health, mental health, and well-being". An individual's experience with temptation may influence a person's future experiences, predict future possibilities, and outcomes.

When an individual is attempting to address or resolve a complex experience of temptation, including transcendent levels and potential negative and positive expressions. For example, "mindfulness, humility, prayer, meditation, reframing, resoluteness, determination, other spiritual and/or positive psychological variables may be facilitators, or perhaps alternatives to, self-control as the primary arbiter of temptation".

== Resisting temptation ==
Self-control is commonly used by an individual to resist temptation. B. F. Skinner stated 9 methods for achieving this. Self-control is considered by some to be a limited resource, which is depleted by use. Some believe that self-control can be replenished and thus that the immediate effects of an individual's depleted self-control can be overcome, and that an individual must be able to identify the presence of a temptation (i.e., short-term desire) before self-control can affect an outcome.

== See also ==
- Persuasion
- Seduction
- Hercules at the crossroads
- Temptation of Christ
