= The world, the flesh, and the devil =

Enemies of the soul in Christianity

In Christian theology, the world, the flesh, and the devil (Latin: mundus, caro, et diabolus; Greek: ό κοσμος, ή σαρξ, και ό διαβολος) have been singled out "by sources from St Thomas Aquinas" to the Council of Trent, as "implacable enemies of the soul".

The three sources of temptation have been described as:

- The World — "indifference and opposition to God’s design", "empty, passing values";
- The Flesh — "gluttony and sexual immorality, ... our corrupt inclinations, disordered passions";
- The Devil — "a real, personal enemy, a fallen angel, Father of Lies".

== Sources ==
=== Scripture ===
Scripture that refers to the three sources of temptation is thought to include:

- Jesus' parable of the Sower (Mathew 13): the first two scenes of unproductive soil represent the devil and the flesh (not so much the world)
  - birds eating the seed -- (Matthew 13:19) "When anyone hears the message about the kingdom and does not understand it, the evil one comes and snatches away what was sown in their heart";
  - The seed falling among the thorns -- (Matthew 13:22) "refers to someone who hears the word, but the worries of this life and the deceitfulness of wealth choke the word, making it unfruitful."
- They are reflected in the Temptation of Christ in the desert:
  - the world: to tempt God by casting himself off the pinnacle;
  - the flesh: to turn stones into bread; and
  - the devil: to worship Satan.
- Ephesians 2:2–3a. You once walked, following the course of this world, following the prince of the power of the air, the spirit that is now at work in the sons of disobedience — among whom we all once lived in the passions of our flesh; in addition to "this world" and "passions of our flesh", "the term air often referred to the spiritual realm of angels and demons".

=== Christian literature ===
Many Christian sources refer to the world, the flesh, and the devil.

Peter Abelard states in his Expositiones that: Tria autem sunt quae nos tentant, caro, mundus, diabolus ("There are three things which tempt us, the flesh, the world, and the devil").

In his third objection to "prudence of the flesh" being a sin in Summa Theologica, Thomas Aquinas states: "just as man is tempted by the flesh, so too is he tempted by the world and the devil".

The Council of Trent's sixth session, in 1547, mentioned the phrase when writing on the gift of Perseverance:

Nevertheless, let those who think themselves to stand, take heed lest they fall, and, with fear and trembling work out their salvation, in labours, in watchings, in almsdeeds, in prayers and oblations, in fastings and chastity: for, knowing that they are born again unto a hope of glory, but not as yet unto glory, they ought to fear for the combat which yet remains with the flesh, with the world, with the devil, wherein they cannot be victorious, unless they be with God's grace, obedient to the Apostle, who says; We are debtors, not to the flesh, to live according to the flesh; for if you live according to the flesh, you shall die; but if by the spirit you mortify the deeds of the flesh, you shall live.

The phrase may have entered popular use in English through the Book of Common Prayer, which includes in its Litany: "[F]rom al the deceytes of the worlde, the fleshe, and the deuill: Good lorde deliuer us." Similarly, the rite of baptism requires renunciations of the devil, the world, and the flesh.

John of the Cross cites the world, the flesh, and the devil as threats to the perfection of the soul, and offers different "precautions" to be taken against each of these.

Some have responded to the idea of temptation by teaching or practicing asceticism; (see also ascetical theology and mortification of the flesh). The question of whether the world and the flesh are inherently bad and what the individual's proper relationship to them ought to be has long been debated in many philosophical and spiritual traditions.

== See also ==
- Temptation of Christ

== Sources ==
- Wenzel, Siegfried (January 1967). "The Three Enemies of Man". Mediaeval Studies. 29: 47–66. doi:10.1484/J.MS.2.306025. [reprinted in Wenzel, Siegfried (2010). Elucidations: medieval poetry and its religious backgrounds. Synthema. Vol. 6. Louvain: Peeters. pp. 17–38. ISBN 9782758400660.]
