= List of science fiction television programs, S =

This is an inclusive list of science fiction television programs whose names begin with the letter S.

== S ==
Live-action

- Salvation (2017-2018)
- Salvage 1 (1979)
- Sanctuary (2008–2012, Canada)
- Sapphire & Steel (1979–1982, UK)
- Science Fiction Theatre (1955–1957, anthology)
- seaQuest DSV renamed seaQuest 2032 for third season (1993–1996)
- Second Hundred Years, The (1967–1968)
- Secret Adventures of Jules Verne, The (2000)
- Secret Agent Man (2000)
- Secret Invasion (2023; miniseries)
- Secret Service, The (1969, UK, puppetry)
- Secret World of Alex Mack, The (1994–1998)
- Secrets of Isis, The (1975–1977)
- Sense8 (2015–2018)
- Sentinel, The (1997–1999)
- Seven Days (1998–2001)
- Sharad of Atlantis (1966, film) a.k.a. Undersea Kingdom (1936, film serial)
- Shazam! (1974–1977)
- Silo (2023-present)
- Silversun (2004, Australia)
- Sir Arthur Conan Doyle's The Lost World (1999–2002, Canada/Australia/New Zealand)
- Six Million Dollar Man (franchise):
  - Six Million Dollar Man, The (1973 (pilot films); 1974–1978)
  - Bionic Woman, The (1976-1978)
  - The Return of the Six Million Dollar Man and the Bionic Woman (1987, TV movie)
  - Bionic Showdown: The Six Million Dollar Man and the Bionic Woman (1989, TV movie)
  - Bionic Ever After? (1994, TV movie)
  - Bionic Woman (2007, remake of 1976 series)
- Sleepwalkers (1997–1998)
- Sliders (1995–2000)
- Small Wonder (1985–1989)
- So Weird (1999–2001)
- Something Is Out There (1988, miniseries)
- Space: 1999 (1975–1977, UK)
- Space: Above and Beyond (1995–1996)
- Space Academy (1977–1979)
- Space Cases (1996–1997)
- Space Command (1953–1954, Canada)
- Space Island One (1998, UK/Germany)
- Space Odyssey: Voyage To The Planets (2004, UK, docufiction)
- Space Patrol (1950–1955)
- Space Patrol (1963–1964, UK) a.k.a. Planet Patrol (US)
- Space Precinct (franchise):
  - Space Police (1986, Space Precinct pilot)
  - Space Precinct (1994–1995)
- Space Rangers (1993)
- Spadla z oblakov a.k.a. She Came Out of the Blue Sky (1978–1979, Czechoslovakia)
- Sparticle Mystery, The (2011–2013)
- Special Unit 2 (2001–2002)
- Spectre (1977 film) (1977, UK, film)
- Spellbinder (1995, Australia/Poland)
- Spider-Man (franchise):
  - Spider-Man (1978–1979, Japan)
  - Amazing Spider-Man, The (1977–1979)
  - Spidey Super Stories (1974–1977)
- Stand, The (1994, miniseries)
- Star Command (1996, film)
- Star Cops (1987, UK)
- Star-Crossed (2014)
- Star Maidens (1976, UK)
- Star Trek (franchise):
  - Star Trek: The Original Series a.k.a. ST:TOS (1966–1969)
  - Star Trek: The Next Generation a.k.a. ST:TNG (1987–1994)
  - Star Trek: Deep Space Nine a.k.a. ST:DS9 (1993–1999)
  - Star Trek: Voyager a.k.a. ST:VOY (1995–2001)
  - Star Trek: Enterprise a.k.a. ST:ENT (2001–2005)
  - Star Trek: Discovery a.k.a. ST:DSC (2017–2024)
  - Star Trek: Short Treks a.k.a. ST:ST (2018–present)
  - Star Trek: Picard a.k.a. ST:PIC (2020–2023)
  - Star Trek: Strange New Worlds (2022–present)
  - Star Trek: Section 31 (2025, special, film)
  - Star Trek: Starfleet Academy (2026-present)
- Star Wars (franchise):
  - Star Wars Holiday Special, The (1978, special, film)
  - Caravan of Courage: An Ewok Adventure (1984, film)
  - Ewoks: The Battle for Endor (1985, film)
  - R2-D2: Beneath the Dome (2001, mockumentary)
  - Star Wars: The Legacy Revealed (2007, special, documentary)
  - The Mandalorian (2019-)
  - The Book of Boba Fett (2021-2022)
  - Obi-Wan Kenobi (2022)
  - Andor (2022-)
  - Ahsoka (2023-)
  - The Acolyte (2024-)
  - Star Wars: Skeleton Crew (2024)
- Star Wolf (1978, Japan)
- Starflight: The Plane That Couldn't Land a.k.a. Starflight One (1983, film)
- Stargate (franchise):
  - Stargate Atlantis a.k.a. SGA (2004–2009, Canada/US)
  - Stargate SG-1 a.k.a. SG-1 (1997–2007, Canada/US, ship-based seasons 6–10)
  - Stargate Universe a.k.a. SGU (2009–2011, Canada/US)
- Starhunter (2000–2004, Canada)
- Starhyke (2011, UK)
- Starlost, The (1973–1974, Canada)
- Starman (1986–1987)
- Stepford Children, The (1987)
- Stingray (1964–1965, UK, puppetry)
- Stormworld (2009, Australia/Canada)
- Stowaway to the Moon (1975, film)
- Strange Days at Blake Holsey High a.k.a. Black Hole High (2002, Canada)
- Strange Frequency (2001) IMDb
- Strange Luck (1995–1996)
- Strange World (1999–2002)
- Stranger, The (1964–1965, Australia)
- Stranger, The a.k.a. Stranded in Space (1973, film, pilot)
- Stranger from Space (1951, UK) IMDb
- Stranger Things (2016–present)
- Strangerers, The (2000, UK)
- Street Hawk (1985)
- Super Force (1990–1992)
- Super Sentai (franchise):
  - Himitsu Sentai Gorenger a.k.a. Gorenger a.k.a. Goranger (1975–1977, Japan)
  - J.A.K.Q. Dengekitai a.k.a. The Jackers (1977, Japan)
  - Battle Fever J (1979–1980, Japan)
  - Denshi Sentai Denziman a.k.a. Denjiman, Electric Fighters a.k.a. Denziman (1980–1981, Japan)
  - Taiyo Sentai Sun Vulcan a.k.a. Sun Vulcan (1981–1982, Japan)
  - Dai Sentai Goggle-V a.k.a. Dai Sentai Goggle Five a.k.a. Goggle V (1982–1983, Japan)
  - Kagaku Sentai Dynaman (1983–1984, Japan) a.k.a. Dynaman (US)
  - Choudenshi Bioman (1984–1985, Japan) a.k.a. Bioman (US/France)
  - Dengeki Sentai Changeman a.k.a. Changeman (1985–1986, Japan)
  - Choushinsei Flashman a.k.a. Flashman (1986–1987, Japan)
  - Hikari Sentai Maskman a.k.a. Maskman (1987–1988, Japan) a.k.a. Bioman 2 (France)
  - Choujuu Sentai Liveman a.k.a. Liveman (1988–1989, Japan) a.k.a. Bioman 3 (France)
  - Kousoku Sentai Turboranger a.k.a. Turbo Rangers (1989–1990, Japan)
  - Chikyu Sentai Fiveman a.k.a. Fiveman a.k.a. Sky Rangers (1990–1991, Japan)
  - Chōjin Sentai Jetman a.k.a. Jetman (1991–1992, Japan)
  - Kyōryū Sentai Zyuranger a.k.a. Zyuranger a.k.a. Galaxy Rangers (1992–1993, Japan)
  - Gosei Sentai Dairanger a.k.a. Dairanger a.k.a. Star Rangers (1993–1994, Japan)
  - Ninja Sentai Kakuranger a.k.a. Kakuranger a.k.a. Ninja Rangers (1994–1995, Japan)
  - Chōriki Sentai Ohranger a.k.a. Ohranger (1995–1996, Japan)
  - Gekisou Sentai Carranger a.k.a. Carranger (1996–1997, Japan)
  - Denji Sentai Megaranger a.k.a. Megaranger (1997–1998, Japan)
  - Seijuu Sentai Gingaman a.k.a. Gingaman (1998–1999, Japan)
  - Kyuukyuu Sentai GoGoFive a.k.a. GoGoFive (1999–2000, Japan)
  - Mirai Sentai Timeranger a.k.a. Timeranger (2000–2001, Japan)
  - Hyakujuu Sentai Gaoranger a.k.a. Gaoranger (2001–2002, Japan)
  - Ninpuu Sentai Hurricaneger a.k.a. Hurricaneger (2002–2003, Japan)
  - Bakuryū Sentai Abaranger a.k.a. Abaranger (2003–2004, Japan)
  - Tokusou Sentai Dekaranger a.k.a. Dekaranger (2004–2005, Japan)
  - Mahou Sentai Magiranger a.k.a. Magiranger (2005–2006, Japan)
  - GoGo Sentai Boukenger a.k.a. Boukenger (2006–2007, Japan)
  - Juken Sentai Gekiranger a.k.a. Gekiranger (2007–2008, Japan)
  - Engine Sentai Go-onger a.k.a. Go-onger (2008–2009, Japan)
  - Samurai Sentai Shinkenger a.k.a. Shinkenger (2009–2010, Japan)
  - Tensou Sentai Goseiger a.k.a. Goseiger (2010–2011, Japan)
  - Kaizoku Sentai Gokaiger a.k.a. Gokaiger (2011–2012, Japan)
  - Tokumei Sentai Go-Busters a.k.a. Go-Busters (2012–2013, Japan)
  - Unofficial Sentai Akibaranger a.k.a. Akibaranger (2012–2013, Japan)
  - Zyuden Sentai Kyoryuger a.k.a. Kyoryuger (2013–2014, Japan)
  - Ressha Sentai ToQger a.k.a. ToQger (2014–2015, Japan)
  - Shuriken Sentai Ninninger a.k.a. Ninninger (2015–2016, Japan)
  - Doubutsu Sentai Zyuohger a.k.a. Zyuohger (2016–2017, Japan)
  - Uchu Sentai Kyuranger a.k.a. Kyuranger (2017–2018, Japan)
  - Kaitou Sentai Lupinranger VS Keisatsu Sentai Patranger a.k.a. Lupinranger VS Patranger (2018–2019, Japan)
  - Super Sentai Strongest Battle (2019, Japan)
  - Kishiryu Sentai Ryusoulger a.k.a. Ryusoulger (2019–2020, Japan)
  - Mashin Sentai Kiramager a.k.a. Kiramager (2020–2021, Japan)
- Supercar (1961–1962, puppetry)
- Supergirl (2015–2021)
- Superhuman Samurai Syber-Squad (1994–1995, US Gridman the Hyper Agent adaptation)
- Superman (franchise):
  - Adventures of Superman (1952–1958)
  - Adventures of Superboy, The (1961, pilot)
  - Superboy a.k.a. Adventures of Superboy, The (1988–1992)
  - Lois & Clark: The New Adventures of Superman (1993–1997)
  - Smallville (2001–2011)
  - Superman & Lois (2021–present)
- Surface (2005–2006)
- Survivors (franchise):
  - Survivors (2008–2010, UK)
  - Survivors (1975–1977, UK)
- Swamp Thing (franchise):
  - Swamp Thing (1990–1993)
  - Swamp Thing (2019)

Animation

- Saber Marionette (franchise):
  - Saber Marionette J (1996–1997, Japan, animated)
  - Saber Marionette J to X (1998–1999, Japan, animated)
- Saber Rider and the Star Sheriffs (1987–1988, Japan, animated)
- Samurai 7 a.k.a. Samurai Sebun (2004, Japan, animated)
- Samurai Jack (2001–2004 2017, animated)
- Savage Dragon (1995–1996, animated) IMDb
- Scavengers Reign (2023, animated)
- Sealab 2020 (1972, animated)
- Sealab 2021 (2000–2005, animated)
- Secret of Cerulean Sand (2002, Japan, animated)
- Secret Saturdays, The (2008–2010, animated)
- Sectaurs (1985, animated)
- Serial Experiments Lain (1998, Japan, animated)
- Sgt. Frog (2004–2011, Japan, animated)
- Shadow Raiders (1998–1999, Canada, animated)
- Sherlock Holmes in the 22nd Century (1999–2001, Scotland, animated)
- Sherlock Hound (1984–1985, Japan, animated)
- Shin Hakkenden (1999, Japan, animated)
- Silent Möbius (1998, Japan, animated)
- Silver Surfer (1998, animated)
- SilverHawks (1986, animated)
- Six God Combination Godmars (1981–1982, Japan, animated)
- Sky Commanders (1987, animated)
- Skyland a.k.a. Skyland, The New World a.k.a. Skyland, Le Nouveau Monde (French) (2005–2007, France/Canada/Luxembourg, animated)
- SKYSURFER Strike Force (1995–1996, animated)
- Slugterra (2012–2016, US/Canada, animated)
- Snorks (1984–1989, Belgium/US, animated) (elements of science fiction)
- Solar Opposites (2020–present, animated)
- SoltyRei (2005–2006, Japan, animated)
- Sonic the Hedgehog (franchise):
  - Adventures of Sonic the Hedgehog a.k.a. AoStH (1993, US/France, animated)
  - Sonic the Hedgehog: The Animated Series a.k.a. Sonic SatAM a.k.a. SatAM (1993–1995, US, animated)
  - Sonic Underground a.k.a. Sonic le Rebelle (1998–1999, France/US, animated)
  - Sonic X (2003–2004, Japan, animated)
- Space Ace (1965–1966, Japan, animated)
- Space Angel (1962–1964, animated)
- Space Battleship Tiramisu (2018, Japan, animated)
- Space Battleship Yamato a.k.a. Space Cruiser Yamato (franchise):
  - Space Battleship Yamato (1974–1975, Japan, animated)
  - Space Battleship Yamato II (1978–1979, Japan, animated)
  - Yamato: The New Voyage a.k.a. Bon Voyage Yamato (1979, Japan, animated, film)
  - Star Blazers (1979–1984, Space Battleship Yamato adaptation, US/Japan, animated)
  - Space Battleship Yamato III (1980–1981, Japan, animated)
  - Space Battleship Yamato 2199 (2012–2013, Japan, animated)
- Space Carrier Blue Noah a.k.a. Thundersub (US/Canada) a.k.a. Nave Anti-Espacial (Spanish) (1979–1980, Japan, animated)
- Space Dandy (2014, Japan, animated)
- Space Emperor God Sigma (1980–1981, Japan, animated)
- Space Kidettes, The (1966–1967, animated) IMDb
- Space Pirate Mito (1999, Japan, animated)
- Space Runaway Ideon (1980–1981, Japan, animated)
- Space Sentinels a.k.a. The Young Sentinels (1977, animated)
- Space Stars (1981–1982, anthology, animated) (franchise):
  - Herculoids, The (1967–1969, 1981–1982, animated)
  - Astro and the Space Mutts (1981–1982, Jetsons, The spin-off, animated)
  - Space Ghost (1966–1968, animated)
  - Space Ghost Coast to Coast a.k.a. SGC2C (1994–2001, Space Ghost parody, animated)
  - Teen Force (1981–1982, animated)
  - Cartoon Planet (1995–2000, 2012–2014, Space Ghost Coast to Coast spin-off, animated)
- Space Strikers (1995, animated)
- Space Warrior Baldios (1980–1981, Japan, animated)
- Spaceballs: The Animated Series (2008, animated)
- Spaced Out (2002, France/Canada, animated)
- Spartakus and the Sun Beneath the Sea a.k.a. Mondes Engloutis, Les (The Engulfed Worlds) a.k.a. Shagma and Arkadia (1985–1987, France, animated)
- Special Armored Battalion Dorvack (1983–1984, Japan, animated)
- Speed Racer (US adaptation) a.k.a. Mach Go Go Go (Japan) (franchise):
  - Speed Racer (1967–1968, Japan, animated)
  - New Adventures of Speed Racer, The (1993–1994, US, animated)
  - Speed Racer X (1997–2003, Japan/US, animated)
  - Speed Racer: The Next Generation (2008–2013, US, animated)
- Spicy City (1997, anthology, animated)
- Spider-Man (franchise):
  - Spectacular Spider-Man, The (2008–2009, animated)
  - Spider-Man (1967–1970, animated)
  - Spider-Woman (1979–1980, animated)
  - Spider-Man (1981–1982, animated)
  - Spider-Man and His Amazing Friends (1981–1983, animated)
  - Spider-man Unlimited (1999–2001, animated)
  - Spider-Man: The Animated Series (1994–1998, animated)
  - Spider-Man (2017–2020, animated)
  - Spider-Man: The New Animated Series (2003, animated)
  - Ultimate Spider-Man (2012–2017, animated)
  - Your Friendly Neighborhood Spider-Man (2025-present)
- Spider Riders (2006–2007, Canada/Japan, animated)
- Spiral Zone (1987, animated)
- Spliced (2010–2011, Canada, animated)
- SpongeBob SquarePants (1999–present, animated) (elements of science fiction in some episodes)
- Star Trek (franchise):
  - Star Trek: The Animated Series a.k.a. ST:TAS (1973–1974, animated)
  - Star Trek: Lower Decks a.k.a. ST:LOW (2020–2024, animated)
  - Star Trek: Prodigy a.k.a. ST:PRO (2021–present, animated)
- Star Wars (franchise):
  - Star Wars: Droids (1985–1986, US/Canada, animated)
  - Star Wars: Ewoks (1985–1986, US/Canada, animated)
  - The Great Heep (1986, Star Wars: Droids sequel, animated)
  - Star Wars: Clone Wars (2003–2005, animated)
  - Star Wars: The Clone Wars (2008–2014, 2020, animated)
  - Lego Star Wars: The Quest for R2-D2 (2009, film, animated)
  - Lego Star Wars: The Padawan Menace (2011, special, animated)
  - Star Wars Rebels (2014–2018, animated)
  - Star Wars Resistance (2018–2020, animated)
  - Star Wars: The Bad Batch (2021–2024, animated)
  - Tales (2022-present)
- StarCom: The U.S. Space Force (1987, animated)
- Stargate Infinity a.k.a. SGI a.k.a. Infinity (2002–2003, animated)
- Starship Operators (2005, Japan, animated)
- Starzinger (1978–1979, Japan, animated)
- Static Shock (2000–2004, animated)
- Steel Jeeg (1976–1976, Japan, animated)
- Stellvia (2003, Japan, animated)
- Steven Universe (franchise)
  - Steven Universe (2013–2019, animated)
  - Steven Universe: The Movie (2019, film, animated)
  - Steven Universe Future (2019–2020, animated)
- Storm Hawks (2007–2009, Canada, animated)
- Strain: Strategic Armored Infantry (2006–2007, Japan, animated)
- Stratos 4 (2003, Japan, animated)
- Street Fighter (franchise):
  - Street Fighter II V (1995–1996, Japan, animated)
  - Street Fighter (1995–1997, animated)
- Street Sharks (1994–1995, animated)
- Strike Witches (franchise):
  - Strike Witches (2008, Japan, animated)
  - Strike Witches 2 (2010, Japan, animated)
- Stripperella (2003–2004, animated) (elements of science fiction)
- Super Friends (franchise):
  - Super Friends (1973–1974, animated)
  - All-New Super Friends Hour, The (1977–1978, animated)
  - Challenge of the Super Friends (1978, animated)
  - Super Friends (1980–1982, animated)
  - Super Friends: The Legendary Super Powers Show (1984–1985, animated)
  - Super Powers Team: Galactic Guardians, The (1985–1986, animated)
  - World's Greatest Super Friends, The (1979–1980, animated)
- Super Hero Squad Show, The (2009–2011, animated)
- Super Robot Monkey Team Hyperforce Go! a.k.a. SRMTHFG (2004–2006, US/Japan, animated)
- Super Robot Wars (franchise):
  - Super Robot Wars Original Generation: Divine Wars (2006–2007, Japan, animated)
- Superjail! (2008–2014, animated)
- Superman (franchise):
  - New Adventures of Superman, The (1966–1970, animated)
  - Superman/Aquaman Hour of Adventure, The (1967–1968, animated)
  - Superman (1988, animated)
  - Superman: The Animated Series (1996–2000, animated)
  - Krypto the Superdog (2005–2006, animated)
- Superstretch and Microwoman (1979, animated, Tarzan and the Super 7 segment)
- Swamp Thing (1991, animated)
- SWAT Kats: The Radical Squadron (1993–1995, animated)
- Sym-Bionic Titan (2010–2011, animated)
- Soldier
