= Bionic (disambiguation) =

Bionics is the application of biological methods and systems to engineering systems and technology.

Bionic(s) may also refer to:

== Technology ==
=== Medical ===
- Bionic contact lens, being developed to provide a virtual display
- Visual prosthesis, often referred to as a bionic eye, an experimental device intended to restore functional vision
- Cochlear implant, often referred to as a bionic ear, provides a sense of sound to a person who is profoundly deaf or severely hard of hearing

=== Other technology ===
- Bionic (software), a standard C library developed for the Android embedded system
- Droid Bionic, a cell phone running the Android operating system
- Mercedes-Benz Bionic, a concept car first introduced in 2005
- name used in Apple silicon models (A11 to A16)
- code name of Ubuntu 18.04 LTS (Bionic Beaver) OS

== Film and television ==
- Bionics, a fictionalized cybernetic augmentation science in a television franchise based on the 1972 novel Cyborg by Martin Caidin:
  - The Six Million Dollar Man, a 1973 television series starring Lee Majors
  - The Bionic Woman, a 1976 series starring Lindsay Wagner
  - The Return of the Six Million Dollar Man and the Bionic Woman, a 1987 television movie
  - Bionic Showdown: The Six Million Dollar Man and the Bionic Woman, a 1989 television movie
  - Bionic Ever After?, a 1994 television movie
  - Bionic Woman (2007 TV series), a reboot of the 1976 series

== Music ==
- Bionic (Christina Aguilera album)
  - "Bionic" (Christina Aguilera song)
- Bionic (Sandbox album)
- "Bionic" (King Adora song)

== Architecture ==
- Bionic architecture, a design movement
- Bionic Tower, an imagined vertical city
