= Bionic Showdown: The Six Million Dollar Man and the Bionic Woman =

1989 television film directed by Alan J. Levi

- Genre: Action; Science fiction
- Based on: Cyborg by Martin Caidin The Bionic Woman by Kenneth Johnson
- Screenplay by: Michael Sloan; Brock Choy
- Story by: Michael Sloan; Robert DeLaurentis
- Directed by: Alan J. Levi
- Starring: Lindsay Wagner; Lee Majors; Richard Anderson; Sandra Bullock; Jeff Yagher; Martin E. Brooks; Lee Majors II
- Music by: Bill Conti
- Country of origin: United States
- Original language: English

Production
- Executive producer: Michael Sloan
- Producers: Nigel Watts; Bernadette Joyce
- Production locations: High Park, Toronto, Ontario; Copps Coliseum, Hamilton, Ontario
- Cinematography: Maris H. Jansons
- Editor: Bill Goddard
- Running time: 96 minutes
- Production company: Universal

Original release
- Network: NBC
- Release: April 30, 1989

Bionic Showdown: The Six Million Dollar Man and the Bionic Woman (often simply Bionic Showdown) is a television science fiction film which originally aired on April 30, 1989 on NBC. The film reunited the main casts of the television series The Six Million Dollar Man and its spin-off The Bionic Woman. It is notably the first television appearance of actress Sandra Bullock and the first film which strongly featured her. In the film, a diplomatic crisis threatens world peace after an unknown bionic person steals top secret information.

Series regular characters Steve Austin (Lee Majors) and Jaime Sommers (Lindsay Wagner), Oscar Goldman (Richard Anderson), and Dr. Rudy Wells (Martin E. Brooks) are featured along with returning television movie character Jim Castillian (Lee Majors II, the real-life son of Lee Majors) and new characters Kate Mason (Sandra Bullock) and Jim Goldman (Jeff Yagher).

Following the success of the first reunion movie, The Return of the Six Million Dollar Man and the Bionic Woman (1987), Bionic Showdown was quickly greenlit and doubled as a "backdoor pilot" for a potential series based on the character of Kate Mason, but never materialized. Another television movie followed, Bionic Ever After? (1994).

== Plot ==
Oscar Goldman is reluctantly attending a gala banquet at The Pentagon to celebrate the upcoming "World Unity Games" unhappy that he now has to practice détente with former enemies in the era of glasnost. Also at the gala, Steve Austin is nervously preparing to propose to his love interest Jaime Sommers (a secret which his colleagues all seem to know). Just as he is about to ask the question, the building is put on alert when a masked person infiltrates the building, breaks into an office, and steals top secret information from the computer system. In the ensuing escape, several guards are thrown against a wall and Oscar is thrown out of a window by the masked person - who seems to be bionic.

The next day, Kate Mason is preparing for the final stage necessary to become bionically-enhanced. Dr. Rudy Wells, through a series of surgeries, has implanted Kate with electrical bone strengtheners, muscle stimulation contacts, bionic blood vessels, and a control computer inside her brain. The final activation is performed in front of an audience of military and civilian observers. Because there are supposed to be only four known bionic humans - Steve, Jaime, Steve's son Michael, and now Kate - General McAllister has heightened security and questions everyone involved in the bionic program about the theft.

A masked person sets a bomb on Steve's boat, but Jim Goldman is caught in the blast instead and becomes paralyzed. When McAllister refuses to authorize bionic surgery for Jim due to budgetary concerns, Oscar resigns from the OSI. Jaime and Steve, worried that he may either be defecting or become a target, track Oscar down to a bar where he drunkenly begins to talk about his "robot" friends. They take Oscar home to sleep it off, but the masked bionic assailant breaks in and kidnaps him, displaying superior bionic strength to both Steve and Kate. Oscar wakes in the presence of the Soviet General Dzerinsky and CIA Director Charles Estiman, who are working together. They entice him to defect and cooperate, so that they can restore the tense political climate that keeps them all in business. The bionic infiltrator is revealed to be Allan Devlin, the OSI agent who had been assigned to monitor Kate.

Steve and General McAllister decide to place Kate undercover among the competitors at the World Unity Games as her first OSI mission, with Jim posing as her trainer in hopes of finding information about Oscar or the infiltrators. A group of men corner Kate, intent on using a bionic disruptor to disable and kill her. Jim rescues her, showing that his paralysis was a ruse. He tells her the plan was orchestrated by Oscar in order to initiate the chain of events which would lead to the enemies trying to recruit him. The Games begin at Copps Coliseum in Toronto, and the OSI team is monitoring security when they get a transmission from Oscar reading them, at gunpoint, a prepared message that the target is the Soviet Premier who is due to arrive shortly. Jaime's bionic hearing picks up a second message from Oscar tapping out his location in Morse code. She and Steve rescue Oscar and, with the knowledge that Devlin is the traitor, deduce that the real target is Soviet Foreign Minister Yuri Kellagyn.

Kate scans the arena during her final race and spots Devlin about to set off a bomb in Kellagyn's viewing box. Running off the track at blurring speed, she throws a shot put shot at Devlin to stop him and gives chase. A bionic fight ensues leading to the rooftop, where Kate catches Devlin off-guard and throws him to the ground below, ending the threat.

Later, while the OSI team celebrates the safe conclusion of the Games, Gen. McAllister reads them a congratulatory note from the President. Steve takes Jaime aside to try to propose but is interrupted once again - by Jaime proposing to him instead.

== Cast ==
=== Starring ===
- Lee Majors as retired Air Force Colonel Steve Austin, a former astronaut who was bionically-enhanced after a crash who used his newfound strength to operate as a covert agent for the Office of Scientific Intelligence (OSI).
- Lindsay Wagner as former tennis pro Jaime Sommers, who was bionically-enhanced after a skydiving accident, and operated as an agent for the OSI.
- Richard Anderson as Oscar Goldman, Director of Operations of the OSI and long-time friend to both Steve and Jaime.
- Sandra Bullock as Kate Mason, a young woman who has used a wheelchair since age six due to congenital muscle deterioration.
- Jeff Yagher as Jim Goldman, the nephew of Oscar who is also a competitive sprinter, hurdler, and a stand-up comic
- Martin E. Brooks as Dr. Rudy Wells, the surgeon who pioneered bionics and completed the enhancements of Steve and Jaime.
- Lee Majors II, as Jim Castillian, an agent for OSI

=== Guest stars ===
- Josef Sommer as Charles Estiman, Deputy Director of the CIA
- Geraint Wyn Davies as Allan Devlin, an OSI agent
- Lawrence Dane as General Dzerinsky, a Soviet rival of Oscar
- Robert Lansing as General McAllister, a "by-the-numbers" military official assigned to reorganize the OSI

=== Co-starring ===
- Carolyn Dunn as Sally
- Jack Blum as Larry
- Andrew R. Dan as Comrade Kellagyn, the Soviet Foreign Minister
- David Adamson as Randall
- James Kee as O.S.I. officer
- Marcia Levine as Tanya, a Soviet track competitor
- Robert McClure as Dr. Williams
- David Nerman as Peter
- Steve Pernie as Russ
- Steve Morris as Sports announcer

== Production ==
Based on the ratings success of the prior movie, The Return of the Six Million Dollar Man and the Bionic Woman (1987), Bionic Showdown was quickly greenlit.

== Home media ==
All three reunion films were included alongside The Six Million Dollar Man in a 40-disc DVD set from Time Life on November 23, 2010 and a 35-disc DVD set from Universal Home Video on October 13, 2015. The films were released by Shout! Factory on Blu-ray in 2022 as part of their Six Million Dollar Man and the Bionic Woman complete series sets.
