= The Return of the Six Million Dollar Man and the Bionic Woman =

- Genre: Action; Science Fiction
- Based on: Cyborg by Martin Caidin The Bionic Woman by Kenneth Johnson
- Screenplay by: Michael Sloan
- Story by: Michael Sloan; Bruce Lansbury
- Directed by: Ray Austin
- Starring: Lee Majors; Lindsay Wagner; Tom Schanley; Richard Anderson; Martin E. Brooks; Lee Majors II
- Music by: Marvin Hamlisch
- Country of origin: United States
- Original language: English

Production
- Executive producer: Michael Sloan
- Producer: Bernadette Joyce
- Cinematography: William K. Jurgensen
- Editors: Buford F. Hayes, A.C.E.; Vic Lackey
- Running time: 98 minutes
- Production company: Universal
- Budget: $4.8 million

Original release
- Network: NBC
- Release: May 17, 1987

The Return of the Six Million Dollar Man and the Bionic Woman is a made-for-television science fiction action film which originally aired on May 17, 1987, on NBC. The movie reunited the main casts of the television series The Six Million Dollar Man and its spin-off The Bionic Woman. Set 10 years after the events of those series, Steve Austin (Lee Majors) and Jaime Sommers (Lindsay Wagner) are asked to come out of retirement and confront a paramilitary criminal organization called Fortress, Steve's estranged son Michael Austin (Tom Schanley), and their own past relationship. Series regular characters Oscar Goldman (Richard Anderson), head of the OSI, and Dr. Rudy Wells (Martin E. Brooks) also star, along with new characters OSI agent Jim Castillian (Lee Majors II, the real-life son of Lee Majors) and Lyle Stenning (Martin Landau), leader of Fortress.

The movie was a "backdoor pilot" for a potential series based on the character of Michael Austin, but the series never materialized. Two more television movies followed, Bionic Showdown: The Six Million Dollar Man and the Bionic Woman (1989) and Bionic Ever After? (1994).

== Plot summary ==
Despite its leader, Lyle Stenning, being held in prison, the paramilitary criminal organization known as "Fortress" has become active again after ten years. Adhering to the creed "America for Americans" and vowing to focus on domestic rather than international action, Fortress has begun a campaign of terror by attacking munitions depots to steal automatic weapons and explosives. Stenning, who was captured by Steve Austin, also wants to acquire the secrets of bionics to further his goals.

Former lovers, both bionically enhanced, Steve Austin and Jaime Sommers have been retired from the OSI for ten years. They have remained out of contact with each other due to the complex history of their relationship. In exposition, its explained that after the two fell in love, Sommers was in a skydiving accident which caused extensive injuries. She was rebuilt with bionics, but her body rejected them ("The Bionic Woman: Part 1 & Part 2"). The experience caused partial amnesia which made her forget her romantic feelings for Steve ("The Return of the Bionic Woman: Part 1 & Part 2"). She later fell in love with fellow OSI agent Chris Williams (as shown in season 3 of The Bionic Woman). Steve, not wanting to interfere, refused to go on a mission to aid Chris and Jaime. On that mission, the two became separated and an explosion hit Jaime, which caused a major concussion. She had to be evacuated, which left Chris alone and he was later killed by a sniper. When she recovered from the concussion, all of her memories were restored and her feelings for Steve came into conflict with her love and grief for Chris.

Michael Austin is the estranged son of Steve. He is an Air Force cadet pilot who has the technical knowledge to graduate, but a reckless temperament which concerns his instructors. They contact Steve and ask him to intervene. At his graduation solo flight, an accident causes the jet to crash and leaves Michael with extensive injuries, much like his father experienced. Michael is rebuilt with next-generation bionics by Dr. Rudy Wells and sent to Jaime's care for rehabilitation to control his new bionic body and his emotions.

Fortress, led by an escaped Stenning, attempts to capture Steve and Jaime on separate occasions, but succeed in capturing Dr. Rudy Wells, the pioneer of bionics, and Michael as he is recovering. Steve, Jaime, Oscar Goldman, and the OSI mount a successful rescue, taking down Fortress and capturing its leadership once again.

== Extended plot ==
Oscar Goldman narrates a memo detailing the recent activity of a paramilitary organization called "Fortress" which has been raiding military sites, stealing automatic weapons and other munitions. The group is shown easily completing their most recent raid, and member Santiago states that the group will now be focusing their efforts in America.

Oscar visits Steve Austin as his boat returns to the dock and explains that Fortress is active again, despite the leader, Lyle Stenning, still being in prison. Oscar notes the name of Steve's boat is Summer Maiden and the two discuss the romantic relationship Steve had with Jaime Sommers and the circumstances of Chris Williams' death in Budapest. Steve refuses to come out of retirement, but Oscar reminds Steve that Stenning may still come after him for putting him in prison.

Steve is asked by Air Force colleagues to speak to his estranged son, Michael Austin, because he is a reckless pilot but is due to graduate soon. Steve agrees to meet his son for dinner. Oscar learns of the dinner, and arranges for Jaime to be at the same restaurant under the pretense of a blind date with Martin. Jaime and Steve encounter one another, but when Jaime tries to leave and Steve asks her to stop, she accidentally throws him through a window. Michael arrives to see Steve surrounded by broken glass, and the two walk on the pier discussing their lost years. Steve has trouble relating and Michael leaves.

The next day, Fortress members attempt to capture Steve in order to duplicate his bionics which leads to a high-speed car chase. Steve evades them and goes to Oscar's office. The two discuss the kidnapping attempt and the reaction of Jaime at the restaurant, which Steve regards with confusion. Oscar tells him that Jaime, after getting a concussion on her last mission, now remembers everything about her relationship with Steve, including her feelings.

Oscar visits Jaime in a park, where she is being surveilled from the bushes by Fortress members intent on taking her as an easier bionic target than Steve. Jaime tells Oscar about the overwhelming flood of recollection and emotions she had when her memory was fully restored, and her frustration about her lost relationship with Steve. Oscar consoles her, but tells her to stay away from Steve due to the Fortress threat, and reminds her that they may target her, as well.

Steve surprises Lyle Stenning in prison about the return of Fortress. Stenning explains that the new focus is on "America for Americans", to eradicate a "cancer spreading faster than any communist takeover". Steve threatens Stenning, telling him not to hurt anyone close to him or he'd come for him "personally". Stenning laughs off the threat. Steve then visits Dr. Rudy Wells, who shows him some next-generation bionics, including a bionic eye which shoots a laser.

Outside of her office, Fortress members force Jaime into their car. Steve arrives and runs after them, jumps onto a building and then onto the roof of the car. Jaime kicks her way out as Steve rolls the car over. The mercenaries drive away, but Steve's bionic eye zooms onto the license plate. The two go into the same restaurant from earlier, and Steve tells Jaime about his son: how he met Michael's mother, their short marriage and divorce, his discovery later that she'd had his son, and that his son is now about to graduate at the Air Force base. Steve explains that he didn't try to reestablish a relationship with Jaime because during her amnesia she'd fallen in love with fellow OSI agent Chris Williams, and that he had refused a mission to aid Williams - the same mission where he was killed by a sniper. Jaime explained she was with Williams on that mission, but that an explosion forced Jaime to be evacuated due to the concussion, leaving Williams alone. The two feel that they both abandoned Williams, which has caused the mutual distance in the last few years, but resolve to stay in contact more and Steve invites Jaime to Michael's graduation solo flight.

Michael and several Air Force colleagues go to a local pub to celebrate the next day's graduation, monitored by agent Castillian who is there watching Michael in case of Fortress trouble, but a rival student group starts a brawl. Steve arrives and jumps into the brawl. Fortress members are watching as they leave, and try to capture Michael by chasing them with a car to split them up. Caught in a dead-end alley, Steve takes hold of Michael and bionically jumps them both out of danger.

The next day at the graduation, Oscar informs Steve that Stenning has escaped from prison. As Michael solo flight is about to end, the jet begins to overheat and lose hydraulic pressure. Michael bails out just as the jet crashes. Later, Jaime and Steve are waiting at the hospital when Dr. Shepherd (Bryan Cranston) comes out to explain that Michael's spine has snapped, a metal shard has severed the optic nerves to his right eye, both legs are crushed, and that his right arm had to be amputated, but that there is no brain damage and his heart is strong. Steve goes directly to Oscar's office and demands that he let Dr. Wells operate on his son - offering to deliver Stenning and Fortress in exchange. Oscar refuses the offer, telling Steve that Rudy's team is already on the way to the hospital and that the operation is already approved. Rudy places implants into Michael's legs that will allow him to run very fast, attached a fully cybernetic right arm, reinforced his spine and ribs with metal, and gave him the laser eye seen earlier. Steve goes in to speak to a recovering Michael, who calls himself a "freak". Jaime tells Steve to have patience while she works with Michael at the rehabilitation clinic.

In a musical montage (set to "Automatic"), Steve and Castillian are shown working to track down Fortress while Michael is training his new body with Jaime, ultimately reaching a running speed of nearly 300 mph and using his laser eye to blast open a door lock. Jaime also works with Michael on his emotional rehabilitation as he grows accustomed to his new life.

Santiago kidnaps Rudy along with all of his equipment. Michael and fellow patient Carol are also taken by Fortress to their base of operations in an abandoned glass factory to meet Stenning, who threatens the life of Rudy and another hostage should Michael escape. OSI Chief John Praiser is revealed to be a member of Fortress, who has been confounding the search for Fortress from within. Through Castillian, Steve and Jaime inform Oscar about the spy and he promises to provide them loyal OSI agents to assist with the rescue. Stenning interrogates Michael to get the details of his Bionic abilities, but he doesn't cooperate. Stenning instructs Santiago to kill Michael, and to make Rudy "take him apart".

Steve and Jaime infiltrate the factory and rig Fortress' stolen explosives to a timer. Rudy and Michael are freed, and Michael runs at a blurring speed to rescue the last hostage, Carol. Explosions disorient Fortress and prevent their escape while OSI arrives to assist. Oscar takes Praiser into custody, Michael incapacitates Stenning with his laser, and the rest of Fortress is forced to surrender.

Later, the rescue team is seen having a celebratory toast. Michael and Steve agree to begin building their relationship. Steve and Jaime leave with each other, after telling Oscar to "try not to find" them if he needs them in the future.

== Cast ==
Starring

- Lee Majors as retired Air Force Colonel Steve Austin, a former astronaut who was bionically enhanced after a crash who used his newfound strength to operate as a covert agent for the Office of Scientific Intelligence (OSI). Now retired from the OSI for 10 years, he is a charter boat captain.
- Lindsay Wagner as former tennis pro Jaime Sommers, who was bionically enhanced after a skydiving accident, operated briefly as an agent for the OSI, and is now working at a Los Angeles rehabilitation center for disadvantaged youth.
- Tom Schanley as Air Force pilot Michael Austin, estranged son of Steve. Michael's mother Karen died of pneumonia and he was sent to live with his Aunt Mary at age six.
- Richard Anderson as Oscar Goldman, Director of Operations of the OSI and long-time friend to both Steve and Jaime.
- Martin E. Brooks as Dr. Rudy Wells, the surgeon who pioneered bionics and completed the enhancements of Steve and Jaime.
- Lee Majors II as Jim Castillian, a flamboyant agent of OSI.

Guest stars

- Martin Landau as Lyle Stenning, the leader of a paramilitary mercenary group named Fortress, who has been in prison for 10 years after being caught by Steve and the OSI.
- Gary Lockwood as John Praiser, Chief of Staff of the OSI.

Also starring

- Will Bledsoe as Tom Brubaker, a U.S. Air Force cadet and rival of Michael
- Gary Blumsack as Capt. Jerry Dreyfuss, a U.S. Air Force instructor concerned about Michael's recklessness
- William Campbell as General Forest
- Robert F. Hoy as Kyle
- Terry Kiser as Santiago, codename used by Stenning's second-in-command of Fortress
- Cheryl McMannis as Carol, a blind patient at Jaime's rehabilitation clinic
- Patrick Pankhurst Duke Rennecker, a U.S. Air Force instructor concerned about Michael's recklessness
- Bob Seagren as Martin, an OSI agent
- Danil Torppe as Reardon
- Susan Woollen as Trisha Sullivan

Co-starring

- Scott Kraft as Nick
- Bryan Cranston as Dr. Shepherd
- Keith Farrell as Jim Matlon
- Phil Nordell as Christopher
- Pamela Bryant as Blond Girl
- Catherine McGoohan as Receptionist
- Deborah White as Sally

With

- Kawena Charlot as Megan
- Sandey Grinn as Waiter
- Leonard Kibrick as Jensen
- Michele Minailo as Holly
- Julie H. Morgan as Hostess

== Production ==
The idea for the bionic reunion came out of an improvised scene between Anderson (Oscar) and Majors (Steve) while they vacationed together in 1986. Anderson contacted Sidney Sheinberg at Universal, who agreed to develop it. A chance meeting with Brandon Tartikoff lead to the movie being sold to NBC. The rather large $4.8 million budget was approved because the movie was also presented as a backdoor pilot for a series featuring bionically enhanced Michael Austin as a former Air Force "hot shot" to leverage the popularity of the 1986 film Top Gun.

== Response ==
The film was 4th in Nielsen ratings for the week ending on May 17, 1987. Based on the "fantastic" ratings of Return, a follow-up film was approved.

== Home media ==
All three reunion films were included alongside The Six Million Dollar Man in a 40-disc DVD set from Time Life on November 23, 2010 and a 35-disc DVD set from Universal Home Video on October 13, 2015. The films were released by Shout! Factory on Blu-ray in 2022 as part of their Six Million Dollar Man and the Bionic Woman Complete Series Sets.
