= Richard Anderson =

American actor (1926–2017)

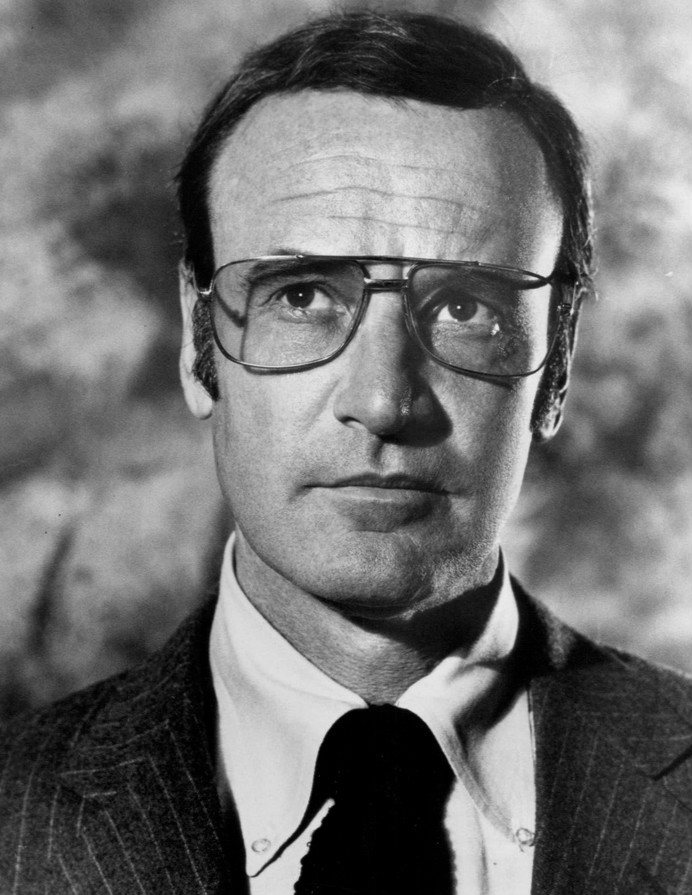
- Anderson as Oscar Goldman in The Six Million Dollar Man, 1976
- Born: Richard Norman Anderson; August 8, 1926; Long Branch, New Jersey, U.S.
- Died: August 31, 2017 (aged 91); Beverly Hills, California, U.S.
- Occupation: Actor
- Years active: 1947–2017
- Known for: The Six Million Dollar Man; The Bionic Woman
- Spouses: Carol Lee Ladd (m. 1955; div. 1956); Katharine Thalberg (m. 1961; div. 1973)
- Children: 3

Richard Norman Anderson (August 8, 1926 – August 31, 2017) was an American film and television actor. One of his best-known roles was his portrayal of Oscar Goldman, the boss of Steve Austin (Lee Majors) and Jaime Sommers (Lindsay Wagner) in both The Six Million Dollar Man and The Bionic Woman television series between 1974 and 1978 and their subsequent television movies: The Return of the Six Million Dollar Man and the Bionic Woman (1987), Bionic Showdown: The Six Million Dollar Man and the Bionic Woman (1989) and Bionic Ever After? (1994).

== Early life ==
Anderson was born in Long Branch, New Jersey, the son of Olga (née Lurie, 1905–1966) and Harry Anderson. He appeared in high school plays after moving to Los Angeles.

Anderson served in the United States Army during World War II.

== Career ==
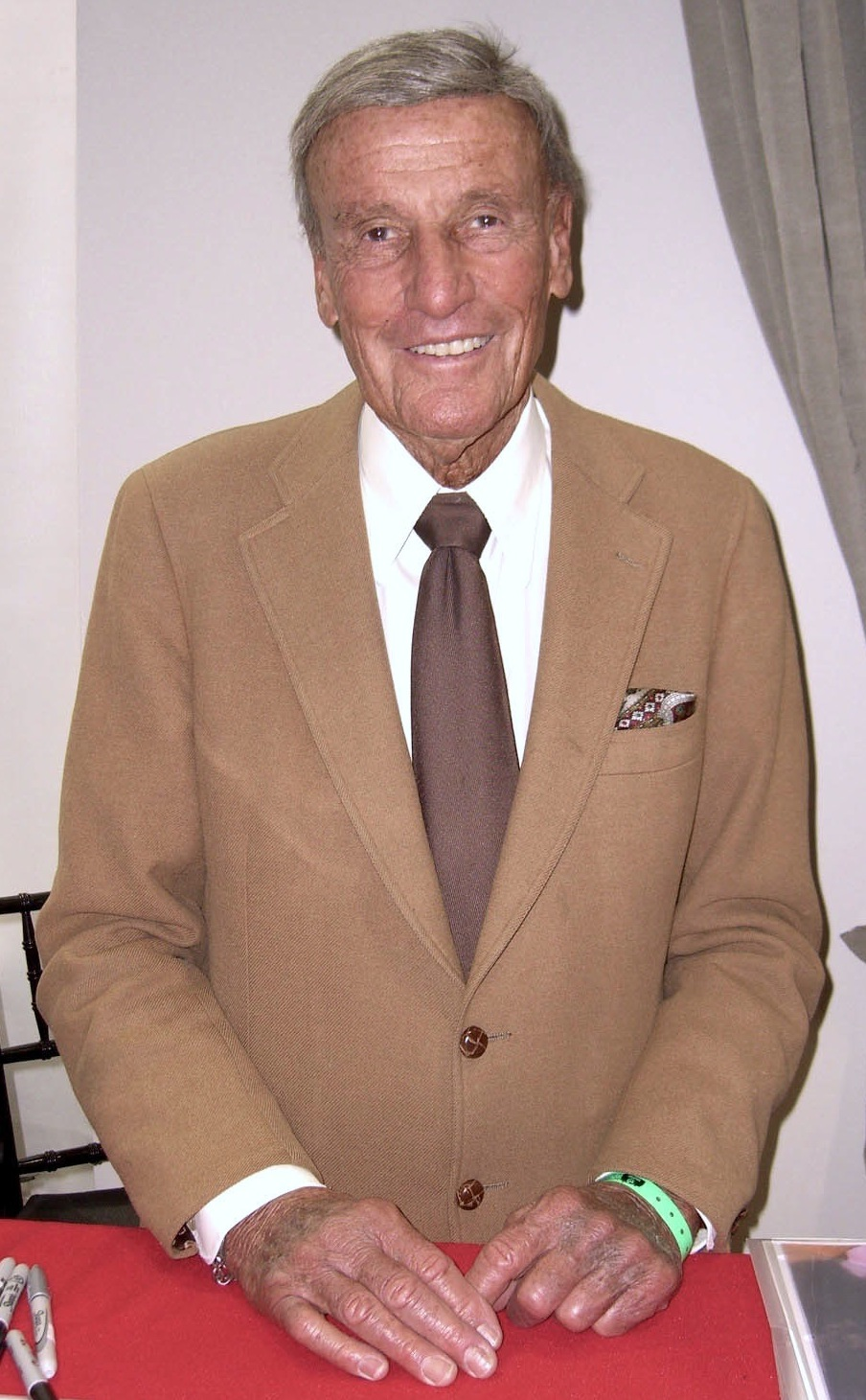
Anderson at the Big Apple Convention in New York City (October 2, 2010)

Before Anderson began his career in 1950 as a Metro-Goldwyn-Mayer contract player, he studied at the Actors' Laboratory Theatre, which led to work in radio and stock theater. His many films at MGM included The Magnificent Yankee (1950) as Reynolds, The Student Prince (1954) as Lucas, and Forbidden Planet (1956) as Chief Engineer Quinn.

After his six years at MGM, he was contracted to 20th Century Fox.

Among his later films were the World War I drama Paths of Glory (1957) directed by Stanley Kubrick in which Anderson played the prosecuting attorney. Anderson also worked as a dialogue coach and admired Kubrick's approach to directing. As he recalled in an American Legends website interview with Martin Pitts: "As soon as we started shooting, I knew immediately what Stanley was interested in: The shot. Always the shot. He worked with George Krause, the German cinematographer, to make sure that everything looked like a newsreel of World War I. Kubrick had studied many photographs of the war in the library. The film was low keyed and had a grainy look to it. That's what Stanley was interested in."

Anderson played Ricardo Del Amo in the second season of Zorro (1957), a friend and rival of Diego de la Vega (Guy Williams). He was the object of the unrequited love of Clara Varner (Joanne Woodward) in The Long, Hot Summer (1958) and a suspicious military officer in Seven Days in May (1964).

In the 1960s, Anderson made appearances in 23 episodes of Perry Mason during the series' final season (1965–66) as Police Lieutenant Steve Drumm, replacing the character of Lt. Arthur Tragg, played by Ray Collins, who died in 1965. Before he became a Perry Mason regular, Anderson made guest appearances in two episodes: as defendant Edward Lewis in "The Case of the Accosted Accountant", and Jason Foster in "The Case of the Paper Bullets" (both 1964).

He also appeared on Steve Canyon, The Untouchables, Wagon Train, The Rifleman, Daniel Boone, Thriller, The Eleventh Hour, Redigo, Combat!, Twelve O'Clock High, I Spy, The Man from U.N.C.L.E., The Fugitive (as varied characters in several episodes; in the series' 1967 finale he played the brother-in-law to the protagonist Dr. Richard Kimble), The Wild Wild West, Bonanza, The Green Hornet, The Invaders, and The Big Valley. In 1961–62, Anderson co-starred with Marilyn Maxwell in an ABC production of Bus Stop. He was a guest star in the last episode of season 1 of Mission: Impossible (1966) as Judge Wilson Chase.

In 1965, he played Judge Lander in the episode "Kate Melville and the Law" of the syndicated series Death Valley Days. He appeared in The Wild Wild West, S3 E17 "The Night of the Headless Woman" as the corrupt San Francisco shipping inspector James Jeffers (1968). In 1970–71, Anderson starred as Chief George Untermeyer in the Burt Reynolds series Dan August.

Anderson first appeared as Oscar Goldman in the second episode of The Six Million Dollar Man ("Wine, Women, and War", 1973). He portrayed the character through the series' end in 1978 and on the spinoff series The Bionic Woman for its entire run from 1976 to 1978. Anderson was a guest-star on other TV series in the 1960s and 1970s, including Hawaii Five-O, Wanted Dead or Alive, Gunsmoke, Ironside, Columbo and The Love Boat (he appeared in S2 E20 as Dr. Art Akers, Dr. Adam Bricker's former mentor, a surgeon who had since lost an arm; the episode aired February 10, 1979).

He appeared in the television movie The Night Strangler as the villain, Dr. Richard Malcolm. Anderson was just as busy in the 1980s on Charlie's Angels, Matt Houston, Knight Rider, Remington Steele, Cover Up, The A-Team, The Fall Guy, Simon & Simon, and Murder, She Wrote. He played murder suspect Ken Braddock in the first two-hour episode of the revived Perry Mason, starring Raymond Burr, titled "Perry Mason Returns" (1985). Anderson had a recurring role as Senator Buck Fallmont on Dynasty from 1986 to 1987. He portrayed President Lyndon B. Johnson in the 1987 miniseries Hoover vs. The Kennedys.

In the 1990s, Anderson served as narrator and a recurring guest star for Kung Fu: The Legend Continues. He was also a commercial spokesperson for the Shell Oil Company in the United States, known as the Shell Answer Man., appearing in commercials from 1976 to 1982.

== Personal life and death ==
Anderson was first married to Carol Lee Ladd. After their divorce, he married Katharine Thalberg, daughter of movie producer Irving Thalberg and actress Norma Shearer. Their marriage also ended in divorce. He had three daughters with Thalberg. Anderson died on August 31, 2017, from heart failure in Beverly Hills, California. He was 91.

== Recognition ==
In 2007, Anderson was honored with a Golden Palm Star on the Palm Springs Walk of Stars.

== Filmography ==
- The Pearl (1947)
- The Vanishing Westerner (1950) as Deputy Sheriff Jeff Jackson
- A Life of Her Own (1950) as Hosiery Man (uncredited)
- The Magnificent Yankee (1950) as Reynolds, Secretary
- Grounds for Marriage (1951) as Tommy
- Storm Warning (1951) as Interne (uncredited)
- Payment on Demand (1951) as Jim Boland
- Cause for Alarm! (1951) as Lonesome Sailor
- Go for Broke! (1951) as Lieutenant (uncredited)
- No Questions Asked (1951) as Detective Walter O'Bannion
- Rich, Young and Pretty (1951) as Bob Lennart
- The People Against O'Hara (1951) as Jeff Chapman
- Across the Wide Missouri (1951) as Dick Richardson
- The Unknown Man (1951) as Bob Masen
- Just This Once (1952) as Tom Winters
- Scaramouche (1952) as Philippe de Valmorin
- Holiday for Sinners (1952) as Father Victor Carducci
- Fearless Fagan (1952) as Capt. Daniels - Company J
- The Story of Three Loves (1953) as Marcel (segment "Equilibrium")
- I Love Melvin (1953) as Harry Flack
- Dream Wife (1953) as Henry Malvine
- Give a Girl a Break (1953) as Burton Bradshaw
- Escape from Fort Bravo (1953) as Lieutenant Beecher
- The Student Prince (1954) as Lucas
- Betrayed (1954) as John (uncredited)
- Hit the Deck (1955) as Lt. Jackson
- It's a Dog's Life (1955) as George Oakley
- Western Union (1955) as Steve Gibson (unaired pilot)
- Forbidden Planet (1956) as Engineering Officer Quinn
- A Cry in the Night (1956) as Owen Clark
- The Search for Bridey Murphy (1956) as Dr. Deering
- Three Brave Men (1956) as Naval Lt. Bill Horton
- The Buster Keaton Story (1957) as Tom McAffee
- Paths of Glory (1957) as Major Saint-Auban
- Merry Andrew (1958) as Ugo (uncredited)
- The Long, Hot Summer (1958) as Alan Stewart
- Curse of the Faceless Man (1958) as Dr. Paul Mallon
- Zorro Season 2 Episode 10 “The Practical Joker” (1958) as Ricardo Del Amo
- Zorro Season 2 Episode 11 “The Flaming Arrow” (1958) as Ricardo Del Amo.
- Zorro Season 2 Episode 12 “Zorro Fights a Duel” (1958) as Ricardo Del Amo
- Zorro Season 2 Episode 13 “Amnesty for Zorro” (1959) as Ricardo Del Amo
- Compulsion (1959) as Max Steiner
- The Rifleman (1959) as Tom Birch
- The Gunfight at Dodge City (1959) as Dave Rudabaugh
- The Wackiest Ship in the Army (1960) as Lt. Dennis M. Foster
- The Rifleman (1960) as Lariat Jones
- "The Rifleman" (Dec. 1960) Episode "Miss Bertie" as a Gunslinger named Duke Jennings
- Thriller (1960) as Oliver Judson (Season 1, Episode 7: "The Purple Room")
- The Rifleman (1961) Episode "Flowers by the Door" as Jason Gowdy
- Wanted Dead or Alive (1961) Episode "Epitaph" as the Sheriff
- "The Rifleman" (April 1962) Episode "Milly's Brother" as Harry Chase
- The Rifleman (1963) Season 5, Episode 21, "The Bullet" as Griff
- A Gathering of Eagles (1963) as Colonel Ralph Josten
- Johnny Cool (1963) as Correspondent
- Seven Days in May (1964) as Colonel Ben Murdock
- Combat! (1964) as Sergeant Perkins in the episode "A Silent Cry" on ABC
- The Alfred Hitchcock Hour ("Who Needs an Enemy?" [s02 e28]; 1964) as Eddie (Edward Turtin)
- Kitten with a Whip (1964) as Grant
- The Big Valley (1965) as Dr. Travers (Episode: "Last Train to the Fair")
- Seconds (1966) as Dr. Innes
- The F.B.I. (1966) as Christian Palmer (Season 2, Episode 8: "Collision Course")
- Perry Mason (1965–1966) as Lt. Steve Drumm (Season 9, 24 episodes)
- The Green Hornet (1966) as Phil Trager (Episode: "Ace in the Hole")
- Mission: Impossible (1967) as judge in "The Psychic"
- The Ride to Hangman's Tree (1967) as Steven Carlson
- The Hardy Boys: The Mystery of the Chinese Junk (1967) as Fenton Hardy
- The Invaders (1967) as Blake (Season 2, Episode 5: The Enemy)
- "Wild, Wild West" (1968) as James Jeffers Ship Inspector (Season 3, Episode 17: "The Night of the Headless Woman")
- Big Valley (1968) as Nathan Springer (Episode: Fall of a Hero)
- Land of the Giants (1969) as newspaper reporter Joe Simmons (Season 2, Episode 2: "Six Hours to Live")
- Macho Callahan (1970) as Officer
- Menace on the Mountain (1970) as Major Galt
- Gunsmoke (1970) as Gregorio (Episode: "The War Priest")
- Tora! Tora! Tora! (1970) as Navy Captain John B. Earle
- Dan August (TV series) (1970-71) as Police Chief Untermeyer
- Columbo (1971) as murder victim Bryce Chadwick (Season 1, Episode 5: "Lady in Waiting")
- Doctors' Wives (1971) as D.A. Douglas
- The Astronaut (1972) as Dr. Wylie
- The F.B.I. (1972) as Dan Wheaton (Season 8, Episode 4: "The Franklin Papers")
- The Honkers (1972) as Royce Owens
- Play It as It Lays (1972) as Les Goodwin
- The Longest Night (1972) as Harry Eaton
- The Six Million Dollar Man (99 episodes; 1973–1978) as Oscar Goldman
- Hawaii Five-O (1973) as Goodman
- The F.B.I. (1973) as Paul Higgins (Season 9, Episode 1: The Big Job)
- The Night Strangler (1973) as Dr. Richard Malcolm
- Black Eye (1974) as Dole
- Gunsmoke (1974) as Maj. Aaron Coltraine
- The Bionic Woman (58 episodes; 1976–1978) as Oscar Goldman
- Never Give Up (1978) as US Green Beret Officer
- The Immigrants (1978) as Thomas Seldon
- Murder by Natural Causes (1979) as George Brubaker
- The French Atlantic Affair (1979) as Terrence Crown
- Condominium (1980) as Henry Churchbridge
- Darkroom (1981) as Bill Bellamy
- Kane & Abel (1985) as Alan Lloyd
- The Stepford Children (1987) as Lawrence Denton
- Hoover vs. The Kennedys (1987) as Lyndon B. Johnson
- The Player (1992) as Himself
- Gettysburg (1993) as General George G. Meade
- The Glass Shield (1995) as Watch Commander Clarence Massey
- The Blood Trail (2015)
