= Spirit Lost =

- Directed by: Neema Barnette
- Produced by: Tim Reid and Sherri G. Sneed
- Starring: Leon Robinson; Cynda Williams; Regina Taylor
- Production companies: BET Films; United Image Entertainment
- Distributed by: Live Entertainment
- Release date: March 25, 1997
- Running time: 90 minutes
- Country: United States
- Language: English

Spirit Lost is a 1997 American horror drama film directed by Neema Barnette, produced by Tim Reid, and starring Leon Robinson, Cynda Williams and Regina Taylor.

== Premise ==
After John, a painter, and his wife move into an old house on an island, a seductive widow ghost shows up in mirrors, windows and in John's dreams and nightmares. She eventually lures him into moving into his attic studio while she tries to scare his now unhappy and pregnant wife away.

== Cast ==
- Leon Robinson as John
- Cynda Williams as Arabella
- Regina Taylor as Willy
- James Avery as Dr. Glidden
- Yvonne Brisendine as Dr. Fisher
- Deacon Dawson as Realtor
- J. Michael Hunter as Harrison Adders
- Juanita Jennings as Vera
- Alan Sader as Randolph Smythe

== Development ==
Spirit Lost is loosely based on the book of the same name by Nancy Thayer.

== Release ==
Spirit Lost was released direct to home video in 1997.

== Themes ==
Robin R Means Coleman wrote in her book Horror Noire that Spirit Lost was a "rare horror film that was nearly an all-female affair" and that the film prominently featured characters that served as moral arbiter and saviors. She would later revisit the film in her 2023 work The Black Guy Dies First, further noting the codependent relationship between John and the ghostly Arabella.
