= Bionic Ever After? =

- Newspaper advertisement
- Genre: Science fiction; Action
- Based on: Cyborg by Martin Caidin The Bionic Woman by Kenneth Johnson
- Screenplay by: Michael Sloan; Norman Morrill
- Story by: Michael Sloan
- Directed by: Steven Stafford
- Starring: Lindsay Wagner; Lee Majors; Richard Anderson; Farrah Forke; Martin E. Brooks; Anne Lockhart; Alan Sader; Geordie Johnson
- Music by: Ron Ramin
- Country of origin: United States
- Original language: English

Production
- Executive producer: Michael Sloan
- Producer: Michael O. Gallant
- Production location: Charleston, South Carolina
- Cinematography: Gideon Porath
- Editor: Frank Jimenez
- Production companies: MCA Television Entertainment; Gallant Entertainment

Original release
- Network: CBS
- Release: November 29, 1994

Bionic Ever After? is a made-for-television science fiction action film which originally aired on November 29, 1994 on CBS. The movie reunited the main casts of the television series The Six Million Dollar Man and its spin-off The Bionic Woman. Series regular characters Steve Austin (Lee Majors) and Jaime Sommers (Lindsay Wagner), Oscar Goldman (Richard Anderson), and Dr. Rudy Wells (Martin E. Brooks) are featured along with new characters Kimberly Harmon / Haviland (Farrah Forke), Carolyn MacNamara (Anne Lockhart), John MacNamara (Alan Sader), and Miles Kendrick (Geordie Johnson). In the movie, the long-overdue wedding of Steve and Jaime is put in doubt when Jaime's bionic systems start to fail and Steve is caught in a tense hostage situation.

This is the third and final reunion movie in the franchise featuring most of the original actors from the 1970s television series, following The Return of the Six Million Dollar Man and the Bionic Woman (1987) and Bionic Showdown: The Six Million Dollar Man and the Bionic Woman (1989).

== Plot ==
Jaime Sommers is counseling OSI agent Kimberly Harmon, who was severely traumatized on her last mission and begs Jaime for help getting out of the OSI. Jaime informs Oscar Goldman that Kimberly is unfit for an upcoming mission and needs time to heal. On the way to meet her fiancé Steve Austin at his boat, her bionic ear malfunctions, greatly amplifying the sounds around her and causing her to wince in pain. The two discuss the plans for their upcoming wedding. Later, while playing a bionically-intense racquetball game with Steve, Jaime's right hand appears to be giving her trouble, allowing Steve to win for the first time. The next evening, her hand pain begins to worsen and Steve takes notice. That night as Jaime lays immobile in bed, someone replaces one of the computer chips in her bionic right arm with a new one labelled "Phase 2".

At the U.S. Embassy in Nassau, Bahamas, Oscar visits with U.S. ambassador John MacNamara and his wife Carolyn, who are preparing to host a ball with guest of honor, tennis star Astaad Rashid. Oscar leaves with regrets, explaining that he is best man at Steve and Jaime's wedding and can't stay. On the day of the ball, an armed team in a black van infiltrates the embassy, taking the Ambassador, his wife, and their guests hostage. The group, led by Miles Kendrick, deploys a Scud missile with a nuclear core pointed at the heart of the city as insurance against a rescue attempt and demand that Rashid be handed over to them.

Back in Washington, Jaime explains to Oscar that her bionic systems seem to be breaking down and that she's worried about the impact it will have on Steve and their wedding. The discussion is put on hold as word of the embassy attack comes in. Later, while in a counseling session with Kimberly, Jaime collapses and is rushed to the hospital. Dr. Rudy Wells, the pioneering bionic surgeon, tells Steve that Jaime might have neurological damage and may never be bionic again. In the hospital, Jaime sends Steve away, and he is forced to cancel the wedding.

Not willing to sit idly as Jaime suffers and to repay a life-saving debt to John MacNamara, Steve asks Oscar for an assignment to resolve the embassy situation. Kimberly meets with Steve, telling him that Oscar assigned her as his partner on the mission. Inside the embassy, Kendrick's men are searching for Rashid, hidden somewhere within. Steve and Kimberly arrive in Nassau and begin making preparations for the rescue. After giving him a cup of drugged coffee, Kimberly cuts open Steve's bionic arm in the same way Jaime's was earlier.

Dr. Wells discovers that Jaime is suffering from a computer virus which has infiltrated her bionic systems. He resolves to shut down her power supply completely and replace the infected chips. Jaime wakes and Rudy tells her that he had taken the opportunity to have some "improvements" made. Rudy talks to Oscar, explaining that he had an associate in his bionics research, Dr. Jason Haviland, with whom he had a falling out and who he suspects might have a motive and knowledge to sabotage Jaime. She and Oscar visit Connie Haviland, Jason's widow, who explains that leaving the OSI and bionics research took a toll, causing him to drink heavily until he died of cirrhosis four months earlier. They spot a picture of Kimberly in Connie's house, revealing that Kimberly Harmon is in fact Kimberly Haviland, Jason's daughter, and that she is familiar with her father's work. OSI finds shortwave radio equipment in her apartment, revealing that she had been in contact with Kendrick.

Steve makes his entry into the embassy by bionically jumping to the water tower which is coincidentally where Rashid has been hiding. Kendrick's men, hearing sound from the tower, capture Rashid instead of Steve. His bionics start to break down and he, too, is captured by Kendrick and thrown into the basement.

Jaime arrives in Nassau and confronts Kimberly before making her way into the embassy under cover of darkness aided by bionic night vision, one of the "improvements" of which Rudy spoke. She kicks down the basement door and rescues Steve and the other hostages. A radiation alert rings out across the city and Oscar sends a nuclear containment (NEC) team into the embassy. Kendrick's men change into matching NEC outfits to cover their escape by replacing the real NEC team. Kendrick's team loads into an NEC truck, driven by Kimberly, taking an unconscious Rashid with them. Steve and Jaime give chase, bionically running after the truck. Miles pulls out a remote detonator telling Kimberly that once they escape, he'll ensure no one will follow them. Jaime grabs a manhole cover and, using a new bionic targeting display, throws it at the truck, causing it to flip over. In a moment of regret, Kimberly whispers a warning to Jaime about the detonator. She tells Steve, who shoots the remote and ends the threat.

Some time later, the wedding of Jaime and Steve commences. Rudy gives away the bride to Steve, who eagerly skips straight to the "I do". The couple kiss, ignoring the rest of the formalities, and the annoyed minister pronounces them husband and wife.

== Cast ==
Starring

- Lee Majors as retired Air Force Colonel Steve Austin, a former astronaut who was bionically-enhanced after a crash and used his newfound strength to operate as a covert agent for the Office of Scientific Intelligence (OSI).
- Lindsay Wagner as former tennis pro Jaime Sommers, who was bionically-enhanced after a skydiving accident, former school teacher, and operated as an agent for the OSI. Jaime now holds a Ph.D. and is a family counselor.
- Richard Anderson as Oscar Goldman, Director of Operations of the OSI and long-time friend to both Steve and Jaime.
- Farrah Forke as Kimberly Harmon / Haviland, an OSI agent getting counseling from Jaime for a traumatic experience on her last mission
- Martin E. Brooks as Dr. Rudy Wells, the surgeon who pioneered bionics and completed the enhancements of Steve and Jaime.
- Alan Sader as John MacNamara, U.S. ambassador to the Bahamas.
- Anne Lockhart as Carolyn MacNamara, the wife of John
- Geordie Johnson as Miles Kendrick, a mercenary

Featuring

- Ivan Sergei as Astaad Rashid, a charismatic tennis star
- Lee Majors II as Jim Castillian, an OSI agent
- Robert D. Raiford as Minister
- James Shanta as Rock
- Michael Hartson as Stone
- Ann Pierce as Connie Havilland
- Michael Camden Richards as NEC Technician
- Shanghai Stafford as Marine Captain
- General Fermon Judd, Jr. as Bahamas Policeman
- Michael Burgess as Delta Commando
- Steffen Foster as Reporter

Cameo

- Dave Thomas (uncredited) appears as one of the hostages held in the embassy basement. Thomas is the founder of the Wendy's fast food chain.

== Production ==
During development, the movie was titled Bionic Breakdown referring to the subplot involving Jaime's failing bionics.

== Response ==
The movie was ranked #29 in the Nielsen ratings for the week it first aired, with 18.0 million viewers, a 12.1 rating, and an 18 share.

== Home media ==
All three reunion films were included alongside The Six Million Dollar Man in a 40-disc DVD set from Time Life on November 23, 2010 and a 35-disc DVD set from Universal Home Video on October 13, 2015. The films were released by Shout! Factory on Blu-ray in 2022 as part of their Six Million Dollar Man and the Bionic Woman complete series sets.
