= Nancy Thayer =

American novelist (born 1943)

- Born: December 14, 1943 (age 82); Emporia, Kansas, U.S.
- Occupation: Novelist
- Spouse: Charley Walters
- Children: Joshua Thayer; Samantha Wilde (novelist)
- Parent: Jane Patton

Nancy Thayer (born December 14, 1943) is an American novelist who has written thirty-one books.

== Personal life ==
Thayer is the daughter of Jane Patton and was born on December 14, 1943, in Emporia, Kansas. Thayer married her second husband, Charles Walters, a music store owner, in 1984. They live in Nantucket, Massachusetts, and have two children: Joshua Thayer and Samantha Wilde, who is also a novelist.

== Career ==
Thayer published her first novel when she was close to forty and already the mother of her two children. She has published regularly since. Her novels focus on contemporary social issues coupled with interesting plots and characters.

Her books have been translated into Dutch, Italian, German, Danish, French, Spanish, Portuguese, Polish, Swedish, Romanian, Hebrew and Finnish.

== Books ==
- Stepping (1980, Doubleday)
- Three Women At the Waters' Edge (1981, Doubleday)
- Bodies and Souls (1983, Doubleday)
- Nell (1984, William Morrow)
- Morning (1987, Charles Scribner's Sons)
- Spirit Lost (1988, Charles Scribner's Sons)
- My Dearest Friend (1988, Charles Scribner's Sons)
- Everlasting (1991, Viking)
- Family Secrets (1993, Viking)
- Belonging (1995, St. Martin's Press)
- An Act Of Love (1997, St. Martin's Press)
- Between Husbands and Friends (1999, St. Martin's Press)
- Custody (2001, St. Martin's Press)
- The Hot Flash Club (2003, Ballantine)
- The Hot Flash Club Strikes Again (2004, Ballantine)
- Hot Flash Holidays (2005, Ballantine)
- The Hot Flash Club Chills Out (2006, Ballantine)
- Moon Shell Beach (2008, Ballantine)
- Summer House (2009, Ballantine)
- Beachcombers (2010, Ballantine)
- Heat Wave (2011, Ballantine)
- Summer Breeze (2012, Ballantine)
- Island Girls (2013, Ballantine)
- A Nantucket Christmas (2013, Ballantine)
- Nantucket Sisters (2014)
- An Island Christmas (2014, Ballantine Books) ISBN 978-0-553-39387-3
- The Guest Cottage (2015, Ballantine Books)
- The Island House (2016)
- Secrets in Summer (2017)
- A Nantucket Wedding (2018)
- Surfside Sisters (2019)
- Let It Snow (2019)
- Girls of Summer (2020)
- Family Reunion (2021)
- Summer Love (2022)
- All the Days of Summer (2023)
- The Summer We Started Over (2024)
- Summer Light on Nantucket (2025)
- Nantucket Christmas Stroll (2026)

== Articles ==
- "Plotting the Novel" (1988)

== Adaptations ==
- Stepping was adapted as 13 part series for British Broadcasting Corporation (BBC)
- Spirit Lost was adapted for film and released by United Image Entertainment
