= Alan Sader =

American actor (1940–2026)

- Born: Julian Alan Sader; September 9, 1940; Bruington, Virginia, U.S.
- Died: July 7, 2026 (aged 85)
- Occupations: Actor, television spokesperson
- Years active: 1981–2026

Julian Alan Sader (September 9, 1940 – July 7, 2026) was an American actor. He was perhaps best known for being the television spokesperson for ChildFund International (formerly Christian Children's Fund), an international child sponsorship charity, a post he held since 1992.

== Life and career ==
From 1972 to 1982, he was an owner/producer of Tidewater Dinner Theater in Norfolk, Virginia.

Major films include The Prince of Tides (1991) and Evan Almighty (2007).

Sader appeared in numerous television shows such as Dawson's Creek, Legacy and Matlock. Locally in Virginia, Sader also appeared in television commercials for companies such as Farm Fresh Supermarkets and Haynes Furniture.

As of 2018, he lived in Richmond, Virginia, where he remained active in acting.

Sader died on July 7, 2026, at the age of 85.

== Filmography ==
- Finnegan Begin Again (1985) – Convention Drunk
- Marie: A True Story (1985) – Professor
- King Kong Lives (1986) – 1st Faculty Doctor
- CBS Schoolbreak Special (TV), episode "Never Say Goodbye" (1988) – Dr. Hildebrand
- Lincoln (aka Gore Vidal's Lincoln, 1988 TV miniseries) – Sickles
- The Ryan White Story (TV, 1989) – Reverend Williams
- Unspeakable Acts (1990) – Judge Newman
- Nightmare in Columbia County (alternate title: Victim of Beauty: The Dawn Smith Story – TV, 1991) – Prosecutor
- The Prince Of Tides (1991) – Spencer Richardson
- Labor of Love: The Arlette Schweitzer Story (1993) – Dr. Howard Gilroy
- CBS Schoolbreak Special (TV), episode "If I Die Before I Wake" (1993) – Minister
- Taking Liberty (1993)
- Bionic Ever After? (1994) – John MacNamara
- Assault at West Point: The Court-Martial of Johnson Whittaker (1994) – Colonel Lugenbeel
- Murderous Intent (1995) – Dr. Halprin
- Tad (TV film about Tad Lincoln, 1995) – Cameron
- Twisted Desire (1996) – Judge
- Spirit Lost (1997) – Randolph Smythe
- Stonebrook (1999) – Mathis
- Something the Lord Made (2004) – Hecker's Crony
- Evan Almighty (2007) – Congressperson
- Lincoln (2012 film directed by Steven Spielberg) – Sergeant-at-Arms

== Awards ==
- Best Actor, Richmond Theatre Critics' Circle Awards, King Lear, Quill Theatre – Richmond Shakespeare Festival, 2011.
