= Nigel Watts =

Australian rugby league footballer

Personal information
- Full name: Nigel Kevin Watts
- Born: 21 October 1919 Enmore, New South Wales, Australia
- Died: 17 February 1995 (aged 75) Sydney, New South Wales, Australia

Playing information
- Position: Centre
Club
Years	Team	Pld	T	G	FG	P
1944–45	St. George	14	1	10	0	23
Representative
Years	Team	Pld	T	G	FG	P
1946	NSW Country	1	0	1	0	2
- Source: As of 7 August 2019

Nigel Kevin Watts (21 October 1919 – February 17, 1995) was an Australian rugby league footballer who played in the 1940s.

== Playing career ==
Watts was a schoolboy rugby union standout at St Joseph's College, going on to star for the Eastern Suburbs Rugby Union club before embarking on a brief rugby league career at St. George during World War II. Since he had never played rugby league before, the residential rule did not apply to Watts, who was a resident of Bondi at the time. Watts served in the Australian Army during his time at the Saints. After being discharged from the Army, he transitioned to a captain-coach role in the Illawarra competition in 1946. He represented a combined South Coast Division representative team that defeated the touring Great Britain national rugby league team 15–12 at Wollongong, New South Wales on 2 June 1946.

== Death ==
Watts died in Sydney on 17 February 1995
