= Jaime Sommers (The Bionic Woman) =

- Lindsay Wagner as Jaime Sommers.
- First appearance: "The Bionic Woman" (episode of The Six Million Dollar Man, 1975)
- Last appearance: Bionic Ever After? (TV movie), 1994
- Created by: Kenneth Johnson
- Portrayed by: Lindsay Wagner; Carlena Gower (childhood flashbacks)

In-universe information
- Alias: The Bionic Woman
- Species: Human
- Gender: Female
- Occupation: Secret agent, schoolteacher, former professional tennis player
- Spouse: Steve Austin
- Children: Michael Austin (stepson)

Jaime Sommers is a fictional character from the science fiction action series The Bionic Woman (1976–1978) and was created by Kenneth Johnson. American actress Lindsay Wagner, who first played the role in the 1970s American television series The Six Million Dollar Man, would continue this role in the spin-off series. In the late 1980s and early 1990s, Wagner reprised the role in several reunion television films.

Jaime Sommers is a former professional tennis star who suffers near-fatal injuries in a skydiving accident. Following cutting-edge surgery, she becomes the first female cyborg. She is assigned to spy missions as an occasional agent of the Office of Scientific Intelligence, while also teaching middle school students at a local airbase. Through the use of cybernetic implants known as bionics, Jaime is given an amplified bionic ear which allows her to detect sounds, at frequencies outside of the human ability to hear, over uncommonly long distances. She also has extraordinary strength in her bionic right arm and both legs, which enable her to run at speeds exceeding 60 miles per hour.

Jaime is portrayed as the third cyborg, following the astronaut/test pilot Steve Austin and race car driver Barney Hiller (seen in the November 1, 1974, and November 9, 1975, episodes of The Six Million Dollar Man). In the reunion specials, Jaime has become a clinical counselor after retiring from the OSI. She assists Doctor Rudy Wells in training others in the use of their bionics. She trains Austin's son, Michael Austin, and paraplegic Kate Mason to manage their new abilities and counsels them both as a therapist and as someone who faced the same challenges.

In 2004, the character was listed in Bravo's 100 Greatest TV Characters. AOL named her one of the 100 Most Memorable Female TV Characters.

== Cost ==
According to the opening credits of The Bionic Woman, the cost of Jaime Sommers' bionic implants was classified information. This lack of specificity has sparked frequent debates among fans as to whether it is appropriate to call Jaime "The Six Million Dollar Woman". The scripts reveal only a few contradictory clues. In the spin-off's opening story "Welcome Home, Jaime", she suggests to Oscar that she must have cost as much as Steve. He replies, "Well, not quite. The parts are smaller, after all." In a season-one episode, "Fly Jaime", where Jaime and Dr. Rudy Wells are trapped on a desert island and trying to get some food out of a tin, Rudy says, "Make way for my six-million-dollar can opener".

In February 2016, Lindsay Wagner clarified in an interview with Headlines and Global News why the series that made her a star, unlike her "Six Million Dollar" counterpart, never revealed the final cost of The Bionic Woman. "That was a whole political thing wasn't it?" Wagner says. "She [Jaime] couldn't cost more than the man! They were going to make it more, but there was this whole political thing with the network because it was the beginning of the feminine revolution". Thus, ultimately the cost of Jaime Sommers' bionic implants was never revealed and deemed classified information in the opening credits.

== Character history ==
=== Before bionics ===
Born on August 18, 1948, Jaime is the daughter of James and Ann Sommers. Jaime was raised in Ojai, California, and she showed high potential in tennis. Her parents were college political-science professors. Unbeknownst to Jaime, they also worked undercover for the United States government. Both were killed (presumably murdered) in a car accident on April 16, 1966. Long-time family friends Jim and Helen Elgin became the 17-year-old Jaime's legal guardians. Helen's son, Steve Austin, and Jaime became high school sweethearts, but he left Ojai to go to college and later to join the U.S. Air Force, and the NASA space program as an astronaut.

Jaime graduated from high school and went on to study education at Carnegie Tech. Tennis—and not education—was her first career. After receiving her teaching degree, Jaime became a professional tennis player. By 1975, she had won many major tournaments and was ranked among the top-five female tennis players in the world. According to the pilot, "Welcome Home, Jaime", she has both beaten and been beaten by the real-life tennis stars Billie Jean King and Chris Evert.

=== Accident ===
On a visit home to Ojai, Jaime is reunited with Steve Austin (now a colonel and former astronaut). With some matchmaking from Steve's mother, Jaime and Steve's relationship quickly blossoms, but their happiness is replaced by tragedy when the couple go skydiving. Jaime's parachute rips, and she plummets to the ground. Her injuries are critical; both legs and her right arm are crushed beyond repair. Severe head trauma also causes damage to her right ear. Steve, who is deeply in love with Jaime, contacts his boss Oscar Goldman at the Office of Strategic Intelligence (OSI) and pleads with him until he authorizes a top-secret procedure—bionic replacement. Steve knows it is the only way to save Jaime, because the government performed the same experimental operation on him two years earlier. Under the skilled hands of Dr. Rudy Wells, Jaime's surgery is a success. Her badly damaged arm, legs, and inner ear are replaced with state-of-the-art electronic prostheses. Upon learning of the radical surgery performed on her, Jaime is fearful of being a freak. However, with Steve's support, she soon learns to accept her new limbs after he reveals that he is bionic, too. As they are in the midst of planning their wedding, Jaime's body rejects her bionics. Emergency surgery is fruitless, and with Steve by her side, Jaime dies on the operating table.

=== Life after death ===
Jaime's life does not end here. Dr. Michael Marchetti uses an experimental cryogenic procedure to cool her body and prevent cellular damage. This gives the doctors time to repair the massive cerebral clot which had ended her life. Her heart is restarted, and she is revived. However, the radical operation is not a complete success. Jaime suffers brain damage, and the memories of her past life are lost. Another surgery restores many of her memories, but her love for Steve seems unrecoverable.

Jaime's extraordinary strength rules out a return to the tennis circuit, so she returns to Ojai. She moves into a coach house apartment situated on Jim and Helen Elgin's ranch. Since her bionic implants represent an unfair advantage in her sport, Jaime lands a job teaching school at the Ventura Air Force Base. Jaime feels indebted to Oscar and the government for saving her life, and she insists that Oscar contact her if the OSI should need an agent with her special abilities.

Oscar does call on Jaime, and from 1976 through 1978 she is sent on numerous covert missions, most notably against her most notorious foes, the Fembots. However, Oscar's use of Jaime is considerably more reserved than his use of Steve. Whereas Austin is a full-time agent, Oscar is generally more reluctant to put Jaime into high-risk situations. She is often seen interjecting herself into missions over Oscar's objections. This hesitancy stems from several sources. At least initially, he accepts some of the blame for her death because he sent her out on a mission immediately after her bionic implant operation, using her as an agent before she was really ready. After her rebirth, he is loath to make the same mistake, since, after all, she had died from bionic rejection. Even when resurrected, her memory was not intact. Had she been a regular, non-bionic field agent, her mental issues would have disqualified her from being an agent. As Jaime and Oscar grow to form a working relationship, he exhibits paternalistic feelings for her which sometimes prevent a detached analysis of her suitability for missions.

During her time of most intense involvement with the OSI, her relationship with Rudy Wells is also different from Steve's. Whereas Steve is occasionally distrustful of Rudy, and sometimes shows impatience with, or even hostility to Rudy's medical tests, Jaime views him as a helpful ally and a good friend from the moment of her resurrection. She is frequently in and around Rudy's lab, and generally more enthusiastic about the research obligations of being a virtually unique specimen.

As her experience in the field develops, Jaime herself becomes increasingly self-assured. Her personality is more mercurial than Steve's, at once quick-witted and morally serious. After the trauma of rejection, Jaime's relationship to her bionics remains ambiguous. But as an operative she is courageous, resourceful with her abilities and increasingly circumspect about the militarism of her employers, preferring a more humanistic approach. Late in the series she adopts Maximillion (AKA Max), a German Shepherd dog that had been used as a test case for implanting bionics into animals.

== Vital statistics ==
When hackers hack into the government computer system in episode 48 ("All for One"), Jaime's OSI agent profile lists her height at 5'9" and weight as 131 lbs.

== Personal life ==
Eventually, Jaime becomes romantically involved with fellow OSI agent Chris Williams, and she yearns for a life of her own away from the government and the constant peril of undercover work. Feeling that she has repaid her debt to the government, Jaime resigns from the OSI. However, the powers that be are not prepared to let her go. Jaime realizes that her bionics have become a permanent part of her life, but they do not have to rule her or the life she wants to live. She returns to the OSI and agrees to take occasional missions on the condition that she is free to pursue her life.

Jaime and Chris continue their relationship and become very happy together. After years away from the OSI, Jaime accepts a mission. She travels to Budapest with Chris, but the two of them are separated. After Jaime is caught in an explosion, she is rescued and hospitalized back in the US. When she recovers from the concussion, she starts to remember her past life and feelings for Steve. She also learns the shocking news that Chris had been held captive and killed.

She acts on neither of these revelations, but instead returns to her life working as a therapist at the Los Angeles Rehabilitation Center. In 1987, after nearly 10 years with no contact, Jaime unexpectedly reunites with Steve Austin. Steve had left the OSI and had been enjoying life away from the government by running a charter boat. They meet in a restaurant where Steve was meeting his estranged son. Trying desperately to avoid being seen by him, she nevertheless is confronted by Steve, who finds himself being thrown through the restaurant window by Jaime. The couple come to terms with their years of separation and decide to see if they could rebuild their relationship.

Jaime and Steve occasionally return to the OSI in times of international crisis. Their time together prove that the love they once felt for each other has never died, and in 1989, the couple become engaged. During the five years that follow, Jaime becomes a doctor. She moves to Washington, DC, and establishes a family-counseling practice. Her experience with the government and her top secret clearance also open the door for her to help government agents. A computer virus, however, corrupts Jaime's bionic systems. Dr. Wells informs Steve that "she may never be bionic again", but Steve's main concern is he wants her alive above all else. She undergoes a major upgrade, which not only increases the power of her bionics, but also gives her night vision. On September 4, 1994, Dr. Jaime Sommers and Col. Steve Austin marry. At the ceremony, Rudy Wells gives Jaime away, and Oscar is Steve's best man.

== In literature and culture ==
Unlike Steve Austin, Jaime Sommers did not appear in the 1972 novel Cyborg, the original story which started the first series. She was entirely a television invention of Kenneth Johnson, a writer of The Six Million Dollar Man, under the supervision of executive producer Harve Bennett. Sommers' only literary appearances to date have been in two novelizations of televised episodes released in the mid-1970s; Caidin had already concluded his series of Cyborg novels by the time her character was established on television.

Johnson named Sommers after a water skier he met while producing whale shows at SeaWorld. The name "Jaime" was predominantly a male name (a derivative of "James") before the television series began. It is probably not a coincidence that in 1976 the name Jaime became one of the 100 most popular names of the year in every one of the 50 US states. The female name Jamie (a variant spelling) also gained enormous popularity at the same time.

== Remake ==
In 2007, NBC launched a reimagined Bionic Woman. Very few elements of the original series were kept, except for the first and last names of the main character. In the remake, Jaime's full name was Jaime Wells Sommers, a homage to the earlier series' character Dr. Rudy Wells.

In the series, the new version of the "Bionic Woman" had the same basic bionic parts as the 1970s model. However, Jaime version 2.0 also received a bionic right eye (a bionic component previously associated with the original Steve Austin). As in the earlier series, Ms. Sommers was not the first bionic person. Her predecessor was the bionic woman Sarah Corvus (played by Katee Sackhoff).

NBC aggressively promoted the series Bionic Woman. The weekly remake drew large initial audiences. The series went on hiatus when most of US entertainment was halted due to the 2007–08 writer's strike. The strike, coupled with diminishing ratings, led NBC to cancel the show after production of eight episodes.

== See also ==
- List of female action heroes
