= Office of Scientific Intelligence =

Former department of the Central Intelligence Agency

Office of Scientific Intelligence (OSI) also known as Scientific Intelligence Division, was a department of the Central Intelligence Agency. In 1963, it was incorporated into the Directorate of Science & Technology.

== Fictional uses of the name ==
The "Office of Scientific Intelligence" is the name for a fictional secret intelligence branch of the American government featured in the 1970s TV series The Six Million Dollar Man and The Bionic Woman. The acronym OSI (Office of Secret Intelligence) is used in the cartoon The Venture Bros. The name is also used in The Puppet Masters. A variant name, the "Department of Scientific Intelligence" (DSI), aka "The Shop", is used in the Stephen King movies Firestarter, The Golden Years and The Lawnmower Man.

== See also ==
- Project MKUltra
