= Michael Sloan =

American freelance illustrator

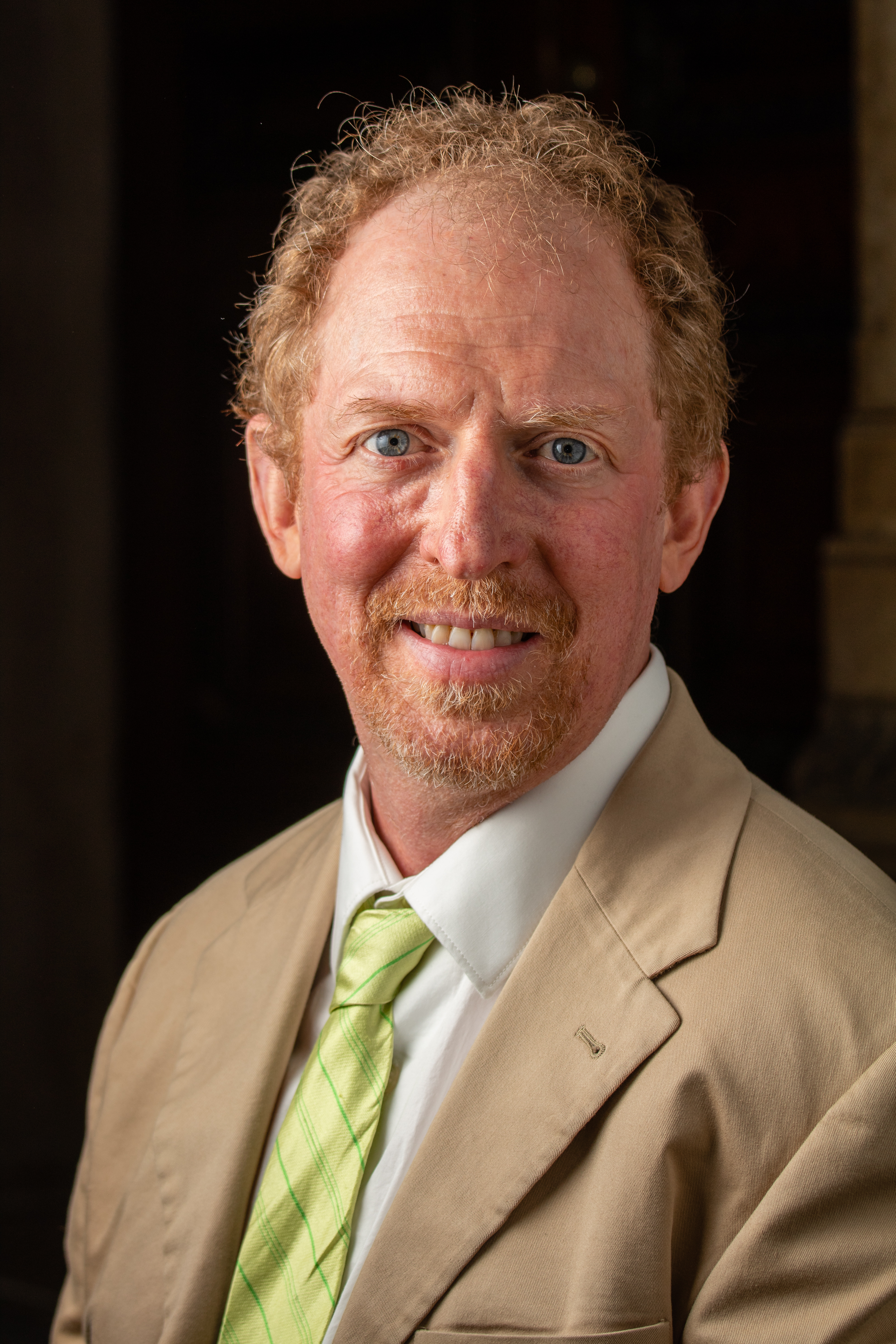
- Sloan at the 2018 Pulitzer Prizes
- Education: Rhode Island School of Design
- Occupations: Illustrator, cartoonist, musician
- Notable work: Separation, Welcome to the New World, The Zen of Nimbus comic, the music album Baldwin.
- Website: Official website

Michael Sloan is an American freelance illustrator. In 2018, he won the Pulitzer Prize for Editorial Cartooning along with Jake Halpern, for their comic Welcome to the New World. In 2020, Halpern and Sloan published a graphic novel under the same name.

Sloan is also a musician, composer, and recording artist. He has produced over 300 albums in a wide variety of musical styles, mostly instrumental and guitar-based. Many of his albums are named after people and places that have had a profound influence on his work. He designs and creates the artwork for his album covers.

Many of Michael’s albums (i.e. “The Odyssey,” “The Trojan War,” “The Bayeux Tapestry”) are musical narratives, and are often operatic. There is a parallel between these albums and his graphic narrative work such as the “Separation” comic, and his “Zen of Nimbus” graphic novels.

After graduating from the Rhode Island School of Design, Michael worked as a printmaker in Paris and Venice before moving to New York City where he began his career as an illustrator. His first published assignment appeared on the New York Times Op-Ed page. Since then his artwork has been published by many newspapers and magazines including the Washington Post, the Wall Street Journal, the Boston Globe, The New Yorker, and over 100 times in the New York Times Op-Ed Letters column. Michael’s work has been awarded three silver medals from The Society of Illustrators in NYC, and has appeared frequently in American Illustration and the Communication Arts Illustration Annual. For many years he performed with the all-illustrators jazz band The Half-Tones at the Society of Illustrators in New York City.

Michael has lectured at many institutions and organizations such as the University of Connecticut, Hong Kong University, Yale Law School, Yale Jackson School of Global Affairs, and Massachusetts College of Art and Design. He is an associate fellow at the Ezra Stiles College of Yale University. He has taught illustration at the University of Connecticut and the Rhode Island School of Design.

Michael spent a year with his family living and working in Hong Kong, where he created a series of paintings of traditional street markets. He has shown these paintings in solo exhibits in the United States and Hong Kong.

Sloan and author Jake Halpern created Welcome to the New World, a comic strip series for the New York Times about a refugee family who fled the civil war in Syria to make a new life in America. Michael and Jake were awarded the 2018 Pulitzer Prize in editorial cartooning for Welcome to the New World. A graphic novel based on the comic was published in September, 2020.

Sloan and Halpern continued their collaboration in 2025 with the creation of Separation, a comic strip series for the New York Times about a Honduran family living in New York City that is seeking asylum and faces the risk of deportation.

He is a member of PEN America, the Lute Society of America, and the Society of Illustrators.

== Illustrations ==
- Zen of Nimbus
- Nimbus and the Amazing Spectacles (2004)
- The Heresy of Nimbus (2006)
- The Redemption of Nimbus
- Welcome to the New World. (2020)

== Music: albums (selection) ==
- Baldwin (2024)
- Matisse (2024)
- Michelle Obama (2024)
- Steinbeck (2024)
