= High Noon (2000 film) =

2000 TV film

- Original poster
- Based on: High Noon by Carl Foreman; "The Tin Star" by John W. Cunningham
- Screenplay by: Carl Foreman; T. S. Cook
- Directed by: Rod Hardy
- Starring: Tom Skerritt; Susanna Thompson; Reed Diamond; María Conchita Alonso; Dennis Weaver; August Schellenberg; Michael Madsen
- Music by: Allyn Ferguson
- Country of origin: United States
- Original language: English

Production
- Executive producer: David A. Rosemont
- Producer: Ted Bauman
- Production location: Calgary
- Cinematography: Robert McLachlan
- Editor: Michael D. Ornstein
- Running time: 88 minutes
- Production company: Rosemont Productions International

Original release
- Network: TBS
- Release: August 20, 2000

High Noon is a 2000 American Western television film directed by Rod Hardy and written by Carl Foreman and T. S. Cook. It is a remake of the 1952 film High Noon, also written by Foreman, itself based on the 1947 Collier's magazine short story "The Tin Star" by John W. Cunningham. The film stars Tom Skerritt, Susanna Thompson, Reed Diamond, María Conchita Alonso, Dennis Weaver, August Schellenberg and Michael Madsen. The film premiered on TBS on August 20, 2000.

== Plot ==
Variety noted that the plot had only minor changes from the original film:

In the late 1890s, Will Kane is the chief marshal of Hadleyville, a small town in the New Mexico Territory; even though all of his deputies have resigned, Kane continues to serve due to his strong sense of duty. His new wife, Amy, is a Quaker and pacifist who deplores violence. At her urging, Kane decides to retire and become a farmer.

However, Kane then learns that Frank Miller, a gunfighter and killer he brought to justice years ago, has been pardoned and will arrive in Hadleyville on the noon train. Miller's old gang has returned to join him, and a message arrives stating that his first order of business will be to murder Kane as revenge for his conviction.

Kane reaches out to his former deputies for help, but all of them refuse, either out of fear of Miller or because Kane's integrity renders him unwilling to give them special treatment. He then tries forming a posse, but the townspeople are even less willing to fight alongside him. Some are sympathetic to Miller as his notoriety made the town famous and they blame Kane for ruining a good thing, while others argue that dealing with him isn't their problem. Several residents do volunteer anyway, but Kane is forced to turn them away as they are either too young, old, or physically unfit to fight.

A desperate Kane turns to his friend, Judge Mettrick, for advice; Mettrick (who has already resigned) simply tells him to leave town as he originally planned to. Unwilling to abandon his post, Kane decides to face Miller and his gang alone. Amy, who had threatened to leave on the noon train with or without Kane, returns and saves him by shooting one of Miller's men in the back. Kane finally guns his nemesis down after he tries to threaten Amy. After Miller's death, the town people come out to congratulate and thank Kane. Without saying a word, he throws his marshal's badge in the dirt and rides away.

== Cast ==
- Tom Skerritt as Will Kane
- Susanna Thompson as Amy Kane
- Reed Diamond as Harvey Pell
- María Conchita Alonso as Helen Ramirez
- Dennis Weaver as Mart Howe
- August Schellenberg as Antonio
- Michael Madsen as Frank Miller
- Matthew Walker as Judge Mettrick
- Frank C. Turner as Station Master
- Shaun Johnston as Joe Henderson
- Terry King as Henry Munchhausen
- Kate Newby as Janet Munchhausen
- David LeReaney as Sam Beattie
- Noel Fisher as Billy
- Joe Norman Shaw as Dave Cleaver
- Trevor Leigh as Pete Cleaver
- Colin A. Campbell as Jordan
- Jim Leyden as Simpson
- Stephen Eric McIntyre as Pierce
- Jim Shield as Colby
- Royal Sproule as Liam
- Tom McBeath as Rudy
- Jacqueline Robbins as Jane
- Joyce Robbins as Hannah
- Judith Buchan as Glenda Beattie

== Production ==
Filming took place in Calgary, and lasted for 19 days.
