= Will Kane =

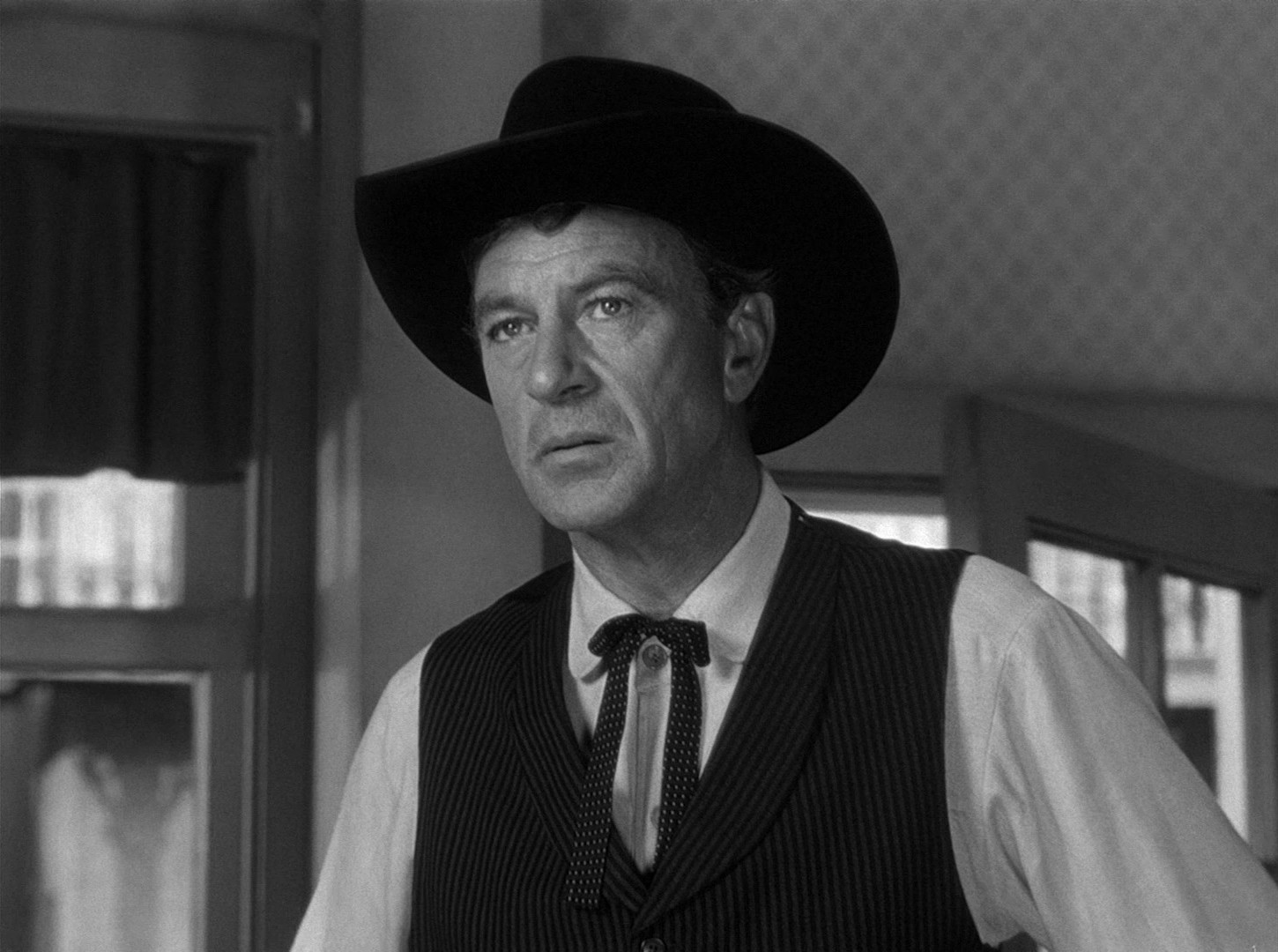
- Gary Cooper as Marshal Will Kane in High Noon
- First appearance: High Noon
- Portrayed by: Gary Cooper (1952); Lee Majors (1980); Tom Skerritt (2000)

In-universe information
- Gender: Male
- Occupation: Town Marshal (retired)
- Spouse: Amy Flower Kane (wife)
- Children: Will Kane Jr. (son)
- Religion: Episcopalian
- Nationality: American

William "Will" Kane is the protagonist of the film High Noon (1952). He was first played by Gary Cooper, then by Lee Majors in High Noon, Part II: The Return of Will Kane (1980), and by Tom Skerritt in High Noon (2000), a remake for cable television.

== Appearances ==
Gary Cooper originated the character in High Noon in 1952. Cooper briefly reprised his High Noon role in an uncredited cameo appearance in the 1959 Bob Hope comedy Alias Jesse James. Lee Majors took over the role for in a made-for-TV sequel, High Noon, Part II: The Return of Will Kane (1980). Tom Skerritt played Kane in a 2000 remake of High Noon for the US cable channel TBS.

== Fictional biography ==
In High Noon, Will Kane is a town marshal of the fictional Hadleyville, New Mexico Territory. It is both his wedding day and his last day as a marshal. He is about to leave town with his bride, Amy, to start a new life as a store clerk when the clerk of the telegraph office brings bad news: a man he sent to prison some years earlier, Frank Miller, has been released from prison and is arriving on the noon train. Kane, and the townsfolk who remember Miller, know Miller's visit is for one reason: revenge. Upon his conviction years earlier, Miller swore he would kill Will Kane. Kane's friends tell him to leave town, which he does briefly, but he feels that running away is not a solution, so he returns to face Miller and the gang. Will tries to find support from his friends and others, but none wants to help - they all tell him to leave town or offer reasons why they can't (or won't) help. Will chooses to stand up against this gang alone, even though it could result in his own death. After a brief gun fight in town, Kane kills three of the four men, while Amy also saves his life by giving up her pacifist religion to kill one of the men. As townspeople come out to offer congratulations, Kane takes off his tin star and throws it in the dirt. The film ends with Kane and his bride driving out of town to destinations unknown.

In High Noon, Part II: The Return of Will Kane, Kane returns to the town of Hadleyville, a year after the events of High Noon, and finds that the town is now in the hands of a corrupt marshal and his two aides. J.D. Ward, the man that replaced Kane as marshal, is a tyrant who shoots up the horses Will has just purchased. Ward is after Ben Irons and his men in order to get the bounty on them, even though Ward knows they are innocent. Ben gets away. Ward pursues him, and Kane decides to help Ben. Ben dies from a gunshot wound. Ward is going to arrest Kane for helping Ben, but the town rallies together and issues a warrant for Ward's arrest. Kane then again puts on the tin star and shoots Ward to death.

== Development ==
Despite the iconic portrayal of the character by Gary Cooper (see below), "Cooper was not producer Stanley Kramer's first choice to play Marshal Will Kane." Nevertheless, Will Kane is "one of Cooper's most famous roles." Lee Majors explained that he accepted the role in the sequel, because "I've always admired Gary Cooper. And I wanted to do a Western again." Ron Hardy, who directed the recent remake, argued that Tom Skerrit was an ideal actor to take over the role in the remake. Hardy explained that like "Cooper, he is Mr. Everyday. People know who Tom Skerritt is. They don't treat him like a superstar. They feel he's approachable."

== Reception ==
In 1952, Gary Cooper won a Golden Globe Award and his second Academy Award for his portrayal of Will Kane.

While The Washington Post refers to the character as "A Classic Role," Entertainment Weekly ranked the character fourteenth on its list of the top twenty "All-Time Coolest Heroes in Pop Culture" in April 2009. The magazine included him on its list because in "High Noon, Gary Cooper's retiring lawman faces down a killer and his goons despite being deserted by the rest of the town." Entertainment Weekly went on to cite his most heroic move as when "Kane's last ally gets cold feet, he tells him to go to his family, and then refuses the help of a teenager." Kane was also ranked by the American Film Institute as the fifth greatest movie hero of all time.

Nevertheless, although Cooper's performance has received considerable praise as indicated above, Majors and Skerritt's performances have not been so positively received. The New York Daily News referred to Lee Majors as "sadly miscast" as Kane in the sequel. Entertainment Weekly also contrasted Cooper with Skerritt to Skerritt's disadvantage. Reviewer Ken Tucker reminisces upon "the all-purpose image of Cooper that's taken hold in the popular imagination: the gaunt, chiseled stone face, a stoic deadpan that rendered Cooper the leading-man, romantic-actor equivalent of Buster Keaton....By contrast, Skerritt saunters through the new Noon as if he were still the easygoing, ironic lawman of Picket Fences."
