= Mina.Minerva =

MINA.MINERVA is a 2013 short Canadian comedy written and directed by Marshall Axani, based on the story by Diana Donaldson and Marshall Axani. The film stars Jacqueline Robbins, Joyce Robbins, Jennifer Spence, Lori Triolo, Fabiola Colmenero, Mackenzie Gray and Eliza Smith. It was produced by Allude Entertainment.

== Plot ==
MINA.MINERVA is a journey through the tumultuous relationship of two very feisty twins. When a petty argument nearly pushes sixty-five-year-old identical twin sisters Mina and Minerva to fisticuffs, decades of unaired baggage threatens to implode their already strained relationship.

== Cast ==
- Jacqueline Robbins as Mina
- Joyce Robbins as Minerva
- Jennifer Spence as Robyn
- Lori Triolo as Divinity
- Fabiola Colmenero as Bev
- Mackenzie Gray as Emotional Man
- Eliza Smith as Stagette Queen

== Awards and nominations ==
Calgary International Film Festival 2015:

- Best Short Film Nomination

Leo Awards 2015:

- Best Sound Design Nomination

Cold Reading Series 2013:

- Best Short Screenplay
