= The Florida Connection =

The Florida Connection, also known as Weed, is a 1978 film starring former NFL player Dan Pastorini and his Playboy model and actress wife June Wilkinson. It was her first film after a ten-year hiatus. The film is a "violent drug-smuggling tale."

Maury Cramer wrote and produced the film with director Robert J. Emery. The movie is set in Florida's swamps.

Jack L. Richards was the director of photography

The film is about drug smugglers, corrupt police, and officers of the U.S. Treasury. Wilkinson portrays a charter pilot helping a drug smuggler. The film includes scenes with air boats, dog racing, chases, shoot-outs, a drunk, and features fashions of the 1970s.

Pastorini said that he felt good about his acting until watching the film and then cringed at his stilted delivery.

Variety's Complete Home Video Directory described the film as "Adventures take place in the drug-trafficking corner of the Keys."

== Cast ==
- Dan Pastorini
- June Wilkinson
- Frank Logan
- Ed Faulkner as Mule Tucker
- Jim Bruce
- Bill Thurman
- Bob Leslie
- Doug Lance
- Mal Jones
- Otis Sistrunk
