= Macumba Love =

1960 film by Douglas Fowley

- Theatrical release poster
- Directed by: Douglas Fowley
- Screenplay by: Norman Graham
- Story by: Norman Graham
- Produced by: Steve Barclay; Milton J. Brescia; Douglas Fowley
- Starring: Walter Reed; Ziva Rodann; William Wellman Jr. June Wilkinson; Ruth de Souza
- Cinematography: Sam Burket; Rudolf Icsey; Rudolpho Lesey
- Edited by: Herman Hoffmann
- Music by: Enrico Simonetti
- Production companies: Allied Enterprises; Barclay Films International; Brinter Films
- Distributed by: United Artists
- Release date: June 1960
- Running time: 86 minutes
- Country: United States
- Language: English

Macumba Love is a 1960 American adventure horror film directed and co-produced by Douglas Fowley and written by Norman Graham. The film stars Walter Reed, Ziva Rodann, William Wellman Jr., June Wilkinson and Ruth de Souza. The film centers on a writer who arrives on a South American island in order to finish his book on cult beliefs only to find that the local Voodoo Queen has other plans for him.

== Plot ==
J. Peter Wells, an exposé writer, arrives on an island off the coast of South America, to complete a book on voodoo, ju-ju, macumba, mojo and other cult beliefs, which he believes are responsible for unsolved murders on this island. Wealthy landowner Venis de Vias warns him against stirring up the natives, especially any efforts to lessen the prestige of the reigning Voodoo Queen Mama Rata-loi. The arrival of Wells' daughter, Sara, and her husband, Warren, on a honeymoon trip, starts the pot boiling and making the natives restless, along with Queen Mama Rata-loi, who wants Warren and his friends (including Peter) to satisfy her own sexual appetite and blood lust.

== Cast ==
- Walter Reed as J. Peter Weils
- Ziva Rodann as Venus de Viasa
- William Wellman Jr. as Warren
- June Wilkinson as Sara
- Ruth de Souza as Mama Rata-loi
- Pedro Paulo Hatheyer as Insp. Escoberto
- Cléa Simões as Symanthemum

== Reception ==
On his website Fantastic Movie Musings and Ramblings, Dave Sindelar noted the film's lively score, effective voodoo sequences and shock moments, but criticized the film's acting as "uneven". TV Guide awarded the film one out of five stars, offering similar criticism towards the film's acting, calling the film "Fairly tedious".
