= Mackenzie Gray =

Canadian actor (born 1957)

- Born: Alexander Mackenzie Gray; 22 November 1957 (age 68); Toronto, Ontario, Canada
- Citizenship: United Kingdom; Canada
- Occupation: Actor
- Years active: 1983-present

Alexander Mackenzie Gray (born 22 November 1957) is a Canadian actor. He is a dual citizen of the United Kingdom and Canada.

== Life and career ==
Gray was born in Toronto. After studying and working in London, UK, he completed his training at the University of Toronto. He performed in independent films in the UK, but his first North American feature film was The Wars in 1983. A professional actor for over 30 years, he has worked on stage numerous times in Britain, Canada and the United States. He has also appeared in over 130 films and television shows and was a series lead on a major US network. Gray has also done voiceover work for animated series, documentaries and video games. In addition to performing, Gray is a director, writer and producer in film and theatre. He wrote vignettes and "shorts" for several episodes of Sesame Street from 1984 to 1986.

Gray also has a musical background. He was the lead singer and rhythm guitarist of the Toronto rock band The Fridge Stickers. Mackenzie has composed and recorded many songs, incidental music and scores for films, TV shows and web features. In 2008, he co-produced the award-winning feature film Poe: Last Days of The Raven. He taught Film History at The Art Institute of Vancouver for 5 years and teaches Acting for Film at The University of British Columbia. He was a sitting member of the board of directors of the Academy of Canadian Cinema and Television for 4 years, as well as a voting member. He also served on the Western Gemini 2006 Committee for that year's Gemini Awards.

Gray has appeared multiple times in Superman media, including twice in the television series Smallville, notably as an older clone of Lex Luthor; and as Kryptonian scientist Jax-Ur in Man of Steel. He played Fangtom in the 2011 animated series Ninjago: Masters of Spinjitzu, and also took the lead role of Dr. Hitz in the 2016 short film 2BR02B: To Be or Naught to Be based on the short story by Kurt Vonnegut. He also provided the voice for the main villain, Gramorr, in the first two seasons of LoliRock. Gray also appeared in the 2011 horror film Grave Encounters. In 2016, Gray portrayed Lux Dujour in Dirk Gently's Holistic Detective Agency. In 2017, Gray voiced Dandy Grandeur in the My Little Pony: Friendship Is Magic season seven episode "Fluttershy Leans In". He currently portrays Walter / The Eye on the FX television series Legion.

== Filmography ==
=== Film ===
Mackenzie Gray film credits
Year	Title	Role	Notes
1994	Replikator	Candor	
1995	Johnny Shortwave	Performer (voice)	
1997	2103: The Deadly Wake	Nigel Chan	
1997	Falling Fire	Joe Schneider	
1997	Strip Search	Lawrence Durrell	
1997	My Teacher Ate My Homework	The Reaper	
1998	Shepherd	Lyndon	
1999	Shepherd II	Lyndon / Alter Lyndon	
2002	Groove Squad	Dr. Nathaniel Nightingale (voice)	Direct-to-video
2003	Ben Hur	Rabbi (voice)	Direct-to-video
2003	The Hitcher II: I've Been Waiting	Lieutenant	Direct-to-video
2004	Lucky Stars	Dr. Brown	
2004	Part of the Game	Dale	
2005	Ark	Rabble Rouser (voice)	
2006	Tony Hawk in Boom Boom Sabotage	Marshall / Boris / Stilt Walker / Floor Worker (voice)	Direct-to-video
2007	Shooter	Dave Simmons	
2008	Poe: Last Days of the Raven	John Allan / Old Man	
2008	Mothers & Daughters	Book Launch Host	
2008	Joy Ride 2: Dead Ahead	Bartender	Direct-to-video
2009	Barbie: Thumbelina	Rick (voice)	Direct-to-video
2009	The Imaginarium of Doctor Parnassus	First Monk	
2010	Hard Ride to Hell	Crowley	Direct-to-video
2010	Messages Deleted	Director	
2011	Grave Encounters	Houston Gray	
2011	Citizen 101	Preacher	
2013	Man of Steel	Jax-Ur	
2013	Metallica: Through the Never	Tall Man	
2014	Barbie and the Secret Door	Father (voice)	Direct-to-video
2016	Warcraft	Lordaerian Delegate	
2017	Entanglement	Street Photographer	
2017	Runaway Christmas Bride	Travis Paulson	
2017	Heart of Clay	Nicholas Miles Adew	
2018	Violentia	Senator Edward Frost	
2018	The Prodigal Dad	Sidney	
2019	Rabid	Gunter	
2019	A Winter Princess	Kristof	
2021	Ditched	Caine	
2024	Festival of the Living Dead	EMT Barclay	

=== Television ===
Mackenzie Gray television credits
Year	Title	Role	Notes
1993	Counterstrike	Lord Eames	Episode: "Peacemaker" (S3.E20)
1999-2000	So Weird	John Kane	2 episodes
2002	Beyond Belief: Fact or Fiction	Nathaniel Bourke	
2006, 2010	Smallville	Dr. Alistair Kreig, Lex Luthor (LX-13)	2 episodes
2009–2012	Iron Man: Armored Adventures	Obadiah Stane (voice)	Recurring role
2012	Ninjago: Masters of Spinjitzu	Mystaké / Fangtom / Museum Curator (voice)	
2013	Spooksville	Mr. Spiney	3 episodes
2014	Bitten	Jimmy Koenig	Episode: "Vengeance" (S1.E9)
2014–2017	LoliRock	Lord Gramorr (voice)	52 episodes
2016	Legends of Tomorrow	Time Master	2 episodes
2016	Dirk Gently's Holistic Detective Agency	Lux Dujour	Episode: "Rogue Wall Enthusiasts" (S1.E3)
2017	Legion	Walter / The Eye	Recurring role (Season 1); 8 episodes
2017	Supergirl	Greggor	Episode: "Crisis on Earth-X: Part One" (S3.E8)
2017–2018	Riverdale	Dr. Curdle	3 episodes
2023–2024	Ninjago: Dragons Rising	Dorama (voice)	
2024	Private Princess Christmas	Uncle Felix	

=== Short films ===
Mackenzie Gray short film credits
Year	Title	Role	Notes
1997	The Cellar	Mr. Friendly	
2000	Legs Apart	Doctor	
2000	The Artist's Circle		
2003	Therapy	Dr. Alex Manning	
2004	Adolescent Nation	Windsor (leader of the tired)	
2005	Say Yes	The Bartender	
2005	Laundry Day	Haunting Man	
2005	The Veil	The Husband	
2005	The Road That Binds Us	Donald	
2006	Till Death Do You Part	Walter Devlin	
2006	Memories: A Writer's Confession	John Carter	
2008	Under Pressure: A Story of Microscopic Stakes	Dr. Allen	
2008	A Zombie Musical		
2010	Tunnel	Man on the Lawn	
2010	Senseless	Edgar	
2011	While I Breathe	Boss	
2011	Mulligan's Run	Mulligan (voice)	
2012	Fred & Ginger	Fred	
2012	The Vessel	Torin	
2012	Now and Forever	Male TV Voice	
2013	Under the Bridge of Fear	Jervis Pender - Pool Shark	Also writer and director
2013	Citizen 101: The Religion of Consumerism	Preacher	
2014	Unlikely Ally	German SS Leader - Special Guest Appearance	
2014	Earthlickers	Sheriff	
2014	Mina.Minerva	Cemetery Patron	
2015	I Wanna Date U	Ted	
2015	The Wolf Who Came to Dinner	The Vampire	
2015	The Twisted Slipper	Le Duke	
2015	The Starlight Heist	Allan Swan	
2015	Disappeared	Wes	
2016	Grocery Store Action Movie	Limey	
2016	2BR02B: To Be or Naught to Be	Dr. Hitz	
2017	The Catch	Peter	
2017	The Basement	Dad	
2018	Eden	The Mad Man	
2018	Saint Playtrix Day	Liam O Murchu	
2021	Belief	Belial (voice)	

== Awards and nominations ==
Gray has won 3 Leo awards and been nominated for one on 16 other occasions.

Year	Award	Category	Work	Result	Refs
1999	Leo Awards	Best Performance by a Male: Dramatic Series	Welcome to Paradox, episode: "Acute Triangle"	Nominated	
2000	Leo Awards	Best Performance by a Male: Dramatic Series	So Weird, episode: "Transplant"	Nominated	
2002	Leo Awards	Best Supporting Performance by a Male: Feature Length Drama	Voyage of the Unicorn	Nominated	
2002	Leo Awards	Best Performance or Host(s): Music, Comedy, or Variety Program or Series	Big Sound, episode: "There's a Rockstar in Your Office"	Nominated	
2004	Leo Awards	Best Guest Performance by a Male: Dramatic Series	The Collector, episode: "The Rapper"	Nominated	
2011	Leo Awards	Best Guest Performance by a Male: Dramatic Series	Smallville, episode: "Lazarus"	Nominated	
2012	Leo Awards	Best Performance: Youth or Children's Program or Series	R.L. Stine's The Haunting Hour, episode: "Brush With Madness"	Nominated	
2012	Leo Awards	Best Supporting Performance by a Male: Dramatic Series	Alcatraz, episode: "Kit Carson"	Nominated	
2014	Leo Awards	Best Short Drama	Under The Bridge Of Fear	Nominated	
2014	Leo Awards	Best Screenwriting: Short Drama	Under The Bridge Of Fear	Nominated	
2014	Leo Awards	Best Direction: Short Drama	Under The Bridge Of Fear	Nominated	
2014	Leo Awards	Best Performance: Youth or Children's Program or Series	Spooksville, episode: "The Dark Corner"	Won	
2014	Leo Awards	Best Guest Performance by a Male: Dramatic Series	Bitten, episode: "Vengeance"	Won	
2015	Leo Awards	Best Costume Design: Short Drama	Earthlickers	Nominated	
2016	Leo Awards	Best Supporting Performance by a Male: Television Movie	If There Be Thorns	Nominated	
2017	Leo Awards	Best Guest Performance by a Male: Dramatic Series	Dirk Gently's Holistic Detective Agency, episode: "Rogue Wall Enthusiasts"	Won	
2018	Leo Awards	Best Supporting Performance by a Male: Dramatic Series	Legion, episode: "Chapter 6"	Nominated	
2020	Leo Awards	Best Supporting Performance by a Male: Motion Picture	Rabid	Nominated	
2020	Leo Awards	Best Supporting Performance by a Male: Television Movie	A Winter Princess	Nominated	
