= Otis Sistrunk =

American football player (born 1946)

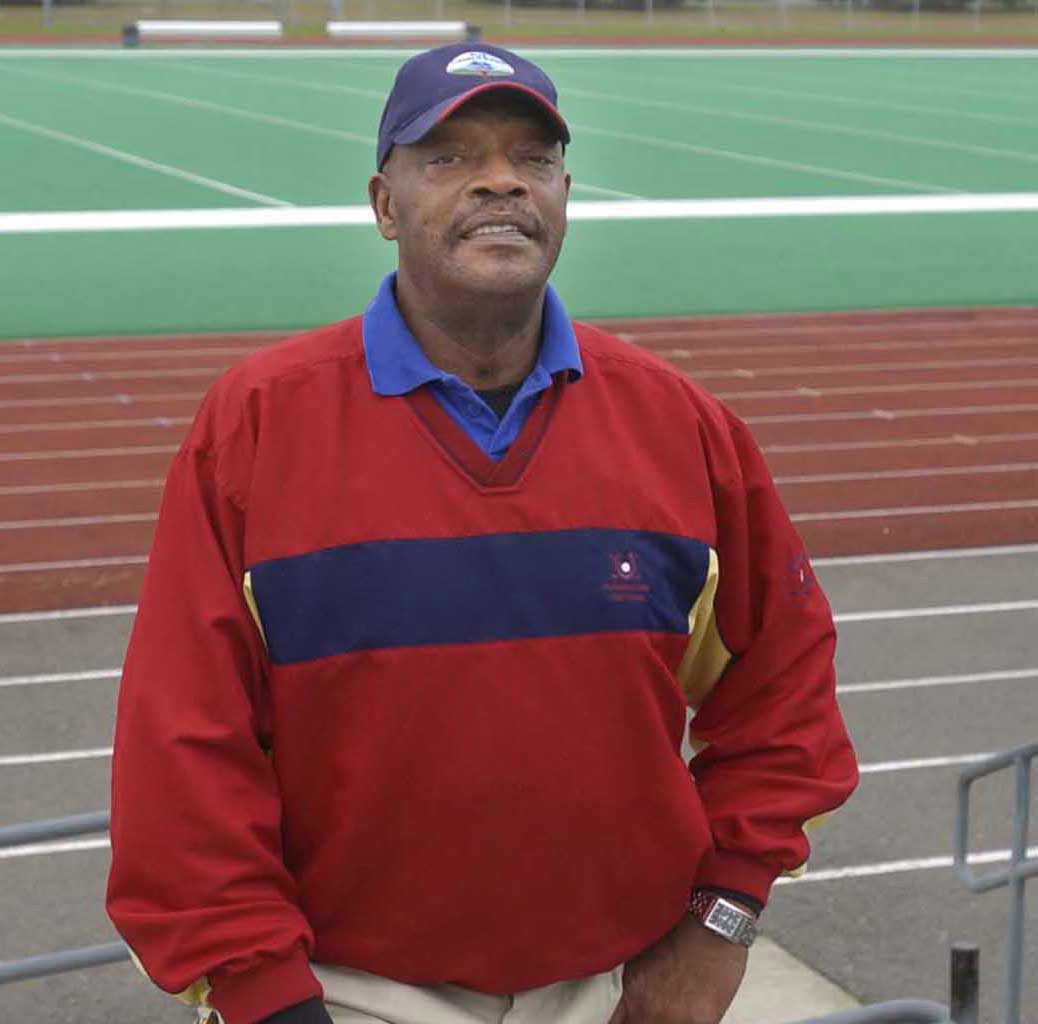
- Otis Sistrunk in January, 2005

No. 60
- Positions: Defensive tackle, Defensive end

Personal information
- Born: September 18, 1946 (age 80); Columbus, Georgia, U.S.
- Listed height: 6 ft 4 in (1.93 m)
- Listed weight: 265 lb (120 kg)

Career information
- High school: Spencer (Columbus)
- College: None
- NFL draft: 1972: undrafted

Career history
- Oakland Raiders (1972–1978)

Awards and highlights
- Super Bowl champion (XI); Second-team All-Pro (1974); Pro Bowl (1974)

Career NFL statistics
- Games played: 98
- Stats at Pro Football Reference

Otis Sistrunk (born September 18, 1946) is an American former professional football player who played his entire seven-year career as a defensive lineman for the Oakland Raiders of the National Football League (NFL), from 1972 to 1978. Sistrunk later became a professional wrestler in the National Wrestling Alliance (NWA) in 1981.

== Professional career ==
Sistrunk was born in Columbus, Georgia, and was one of the few NFL players of his day to not play college football, going directly from William H. Spencer High School in Columbus, Georgia, to the United States Marines. After leaving the military, the 21-year-old found work at a Milwaukee meat-packing plant and played two years of semi-pro football in the area for the West Allis Racers before joining the Norfolk Neptunes of the Continental Football League in 1969.

Sistrunk played three years for the Neptunes (the last two in the semi-pro Atlantic Coast Football League after the CPFL folded); in 1971, a Los Angeles Rams scout spotted Sistrunk and believed he could play in the NFL. During a team practice, he was observed by representatives of the Oakland Raiders, who brought Sistrunk to their team in 1972.

Otis Sistrunk was inducted into the American Football Association's Semi Pro Football Hall of Fame in 1982

=== "University of Mars" ===
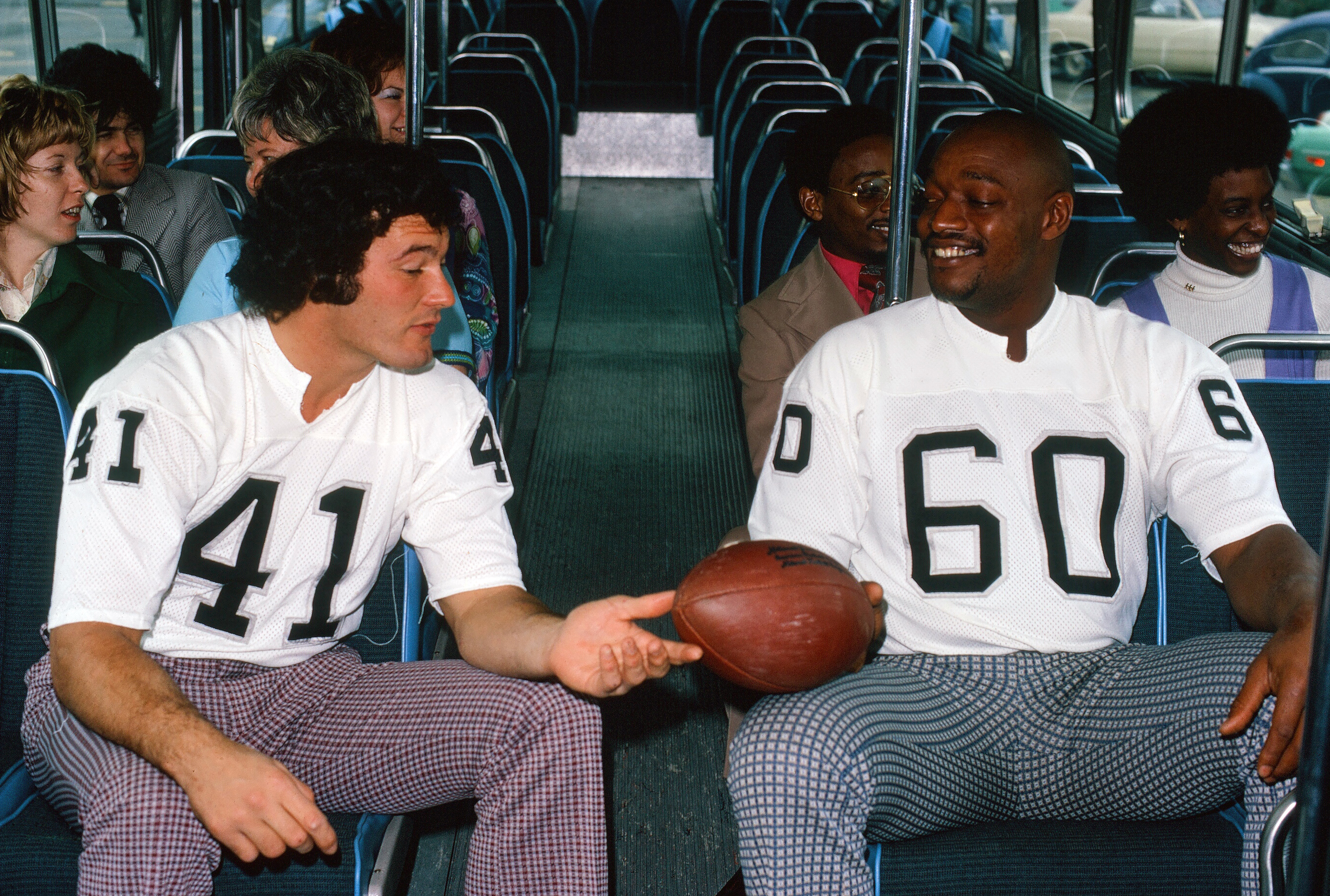
Sistrunk (60) and teammate Phil Villapiano (41) for local public transportation operator AC Transit's "Project Linebacker" anti-graffiti campaign, c. 1976.

During a Monday Night Football telecast, a television camera beamed a sideline shot of the 6'4", 265-pound Sistrunk's steaming bald head to the nation. That, along with the Raiders’ listing of his educational background in the team program as "U.S. Mars” (shorthand for United States Marine Corps), prompted ABC commentator and ex-NFL player Alex Karras to suggest that the extraterrestrial-looking Sistrunk's alma mater was the "University of Mars."

Sistrunk was named to the Pro Bowl in 1974. In 1976, playing under coach John Madden, Sistrunk was part of the Raiders team that won Super Bowl XI against the Minnesota Vikings. He retired after the 1978 season, finishing his career with seven fumbles recovered and three interceptions in 98 games played.

== Wrestling career ==
Sistrunk had a brief wrestling career in the National Wrestling Alliance. Following the breakup of the Fabulous Freebirds, Michael Hayes was in need of a partner and teamed up with Sistrunk. Together, they defeated Jimmy Snuka and Hayes' former tag team partner Terry Gordy to win the NWA Georgia Tag Team Championship on September 27, 1981. Sistrunk soon retired after deciding that he did not enjoy wrestling, however, and the title was vacated in late 1981.

=== Championships and accomplishments ===
- Georgia Championship Wrestling

- NWA Georgia Tag Team Championship (1 time) - with Michael Hayes

== Personal life ==
After leaving football, Sistrunk spent two years as a beer salesman. He was then approached about working with the Army as a civilian employee. He spent twelve years working at Fort Benning, Georgia. Sistrunk now manages Cowan Memorial Stadium at Joint Base Lewis-McChord, Washington and helps with athletic training programs.

He also had a brief movie career, appearing as a short-order cook in Car Wash (1976), in The Florida Connection, and in a non-sexual role (as a police officer) in Alex de Renzy's porn film Babyface (1977).

His nephew Caesar Rayford, was a defensive end for the Dallas Cowboys. He is a distant cousin to former NFL player Manny Sistrunk.

In 2022, the street on which Sistrunk lives was honorarily named after him by the City of Columbus, Georgia.

== See also ==
- List of gridiron football players who became professional wrestlers
