= High Noon, Part II: The Return of Will Kane =

1980 TV film

- Theatrical release poster
- Genre: Drama; Western
- Written by: Elmore Leonard
- Directed by: Jerry Jameson
- Starring: Lee Majors; David Carradine; Pernell Roberts
- Country of origin: United States
- Original language: English

Production
- Executive producers: Charles W. Fries; Malcolm Stuart
- Producer: Edward Montagne
- Cinematography: Harry J. May
- Editor: Lee Burch
- Running time: 96 minutes
- Production companies: Charles Fries Productions; Orion Television

Original release
- Release: November 15, 1980

High Noon, Part II: The Return of Will Kane is a 1980 American Western television film and a sequel to the classic 1952 film High Noon. It starred Lee Majors in the title role, as well as David Carradine and Pernell Roberts. It first aired on CBS on November 15, 1980, in a two-hour time-slot. The film's screenplay was written by novelist Elmore Leonard.

== Plot ==
Will Kane, now a private citizen living happily with his family, returns to the town of Hadleyville one year after the events of High Noon to conduct some business. He finds that the town is now in the hands of J.D. Ward, a corrupt marshal who allows his deputies to abuse and terrorize the citizens. Ward even shows his contempt for Kane by shooting the horses he purchased knowing that Kane can do nothing about it. Kane learns that Ward has organized a manhunt for outlaw Ben Irons and his men to collect the large bounty on their heads, despite the fact that none of them have committed any crimes and he is therefore acting outside of his authority as marshal. Kane, disgusted by Ward's actions and sharing a small friendship with Irons that dates back to his time as marshal, decides to help him escape from the law. Despite his efforts, Irons is shot and killed. Ward attempts to have Kane arrested for aiding a fugitive, but the townspeople turn on him and the local authorities, despite previously ignoring Ward's abuses, reinstate Kane as marshal and give him a warrant to jail Ward. Kane is given the old marshal's star he threw away at the end of the first movie, and kills Ward when he resists arrest. The movie ends with Kane sharing a tender moment with his wife and surrounded by the townspeople, finally grateful for all he's done for them.

== Cast ==
- Lee Majors as Will Kane
- David Carradine as Ben Irons
- Pernell Roberts as Marshal J.D. Ward
- Katherine Cannon as Amy Kane
- Michael Pataki as Darold
- M. Emmet Walsh as Harold Patton
- Frank Campanella as Dr. Losey
- J.A. Preston as Alonzo
- Tracey Walter as Harlan Tyler
- Britt Leach as Virgil

== Home media ==
High Noon, Part II: The Return of Will Kane was released on DVD in 2012.
