= Ziva Rodann =

Israeli-American actress and mime artist

- זיוה רודן
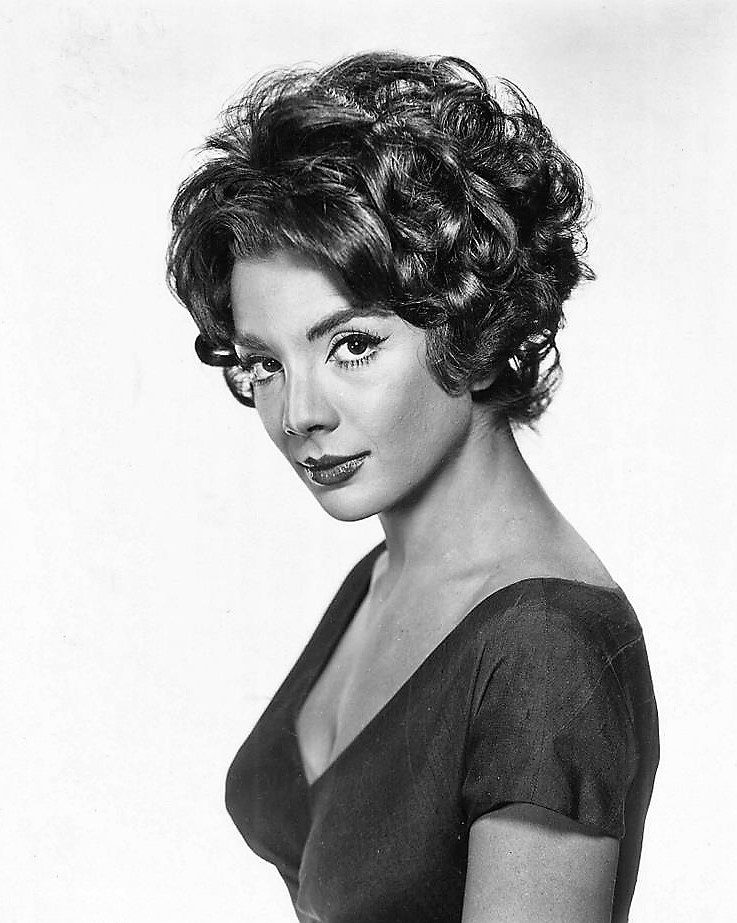
- Rodann in 1961
- Born: Ziva Blechman; 2 March 1933 (age 93); Haifa, British Mandate of Palestine (now in Israel)
- Other name: Ziva Shapir
- Citizenship: United States
- Education: Kirkwood High School
- Alma mater: Tel Aviv University
- Occupations: Actress; mime artist
- Years active: 1954–1969
- Known for: The Story of Ruth; Macumba Love; Batman
- Spouse(s): Mr. Zapick; Reid Kimball (1964; annulled) James R. Creech (m. 1967; div. 1975) Fred S. Meade (m. 1977; died 2002)

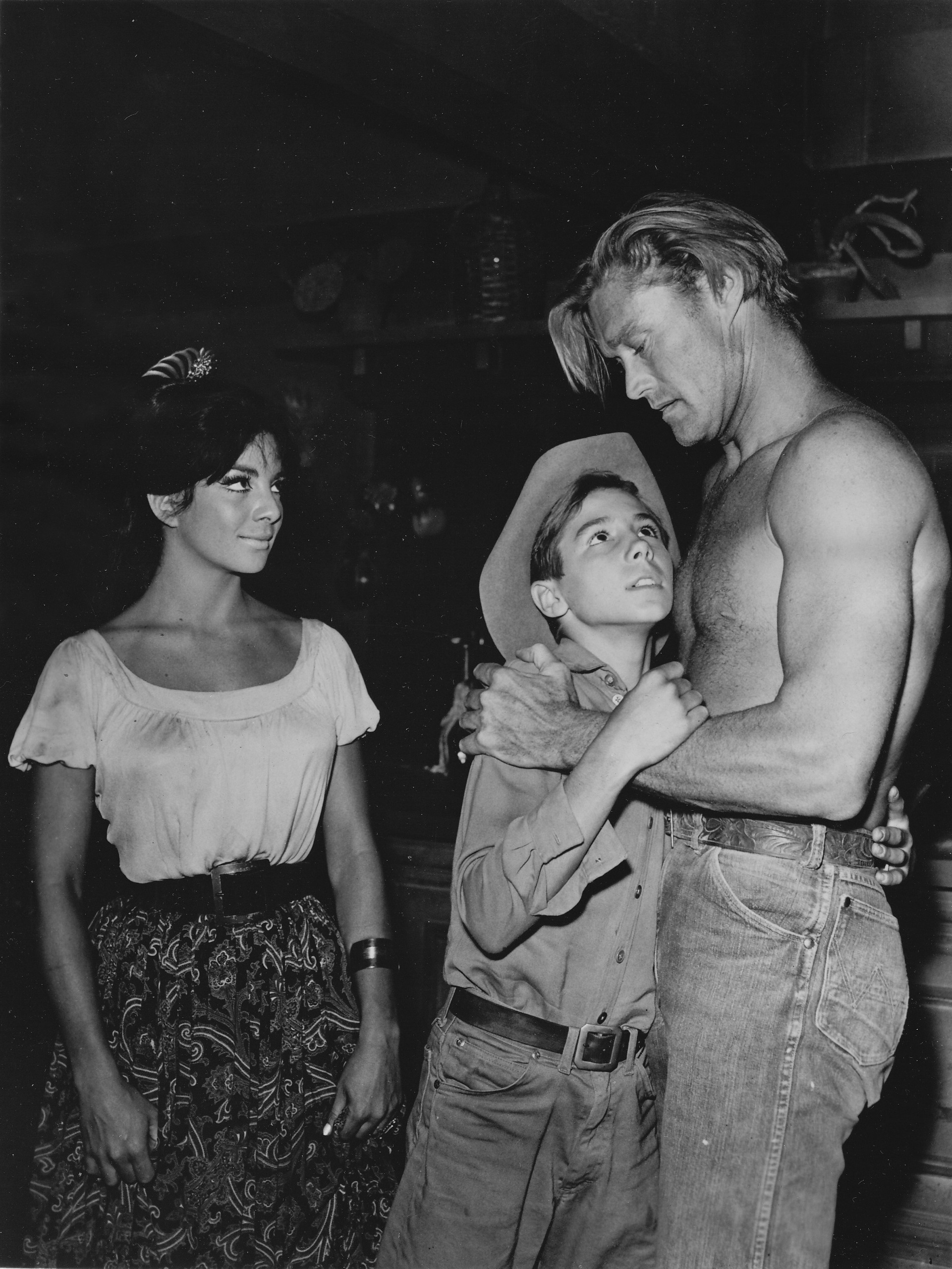
On The Rifleman (1961), L-R: Ziva Rodann, Johnny Crawford and Chuck Connors

Ziva Rodann (Hebrew: זיוה רודן, born Ziva Blechman זיוה בלכמן; 2 March 1933), known first as Ziva Shapir (זיוה שפיר), is an Israeli-American actress. She was a Hollywood film star and a frequent guest star on television series from the late 1950s to the late 1960s.

The Canadian Jewish Chronicle described her as "the first Israeli actress to be signed to a long-term deal with a major motion picture studio."

== Early life ==
Rodann was born in Haifa to Yeshaiahu "Shaya" Blechman, a professor of mathematics, and his wife, Rosa. She first arrived in the United States in 1947, when she was sent to live with her aunt and uncle in St. Louis, Missouri, U.S., where she attended and graduated from Kirkwood High School as Ziva Blackman.

When she returned to Israel, she took night classes at Tel Aviv University and majored in art, history, and languages. She was accepted at the Habima Theatre, where she studied acting, and then joined the Israeli army in 1952. In 1954, she worked at the Chamber Theatre, where she played leading roles in American plays in Hebrew and musical comedies.

In 1954, she was named queen of Israel's wine festival and toured America to promote Israeli wine.

== Career ==
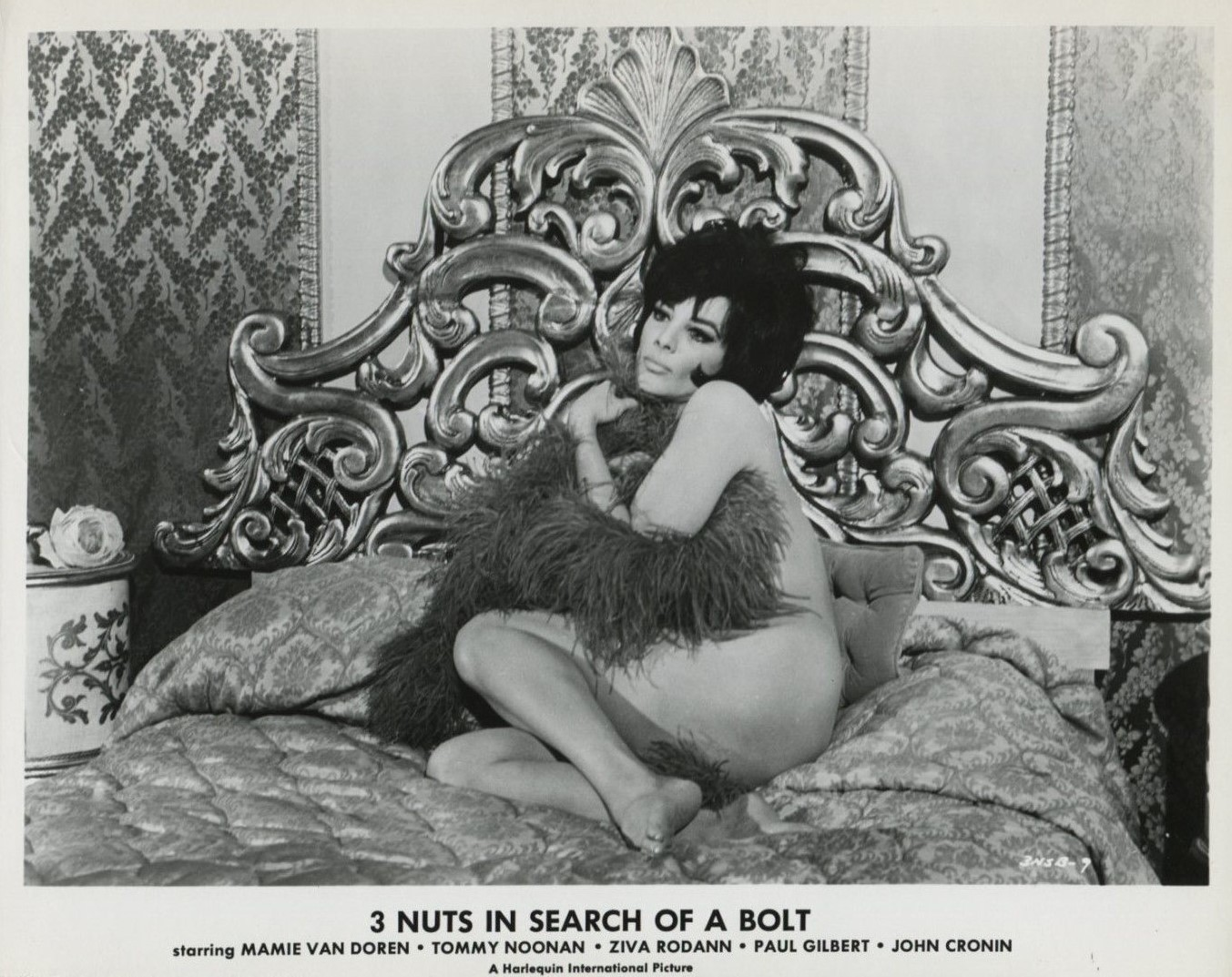
Rodann in 3 Nuts in Search of a Bolt (1964)

Rodann's first stage name was Ziva Shapir. She began her film career with an appearance in Israel's first film, Hill 24 Doesn't Answer, in 1955. Shapir then traveled to New York City, where she was discovered by Universal-International talent scout Maurice Bergman. After a successful screen test, she signed a long-term contract with Universal. Her first television role was featured in "Dancing Mouse", a 1956 episode of The Adventures of Hiram Holliday. Shapir made her debut in American cinema when Universal loaned her out to Bel-Air Productions for a starring role in the horror feature Pharaoh's Curse (1957), released by United Artists. She was billed second after actor Mark Dana and played the part of Simira, a mysterious Egyptian woman. Her final credit as Ziva Shapir was a minor role in The Tattered Dress (1957), starring Jeff Chandler and Jeanne Crain.

In 1957, Shapir changed her stage name to Ziva Rodann and was given a supporting role in Samuel Fuller's Forty Guns, starring Barbara Stanwyck. She followed this with uncredited performances as a gypsy singer in Yul Brynner's The Brothers Karamazov and an entertainer in Elvis Presley's King Creole (both released in 1958). One of her first notable roles was as Kirk Douglas' Native American wife in the Hal B. Wallis production Last Train from Gun Hill (1958). She portrayed Naomi's daughter-in-law Orpah in the 20th Century Fox biblical epic The Story of Ruth (1960), which stars another Israeli actress, Elana Eden. Macumba Love (1960), Subara (1962), Alexander the Great (1962) were among her other motion picture leads.

In 1961, she was a guest star on the western television series Bonanza, playing Maria Reagan in "The Fugitive"; Tales of Wells Fargo, playing Leah Harper in "Rifles for Red Hand"; and The Rifleman, playing Maria in "The Vaqueros". She also portrayed an Indian maharani in an episode of The Tab Hunter Show in 1961 and appeared in an episode ("The Case of the Glamorous Ghost") of Perry Mason in 1962, as well as an episode ("Made in Italy") of The Real McCoys. She played Nefertiti in two Batman episodes, "The Curse of Tut" (1966) and "The Pharaoh's in a Rut" (1966). She also starred in The Man from Uncle TV series in the episode “The Secret Sceptre Affair” in 1968. She has appeared in more than 40 films and television productions.

Her most notable role was Dr. Myrna Von in the film 3 Nuts in Search of a Bolt (1964), a film starring Mamie Van Doren and Tommy Noonan. In one short scene from the film, Rodann appears nude wrapped only in boa.

== Personal life ==
Rodann's first husband was Mr. Zapick, deputy director of Israel's Defense Ministry Purchase Mission to Paris.

Her brief marriage to Reid Kimball was annulled in 1964.

She married her third husband, actor and writer James R. Creech in 1967.

On 20 December 1974, Rodann became a naturalized citizen of the United States.

Divorced from Creech in December 1975, she married Fred S. Meade on 5 February 1977 in Los Angeles. Meade died in 2002.
