= Anxious Oswald Greene =

2013 short film

- Directed by: Marshall Axani
- Written by: Marshall Axani
- Produced by: Allude Entertainment
- Starring: Ryan Beil, John Novak, Ellie Harvie, Trevor Devall, Jacqueline Robbins, Joyce Robbins, Kelly Metzger
- Release date: 2012
- Country: Canada
- Language: English

Anxious Oswald Greene is a 2012 short Canadian adventure comedy written and directed by Marshall Axani. The film stars Ryan Beil, John Novak, Ellie Harvie, Trevor Devall, Jacqueline Robbins and Joyce Robbins. It was produced by Allude Entertainment.

== Premise ==
In a desperate attempt to cure his crippling anxiety, Oswald Greene visits a fantastical clinic to have his fate thrown into the hands of a blind nurse, a talking fly, and an eccentric doctor with a knack for rhyming.

== Cast ==
- Ryan Beil as Oswald
- John Novak as Dr. Revelstein
- Ellie Harvie as Nurse Pratchet
- Trevor Devall as The Fly (voice)
- Kelly Metzger as Ms. Fellows
- Jacqueline Robbins as Nicolina
- Joyce Robbins as Nicotina

== Awards ==
- Hot Shots Shorts 2012:
  - Short Film Award
- Whistler Film Festival 2013:
  - Best Canadian Shortwork Award
- LA Comedy Festival 2014:
  - Best Short Film
  - Best Direction
- Vancouver Short Film Festival 2014:
  - Best Cinematography
  - Best Editing
  - Best Sound Design
  - Best Visual Effects

In 2014, the team won a record 13 Leo Awards of 15 nominations, the most awards a single program has ever won, including:

- Best Short Production Drama
- Best Direction, Short Drama
- Best Performance by a Male, Short Drama
- Best Screenwriting, Short Drama
- Best Cinematography, Short Drama
- Best Picture Editing, Short Drama
- Best Visual Effects, Short Drama
- Best Overall Sound, Short Drama
- Best Sound Editing, Short Drama
- Best Musical Score, Short Drama
- Best Production Design, Short Drama
- Best Make-Up, Short Drama
- Best Hairstyling, Short Drama
- Kaohsiung Film Festival 2014:
  - Nominated Best Short Film
- Yorkton Film Festival 2014:
  - Nominated Best Short Film
