= Jacqueline and Joyce Robbins =

American-Canadian twin actresses (b. 1949)

- Born: September 9, 1949 (age 76); Rochester, Minnesota, U.S
- Education: University of Calgary
- Occupation: Actresses
- Years active: 1976-present

Jacqueline "Jacquie" Robbins and Joyce Robbins (born September 9, 1949) are twin American-Canadian actresses best known for playing the Blind Twins in The Wicker Man and for playing the White Faced Women in A Series of Unfortunate Events. They are based in Vancouver, British Columbia.

== Biography ==
Jacqueline "Jacquie" and Joyce Robbins were born in Rochester, Minnesota on September 9, 1949 to George Robbins and his wife Lilian Saper. They had one older brother and one younger sister. Their father practiced medicine as a doctor in Alberta while their mother was a pharmacist. Of Jewish descent, their father changed his name from Rabinovitz to Robbins when emigrating to Canada from Huși, Vaslui in Romania.

The sisters were raised in Calgary, Alberta. They would put on plays as children with the neighborhood kids, with their parents encouraging the sisters interest in acting.

As adults, they graduated at University of Calgary with BAs in 1972 and began teaching there for 15 years. They got their first onscreen acting job in the 1976 film Buffalo Bill and the Indians, or Sitting Bull's History Lesson in background roles.

The Robbins Sisters have appeared in numerous works including the 2006 remake of The Wicker Man and the Tom Cochrane music video for "Life Is a Highway".

They moved from Calgary to Vancouver in 22 November 2006.

They starred in a short film as the title leads in Mina.Minerva. They received higher recognition for their roles as the White Faced Women in the Netflix adaptation of A Series of Unfortunate Events. This role was actually meant to be a single character, but the siblings both turned up for the audition and asked to read the part as two persons. The producers liked the idea and cast them both.

== Personal life ==
They both briefly dated another pair of twins named Malcolm and Myron in the early 1970s before "going [their] separate ways." They have the unique ability to speak and sing in unison on the spot.

== Filmography ==
Film roles
Year	Title	Jackie	Joyce	Notes
1976	Buffalo Bill and the Indians, or Sitting Bull's History Lesson	Extras		Uncredited
1989	The Ranch	Twins		
1990	The Reflecting Skin	Twins		
2000	Coldblooded	Landlord		
2000	Burning Hear	Cabaret Woman	—N/a	
2003	Crisis Line	Jackie	—N/a	Direct-to-video
2004	Mindbenders	Lucretia	—N/a	
2006	The Wicker Man	Blind Twin #1	Blind Twin #2	
2008	A Season to Wither	Elizabeth	Beatrice	Short film
2009	Chloe and Attie	Attie	Chloe	Short film
2011	Seed Money	—N/a	Elyse	Short film
2013	Concrete Blondes	Mrs. Norton 2	Mrs. Norton	
2014	Bedbugs: A Musical Love Story	Enid	Iris	Short film
2014	Cut Bank	—N/a	Mrs. Margaret	
2014	Anxious Oswald Greene	Nicolina	Nicotina	Short film
2014	Jingle All the Way 2	Laraine	Rita	Direct-to-video
2014	Mina.Minerva	Mina	Minerva	Short film
2015	The Twisted Slipper	Fawning Lady 1	Fawning Lady 2	Short film
2015	The Starlight Heist	Dancing Twin Franny	Dancing Twin Fanny	Short film
2015	The Blackburn Asylum	Ivy	Iris	
2015	Even Lambs Have Teeth	Marge	Betty	
2015	Payment	Hertha Parker	—N/a	Short film
2015	FSM	Déjà Vu - Faye	—N/a	
2015	Dr. Barlow	Amelia Barlow		Short film
2016	Grocery Store Action Movie	Annoyed Shopper		Short film
2016	Counter Act	Actor	—N/a	Short film
2017	Of Tides/To Distill	Actor		Short film; Segment: "fig. 2"
2017	The Christmas Calendar	Edna	—N/a	
2018	Small Fish	Old Lady	—N/a	Short film
2018	A Typical Fairytale	Extra		Short film; uncredited
2018	Queen Jane and the Wizard	Sweetie	Evelyn	Short film
2018	20 Minutes to Life	Hilde	Verna	Short film
2019	Hatch	Actor		Short film
2019	The Long Haul	Gladys	Glenda	Short film
2019	Lattine Di Perfezione	Emma	—N/a	Short film
2020	This is a Period Piece	Orderly	Orderly	Short film
2021	Andie the Great	Mrs. Tremblay	Miss Tremblay	
2024	Up in the Spotlight	Ghost	Ghost	Short film
2025	The Monkey	Neighbor Lady 2	Neighbor Lady 1	
2026	The Snake	Captain Stink		
2026	Unholy Night	Nonna	—N/a	

Television roles
Year	Title	Jackie	Joyce	Notes
1994	How the West Was Fun	Twin #1	Twin #2	TV movie
1997	Incredible Story Studios	Ms. Connors	—N/a	Episode: "Sports and Soap Operas"; Segment: "Are We Having Fun Yet?"
2000	High Noon	Jane	Hannah	TV movie
2005	The Magic of Ordinary Days	Mrs. Pratt	Mrs. Parker	TV movie
2008	7 Things to Do Before I'm 30	Ms. Baumgarten #2	Ms. Baumgarten #1	TV movie
2008	Amber Alert: Terror on the Highway	Margaret	Ruth	TV movie
2010	Goblin	Old Woman #1	Old Woman #2	TV movie
2012	Psych	Birdie Turkle	Beatrice Turkle	Episode: "Heeeeere's Lassie"
2014	Signed, Sealed, Delivered	Follies Twin #1	Follies Twin #2	Episode: "Time to Start Livin'"
2014	Some Assembly Required	Ellen	—N/a	Episode: "Fat Cat"
2014	Witches of East End	—N/a	Old Beggar Woman	Episode: "Box to the Future"
2015	Hipster Horror House	Cafe Manager		TV movie
2017	Android Employed	The Twins - Intro Sequence		4 episodes
2017-2019	A Series of Unfortunate Events	White Faced Woman #1	White Faced Woman #2	Recurring
2018	Chilling Adventures of Sabrina	Head Witch	—N/a	Episode: "Chapter Ten: The Witching Hour"
2018	Road to Christmas	Woman in Hat	—N/a	TV movie
2018	Jingle Around the Clock	Woman in Hat	—N/a	TV movie
2019	Charmed	Rita	Nita	Episode: "The Source Awakens"
2019	Christmas in Evergreen: Tidings of Joy	Cooper Twin #1	Cooper Twin #2	TV movie
2020	Christmas in Evergreen: Bells are Ringing	Cooper Twin #1	Cooper Twin #2	TV movie
2021	Joe Pickett	Violet Bouvier	Vivian Bouvier	Recurring
2020	Motherland: Fort Salem	—N/a	The Biddy	2 episodes
2022	Two Sentence Horror Stories	Mabel Laurent	Jane Laurent	Episode: "Crush"
2024	Percy Jackson and the Olympians	—N/a	Atropos	Episode: "A God Buys Us Cheeseburgers"
2024	So Help Me Todd	Tillie Lee	Mildred Lee	Episode: "Dial Margaret for Murder"
