= June Wilkinson =

English model and actress (1940–2025)

- Wilkinson in 1960
- Born: June Rose Wilkinson; 27 March 1940; Eastbourne, East Sussex, England
- Died: 21 July 2025 (aged 85); Long Beach, California, U.S.
- Occupations: Model; actress
- Height: 5 ft 6 in (1.68 m)
- Spouse: Dan Pastorini (m. 1973; div. 1982)
- Children: 1

June Rose Wilkinson (27 March 1940 – 21 July 2025) was an English model and actress who appeared in Playboy magazine and in films of the 1960s. One of the world's most-photographed women in the late 1950s and early 1960s, at the height of her career she was called "the most photographed nude in America". She was married to NFL quarterback and B-movie star Dan Pastorini from 1973 to 1982.

== Life and career ==
June Wilkinson was born 27 March 1940 in Eastbourne, England. Having started as a stage performer at the age of 12, she went on to become the youngest topless dancer, at the age of 15, at the Windmill Theatre in London from 1957 to 1958. During a promotional tour in the United States, she was discovered by Hugh Hefner. Her first appearance in Playboy, in September 1958, was titled "The Bosom". She was a brunette in those days, but in later shoots she was a blonde.

Wilkinson's second Playboy appearance was photographed by Russ Meyer. Meyer was an independent photographer at the time, and filming his ground-breaking The Immoral Mr. Teas (1959). Because she was under contract to Seven Arts at the time, Wilkinson could not officially appear in Meyer's film. However, as an uncredited and unpaid favor to the director, Wilkinson's breasts can be seen through a window in one scene.

Wilkinson appeared in Playboy again in August 1959 in a spread titled "The Bosom in Hollywood". During this period, she appeared with Spike Jones' band, together with actor Billy Barty. Recalling this period in her career, Wilkinson later remembered Barty with affection, but commented that off-stage, Jones had no sense of humor. In 1960, Wilkinson was featured in Playboy five times, in June, July, August, October, and again in November. Her feature in the November issue was titled "The Bosom Revisits Playboy". Wilkinson appeared in the 1960 voodoo film, Macumba Love, which promoted her measurements as "44-20-36". At times reported as up to "45-22-35", in 1963 Wilkinson stated that her measurements were actually "40-22-35".

In 1961 Wilkinson made several stage appearances on the U.S. West coast with performers such as Louis Jourdan in The Marriage-Go-Round, Sylvia Sidney in Come Blow Your Horn and Milton Berle in Norman, Is That You?. She had a brief role in John Cassavetes' 1962 film, Too Late Blues.

In December 1962, Wilkinson made her last appearance in Playboy, though her photos continued to appear in the magazine in anniversary and retrospective features. Though she was never an official Playboy Playmate, she was featured in the magazine on seven occasions and was one of the magazine's most popular photo subjects. She appeared in more than fifty other men's magazines and newspapers from 1958 to 1970, making her one of the most-photographed models of the era.

Wilkinson was the star of director Myron Gold's 1963 film, La Rabia or The Rage. Directed in Mexico City, the film has Wilkinson as a stripper with a gigolo boyfriend. She met Dan Pastorini, NFL quarterback for the Houston Oilers and Oakland Raiders in 1972, and they were married in 1973. They co-starred in the 1974 film Florida Connection (also known as Weed), for the producer of Rage. The couple divorced in 1982, and Wilkinson never remarried. She has a daughter, Brahna, by Pastorini.

In the 1970s–1980s Wilkinson starred in a series of sex comedy teasers, such as "Three in a Bedroom", "The Ninety-Day Mistress" (with Eve McVeagh) and "Will Success Spoil Rock Hunter?"

In 1997, in her late 50s, June came back for another nude shoot in The Best of Glamour Girls: Then and Now vol. 2 (Winter 1997). In 1999 when Playboy published its list of the "100 Sexiest Stars of the Century", June came in at #30.

Wilkinson died on 21 July 2025, at home in Long Beach, California, at the age of 85.

== Filmography ==
- Thunder in the Sun (1959) as Buxom Blonde at Marie's Place (uncredited)
- Mr. Tease and His Playthings as Nude Torso in the Window (uncredited)
- Grand Jury (1960) as Unknown (uncredited)
- The Private Lives of Adam and Eve (1960) as Saturday
- Career Girl (1960) as Joan
- Macumba Love (1960) as Sara
- 77 Sunset Strip (1961) as Little Maxine
- Too Late Blues (1961) as 'Shorty', Girl at Bar (uncredited)
- The Continental Twist (1961) as Jenny Watson
- Lover Come Back (1961) as Sigrid Freud, Stripper On Standee
- The Bellboy and the Playgirls (1962) as Madame Wimpepoole
- The Rage (1962) as Rita, The Starlet
- Who's Got the Action? (1962) as Bride (uncredited)
- The Candidate (1964) as Angela Wallace
- Batman (1968) as Evelina
- The Doris Day Show (1971) as Laura
- The ABC Comedy Hour (1972) as Unknown
- The Mack (1973) as Unknown (uncredited)
- The Florida Connection (1975) as Britt Claiborne
- Frankenstein's Great Aunt Tillie (1984) as Randy
- Texas Godfather (1985) as Audrey
- Vasectomy: A Delicate Matter (1986) as Mrs. Cromwell
- Talking Walls (1987) as Blonde
- Medium Rare (1987) as Unknown
- Keaton's Cop (1990) as Sandra 'Big Mama' Channing
- Three Bad Men (2005) as Billie
