= Keaton's Cop =

- Theatrical release poster
- Directed by: Robert Burge
- Written by: Michael B. Druxman
- Produced by: Robert Burge
- Starring: Lee Majors; Abe Vigoda; Don Rickles; Tracy Brooks Swope; Art LaFleur; June Wilkinson
- Cinematography: Roland "Ozzie" Smith
- Edited by: Terry Chambers
- Music by: Kevin Barnes; David Connor
- Production company: Third Coast Production
- Distributed by: Cannon Film Distributors
- Release date: March 9, 1990
- Running time: 100 minutes
- Country: United States
- Language: English

Keaton's Cop is a 1990 American crime film directed by Robert Burge and written by Michael B. Druxman. It was filmed in the island city of Galveston, Texas. The film stars Lee Majors, Abe Vigoda, Don Rickles, Tracy Brooks Swope, Art LaFleur and June Wilkinson. The film was released on March 9, 1990, by Cannon Film Distributors.

== Plot ==
Ex-mobster Keaton (Abe Vigoda), now living in a retirement home, narrowly misses being the target of a mob hit. Police officers Jake Barber (Don Rickles), who has known Keaton for a long time, and violent Mike Gable (Lee Majors), who takes an immediate disliking to the aging gangster, are called in to investigate a string of murders targeting senior citizens and to protect Keaton. When Barber gets caught in the crossfire of a pair of hit men, Gable and Keaton are forced to get along while they search for the killer.

== Cast ==
- Lee Majors as Mike Gable
- Abe Vigoda as Louis Keaton
- Don Rickles as Jake
- Tracy Brooks Swope as Susan
- Art LaFleur as Detective. Ed Hayes
- June Wilkinson as Sandra Channing / Big Mama
- Robert Hilliard as Lt. Spencer
- Denise Kerwin as Julie
- Talbot Perry Simons as Al
- George A. Simonelli as Rick Dante
- Fredrica Duke as Marsha Gable
- Clinton Austin Shirley as Jimmy Gable
- Richard L. Duran as Officer Diaz
- Robert Foster as Woody Clark
- Nick Gambella as Stan
- Dominic Barto as Hotel Assassin
- Peter Bryson as Fat Tony Monetti
- Ed Geldart as Lennie
- Helen Akerman as Agnes Marx
- Ronald Lee Jones as Ray Channing
- Jeff Jensen as Percy
