= John W. Cunningham =

American novelist

John Marshall Cunningham (July 28, 1915 – June 4, 2002) was an American author who wrote a number of Western novels and stories as "John W. Cunningham" or "John M. Cunningham."

== Biography ==
He was born July 28, 1915, at Deer Lodge, Montana, the son of John and Sue Cunningham. During the Second World War, he served in the U.S. Army in the South Pacific. While living in Santa Barbara, California, he became a published novelist. He moved to Ashland, Oregon in 1985, where he lived until his death.

His most famous work was "The Tin Star", a short story which appeared in Collier's Magazine in 1947. It was adapted into the film High Noon in 1952, which starred Gary Cooper (Academy Award, Best Actor) and Grace Kelly. The adapted screenplay by Carl Foreman was nominated for an Academy Award.

His sister Julia Cunningham was an author of children's literature.

== Works ==
=== Novels ===
- Warhorse (1956)
- "Starfall" (1960)
- Rainbow Runner (1992)

=== Short stories ===
- "The Tin Star" (1947) (available on the internet at http://erginguney.com/web/coursematerial/The_Tin_star.pdf)
- "Yankee Gold" (1953) (filmed as The Stranger Wore a Gun (1953)
- "Day of the Bad Man" (filmed in 1958)
