= Allude Entertainment =

Allude Entertainment is a Vancouver-based film production company. It was founded by Diana Donaldson, Marshall Axani and Naim Sutherland in 2012.

== About ==
Allude is a film collective, a core group of creatives that collaborates closely with members of the Canadian film industry to produce narrative-driven films. Producer Diana Donaldson and Writer/Director Marshall Axani are both graduates from Capilano University's School Of Motion Picture Arts, with Donaldson also completing Vancouver Film School's writing program. Director of Photography Naim Sutherland is a VFS graduate and current professor.

Their independent projects have earned them various awards, including a record 13 Leo Awards for Anxious Oswald Greene in 2013. In 2015, the team received the Telefilm Microbudget Grant to produce their first feature film, currently titled The Hanging Tree (New Title TBD), slated to shoot in early 2016.

== Short films ==
=== 2012 ===
- A Clinical Diagnosis of: Social Anxiety
- A Clinical Diagnosis of: Acrophobia
- A Clinical Diagnosis of: Glossophobia
- The Vessel
- Ghosts Of Europe

=== 2013 ===
- Anxious Oswald Greene
- Mina Minerva

== Feature films ==
=== 2016 ===
- The Hanging Tree (new title TBD) (pre-production)
