= Lee Majors =

American actor (born 1939)

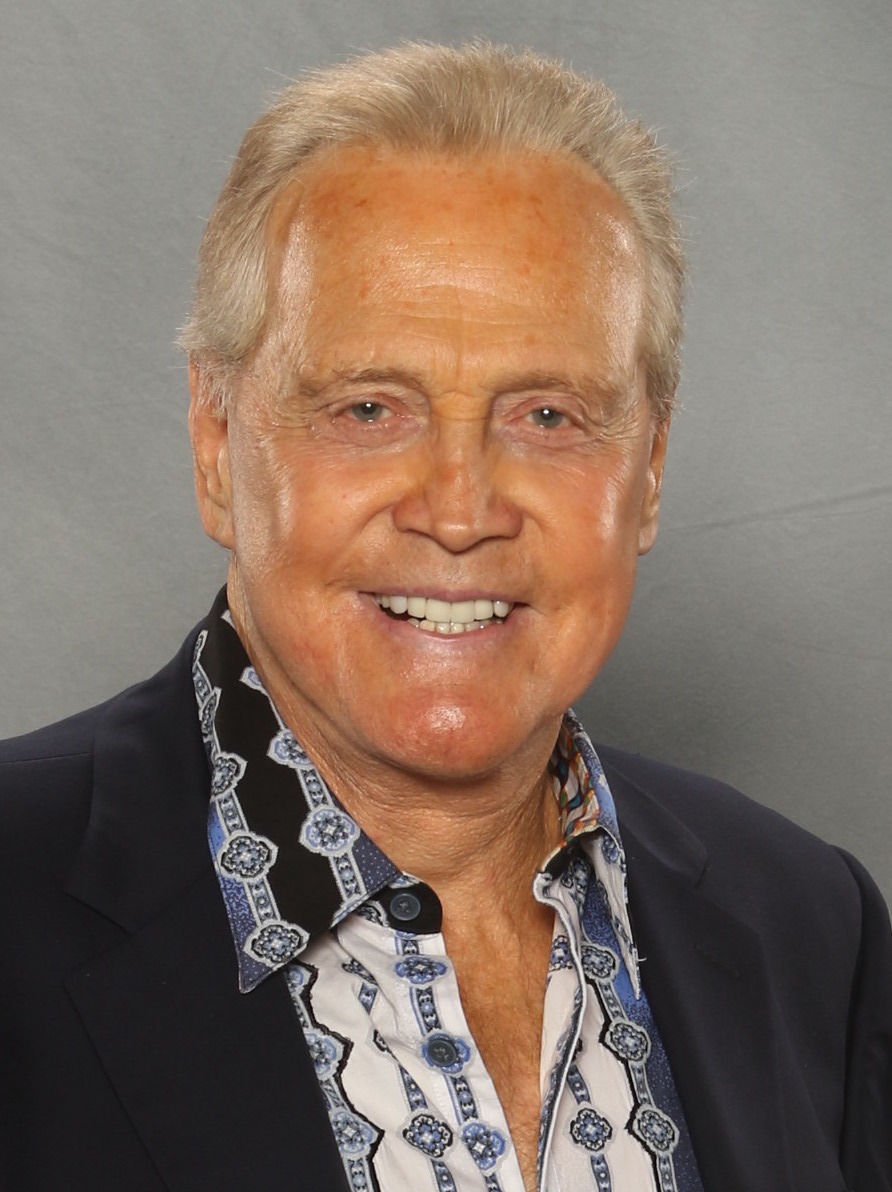
- Majors in 2017
- Born: Harvey Lee Yeary; April 23, 1939 (age 87); Wyandotte, Michigan, U.S.
- Education: Eastern Kentucky University
- Occupation: Actor
- Years active: 1964–present
- Known for: The Six Million Dollar Man; The Big Valley; The Fall Guy; Owen Marshall, Counselor at Law
- Spouses: Kathy Robinson (m. 1961; div. 1964); Farrah Fawcett (m. 1973; div. 1982); Karen Velez (m. 1988; div. 1994); Faith Noelle Cross (m. 2002)
- Children: 4
- Awards: Hollywood Walk of Fame

Harvey Lee Yeary (born April 23, 1939), known professionally as Lee Majors, is an American actor. He portrayed the characters of Heath Barkley on the American television Western series The Big Valley (1965–1969), Colonel Steve Austin on the American television science-fiction action series The Six Million Dollar Man (1973–1978), and Colt Seavers on the American television action series The Fall Guy (1981–1986).

== Early life ==
Majors was born Harvey Lee Yeary on April 23, 1939, in Wyandotte, Michigan, a suburb of Detroit to Carl Yeary (1904–1938) and Alice Yeary (née Eck, 1907–1940). His father died five months prior to his birth, and his mother was killed by a drunk driver while waiting for a bus when he was almost seventeen months old. At the age of two, Majors was adopted by his uncle and aunt, Harvey and Mildred Yeary, and he moved with them to Middlesboro, Kentucky.

Majors participated in track and football at Middlesboro High School. He graduated in 1957, and played football at Indiana University in 1957–1958. Majors transferred to Eastern Kentucky University in Richmond, Kentucky in 1959. He played in his first football game the following year, but suffered a severe back injury which left him paralyzed for two weeks and ruined his college athletic career. Following his injury, he turned his attention to acting and performed in plays at the Pioneer Playhouse in Danville, Kentucky. Majors graduated from Eastern Kentucky in 1962 with a degree in history and physical education. He planned to be a football coach.

After college, he received an offer to try out for the St. Louis Cardinals football team. Instead, he moved to Los Angeles and found work at the Los Angeles Recreation and Parks Department as the recreation director at the North Hollywood Park. In Los Angeles, Majors met many actors and industry professionals, including Dick Clayton, who had been James Dean's agent, and Clayton suggested he attend his acting school. After one year of acting school, Clayton felt that Majors was ready to start his career. At this time, he picked up the stage name Lee Majors as a tribute to childhood hero Johnny Majors, who was a player and future coach for the University of Tennessee. Majors also studied at Estelle Harman's acting school at MGM.

== Career ==
=== Early roles ===
Majors landed his first, although uncredited, role in Strait-Jacket (1964), in a flashback sequence as Joan Crawford's cheating husband. After appearing in a 1965 episode of Gunsmoke, he starred later that year as Howard White in an episode of The Alfred Hitchcock Hour, "The Monkey's Paw – A Retelling", based on the short story by W. W. Jacobs.

Majors got his big break when he was chosen out of over 400 young actors, including Burt Reynolds, for the co-starring role of Heath Barkley in a new ABC/ Four Star Western series, The Big Valley, which starred Barbara Stanwyck. Also starring on the show was another newcomer, Linda Evans, who played Heath's younger sister, Audra. Richard Long and Peter Breck, (who himself had previously starred in Black Saddle for Four Star) played his brothers Jarrod and Nick, respectively. One of Heath's frequently used expressions during the series was "Boy howdy!" During the series, Majors co-starred in the 1968 Charlton Heston film Will Penny, for which he received an "Introducing" credit, and landed the lead role in The Ballad of Andy Crocker (1969), a made-for-television film which was first broadcast by ABC. The film was one of the first films to deal with the subject matter of Vietnam veterans "coming home". That same year, he was offered the chance to star in Midnight Cowboy (1969), but when The Big Valley was renewed, he declined the role (which later went to Jon Voight). When The Big Valley was cancelled in 1969, he signed a long-term contract with Universal Studios. In 1970, Majors appeared in William Wyler's final film The Liberation of L.B. Jones, and joined the cast of The Virginian for its final season when the show was restructured as The Men from Shiloh featuring four alternating leads. Majors played new ranch hand Roy Tate.

Majors was called a "blond Elvis Presley" because of his resemblance to Elvis during this period of his career.

=== 1970s: The Six Million Dollar Man ===
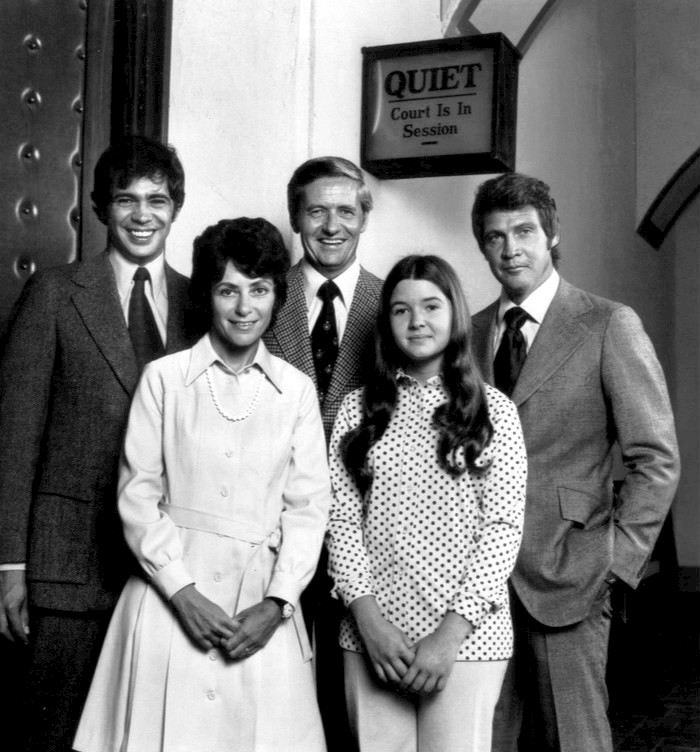
Owen Marshall cast, 1973. Back, L-R: Reni Santoni, Arthur Hill, Majors. Front: Joan Darling and Christine Matchett.

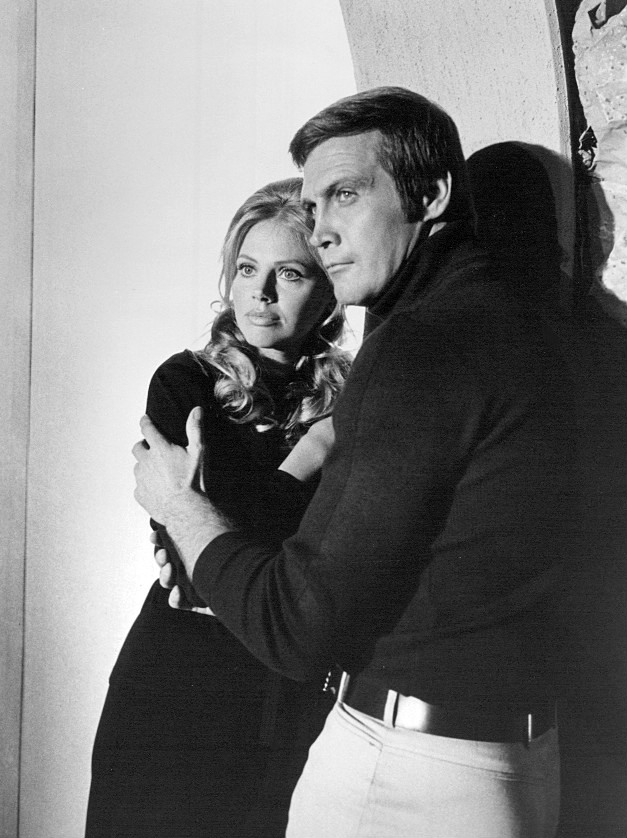
Majors with Britt Ekland in The Six Million Dollar Man (1973)

In 1971, he landed the role of Arthur Hill's partner, Jess Brandon, on Owen Marshall: Counselor at Law, which garnered critical acclaim during its three seasons on ABC.

Majors's co-starring role on Owen Marshall led him to a starring role as United States Air Force Colonel Steve Austin, an ex-astronaut with bionic implants in The Six Million Dollar Man, a 1973 television film broadcast on ABC. In 1974, the network decided to turn it into a weekly series. The series became an international success, being screened in over 71 countries, turning Majors into a pop icon. Majors also made his directorial debut in 1975, on an episode called "One of Our Running Backs Is Missing" which co-starred professional football players such as Larry Csonka and Dick Butkus.

In 1977, with The Six Million Dollar Man still a hit series, Majors tried to renegotiate his contract with Universal Television. The studio in turn filed a lawsuit to force him to report to work due to stipulations within his existing contract that had not yet expired. It was rumored that Majors was holding out for more money, but his manager denied this: according to him, Majors was fighting to have his own production company, Fawcett Majors Productions, brought on as an independent producer in association with Universal in order to make the company viable. After Majors did not report to work that June, studio executives ultimately relented. However, ratings began to decline and The Six Million Dollar Man was cancelled on ABC in 1978. The companion show, The Bionic Woman, was also cancelled at around the same time on NBC.

The Six Million Dollar Man was revived for three TV movies in the 1980s. In November 2010, Time-Life released a 40-DVD set featuring every episode and bonus features from the show.

During the 1970s, while working on The Six Million Dollar Man, Majors also appeared in various movies: the television film Francis Gary Powers: The True Story of the U-2 Spy Incident (1976, as Francis Gary Powers), the Viking film The Norseman (1978) co-starring Cornel Wilde, the horror thriller Killer Fish (1979), and the drama Steel (1979), which he produced, co-starring Jennifer O'Neill and Art Carney.

=== 1980s: The Fall Guy ===
In 1981, Majors returned in another long-running television series. Producer Glen A. Larson (who had first worked with Majors on Alias Smith and Jones, in which Majors guest starred, and later on The Six Million Dollar Man) asked him to star in The Fall Guy. Majors played Colt Seavers, a Hollywood stuntman who moonlights as a bounty hunter. Majors also sang its theme song, the self-effacing The Unknown Stuntman. The show was a hit, and as one of the producers, Majors invited many of his former co-stars, including Linda Evans, Peter Breck, Lindsay Wagner, Richard Anderson, Stewart Granger, Doug McClure, James Drury, and Buddy Hackett to appear in various episodes. The series ran for five seasons and ended in 1986.

His 1980s films include the political thriller Agency (1980), starring Robert Mitchum, the made-for-TV sequel High Noon, Part II: The Return of Will Kane (1980), playing Gary Cooper's original role, the science fiction film The Last Chase (1981), and the disaster film Starflight: The Plane That Couldn't Land (1983). Majors also made cameo appearances in Circle of Two (1980), and as himself in the 1988 holiday comedy Scrooged.

Between 1987 and 1994, Majors, with co-stars Lindsay Wagner and Richard Anderson, made three The Six Million Dollar Man/The Bionic Woman television films.

=== 1990s–present ===
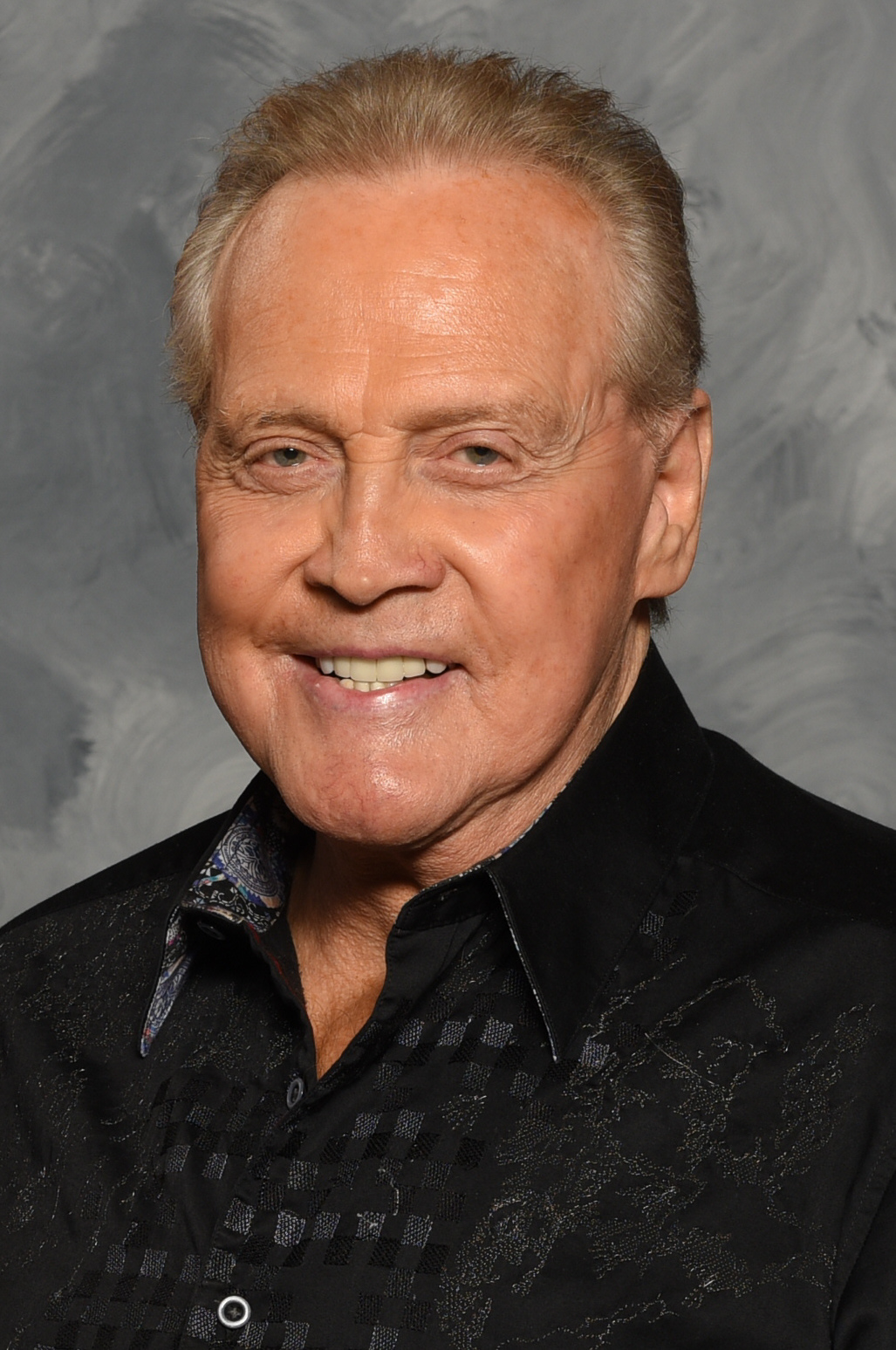
Majors at the Florida Supercon in 2017

In 1990, he starred in the film Keaton's Cop, and had recurring roles in Tour of Duty and the short-lived 1992 series, Raven. He also had supporting roles in the films Trojan War (1997), Out Cold (2001), Big Fat Liar (2002), and The Brothers Solomon (2007). He voiced the character of "Big" Mitch Baker in the 2002 video game Grand Theft Auto: Vice City. He played Jaret Reddick's disconnected father in Bowling For Soup's 2007 video, "When We Die". That same year, he played Grandpa Max in Ben 10: Race Against Time, and voiced a character on the APTN animated children's program Wapos Bay: The Series that was named "Steve from Austin".

Majors played Coach Ross on the CW Network television series The Game, which ran from October 1, 2006, to May 20, 2009.

Majors appeared in the role of God in "Jim Almighty", a 2008 episode of According to Jim. He later returned to the role in that show's 2009 series finale, "Heaven Opposed to Hell". Also in 2008, Majors played a member of the Minutemen (dedicated to preventing illegal border crossings) in season four of the Showtime series Weeds, where he recruits Kevin Nealon's character. Majors reprised his role (voice only) as Col. Steve Austin in the "Bionic Woman" segment of the Robot Chicken season four episode "Love, Maurice" (2009).

In March 2010, Majors played the crusty sailing instructor in the Community episode "Beginner Pottery". In April 2010, he appeared as the mentor of the series lead in "Christopher Chance", the 12th episode of Human Target. Later that year, he provided the voice of General Abernathy in G.I. Joe: Renegades. He later reprised the role in a 2011 episode. In 2011, he appeared as "Rockwell" in Jerusalem Countdown. From 2011 to 2014 he appeared in three episodes of the Fox comedy Raising Hope, as Burt's father, Ralph. On February 1, 2013, it was announced that Majors would appear in a two-episode guest spot in season two of TNT's Dallas as Ken Richards, an old flame of Sue Ellen's. In 2015, he appeared as J.D. in the faith-based drama Do You Believe? and the hip-hop dance-themed series Avengers of eXtreme Illusions. Majors appeared in the second and third seasons of Ash vs Evil Dead as Brock Williams, the father of Ash Williams (Bruce Campbell). In the 2017 TV film, Eat, Play, Love, he was reunited with the Bionic Woman Lindsay Wagner. In late 2018, Majors voiced an animated Six Million Dollar Man action figure in an advertisement for Honda's "Happy Honda Days" sale event. In 2019, Majors voiced Jeff Tracy in Thunderbirds Are Go. In 2024, Majors reunited with Heather Thomas, his co-star from The Fall Guy TV series, for cameo appearances in the movie version of The Fall Guy, in which Ryan Gosling played Majors' TV series character Colt Seavers.

== Personal life ==
=== Marriages ===
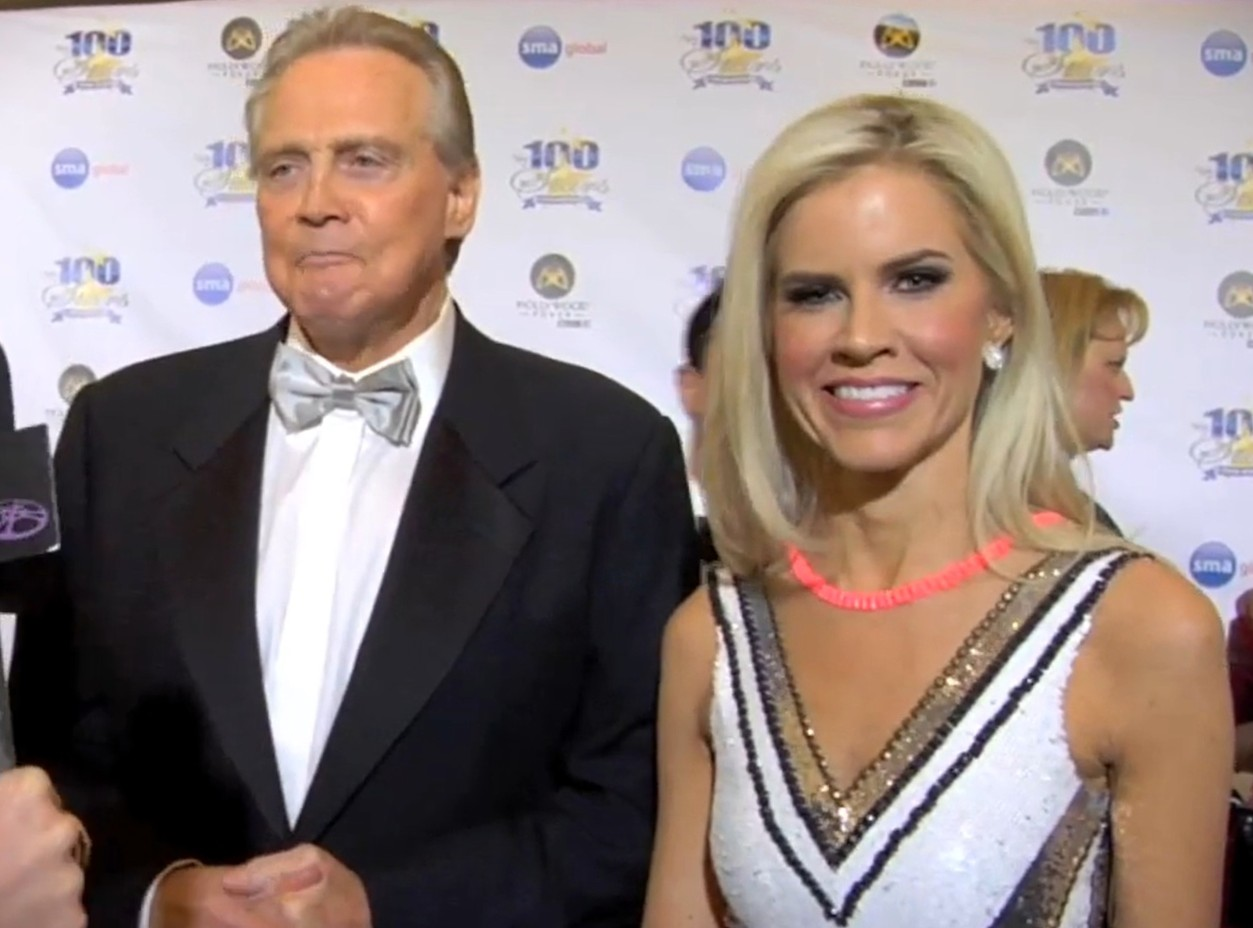
Lee and Faith Majors (formerly Cross) in 2013

- Kathy Robinson (married 1961, divorced 1964) – One child together, Lee Majors Jr. (born April 8, 1962), who later became an actor and appeared alongside his father on an episode of The Fall Guy and in all three Six Million Dollar Man/Bionic Woman reunion telefilms, credited as Lee Majors II.
- Farrah Fawcett (married 1973, separated 1979, divorced 1982) – During the first six years of their marriage, she went by the name of Farrah Fawcett-Majors. Fawcett died in 2009. Majors' theme tune for The Fall Guy, The Unknown Stuntman, makes reference to her, and she made a cameo appearance in the series pilot.
- Karen Velez (married 1988, divorced 1994) – Playboy Playmate; one daughter and twin sons. Died July 2, 2023.
- Faith Noelle Cross (married on November 1, 2002) – actress and model.

=== Health ===
In 2003, Majors underwent heart bypass surgery.

=== Los Angeles Express ===
In April 1983, Majors became part owner of the LA Express of the United States Football League.

=== Popular culture ===
The song "Midnight Train to Georgia" was inspired by Lee Majors and Farrah Fawcett. Songwriter Jim Weatherly phoned his friend Majors one day, and the call was answered by Fawcett. Weatherly and Fawcett chatted briefly and she told him she was going to visit her mother and was taking "the midnight plane to Houston." Although Majors and Fawcett were both successful by that time, Weatherly used them as "characters" in his song about a failed actress who leaves Los Angeles, and is followed by her boyfriend who cannot live without her. Eventually the genders were swapped, the plane became a train, and Houston was changed to Georgia. The recording by Gladys Knight & the Pips went to number one in 1973.

In the 1994 The Simpsons episode "Burns' Heir", Marge Simpson fantasizes about running off with Majors.

The title of the Beastie Boys song "Lee Majors Come Again" is a reference to Majors.

== Filmography ==
=== Film ===
| Year | Title | Role | Notes |
|---|---|---|---|
| 1964 | Strait-Jacket | Frank Harbin | Uncredited |
| 1967 | Clambake | Man in Restaurant | Uncredited |
| 1968 | Will Penny | Blue | |
| 1969 | The Ballad of Andy Crocker | Andy Crocker | |
| 1970 | The Liberation of L.B. Jones | Steve Mundine | |
| 1970 | Weekend of Terror | Larry | |
| 1976 | The True Story of the U-2 Spy Incident | Francis Gary Powers | |
| 1977 | Just a Little Inconvenience | Frank Logan | |
| 1978 | The Norseman | Thorvald | |
| 1979 | Killer Fish | Lasky | |
| 1979 | Steel | Mike Catton | |
| 1980 | Agency | Philip Morgan | |
| 1980 | High Noon, Part II: The Return of Will Kane | Will Kane | |
| 1981 | Circle of Two | Theatre Patron | Cameo |
| 1981 | The Last Chase | Franklyn Hart | |
| 1983 | Starflight: The Plane That Couldn't Land | Captain Cody Briggs | |
| 1988 | Scrooged | Lee Majors | |
| 1990 | Keaton's Cop | Mike Gable | |
| 1991 | Fire: Trapped on the 37th Floor | Deputy Chief Sterling | |
| 1992 | Raven: Return of the Black Dragons | Herman 'Ski' Jablonski | |
| 1994 | Bionic Ever After? | Colonel Steve Austin | |
| 1997 | Trojan War | Officer Austin | |
| 1998 | The Protector | Austin | |
| 1998 | Musketeers Forever | Ben O'Connor | |
| 2000 | Primary Suspect | Lieutenant Blake | |
| 2001 | Out Cold | John Majors | |
| 2002 | Big Fat Liar | Vince | |
| 2003 | Fate | Oscar Ogden | |
| 2004 | Arizona Summer | Mr. Travers | |
| 2005 | The Last Confederate: The Story of Robert Adams | Dr. Jack Lee | Deleted scenes |
| 2005 | Hell to Pay | Marshal Boone | |
| 2006 | When I Find the Ocean | Thomas | |
| 2006 | Lightspeed | Tanner | |
| 2006 | Waitin' to Live | Bucko Cassidy | |
| 2006 | National Lampoon's TV: The Movie | Dr. Lakin | |
| 2007 | The Brothers Solomon | Ed Solomon | |
| 2007 | Ben 10: Race Against Time | Max Tennyson | |
| 2009 | The Adventures of Umbweki | Police Captain Richard | |
| 2010 | Johnny | Dr. Miller | |
| 2010 | Corruption.Gov | Jim Lawrence | |
| 2011 | Jerusalem Countdown | Rockwell | |
| 2013 | Matt's Chance | The Figure | |
| 2014 | The Legend of Darkhorse County | Sheriff McElroy | |
| 2015 | Do You Believe? | J.D. | |
| 2015 | Toxin: 700 Days Left on Earth | President Austin | |
| 2016 | Almosting It | Chet | |
| 2016 | Wild Bill Hickok: Swift Justice | Grandpa Hickok | |
| 2016 | Jean | Spiritual Stone | |
| 2017 | Victory by Submission | Sam Jordan | |
| 2021 | Narco Sub | Dallas Chapman | |
| 2022 | Renegades | Carver | |
| 2024 | The Fall Guy | Police Officer | Cameo |

=== Television ===
| Year | Title | Role | Notes |
|---|---|---|---|
| 1965 | Gunsmoke | Dave Lukens | Episode: "Song for Dying" |
| 1965–1969 | The Big Valley | Heath Barkley | 112 episodes |
| 1965 | The Alfred Hitchcock Hour | Howard White | Episode: "The Monkey's Paw–A Retelling" |
| 1970 | Bracken's World | Frank Carver | Episode: "Super-Star" |
| 1970–1971 | The Virginian | Roy Tate | 24 episodes |
| 1971 | Marcus Welby, M.D. | Jess Brandon | Episode: "Men Who Care" |
| 1971–1974 | Owen Marshall, Counselor at Law | Jess Brandon | 53 episodes |
| 1972 | Alias Smith and Jones | Joe Briggs | Episode: "The McCreedy Bust: Going, Going, Gone" |
| 1972 | The Sixth Sense | Clayton Ross | Episode: "With This Ring, I Thee Kill!" |
| 1973–1978 | The Six Million Dollar Man | Colonel Steve Austin | 99 episodes TV Land Award for Superest Super Hero (2003); Nominated – Golden Globe Award for Best Actor – Television Series Drama (1976) |
| 1974 | Funshine Saturday Sneak Peek | Lee Majors / Steve Austin | Television film |
| 1976 | The Bionic Woman | Colonel Steve Austin | 6 episodes |
| 1981–1986 | The Fall Guy | Colt Seavers | Lead role 113 episodes |
| 1983 | Trauma Center | Colt Seavers | Episode: "Notes About Courage" |
| 1983 | The Love Boat | Robert Richards | 2 episodes |
| 1984 | The Cowboy and the Ballerina | Bob Clayton (aka Clay) | Television film |
| 1986 | A Smoky Mountain Christmas | Mountain Dan | Television film |
| 1987 | The Return of the Six Million Dollar Man and the Bionic Woman | Colonel Steve Austin | Television film |
| 1988 | Dolly | Harold "Chance" Coleman | Episode: "#1.14" |
| 1988 | Danger Down Under | Reed Harris | Television film |
| 1989 | Bionic Showdown: The Six Million Dollar Man and the Bionic Woman | Steve Austin | Television film |
| 1989 | CBS Summer Playhouse | Jesse Pruitt | Episode: "Road Show" |
| 1990 | Tour of Duty | "Pop" Scarlet | 5 episodes |
| 1992–1993 | Raven | Herman "Ski" Jablonski | 20 episodes |
| 1993 | The Cover Girl Murders | Rex Kingman | Television film |
| 1994 | Bionic Ever After? | Steve Austin | Television Film |
| 1995 | Lonesome Dove: The Series | Woodrow F. Call | Episode: "Ties That Bind" |
| 1995 | Achilles | Peleus | Television film |
| 1995 | The Pinocchio Shop | Howard Hughes | Episode: "Air Tristan" |
| 1996 | Promised Land | Jim Walker | Episode: "The Secret" |
| 1996 | Daytona Beach | Owen Travers | Television film |
| 1997 | Lost Treasure of Dos Santos | Roy Stark | Television film |
| 1998 | Walker, Texas Ranger | Sheriff Bell | Episode: "On the Border" |
| 1999 | Soldier of Fortune, Inc. | Tom Winters | Episode: "Critical List" |
| 2000 | Family Guy | Himself | Voice, episode: "Running Mates" |
| 2000 | V.I.P. | Jed Irons | Episode: "Ride of the Valkyries" |
| 2000 | The War Next Door | Kennedy Smith Sr. | Episode: "Father Knows Death" |
| 2000 | Too Much Sun | Scott Reed | 6 episodes |
| 2001 | Hotel! | President of the U.S.A. | Television film |
| 2001 | Hard Knox | Darrell Knox | Television film |
| 2002 | Son of the Beach | Colonel Seymore Kooze | 3 episodes |
| 2003 | Jake 2.0 | Richard Fox | Episode: "Double Agent" |
| 2004 | The Trail to Hope Rose | Marshall Toll | Television film |
| 2005 | Will & Grace | Burt Wolfe | Episode: "It's a Dad, Dad, Dad, Dad World" |
| 2007 | The Minor Accomplishments of Jackie Woodman | Governor of California | Episode: "Good Times and Great Oldies" |
| 2007–2009 | The Game | Coach Ross | 6 episodes |
| 2007 | Wapos Bay | Steve from Ausin | Voice, episode: "Guardians" |
| 2007 | Me & Lee? | | Television film |
| 2008 | Wainy Days | David's Dad | Episode: "Rebecca" |
| 2008–2009 | According to Jim | God | Episodes: "Jim Almighty" and "Heaven Opposed to Hell" |
| 2008 | Weeds | Minute-Man Leader | 3 episodes |
| 2008 | Cold Case | Dean London '08 | Episode: "Wings" |
| 2009 | Robot Chicken | Various | Voice; Episode: "Love, Maurice" |
| 2010 | Community | Admiral Lee Slaughter | Episode: "Beginner Pottery" |
| 2010 | Human Target | Christopher Chance | Episode: "Christopher Chance" |
| 2010–2011 | G.I. Joe: Renegades | General Abernathy | Voice; 3 episodes |
| 2011 | $h*! My Dad Says | Don Reger | Episode: "Well Suitored" |
| 2011 | Grey's Anatomy | Chuck Cain | Episode: "Poker Face" |
| 2012 | Crash & Burn | Boss McCoy | Television film |
| 2012 | CSI: NY | Paul Burton | Episode: "Flash Pop" |
| 2013 | Dallas | Ken Richards | 3 episodes |
| 2013–2014 | Raising Hope | Ralph | Episodes: "Burt Mitzvah: The Musical" and "Hot Dish" |
| 2015 | The AXI: The Avengers of Extreme Illusions | Steve the Mechanic | Episode: "The Mechanic" |
| 2016–2018 | Ash vs. Evil Dead | Brock Williams | 8 episodes Nominated – Saturn Award for Best Supporting Actor on Television (2016) |
| 2017 | Eat, Play, Love | Dr. Isaac Monroe | Television film |
| 2018 | Fuller House | James | Episode: "Angels' Night Out" |
| 2018 | Bicycle | Jan | Television film |
| 2019 | Magnum P.I. | Russell Harlan | Episode #27: "The Man in the Secret Room" |
| 2019–2020 | Thunderbirds Are Go | Jeff Tracy | Voice, 3 episodes |
| 2021 | Diners, Drive-Ins and Dives | Himself | Episode: "Meat and Heat" (guest appearance) |
| 2022 | Guy's Grocery Games | Himself | Episode: "Craziest Day in Flavortown" (special guest appearance) |

=== Video games ===
| Year | Title | Role | Notes |
|---|---|---|---|
| 2002 | Grand Theft Auto: Vice City | Mitch Baker | |
