= Jaime Sommers (Bionic Woman) =

Jaime Wells Sommers
- First appearance: "Pilot"
- Last appearance: "Do Not Disturb"
- Portrayed by: Michelle Ryan

In-universe information
- Alias: The Bionic Woman
- Gender: Female
- Occupation: Anti-terrorist operative; former bartender
- Family: Becca Sommers (sister); Ethan (father); Madeline Jo (mother, deceased)

Jaime Wells Sommers is a fictional character portrayed by Michelle Ryan in Bionic Woman, a remake of the original 1970s series The Bionic Woman in which Lindsay Wagner took the lead role. The character was created by Kenneth Johnson based upon concepts from author Martin Caidin's 1972 novel, Cyborg (neither Johnson nor Caidin, however, receive screen credit on the 2007 remake).

== Fictional character history ==
The new version of the character is a San Francisco bartender. She was born in Van Horne, Iowa, to political activists, Ethan and Madeline Jo Sommers. Both parents traveled a lot for their causes, and could be away for days or weeks at a time. When he would return home, Ethan always brought back photographs of his travels for Jaime, and, even at a young age, influenced Jaime's love for photography. In 1992, Jaime's sister, Becca Sommers, was born.

Jaime attended the local public school, Meskwaki High School, in Van Horne. She was a very active student; she was the forward on the school's field hockey team, contributed to and edited the school literary magazine, was a success on debate squad, and participated in the photography club. She was popular among the students and a favorite of her professors. With neither of her parents in lucrative professions, Jaime helped contribute to the family by getting jobs around the neighborhood. She baby-sat, delivered newspapers, and was hired as a host and waitress at a family-style restaurant called Jelly's Eatery.

A year before Jaime was to graduate high school, Madeline was diagnosed with malignant stage II breast cancer. Jaime, who always believed her parents' busy life on the road prevented Madeline from getting an earlier diagnosis, quit most of her extracurricular activities to help care for her mom. Her grades slowly began to suffer, but she managed to graduate in the top 7% of her class in 2001. She was accepted into Harvard University, where she hoped to study Irish literature. When her mother's condition worsened, Jaime threw aside her plans for college to stay close to her. She continued to work, but became more and more involved as a caretaker for her mother.

In 2004, after a lengthy battle with cancer, Madeline Jo Sommers died. Immediately after the funeral, Jaime left for the west coast, leaving Becca behind. Upon her arrival on the west coast, Jaime quickly found herself a cramped apartment in a college town and a job working at a local bar. She enrolled in the psychology program at the nearby college and was able to afford tuition since she had saved up a little bit of money while taking care of her mother. In a bioethics class she took as an elective a few semesters later, she met a highly regarded professor, Dr. Will Anthros, whom she eventually started dating.

Tracking Jaime down, Becca showed up on her doorstep in 2006 with a duffel bag of a few belongings, asking to stay with her. Jaime allowed Becca to move in, but again the need to provide for her family, this time her sister, forced Jaime to drop out of college.

Following a nearly fatal car accident, Will arranges for Jaime to receive cybernetic implants, known as bionics. These implants replace both her legs and her right arm, which give her superhuman strength and speed. She also has a bionic ear which allows her to hear at low volumes, at different bandwidths to most humans, and over uncommonly long distances, as well as a bionic eye that gives her 2000/20 vision and mathematical analysis of objects, their speeds, trajectories and so forth. Sommers' rebuilt body contains "anthrocites", a nanite-like technology that causes rapid healing of physical wounds. The fourth episode confirms that Sommers can feel pain through her bionic limbs, such as when she accidentally damages a toe after a jump.

Subsequent episodes of Bionic Woman have revealed that Sommers has additional bionic components, including a tracking system implanted in her brain that allows her supervisors to see through her bionic eye and track her location, although Sommers subsequently learns how to disable this feature at will.

The reimagined version of Sommers is recruited by a covert anti-terrorist organization and early episodes of the series have shown her training to be an agent, while trying to uncover who within the agency is actually trustworthy. Meanwhile, Sommers has to balance her life as a secret agent with being a surrogate mother to her rebellious 15-year-old sister, whom she has taken care of since the death of their mother and abandonment by their father.

Early episodes have revealed assorted information: Will Anthros, whose father invented bionics, is apparently shot to death by Sarah Corvus, a renegade and the first Bionic Woman. After his funeral in the second episode, Jaime Sommers discovers he had kept a secret dossier on her dating back two years which contained her IQ test results, photos and personal history. In the series' fourth episode, Sommers discovers that her bionic systems have a maximum five-year life span. She is also for the first time shown experiencing bionic-hand tremors similar to that exhibited by Corvus, whose first-generation bionics are shown to be slowly failing, affecting her physical and mental health. The fourth episode also reveals that Jaime is afraid of flying.

Jaime is depicted as refusing to kill, at one point refusing an order to perform an assassination by sniper rifle and finding an alternative. At another point, however, she encourages her partner Antonio to take a kill shot to neutralize a target.

== Character origin ==
In 1972 the speculative fiction novel Cyborg was published by Martin Caidin. The book was later adapted into a television movie in 1973, and later into a television series from 1974 to 1978, with the title The Six Million Dollar Man. A multi-episode arc of the show introduced the character of Jaime Sommers (played by Lindsay Wagner), a woman who received bionic implants after a near-fatal accident much like Steve Austin in The Six Million Dollar Man (Sommers was a new character created for television; she did not originate in Caidin's novels and thus was considered the creation of writer Kenneth Johnson). The episode arc received very high ratings which led the producers to create a spin-off series produced by Johnson, with Lindsay Wagner reprising the role of Jaime Sommers as the star of the show. Although Caidin was not involved in the creation of the character, the fact the spin-off series used his concept of bionics as well as featured several characters that Caidin did create, he received a credit on the series.

The re-imagined series Bionic Woman, conceived and produced by David Eick, alters the character of the bionic woman, starring Michelle Ryan as a re-imagined and more contemporary Jaime Sommers. Neither Johnson, nor Caidin receive screen credit in this version.

== Critical reaction ==
The original Jaime Sommers was considered a feminist icon, described by Time magazine as "the most appealing argument for feminism" in 1977, as well as a "latter day Wonder Woman," referring to the DC Comics superheroine. The Bionic Woman had been of an era where "The ERA (Equal Rights Amendment) movement was very much alive," according to the new series' producer, David Eick. "Bionic Woman was the first television show where the ... female was not the wife of or the girlfriend of or the mother of the guy." Despite these accolades, others note the inherent contradiction among the feminist characters of the 1970s, such as Jaime Sommers, Lynda Carter's Wonder Woman and the Charlie's Angels—that these women are objectified by men in order to relay a "lipgloss feminist" message.

The new incarnation has been criticized by television analysts as more of a gender-stereotypes portrayal than the original, citing that Sommers is no longer an independent careerwoman (tennis pro and teacher) but rather a college dropout and bartender, who despite being described as having a very high IQ is otherwise in no position to be the "ultimate women's lib heroine" the original had been. Lindsay Wagner, the original Bionic Woman, described the new series as "dark and broody and violent." Describing the new Jaime, Michelle Ryan comments that "She is a strong, feisty female character… She has a vulnerability to her. She's very warm and compassionate. I think she has high morals. She always questions things. She says, 'We're the good guys, and I don't think that's right." Ryan continues describing the character, adding "She's a real tomboy as well. She's real. I think she's very grounded, and she has a good heart, but she also has an edge to her as well."

Parallels are drawn between the new Jaime and her 1990s female action hero predecessors, some commentators remarking on a likeness to Buffy Summers, protagonist of supernatural drama Buffy the Vampire Slayer, in the sense that she has been unwillingly given a superhuman burden. This also extends to the relationship between Jaime and her foil and antagonist, her tragic nemesis Sarah Corvus, which has been described by reviewers as sharing similarities with the Buffy/Faith dynamic in Buffy the Vampire Slayer. Other commentators mention that the relationship between Jaime and the Bionics program director Jonas Bledsoe parallels that of Buffy and her mentor Giles, much as the Berkut Group serves similar functions within the storyline as the Watcher's Council does in Buffy: that of patriarchal oppressors.

== See also ==
- Woman warrior
- List of women warriors in folklore
