= Bionic Woman =

Bionic Woman may refer to:

- "The Bionic Woman", a 1975 episode of The Six Million Dollar Man
- The Bionic Woman, a television series that aired from 1976 to 1978 on ABC and NBC
- Bionic Woman (2007 TV series), a 2007 remake of the series on NBC
- Jaime Sommers (The Bionic Woman), the main character in both series

== See also ==
- Bionicle
- Bionics
- The Bionic Man (comics)
- "The Bionic Pac-Woman", a 1982 episode of Pac-Man
- "The Cryonic Woman", a 2000 episode of Futurama
