= Marooned (novel) =

1964 novel by Martin Caidin

- First edition
- Author: Martin Caidin
- Language: English
- Genre: Science fiction
- Publisher: Dutton (US); Hodder and Stoughton (UK)
- Publication date: 1964
- Publication place: United States
- English publication date: June 1964
- Media type: Paperback
- Pages: 378
- ISBN: 9997405307

Marooned is a 1964 science fiction thriller novel by American writer Martin Caidin, about a crewed spacecraft stranded in Earth orbit, oxygen running out, and only an experimental craft available to attempt a rescue. A film based on the novel led Caidin to prepare a revised version of it in 1968. The film was released in 1969, four months after the Apollo 11 mission, with the revised novel sold by book stores a few weeks earlier.

== 1964 version ==
The first edition of the novel Marooned opens with the central character, Major Richard "Dick" Pruett, attempting to come to terms with his impending doom. Pruett, an astronaut in the Mercury-Atlas IV program, is in orbit alone. His engines have failed to fire for re-entry and he is stranded in orbit, where he faces death due to asphyxiation as he depletes the on-board supply of oxygen. The story goes into an extended flashback that reviews Pruett's development as a US Air Force fighter test pilot and training as an astronaut.

As Pruett reviews his life, a friend of his in the astronaut corps, Jim Dougherty, refuses to accept that all is lost. He pushes NASA officials to mount a rescue mission using the prototype of a new spacecraft in development, the two-man Gemini.

The challenges are formidable. The rescue mission must be prepared and launched in a matter of mere days. Dougherty must fly the untested Gemini spacecraft solo, achieve a rendezvous with the Mercury vessel stranded in orbit, get Pruett on board the new spacecraft in the empty co-pilot's seat, and return to Earth. (At the time the novel was written, none of these tasks – Gemini launch, rendezvous or EVA – had been attempted.)

As NASA scrambles to prepare and launch the rescue mission, the Soviets secretly make their own plans to rescue Pruett first, rushing to send a cosmonaut aloft in a Vostok spacecraft. (In this version, the Soviets have already achieved the orbital objectives of rendezvous, docking and extravehicular activity [EVA]; in real life the Soviets did not achieve all these milestones until 1969.) Ultimately Dougherty succeeds in his mission and rescues Pruett; cosmonaut Andrei Yakovlev in the Vostok does rendezvous with the Mercury and provides assistance in the rescue (by using high-intensity spotlights to improve visibility) but does not take an active physical role in it. The novel ends with all three spacemen returning safely to Earth.

== 1968-69 version ==
Novelization of Marooned, written in 1969 by Martin Caidin and based on the movie of the same name.

In 1969 a film based on the novel, also entitled Marooned, was released. The year coincided with the first Moon landings and public interest in human space flight was high. By 1969, both the Mercury and Gemini programs had passed into history. Plans were being made for the Apollo Applications Program, a series of missions to take place after the Moon missions. Flights would take place in Earth orbit and make use of the Apollo and Saturn V hardware. Among the applications planned was the first American space station, made from a converted Saturn V S-4B booster stage. (The station and its associated missions would acquire the name Skylab, with missions flown 1973–74.) The film's plot remained the same as the 1964 book but the story was revised to make the space hardware and mission plans current.

With the advent of the film, Caidin prepared a significantly revised version of the novel as a tie-in to coincide with the film. An idiosyncratic book, the revision is part original novel and part novelization, its major alterations of plot and character adapted from the screenplay by Mayo Simon, which re-imagined the story along more then-contemporary lines; in keeping with this, Simon gets screenplay byline credit on the cover and title page of the new edition, as well as specific acknowledgement from Caidin in a foreword. (In all likelihood, Caidin was approached by Bantam Books [who had published the paperback edition of the original and were a prolific publisher of novelizations] to revise the novel, but it's also possible he approached Bantam with the notion, upon reading the screenplay.)

The revision concerns three US astronauts—Jim Pruett, "Buzz" Lloyd and Clayton "Stoney" Stone—stranded in an Apollo spacecraft named Ironman One. Pruett's back story was also rewritten to include a wife; in the 1964 version, Dick Pruitt was single. With the crew launched on a planned seven-month mission docked to the S-4B workshop, ground controllers, including NASA Director Charles Keith, decide to terminate the flight two months early as Lloyd begins showing signs of fatigue and deteriorating performance.

The astronauts have separated from the station; now, with the Apollo main engine inoperative, they have insufficient fuel to return to the station. Pruett's friend, now named Ted Dougherty, plans a rescue mission using an experimental X-RV lifting body spacecraft, an early study for the Space Shuttle orbiter. The X-RV will be mounted on a Titan III-C rocket reassigned for the purpose.

In the revised novel the Soviet plans involve a Soyuz spacecraft. Caidin named the flight "Soyuz 11". (The real-life Soyuz 11 mission, in 1971, ended in tragedy when all three cosmonauts perished during re-entry while returning from Salyut 1, the first occupied space station.) The film's screenplay was less current on this detail, referring to the Russian spacecraft as a Voskhod. In this version, Pruett dies in open space while trying to fix the Ironman; Lloyd and Stone are rescued. In a departure from the 1964 version, cosmonaut Andrei Yakovlev actually does physically assist Dougherty in an EVA rescuing the Ironman astronauts.

The 1969 version also features Dougherty's launch in the Titan IIIC being through the eye of a hurricane, after an earlier attempt, which might have been in time to save all three astronauts, is scrubbed at T-59 seconds by excessive wind conditions. In the 1964 version, Dougherty's launch is in uneventful conditions.

== Title references ==
Caidin makes a brief appearance in the film as a reporter describing the arrival of the X-RV at Cape Canaveral. He made Marooned the subject of a self-reference in a later novel, Cyborg IV. The main character, Steve Austin, says of a situation: "A friend of mine wrote about it. Did you ever read the book Marooned?"

Astronaut Jim Lovell and his wife Marilyn Lovell referred to the film years later in a special interview. Their recollection is shared as a feature on the DVD release of Apollo 13, a 1995 film directed by Ron Howard. The couple describes a 1969 film (never named) in which an astronaut "named Jim" faces mortal peril in an Apollo spacecraft. The couple describe the way the film gave Lovell's wife nightmares. Her experience inspired a dream sequence in Apollo 13 that recalls the 1960s-vintage cinematic look of Marooned.

== Sources ==
- Caidin, Martin (1970). Marooned: a novel. London: Corgi. ISBN 0-552-08370-4.
