= Jaime Sommers =

Jaime Sommers may refer to:

- Jaime Sommers (The Bionic Woman), the main character in the original 1970s television series
- Jaime Sommers (Bionic Woman), the main character in the 2007 television series

== See also ==
- Jamie Summers, American adult film actress
