= Cyborg IV =

1975 novel by Martin Caidin

- First edition
- Author: Martin Caidin
- Language: English
- Series: Cyborg a.k.a. The Six Million Dollar Man
- Genre: Science fiction novel
- Publisher: Arbor House
- Publication date: 1975
- Publication place: United States
- Media type: Print (hardback & paperback)
- Preceded by: High Crystal

Cyborg IV is a science fiction/secret agent novel by Martin Caidin that was first published in 1975. It was the fourth and final book in a series of novels Caidin began in 1972 with Cyborg, profiling the adventures of astronaut Steve Austin, who becomes a spy for the American government after an accident that requires the replacement of numerous body parts with high-powered machines.

Cyborg IV was published after Caidin's original novel was adapted into a television series entitled The Six Million Dollar Man. Confusingly, its first paperback publication by Warner Books was issued as Volume 6 in Warners' Six Million Dollar Man book series (the only other Caidin work to be published in this series was High Crystal), even though Caidin's Cyborg continuity is separate from that of the other Six Million Dollar Man-branded novels by authors such as Mike Jahn and Jay Barbree which were novelizations based upon teleplays.

== Plot summary ==
In Cyborg IV, Caidin takes the notion of cyborg to new extremes as Steve Austin's consciousness is hooked up to a next generation spacecraft, creating a new form of union between man and machine. Meanwhile, an enemy force plans to use similar technology for their own ends.
