= The God Machine (novel) =

1968 novel by Martin Caidin

- First edition cover
- Author: Martin Caidin
- Cover artist: Robert Korn
- Language: English
- Genre: Science fiction novel
- Publisher: E.P. Dutton
- Publication date: March 29, 1968
- Publication place: United States
- Media type: Print (Hardback & Paperback)
- Pages: 316

The God Machine is a science-fiction novel by American writer Martin Caidin first published in 1968. Set in the near future, the novel tells the story of a top-secret cybernetic technician, Steve Rand, one of the brains behind Project 79, a top-secret US government project dedicated to creating artificial intelligence. Rand survives an attempt on his life before he realizes that Project 79 has gained sentience and is trying to control the minds of humans and take over the world. Assisted by a security agent and a mathematician, Rand sets out to destroy Project 79 before it is too late.

This early work by Caidin includes a discussion of bionics, the replacement of human body parts with machinery. Caidin revisited this theme a few years later in his novel, Cyborg, which was eventually adapted into the 1970s television series The Six Million Dollar Man.

== See also ==
- Society of the Mind
