= Bionic Woman (2007 TV series) =

2007 TV series

- Genre: Science fiction
- Created by: David Eick
- Starring: Michelle Ryan; Miguel Ferrer; Molly Price; Lucy Hale; Will Yun Lee; Chris Bowers; Mark Sheppard
- Country of origin: United States
- Original language: English
- No. of seasons: 1
- No. of episodes: 8

Production
- Executive producers: David Eick; Laeta Kalogridis; Jason Smilovic
- Production locations: Vancouver, British Columbia, Canada
- Running time: 42 minutes
- Production companies: GEP Productions; David Eick Productions; NBC Universal Television Studio (episodes 1–5); Universal Media Studios (episodes 6–8)

Original release
- Network: NBC
- Release: September 26 – November 28, 2007

Related
- The Bionic Woman (1976–1978); The Six Million Dollar Man

Bionic Woman is an American science fiction drama television series that aired on NBC from September 26 to November 28, 2007, which was created by David Eick, under NBC Universal Television Studio, GEP Productions, and David Eick Productions. The series was a re-imagining of the original television series, The Bionic Woman, created by Kenneth Johnson, which in turn was based upon the novel Cyborg by Martin Caidin and its TV adaptation The Six Million Dollar Man, retaining its forebears' premise while taking on a more contemporary setting. David Eick also served as executive producer alongside Laeta Kalogridis and Jason Smilovic. Production of the series was halted due to a strike by the Writers Guild of America, causing only eight episodes to be aired. The series was then canceled as the result of low ratings.

The series revolved around bartender Jaime Sommers (played by Michelle Ryan), who is saved from death after receiving experimental medical implants. While adjusting to her new cybernetic powers and raising a rebellious younger sister, Jaime agrees to work for the Berkut Group, a quasi-governmental private organization that performed her surgery.

== Plot ==
Bartender Jaime Sommers struggles to make ends meet in San Francisco while serving as a surrogate mom to her teenage sister. Nearly killed in a car accident, Jaime is saved by a cutting-edge operation – performed by her boyfriend, Will Anthros – that repairs her body with cybernetic replacements. With extraordinary new strength, speed, and other artificially enhanced abilities, Jaime begins working for the Berkut Group, the organization responsible for her operation. In her new life Jaime must learn how to use her new abilities while working to understand the role that she has been thrust into.

Jaime's modifications include: bionic legs, a bionic right arm, a bionic right ear, a bionic right eye, and nanomachines called anthrocytes which are capable of healing her body at a highly accelerated rate and protect her natural physiology from the rigors of using bionics.

== Production ==
The first mention of a revision of the Bionic Woman series occurred in August 2002 when a story in The Hollywood Reporter indicated that the series would be produced by Team Todd: sisters Jennifer Todd and Suzanne Todd.

It was later reported that the USA Network was considering airing the series, with Jennifer Aniston being in consideration for the lead role. In October 2006, NBC Universal announced that it was bringing the project back with new producers, and reportedly a radical reworking of the original concept. The series would be written by Laeta Kalogridis (creator of the WB series Birds of Prey) and produced by David Eick. Eick commented on the new series saying, "It's a complete re-conceptualization of the title. We're using the title as a starting point, and that's all. It's going to be a meaningful departure [from the original]." In January 2007, The Hollywood Reporter reported that the series one-hour pilot was given an official greenlight by NBC. On May 10, 2007, NBC announced that they had given an early pick-up to Bionic Woman for their fall 2007 schedule.

Since the rights to the novel Cyborg by Martin Caidin were held by other parties, the new series excluded any overt elements from it (although it did not prevent the writers from giving Jaime elements of bionics from the original novel, such as a bionic eye). This was the same for the character Steve Austin from the Six Million Dollar Man, of which the original The Bionic Woman was a spin-off. Neither Kenneth Johnson nor Martin Caidin received screen credit on the new series, where they did in the original Bionic Woman. Johnson has confirmed on his website that he had no involvement with the new Bionic Woman series.

=== WGA strike ===
Due to a strike by the Writers Guild of America, production of the series was halted in mid-November 2007, and the regular actors were suspended on half-pay for a period of five weeks. At the time of the strike, the series had aired all of the episodes that were completed before production halted. Several websites ran with rumors that NBC had canceled the series, but an NBC Universal Media Studios spokesperson told the press that the show had not been canceled and that production of the first season would continue when the WGA strike ended. Upon the resolution of the strike, an Associated Press story classified Bionic Woman as being "on the bubble", and predicted that the remaining episodes would not air until the fall of 2008, "if ever". NBC later published a report regarding initial series renewals, and no announcement was made regarding whether Bionic Woman would return in the fall. The report also indicated that despite the earlier statement by NBC Universal, production of the series' first season was considered to be concluded.

== Cast ==
=== Main characters ===
- Michelle Ryan as Jaime Sommers – a bartender who is involved in a near fatal car accident and becomes the Bionic Woman.
- Miguel Ferrer as Jonas Bledsoe – a member of the Berkut Group who is responsible for Jaime and assigns her missions; the Oscar Goldman analog of the series (though his personality and ethics hew closer to that of Oliver Spencer, featured in the first Six Million Dollar Man pilot film, and who was replaced by the less-ruthless Goldman character for the remainder of that series and the original Bionic Woman).
- Molly Price as Ruth Truewell – Bledsoe's second in command.
- Will Yun Lee as Jae Kim – a specialized operations leader with the Berkut Group, and was romantically involved with Sarah Corvus.
- Lucy Hale as Becca Sommers – Jaime's teenage sister. In the unbroadcast pilot episode, the character was hearing impaired and was played by Mae Whitman, but the character was retooled and all scenes with the original actor were re-shot with the hearing impairment angle eliminated. Becca has no analog in the original series in which Jaime was an only child.
- Chris Bowers as Will Anthros – Jaime's boyfriend; he performs the operation that gives her the bionic implants, but is shot and killed by Sarah Corvus soon after. He is the analog of the original series' Dr. Rudy Wells, as well as Dr. Michael Marchetti who was a love interest for the original Jaime during her initial appearances on The Six Million Dollar Man (as well, as, superficially, Steve Austin who was Jaime's fiancée prior to her bionic operation).
- Mark Sheppard as Anthony Anthros – the father of Will Anthros and one of the original developers of the bionic implants. He escapes prison at the end of the first episode. He is a rough analog of Dr. Franklin, a villain who appeared in the "Kill Oscar" trilogy that crossed between both original series. Although intended to be a recurring character, the series left the air before he could return and further his story arc.

=== Recurring characters ===
- Katee Sackhoff as Sarah Corvus – the "first Bionic woman" and a nemesis of Jaime. Corvus' bionics are malfunctioning; she believes that Jaime's newer bionics may be the key to repairing hers. Jaime has mixed feelings about Corvus. The cancellation of the series left this character arc unresolved. The original series has no equivalent character, however The Six Million Dollar Man did feature Barney Hiller, a bionic-powered adversary similar to Corvus (an actual equivalent character similar to Corvus was created by Kevin Smith in his comic book reboot of The Six Million Dollar Man called The Bionic Man, named Avery Hull, a 'first Bionic man' who is now insane due to the nuclear fuel used to power his bionics running off into his brain-the nuclear fuel was supposed to be emptied properly, but in Hull's case, it wasn't.)
- Isaiah Washington as Antonio Pope – an advisor in the Bionics program described as an "outsider with a mysterious agenda" with the power to either help Jamie or bring her down. Pope is shot and killed by a former colleague at the end of the seventh episode. He is a rough analog of Chris Williams, Jaime's OSI mission partner, from the final season of the original series.
- Kevin Rankin as Nathan – one of the Bionic team members. He works as a technician and routinely monitors Jamie during her missions.
- Jordan Bridges as Tom – a member of the CIA and Jaime's new boyfriend.

=== Casting ===
The pilot starred Michelle Ryan, Miguel Ferrer, Molly Price, Will Yun Lee, and Mae Whitman. In June 2007, TV Guide reported that Mae Whitman was being replaced in the role of Jaime's sister. An NBC spokesperson confirmed this, stating, "The decision was purely creatively driven. It is very common to change storylines, characters, actors after the initial pilot is shot." The character, who was originally deaf, had her hearing restored when requested by an NBC executive. Lucy Hale was later cast as Whitman's replacement in July 2007. In announcing the recasting, it was confirmed that the deaf trait of the character had been dropped. Instead, Hale's version of the character is depicted as a rebellious teen and budding computer hacker.

As Ryan is from England and naturally speaks with received pronunciation, she affects an American accent for her role as Sommers. One notable exception to this occurs in the episode "The Education of Jaime Sommers", when Jaime assumes the guise of a British exchange student, allowing Ryan to use a variation of her natural accent.

Katee Sackhoff was cast as Sarah Corvus, the first Bionic Woman, and her character subsequently appeared in four episodes of the series, in addition to the series pilot. Sackhoff has compared the role to that of Number Six, a character in Sackhoff's concurrent series, Battlestar Galactica. Sackhoff is joined by fellow Galactica co-stars Aaron Douglas as a prison guard appearing only in the series first episode, and Mark Sheppard as Will Anthros' father Anthony Anthros. Isaiah Washington appeared in five episodes of the series, making his first appearance in "Paradise Lost", the first post-pilot episode.

Bruce McGill was cast to play an as-yet-unnamed character who is a high ranking operative in the Bionics program. McGill's character had not yet appeared on the series by the time the WGA strike halted production.

=== Crew ===
David Eick, Laeta Kalogridis, Jason Smilovic and Michael Dinner originally served as executive producers and writers. Dinner also directed the pilot but exited his post as executive producer in June 2007. Glen Morgan, writer and producer on The X-Files, Space: Above and Beyond, and Millennium, joined the production team of Bionic Woman as an executive producer in May, only to leave four months later, citing creative differences. In September, Friday Night Lights executive producer Jason Katims joined the show as a consultant. Katims ran the writer's room until late October, when Sopranos veteran Jason Cahill was hired as the new showrunner.

== Broadcast history ==
Bionic Woman premiered in the United States on the NBC network on September 26, 2007, airing on Wednesday nights at 9:00/8:00c. It attained NBC's highest midweek premiere ratings since the 1999 premiere of The West Wing, and was the second most watched program in its timeslot after ABC's Grey's Anatomy spin off Private Practice. In addition to NBC, the series is broadcast on Sci Fi in Australia, E! in Canada, and in 2008 on ITV2 in the United Kingdom.

Due to the strike by the Writers Guild of America, production of the series was put on hiatus. Several media outlets reported that Bionic Woman had been canceled, although there was no official confirmation from NBC. An announcement of series renewals by NBC did not indicate the fate of Bionic Woman, although it was reported that production of the season was considered concluded.

The SyFy Portal, citing a TV Guide column, suggested that the series cast and crew had been told that production had ended, although NBC had made no official announcement as to the series' fate as of that date and the blog author stressed that the news was only a rumor. David Eick, the series' co-executive producer, confirmed on March 19, 2008, that the series had been canceled, although the network had still not officially announced it. The show's cancellation was later justified by its low ratings, with figures dropping to just 5.9 million for the last, eighth episode of the first season.

The series was subsequently not included in the Fall 2008 schedule announced by NBC in early April 2008.

== Episodes ==
No.	Title	Directed by	Written by	Original release date	US viewers (millions)
1	"Pilot"	Michael Dinner	Laeta Kalogridis	September 26, 2007	13.91
Jaime Sommers is severely injured in a car accident but saved when her boyfriend, Will Anthros, provides her with bionic implants. Now adjusting to greatly augmented speed, strength, and agility, Jaime escapes the organization that provided the operation that saved her life but is assaulted by Sarah Corvus, another recipient of bionic implants who has been attempting to kill Will. In a subplot of the episode, Will's father Anthony Anthros escapes from prison.
2	"Paradise Lost"	Tim Matheson	Jason Smilovic	October 3, 2007	11.07
Dealing with the death of Will, Jaime decides to join the group he worked for to develop her powers and put them to good use. While worrying about her sister's progressively worsening behaviour in school, Jaime starts her first assignment; Investigating an attempt to release a chemical weapon in major cities across the US. The assignment clearly draws from "Population: Zero" the first episode of The Six Million Dollar Man.
3	"Sisterhood"	Steve Boyum	David Eick	October 10, 2007	10.28
Jaime's task is to protect a Canadian defense contractor's daughter (played by Magda Apanowicz). Meanwhile, she has to decide whether to help Sarah Corvus save herself.
4	"Faceoff"	Paul Shapiro	Jon Cowan & Robert Rovner	October 17, 2007	8.62
Jaime, while on a mission to rescue an American doctor working in Paraguay, discovers the truth about her bionic lifespan.
5	"The Education of Jaime Sommers"	Jonas Pate	Elizabeth Heldens	October 24, 2007	7.81
Jaime finally gets to experience college when she goes undercover as a British transfer student (with Michelle Ryan using her own British accent) to investigate a professor who is possibly selling neural implants to terrorists. However, her assignment becomes complicated when she unexpectedly falls for Tom (Jordan Bridges), the teacher's assistant, who has been flagged as a suspect.
6	"The List"	David Boyd	Bridget Carpenter	November 7, 2007	6.48
The Berkut Group has to team up with the CIA to catch a dangerous man who is selling a list naming the Berkut Group and CIA operatives. When Jaime and Tom are partnered on the mission in Paris, they find themselves in the city of love, competing and flirting with each other, while still trying to maintain a professional relationship. Meanwhile, Becca lands herself in jail when she tries to impress a boy and Jonas has to bail her out.
7	"Trust Issues"	Alex Chapple	Kerry Ehrin	November 14, 2007	6.29
When an assassination plot of a controversial head of state on United States soil is discovered, Jonas assigns Jaime and Antonio to thwart it. But when Jaime overhears a disturbing conversation by Antonio and the assassin, she is conflicted on whether she can trust her partner, which leads to a deadly confrontation. Meanwhile, Tom and Jaime's relationship moves forward and she invites him over to the house for dinner to meet Becca.
8	"Do Not Disturb"	Gwyneth Horder-Payton	Jason Smilovic	November 28, 2007	5.93
Jaime goes into an unexpected emotional tailspin in the wake of Antonio's death, resulting in Jonas ordering her to take a vacation after completing a minor assignment in Montana, which leads to Jaime being ordered to act as an assassin for the first time.

== Reception and ratings ==
=== Critical reception ===
The series was met with a mixed reception. Mary McNamara of the Los Angeles Times wished that the episodes following the pilot were just as good as the pilot itself, and wanted Katee Sackhoff to play the lead role. Alessandra Stanley of The New York Times felt that Bionic Woman was more about "fembot martial arts and slick Matrix-ish special effects" oriented toward young male viewers "[rather] than about character development".

Tim Goodman of the San Francisco Chronicle felt that the remake was "a lot darker than the campy original", but said that "trouble lies in the casting and the concept". Goodman thought that "Ryan seems too inert, not nearly aggressive enough for the role", and that Sackhoff was "infinitely more likable as an antiheroine". He said that they either "got the wrong bionic woman", or "they need to let the bad bionic woman get a whole lot more screen time".

Michael Idato of The Age said that since the series had gone "through a series of writers and producers", it was "no surprise that what finally lands is a little messy". However he said that "despite some early uncertainty, Ryan becomes a likable Sommers, leaving only the show's dark tone and relentless pace as potential problems." He said that they were great for setting up the story, "but could become too much as the season progresses". Not all reviews were as optimistic; Michael Hinman of SyFy Portal referred to the show as "a disaster".

=== Australia ratings ===
The first episode rated 1.6 million viewers, making it the most-watched program of the night. Ratings began to dive with the third episode rating 1.2 million viewers. The fifth episode only rated one million viewers. Viewer numbers soon fell below one million. Sci Fi Australia picked up the show from Channel Seven - the first episode aired Friday, June 24, 2008, at 8:30 pm EST.

== Home video releases ==
The region 2 and 4 DVDs were titled Bionic Woman – The Complete Series and Bionic Woman – Complete Series, respectively.

Title	Set details	DVD release dates			Special features
Title	Set details	Region 1	Region 2	Region 4	Special features
Bionic Woman – Volume One	Discs: 2; Episodes: 8	March 18, 2008	May 12, 2008	June 4, 2008	Pilot commentary with executive producer David Eick; The Making of the Car Crash; Real-Life Bionics; The Stunts; Profiles
Bionic Woman – The Pilot Episode	Discs: 1; Episodes: 1	—N/a	April 7, 2008	—N/a	Also includes the pilot episodes for 30 Rock and The Black Donnellys
