= Cyborg (novel) =

1972 novel by Martin Caidin

- First edition
- Author: Martin Caidin
- Language: English
- Series: Cyborg
- Genre: Science fiction novel
- Publisher: Arbor House
- Publication date: April 1972
- Publication place: United States
- Media type: Print (hardback & paperback)
- ISBN: 0-87795-025-3 (first edition, hardback)
- OCLC: 320464
- Dewey Decimal: 813/.5/4
- LC Class: PS3553.A38
- Followed by: Operation Nuke

Cyborg is a 1972 science fiction/secret agent novel written by Martin Caidin. The novel also included elements of speculative fiction. It was adapted as the television movie The Six Million Dollar Man, followed by two sequels and a weekly series of the same name, all starring Lee Majors. The series also inspired a spin-off, The Bionic Woman.

== Plot summary ==
Cyborg is the story of astronaut and test pilot Steve Austin, who experiences a catastrophic crash during a flight, leaving him with all but one limb destroyed, blind in one eye, and with other major injuries.

At the same time, a secret part of the American government, the Office of Strategic Operations (OSO), has taken an interest in the work of Dr. Rudy Wells concerning bionics — the replacement of human body parts with mechanical prosthetics that (in the context of this novel) are more powerful than the original limbs. Wells also happens to be a good friend of Austin's, so when OSO chief Oscar Goldman "invites" (or rather, orders) Wells to rebuild Austin with bionics limbs, Wells agrees.

Steve Austin is outfitted with two new legs capable of propelling him at great speed, and a bionic left arm with almost human dexterity and the strength of a battering ram. One of the fingers of the hand incorporates a poison dart gun. His left eye is replaced with a false, removable eye that is used (in this first novel) to house a miniature camera. Other physical alterations include the installation of a steel skull plate to replace bone smashed by the crash, and a radio transmitter built into a rib. This mixture of man and machine is known as a cyborg, from which the novel gets its title.

The first half of the novel details both Austin's reaction to his original injuries — he attempts to commit suicide — and his initially resentful reaction to being rebuilt with bionic prosthetic hardware. The operation has a price: Austin is committed to working for the OSO as a reluctant agent. The second half of the novel describes Austin being teamed with an already experienced female operative, and his mission to the Middle East as both spy and weapon. Austin, already coming to appreciate his bionic implants, relies heavily on his augmentation during the mission and by the end accepts his role.

== Steve Austin series ==
Caidin's book is the first of a series. During the next few years, he wrote three more books that were, for the most part, independent of the continuity of the television series (upon which additional novels were written by other authors):

- Operation Nuke (1973)
- High Crystal (1974)
- Cyborg IV (1975)

None of the sequels to Cyborg were adapted for the television series.

== Adaptations ==
=== Television ===
During 1973, Cyborg was adapted as a 90-minute, made-for-television movie titled The Six Million Dollar Man. The movie begins with a computerized text scroll explaining the term "cyborg" and since the word "CYBORG" is the first word seen on screen, some sources, including the ABC network's own promotions for the movie and later DiscoVision home video release, give the full title as Cyborg: The Six Million Dollar Man.

The movie starred Lee Majors as Austin alongside Martin Balsam as Rudy Wells. The name of the OSO (Office of Scientific Operations) officer backing Austin's "rebuilding" was changed from Oscar Goldman to Oliver Spencer (played by Darren McGavin). Spencer is portrayed as having a limp and constant pain. (The OSO chief is still named McKay as in the novel, though now a middle-aged woman) Real-life footage of the Northrop M2-F2 test-plane crash was incorporated into the movie to depict Austin's accident.

The first half of the movie follows Cyborg fairly well, including Austin's initial suicide attempt and Wells's reluctance to operate on his friend. The second half of the movie differs from the novel, with Austin dropped into a remote part of Saudi Arabia on a solo mission and ordered to rescue a prisoner from a group of extremists, a mission later revealed to be a test of Austin's abilities.

The movie was a ratings success. A second movie, titled Wine, Women and War, was commissioned, but this was not based upon any of Caidin's works. For this second movie, Oscar Goldman was reinstated, with Richard Anderson signed as Goldman, but the agency was renamed the Office of Scientific Intelligence, or OSI. Alan Oppenheimer replaced Martin Balsam as Dr. Wells. A third TV movie, The Solid Gold Kidnapping, followed, after which The Six Million Dollar Man was begun as a weekly television series during 1974, running until 1978 for a total of five seasons. The original pilot movie was re-edited with new footage to make it a "flashback episode" and syndicated as the two-part "The Moon and the Desert". Author Martin Caidin, according to The Bionic Book by Herbie Pilato, served as an uncredited consultant for the series throughout its run, and ultimately made a brief appearance in one of its final-season episodes; in addition, author Jay Barbree, who collaborated with Caidin on a number of nonfiction book projects, also wrote a novel based upon the series.

During 1976, a spin-off, The Bionic Woman, was begun, playing also until 1978, for three seasons. During 1987, 1989, and 1994, three made-for-television movies reunited the casts of both series. Due to his licensing agreement with Universal Studios, Caidin received credit on all these productions, though The Bionic Woman did not originate from his books. The Bionic Woman was remade in 2007 as Bionic Woman, though few elements from the 1976-78 series were retained; elements from Cyborg, however, were incorporated, such as the imagined Jaime Sommers possessing a bionic eye - a feature invented by Caidin for Austin - and organizational similarities between the OSO of Caidin's novel and the movie, and the Berkut Group organization featured in the remake. Only nine episodes of the remake were produced.

=== Other novels ===
Despite the changes made to the character for television, when authors such as Mike Jahn and Evan Richards were commissioned to write novelizations based upon Six Million Dollar Man episodes, they chose to follow Caidin's original model of the character, which on at least one occasion changed the ending of an episode. (In the episode "Love Song For Tanya," the villain is apprehended alive by Austin; in Jahn's book International Incidents, Austin simply fires his poison dart gun at him and kills him).

=== Comic books ===
The Six Million Dollar Man produced two comic-book adaptations beginning during 1976, both from Charlton Comics — a color monthly comic and a black and white illustrated magazine. Both included condensed adaptations of the Cyborg origin story in their first issues. Also in 1976, Power Records also retold the story of Cyborg for one of its illustrated book-and-record sets.

In 2011–2012, Dynamite Comics published a new adaptation of Cyborg titled The Bionic Man, initially based on an unproduced screenplay by Kevin Smith. During 2012 the comic began featuring original stories. During 2014, Dynamite replaced this series with The Six Million Dollar Man Season Six, a limited-run series that chronicled the adventures of Steve Austin after the TV series. In 2016, this was succeeded by a mini-series, ostensibly also set after the TV series, titled Fall of Man.

== Other references ==
During the 1990s, Caidin wrote the novel Buck Rogers: A Life in the Future, based on the Buck Rogers comic strip of the 1930s. In this book, Caidin pays tribute to Cyborg by having Buck Rogers receive bionic transplants after his 500-year coma, including several direct references to Steve Austin himself.

Cyborg was not Caidin's first reference to bionics, as the concept is also discussed in his 1968 novel, The God Machine. Caidin also revisited the concept in his 1982 novel Manfac, which even included dialog that derisively referred to the Six Million Dollar Man series.
