= Marooned (1969 film) =

1969 American science fiction film by John Sturges

- Theatrical release poster
- Directed by: John Sturges
- Screenplay by: Mayo Simon
- Based on: Marooned; 1964 novel by Martin Caidin
- Produced by: M. J. Frankovich
- Starring: Gregory Peck; Richard Crenna; David Janssen; James Franciscus; Gene Hackman
- Cinematography: Daniel L. Fapp
- Edited by: Walter Thompson
- Distributed by: Columbia Pictures
- Release dates: November 10, 1969 (Premiere); December 11, 1969 (Los Angeles)
- Running time: 134 minutes
- Country: United States
- Language: English
- Budget: $8–10 million
- Box office: $4.1 million (USA/Canada rentals)

Marooned is a 1969 American science fiction film directed by John Sturges and starring Gregory Peck, Richard Crenna, David Janssen, James Franciscus, and Gene Hackman about three astronauts who are trapped and slowly suffocating in space. It was based on the 1964 novel Marooned by Martin Caidin. While the original novel was based on the single-pilot Project Mercury, the film depicted an Apollo command and service module with three astronauts and a space station resembling Skylab. Caidin acted as technical adviser and updated the novel, incorporating appropriate material from the original version.

The film was released less than four months after the Apollo 11 Moon landing, attracting enormous public attention. It was nominated for three Oscars and won an Academy Award for Best Visual Effects for Robbie Robertson.

== Plot ==
Three U.S. astronauts Commander Jim Pruett, "Buzz" Lloyd, and Dr. Clayton "Stoney" Stone are the crew of an experimental space station on an extended-duration mission. About five months into a planned seven-month mission, the crew in general and Lloyd in particular begins exhibiting erratic and substandard performance, and NASA management elects to end the mission early. While oriented for retrofire, the main engine on the spacecraft, dubbed Ironman One, fails. Mission Control determines that Ironman does not have enough fuel remaining to initiate atmospheric entry, nor to redock with the station and wait for rescue. The crew is marooned in orbit.

NASA debates whether a rescue flight can reach the crew before their oxygen runs out. No backup launch vehicles are available at Kennedy Space Center and NASA Director of Manned Spaceflight Charles Keith opposes using an experimental U.S. Air Force lifting body, the X-RV, that would be launched on an Air Force Titan IIIC booster rocket; neither the spacecraft nor the booster is man-rated. Colonel Ted Dougherty, NASA's chief astronaut, opposes Keith, claiming most time-consuming preparation items can be dismissed. The President agrees with Dougherty and tells Keith that failing to try a rescue mission will kill public support for the crewed space program. Despite his initial opposition, Keith accepts the decision, and works furiously on the rescue mission. Dougherty appoints himself as pilot.

The astronauts' wives are brought to the control room and allowed to speak to their husbands, but this exacerbates Lloyd's already-agitated condition. As launch time approaches, a hurricane heading for Cape Canaveral causes the mission to be scrubbed. While Keith addresses the news media at the Cape, a USAF weather officer informs Keith the eye of the storm will pass over the Cape 90 minutes later during a subsequent launch window, permitting enough time to launch a rescue mission.

When the eye of the hurricane passes over the Cape, the X-RV is successfully launched. However, insufficient oxygen remains for all three astronauts to survive until Dougherty arrives. Pruett and his crew debate what to do. Stone argues that they can survive by taking sleeping pills to reduce oxygen consumption, but Pruett overrides him. An agitated Lloyd offers to leave, since he is "using up most of the oxygen anyway," but Pruett overrules him as well. He orders everyone into their spacesuits and exits the ship, ostensibly to attempt repairs.

After Pruett goes on his EVA, Lloyd realizes he is planning to sacrifice himself and attempts to follow. Stone restrains Lloyd, and they both watch Pruett from the hatch. A hiss of air occurs as a large gash in Pruett's space suit is torn on a metal protrusion from the service module's S-band antenna array. Helpless to stop the leak, Pruett drifts away from the ship as Lloyd and Stone look on. With Pruett gone, Stone takes command and sedates Lloyd.

A Soviet Voskhod spacecraft suddenly appears and its cosmonaut tries to make contact. Since his ship is too small to bring the astronauts aboard, the cosmonaut attempts to bring oxygen to the Apollo spacecraft. Stone and Lloyd, suffering oxygen deprivation, do not understand the cosmonaut's gestures or Keith's instructions from Houston. Lloyd drifts out of the hatch and away from the ship. Dougherty arrives in the X-RV and retrieves Lloyd using a maneuvering pack. The cosmonaut moves into the Apollo spacecraft and attaches an oxygen tank onto Stone's suit. Dougherty transfers the two surviving Ironman astronauts into the rescue ship. After separating, both the Soviet ship and the X-RV execute retrofire to return to Earth, and the final scene fades out with a view of the abandoned Ironman One adrift in orbit.

== Cast ==
- Gregory Peck as Charles Keith
- Richard Crenna as Jim Pruett
- David Janssen as Ted Dougherty
- James Franciscus as Clayton Stone
- Gene Hackman as Buzz Lloyd
- Lee Grant as Celia Pruett
- Nancy Kovack as Teresa Stone
- Mariette Hartley as Betty Lloyd
- Scott Brady as Public Affairs Officer
- Frank Marth as Air Force Systems Director
- Craig Huebing as Flight Director
- John Carter as Flight Surgeon
- Walter Brooke as Network Commentator
- Vincent Van Lynn as Aerospace Journalist
- George Gaynes as Mission Director
- John Forsythe as U. S. President (uncredited; voice only)
- Tom Stewart as Houston Capcom
- Bill Couch as Soviet Cosmonaut (uncredited)

Cast Notes

- Martin Caidin, the author of the book on which the movie was based and a technical advisor for the film, makes a brief appearance in the film as a reporter describing the arrival of the X-RV at Cape Canaveral.

== Production ==
An earlier version of the film (based on the 1964 version of the novel) was in preproduction in 1965, with Frank Capra producing and directing, from a screenplay by Walter Newman.

At this stage, NASA's head of public affairs, Julian Scheer, while promoting improved openness in the agency's dealings with the media, nevertheless tried to prevent NASA from providing help to the filmmakers. He wrote in an internal memorandum, "It would be better for the agency's standpoint if this picture was never made" because of the spacecraft failure and threat of death in space it would portray.

Capra heavily revised the script while seeking funding from investors, to reduce the budget. Amid concerns about the size of the project, Columbia Pictures' M. J. Frankovich offered Capra $3 million to make the film, prompting him to abandon development. When Marooned was eventually produced with John Sturges as director and Mayo Simon as screenwriter, the budget was $8 million.

The film eschewed a traditional score for a soundscape created by sound engineer Arthur Piantadosi. He used a quarter-inch Nagra tape machine to record various samples that he manipulated into the sounds heard in the film. High Fidelity called it the 1969 "score of the year". Along with Les Fresholtz, Piantadosi was nominated for an Academy Award for Best Sound.

Given that Apollo missions were being watched regularly by television audiences, the look of the film being as authentic as possible was very important to the producers. NASA, and its primary contractors such as North American Aviation and Philco-Ford, helped with the design of the film's hardware, including the crew's chairs inside the capsule, the orbiting laboratory—which used an early mock-up of the Skylab concept—the service module, the actual Plantronics headsets worn by the actors in the spacecraft, as well as authentic replicas of actual facilities, such as the Mission Operations Control Room (MOCR) at Johnson Space Center in Houston and the Air Force Launch Control Center (AFLCC) at Cape Canaveral Air Force Station. Contractors' technicians also worked on the film.

The Apollo Command Module used in making the film was an actual "boilerplate" version of the "Block I" Apollo spacecraft; no Block I ever flew with a crew aboard, mainly due to the Apollo 1 fire exposing over a thousand defects. While the Block II series had a means of rapidly opening the hatch, the Block I did not (a major factor in the Apollo 1 fire), and the interior set was constructed using the boilerplate as a model. To blow the hatch in the movie, Buzz pulls on a handle attached to a hinge.

Astronaut Jim Lovell and his wife Marilyn Lovell referred to the film years later in a special interview. Their recollection is shared as a feature on the DVD release of Apollo 13, a 1995 film directed by Ron Howard. The couple describes a 1969 film—never specifically named—in which an astronaut in an Apollo spacecraft "named Jim" faces mortal peril. The couple says the film gave Lovell's wife nightmares. Her experience inspired a dream sequence in Apollo 13.

Some discrepancies exist between real-life procedures and what is shown in the film. For instance, several scenes show various people communicating directly with the astronauts in space. In actuality, only CAPCOM (an astronaut) and astronauts' wives would have been permitted to communicate with the spacecraft, all others in MOCR and AFLCC would only be able to communicate on the internal network or to their respective backroom teams. Conspicuously absent from the film is any person resembling a flight director. In real life, "Flight" is in charge of a space mission during that director's shift. The filmmakers felt that adding a flight director would distract from the interpersonal dynamic between Keith and Dougherty.

== Release ==
Marooned had its premiere on November 10, 1969, in Washington, DC, during the National Association of Theatre Owners convention. The film opened at the Egyptian Theatre in Los Angeles on December 11, 1969. Its New York premiere on December 17, 1969, at the Ziegfeld Theatre was the first film shown at the new theatre.

The film was still on release in some US cities during the Apollo 13 mission in April 1970, and exhibitors considered pulling the film from release depending on the outcome of the mission. However, the distributors used the interest in the subject to expand its distribution, putting it back on release in New York theaters.

Marooned was nominated for Academy Awards in three categories: Les Fresholtz and Arthur Piantadosi for Best Sound, Robbie Robertson for Visual Effects, and Daniel L. Fapp for Cinematography. Robertson won the Oscar for his work on the film's special effects.

== Reception ==
The film grossed $43,500 in its first week at the Egyptian Theater on Hollywood Boulevard in Los Angeles, California.

In a review for The New York Times, Howard Thompson applauded the movie as "Leanly structured, crisply performed, beautifully directed, and admirably intelligent all the way," bemoaning only an intermission that "severs the tension and cripples the dramatic crescendo" and a climax that "seems curiously antiseptic" and lacks "a vital, culminative wallop."

Roger Ebert of The Chicago Sun-Times gave the film 3 stars out of 4.Marooned had solid performances from the lead actors (especially Hackman) and “works very nicely as an entertainment”, but Ebert also believed the film suffered from comparisons to the vastly superior effects in 2001: A Space Odyssey released the same year and also said parts of Marooned seemed unrealistic to audiences “who had learned a thing or two about space” from watching televised NASA rocket launches.

== Legacy ==
During the preliminary discussions for the Apollo–Soyuz Test Project, the film was discussed as a means of alleviating Soviet suspicion. One purpose of the mission was to develop and test capabilities for international space rescue.

Film Ventures International reissued the feature with the title Space Travelers and licensed this version for the fourth season of Mystery Science Theater 3000, initially broadcast in June 1992.

== See also ==
- Apollo 13, a 1995 film dramatizing the Apollo 13 incident
- List of American films of 1969
- List of films featuring space stations
- Survival film
