= Moon Shot =

Book by Alan Shepard

- Authors: Alan Shepard, Deke Slayton, Jay Barbree, and Howard Benedict
- Language: English
- Subject: Autobiography
- Publisher: Turner Publishing
- Publication date: 1994
- Publication place: United States
- Pages: 383
- ISBN: 1-878685-54-6
- Dewey Decimal: 629.454

Moon Shot: The Inside Story of America's Race to the Moon is a 1994 book written by Mercury Seven astronaut Alan Shepard, with NBC News correspondent Jay Barbree and Associated Press space writer Howard Benedict. Astronaut Donald K. "Deke" Slayton is also listed as an author, although he died before the project was completed and was an author in name only; astronaut Neil Armstrong wrote the introduction.

== Miniseries ==
The book was turned into a four part television documentary miniseries that aired on TBS in the United States in 1994. The miniseries was narrated by Barry Corbin (as Slayton) and featured interviews with several American astronauts as well as a few Russian cosmonauts. Slayton died before the miniseries completed production in 1993 and the miniseries is dedicated to his memory.
