= Robbie Robertson (visual effects artist) =

American screenwriter and visual effects artist (1931–2019)

- Born: June 22, 1931; United States
- Died: March 8, 2019 (aged 87); United States
- Occupations: Screenwriter, visual effects artist

Robbie Robertson (June 22, 1931 – June 22, 2019) was an American screenwriter and visual effects artist. He won an Academy Award in the category Best Visual Effects for the film Marooned.

== Selected filmography ==
- Marooned (1969)
