= Jay Barbree =

American journalist (1933–2021)

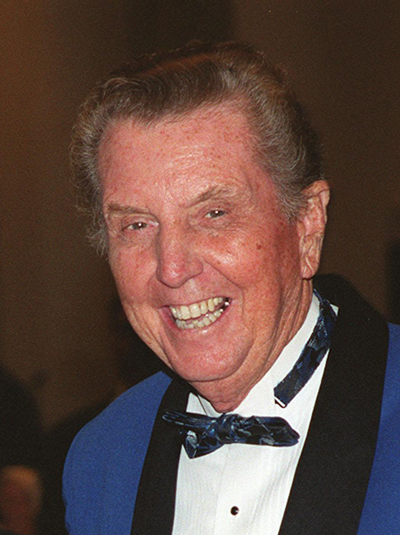
- Barbree in 2000, as Master of Ceremonies at the 50th anniversary of rocket launches from Cape Canaveral
- Born: November 26, 1933; Blakely, Georgia, U.S.
- Died: May 14, 2021 (aged 87); Merritt Island, Florida, U.S.
- Occupations: News broadcaster, reporter, author
- Years active: 1957–2017
- Spouse: Jo Barbree (née Reisinger) (m. 1960)
- Children: 3
- Awards: 1995: NASA Award – for being the only journalist to have covered all 100 crewed spaceflights.

Jay Barbree (November 26, 1933 – May 14, 2021) was an American correspondent for NBC News, focusing on space travel. He was the only journalist to have covered every non-commercial human space mission in the United States, beginning with the first American in space, Alan Shepard aboard Freedom 7 in 1961, continuing through to the last mission of the Space Shuttle, Atlantis's STS-135 mission in July 2011. He was present for all 135 Space Shuttle launches, and every crewed launch for the Mercury, Gemini, and Apollo eras. In all, he witnessed 166 human space launches.

== Early life ==
Barbree grew up on his family's farm in Early County, Georgia, and entered the United States Air Force in 1950, when he was 16 years of age. Following the Air Force, Barbree began his broadcast journalism career at WALB in Albany, Georgia, where, in 1957, he saw Sputnik's spent booster rocket orbiting in the sky and then wrote radio and television reports about the Soviet Union's launch of the first artificial satellite.

== Career ==
=== Reporting ===
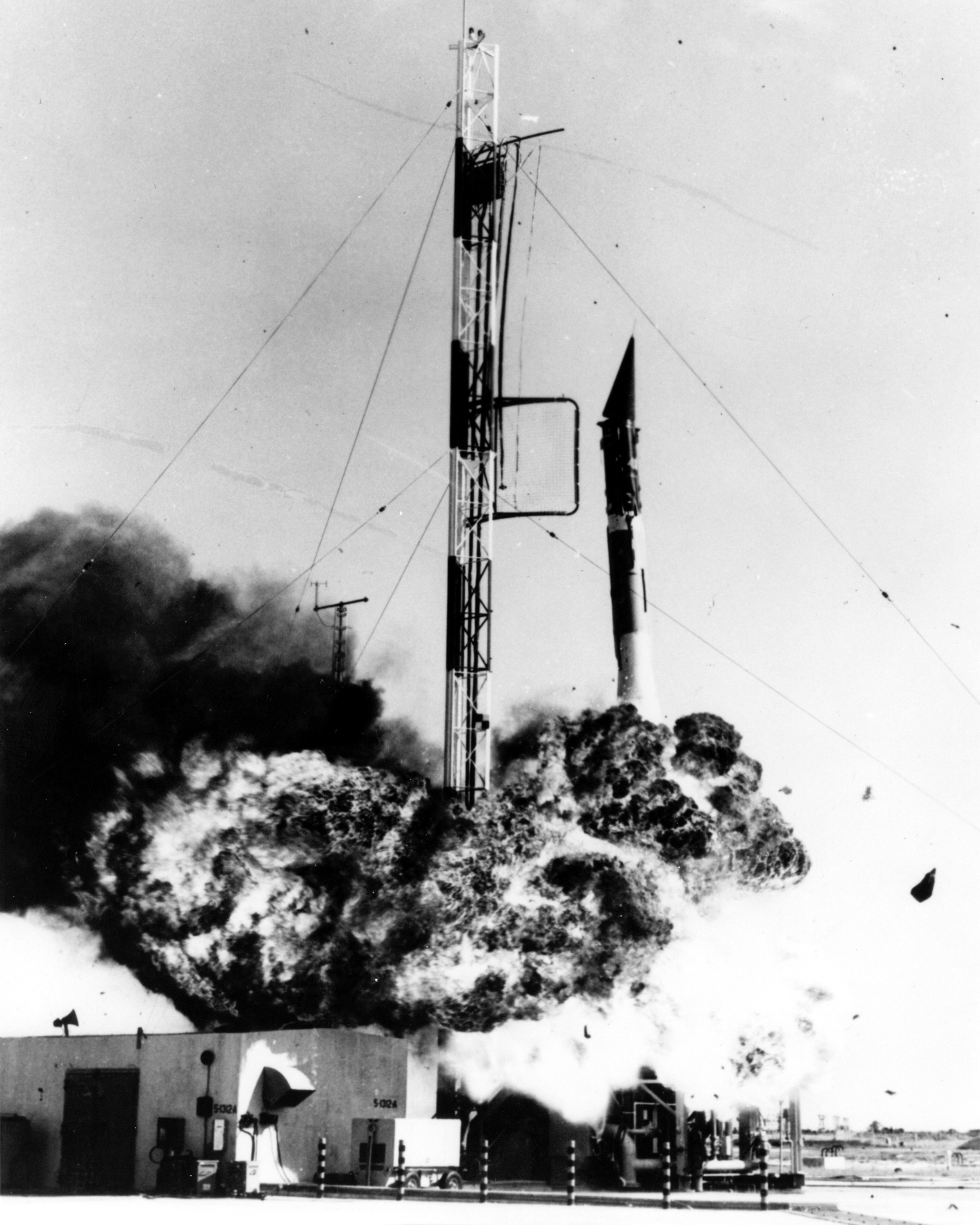
Vanguard TV-3 exploded within seconds of launch on December 6, 1957.

Barbree was so interested in the space program that he paid for his ticket to get to Cape Canaveral in Florida in 1957 to watch the attempted Vanguard TV-3 launch. The failed launch was one Barbree did not forget: "There's ignition. We can see the flames", Barbree reported. "Vanguard's engine is lit and it's burning. But wait... wait a moment, there's... there's no liftoff! It appears to be crumbling in its own fire... It's burning on the pad... Vanguard has crumbled into flames. It failed ladies and gentlemen, Vanguard has failed".

Early the following year, he returned and witnessed the successful launch of Explorer 1 on January 31, 1958, all the while calling in his reports to WALB. Eventually, Barbree was hired by radio station WEZY in Cocoa Beach, Florida and worked as a traffic reporter, covering the space program as well.

Six months later, Barbree joined NBC as a part-time space program reporter, eventually moving to full-time. Over the years, Barbree had been offered the opportunity to move to Washington, D.C., or New York City, but he turned down every offer, preferring to stay and report on what had quickly become his passion, spaceflight: "This is a job where ... you have to be, whether you like it or not, a certain member of the space family".

In 1958, while in a restroom, Barbree overheard a general and a NASA official talking about an upcoming launch called "Project SCORE", one of the earliest American satellites. This would become one of Barbree's many scoops when after a bit of digging, he found that President Dwight D. Eisenhower would use the satellite to broadcast a pre-recorded Christmas message from outer space. When SCORE launched in 1958, Barbree broadcast the story, knowing the military would not deny it once the satellite was in space.

In the space program's early days, astronauts and reporters would often socialize in Cocoa Beach and had a very different relationship than they do today. Barbree described his relationship with the astronauts as a friend and confidant, often going out to dinner with them or socializing when they were in town. In his book, Barbree wrote that in 1961, Alan Shepard told him an "off the record" fact: he was going to be the first American astronaut in space. Barbree noted that if he were to report this, it would jeopardize the friendships and possibly his career, so he said nothing. Barbree also recounts a conversation with Gus Grissom about the astronaut's concerns regarding Apollo not long before the fatal Apollo 1 fire. Barbree's association with the astronauts had some unexpected bonuses as well: Neil Armstrong carried a gold coin to the Moon on Apollo 11 for Barbree, and Pete Conrad flew several flags and patches on Apollo 12, which Barbree later handed out to friends.

In the early 1980s, when NASA developed the Teacher in Space program, a similar initiative, Journalist in Space, was developed. Barbree was one of forty finalists to be selected as a Journalist in Space.

In 1986, following the Space Shuttle Challenger accident, Barbree placed a telephone call to a friend and retired employee of NASA, who — as a favor to Barbree — went to Kennedy Space Center, looked over the accident information and analysis being done, and reported the early findings to Barbree. Consequently, Barbree was the first journalist to report on the source of the destruction of the Space Shuttle Challenger: faulty O-rings. He was also part of the NBC News Space Unit that won an Emmy award for NBC's coverage of the Apollo 11 Moon landing. Following the 2003 Space Shuttle Columbia accident, Barbree was the first reporter to break the news of an internal NASA memo expressing concerns about foam striking the orbiter's left wing during ascent.

In 1995, NASA recognized him as the "only journalist known to have covered all 100 flights". Among those present for the ceremony were several NASA officials, Alan Shepard, and Space Shuttle commander Robert L. Gibson.

In 2011, Barbree was honored by the Space Foundation as a recipient of the Douglas S. Morrow Public Outreach Award in recognition of the role he played in shaping the way the nation views and understands space.

Barbree was one of the longest-serving network correspondents to work continuously on a single subject. He started working for NBC on July 21, 1958, covering the space program and remained on that beat until his retirement in 2017. He never missed a mission launch, despite suffering a heart attack while jogging along Cocoa Beach in 1987, and being declared clinically dead for several minutes. Following his heart attack, he had bypass surgery and still did not miss any launches.

In 2018, Barbree received NASA's Chroniclers Award with his name added to The Chroniclers wall at the Kennedy Space Center Press Site. His name, however, was later removed.

=== Writing ===
Barbree was the author or coauthor of eight books, including two memoirs. In 1993, Shepard, fellow Mercury astronaut Deke Slayton, journalist Howard Benedict, and Barbree collaborated to write the book Moon Shot: The Inside Story of America's Race to the Moon. Slayton was a participant in name only and died before the book was completed.

Barbree's book Live from Cape Canaveral: Covering the Space Race, from Sputnik to Today was released on August 28, 2007, to coincide with the 50th anniversary of spaceflight, which began with the Sputnik 1 launch on October 4, 1957. The foreword is written by Tom Brokaw. Barbree's book attempts to illustrate how the media has changed in their coverage of the space programs, from early enthusiasm to relative disinterest. Barbree said he wrote the book because as he looked back over his career when recalling all the people he had worked with, very few were left. "There are an awful lot of guys ... who were here for the early days, and they're no longer here ... So I thought, well, if that story is going to be told, I've got to do it". He said that he stayed away from sensationalizing the space program, or those associated with it. He commented that he would not put some items that could be considered harmful into his newest book, stating, "The whole idea of the book is not to hurt somebody". Barbree attempts to illustrate this in his memoir by telling of a private investigator who approached him with an audio tape which allegedly contained proof of an extramarital affair involving an astronaut. Barbree told the investigator he would speak to his superiors, but then erased the tape.

Barbree also collaborated with Martin Caidin on several non-fiction works, such as Destination Mars: In Art, Myth and Science (Penguin, 1997, ISBN 978-0-670-86020-3) and A Journey Through Time: Exploring the Universe with the Hubble Space Telescope (Penguin, 1995, ISBN 0-670-86018-2). Barbree also wrote the novelization of "Pilot Error", an episode of The Six Million Dollar Man, a television series based upon Caidin's novel Cyborg (Warner, 1975, ISBN 0-446-76835-9).

== Personal life ==
Barbree married Jo Reisinger, whom he met while covering her participation in Florida beauty pageants, in 1960. They lived in Merritt Island. They had three children: Steve, Alicia, and Karla. Their son Scott died in infancy following a premature birth.

Barbree died in Florida, aged 87, on May 14, 2021.

== Bibliography ==
- Barbree, Jay (2014). Neil Armstrong. New York: St. Martin's Press. ISBN 978-1-250-04071-8.
- Barbree, Jay (2007). Live from Cape Canaveral: Covering the Space Race, from Sputnik to Today. London: Collins/Smithsonian Books. pp. 336pp. ISBN 978-0-06-123392-0.
- Barbree, Jay (1997). Destination Mars. New York: Penguin Studio. ISBN 0-670-86020-4.
- Barbree, Jay; Caidin, Martin (1995). A Journey through Time: Exploring the Universe with the Hubble Space Telescope. New York: Penguin Studio. ISBN 0-670-86018-2.
- Shepard, Alan; Slayton, Deke; Barbree, Jay (1994). Moon Shot: The Inside Story of America's Race to the Moon. Atlanta: Turner Pub. ISBN 1-878685-54-6.
- Barbree, Jay (1990). The Day I Died. New Horizon. ISBN 0-88282-061-3.
- Barbree, Jay (1977). The Hydra Pit. Ashley Books. pp. 316pp. ISBN 0-87949-084-5.
- Barbree, Jay (1975). Six Million Dollar Man, No. 4 : Pilot Error. Warner Books, Incorporated. ISBN 0-446-76835-9.
