= High Crystal =

1974 novel by Martin Caidin

- First edition
- Author: Martin Caidin
- Language: English
- Series: Cyborg a.k.a. The Six Million Dollar Man
- Genre: Science fiction novel
- Publisher: Arbor House
- Publication date: 1974
- Publication place: United States
- Media type: Print (Hardback & Paperback)
- Preceded by: Operation Nuke
- Followed by: Cyborg IV

High Crystal is a science fiction/secret agent novel by Martin Caidin that was first published in 1974. It was the second sequel to Caidin's 1972 work Cyborg, which in turn was the basis for the television series The Six Million Dollar Man. Although published after the start of the television series, the book does not share continuity with it.

== Plot summary ==
Steve Austin, an operative for the US government who is part man, part machine, is sent to Peru to investigate a mysterious power source in the ruins of an ancient civilization, but Austin and his team soon discover that a criminal organization also has their sights set on obtaining the power contained within the "High Crystal".
