= Operation Nuke =

1973 novel by Martin Caidin

- First edition
- Author: Martin Caidin
- Language: English
- Series: Cyborg a.k.a. The Six Million Dollar Man
- Genre: Science fiction novel
- Publisher: Arbor House
- Publication date: 1973
- Publication place: United States
- Media type: Print (hardback and paperback)
- Preceded by: Cyborg
- Followed by: High Crystal

Operation Nuke is the title of the second book in the Cyborg series of science fiction/secret agent novels by Martin Caidin which was first published in 1973, just prior to Cyborg being adapted as the television series The Six Million Dollar Man. The first paperback edition of the novel was published as a tie-in with the series.

== Plot summary ==
Steve Austin, an astronaut-turned-cyborg working for a secret branch of American intelligence, is set in pursuit of a criminal syndicate using nuclear blackmail to hold the world to ransom.
