= The Six Million Dollar Man =

American sci-fi action-adventure television series (1973–1978)

- Genre: Science fiction; Action
- Based on: Cyborg by Martin Caidin
- Starring: Lee Majors; Richard Anderson; Martin E. Brooks
- Composers: Jerry Fielding; Stu Philips; Mike Post; Mark Snow; Gil Mellé; Oliver Nelson; Benny Golson; J. J. Johnson
- Country of origin: United States
- Original language: English
- No. of seasons: 5
- No. of episodes: 99 + 6 TV movies (list of episodes)

Production
- Executive producer: Harve Bennett
- Producer: Kenneth Johnson
- Running time: 50–51 minutes
- Production companies: Harve Bennett Productions; Silverton Productions; Universal Television

Original release
- Network: ABC
- Release: March 7, 1973 – March 6, 1978

Related
- The Bionic Woman; The Return of the Six Million Dollar Man and the Bionic Woman; Bionic Showdown: The Six Million Dollar Man and the Bionic Woman; Bionic Ever After? Bionic Woman (2007)

The Six Million Dollar Man is an American science fiction and action television series, running on ABC from March 7, 1973, to March 6, 1978, about a former astronaut, USAF Colonel Steve Austin, portrayed by Lee Majors. After being seriously injured in a NASA test flight crash, Austin is rebuilt (at considerable expense, hence the title of the series) with bionic implants that give him superhuman strength, speed and vision. Austin is then employed as a secret agent by a fictional U.S. government office titled OSI. (Note: OSI was variously referred to as the Office of Scientific Intelligence, the Office of Scientific Investigation or the Office of Strategic Intelligence.) The series was based on Martin Caidin's 1972 novel Cyborg, which was the working title of the series during pre-production.

Following three television films intended as pilots, which all aired in 1973, The Six Million Dollar Man television series aired on ABC as a regular episodic series for five seasons from 1974 to 1978. Steve Austin became a pop culture icon of the 1970s. A spin-off television series, The Bionic Woman, featuring the lead female character Jaime Sommers, ran from 1976 to 1978. During this time, several crossover episodes were produced. Three television movies featuring both bionic characters were also produced from 1987 to 1994.

== Plot ==
=== Original series ===
When NASA astronaut USAF Colonel Steve Austin is severely injured in the crash of an experimental lifting body aircraft, he is "rebuilt" in an operation that costs $6 million (equivalent to $44 million in 2026). His right arm, both legs and left eye are replaced with "bionic" implants that enhance his strength, speed and vision far above human norms: he can run at speeds of over 60 mph (97 km/h), and his eye has a 20:1 zoom lens and infrared capabilities, while his bionic limbs all have the equivalent power of a bulldozer. He uses his enhanced abilities to work for the OSI (Office of Scientific Intelligence) as a secret agent.

=== Television movie reunions ===
Steve Austin and Jaime Sommers returned in three subsequent made-for-television movies: The Return of the Six Million Dollar Man and the Bionic Woman (1987), Bionic Showdown: The Six Million Dollar Man and the Bionic Woman (1989) which featured Sandra Bullock in an early role as a new bionic woman; and Bionic Ever After? (1994) in which Austin and Sommers finally marry. Majors reprised the role of Steve Austin in all three productions, which also featured Richard Anderson and Martin E. Brooks, and Lindsay Wagner reprising the role of Jaime Sommers. The reunion films addressed the partial amnesia Sommers had suffered during the original series, and all three featured Majors's son, Lee Majors II, as OSI agent Jim Castillian. The first two movies were written in the anticipation of creating new bionic characters in their own series, but nothing further was seen of the new characters introduced in those produced. The third TV movie was intended as a finale.

== Cast ==
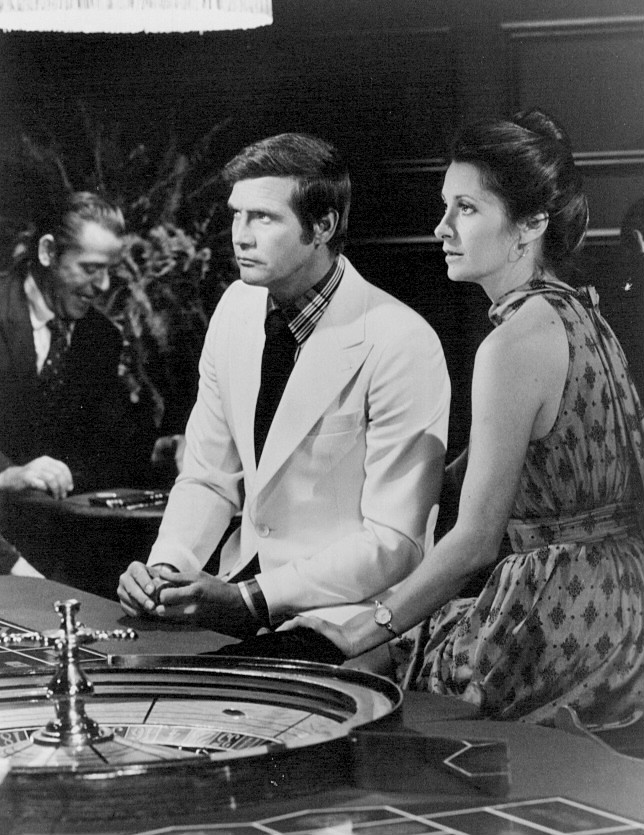
Majors and Elizabeth Ashley

- Steve Austin (played by Lee Majors), the lead character
- Oscar Goldman (played by Richard Anderson), Director of the OSI
- Rudy Wells (played by Martin Balsam, 1st pilot episode; Alan Oppenheimer, 2nd and 3rd pilot episodes, seasons 1 & 2 and 1 episode in season 3; Martin E. Brooks, seasons 3–5, as well as on The Bionic Woman and in three movies), Austin's physician and primary overseer of the medical aspects of bionic technology
- Jaime Sommers (played by Lindsay Wagner—recurring)
- Peggy Callahan (played by Jennifer Darling—recurring), secretary to Oscar Goldman
- Oliver Spencer (played by Darren McGavin), director of the OSO in the pilot

== Production ==
Caidin's novel Cyborg was a best-seller when it was published in 1972. He followed it up with three sequels, Operation Nuke, High Crystal, and Cyborg IV, respectively about a black market in nuclear weapons, a Chariots of the Gods? scenario, and fusing Austin's bionic hardware to a spaceplane.

In March 1973, Cyborg was loosely adapted as a made-for-TV movie titled The Six Million Dollar Man starring Majors as Austin. The producers' first choice was Monte Markham. (When re-edited for the later series, it was re-titled "The Moon and the Desert, Parts I and II".) The adaptation was done by writer Howard Rodman, working under the pseudonym of Henri Simoun. The film, which was nominated for a Hugo Award, modified Caidin's plot and notably made Austin a civilian astronaut rather than a colonel in the United States Air Force. Absent were some of the standard features of the later series: the electronic sound effects, the slow-motion running, and the character of Oscar Goldman. Instead, another character named Oliver Spencer, played by Darren McGavin, was Austin's supervisor, of an organization here called the Office of Strategic Operations, or "OSO". (In the novels, "OSO" stood for Office of Special Operations. The CIA did have an Office of Scientific Intelligence in the 1970s.) The lead scientist involved in implanting Austin's bionic hardware, Rudy Wells, was played in the pilot by Martin Balsam, then on an occasional basis in the series by Alan Oppenheimer, and, finally, as a series regular, by Martin E. Brooks. Austin did not use the enhanced capabilities of his bionic eye during the first TV movie.

The first movie was a major ratings success and was followed by two more made-for-TV movies in October and November 1973 as part of ABC's rotating Movie of the Week series. The first was titled The Six Million Dollar Man: "Wine, Women and War", and the second was titled The Six Million Dollar Man: "The Solid Gold Kidnapping". The first of these two bore strong resemblances to Caidin's second Cyborg novel, Operation Nuke; the second, however, was an original story. This was followed in January 1974 by the debut of The Six Million Dollar Man as a weekly hour-long series. The latter two movies, produced by Glen A. Larson, notably introduced a James Bond flavor to the series and reinstated Austin's status from the novels as an Air Force colonel; the hour-long series, produced by Harve Bennett, dispensed with the James Bond–gloss of the movies, and portrayed a more down-to-earth Austin. (Majors said of Austin, "[He] hates...the whole idea of spying. He finds it repugnant, degrading. If he's a James Bond, he's the most reluctant one we've ever had.") Use of deadly force by Austin–frequent in Caidin's novels and employed occasionally in the movies and early episodes—also decreased as the series progressed.

The show was very popular during its run and introduced several pop culture elements of the 1970s, such as the show's opening catchphrase ("We can rebuild him; we have the technology", voiced over by Richard Anderson in his role of Oscar Goldman), the slow motion action sequences, and the accompanying "electronic" sound effects. The slow motion action sequences were originally referred to as "Kung Fu slow motion" in popular culture (due to its use in that 1970s martial arts television series), although according to The Bionic Book by Herbie J. Pilato, the use of slow motion on the series was inspired by its use by NFL Films.

In 1975, a two-part episode titled "The Bionic Woman", written for television by Kenneth Johnson, introduced the lead character Jaime Sommers (played by Lindsay Wagner), a professional tennis player who rekindled an old romance with Austin, only to experience a parachuting accident that resulted in her being given bionic parts similar to Austin. Ultimately, her body "rejected" her bionic hardware and she died. The character was very popular, however, and the following season it was revealed that she had survived, having been saved by an experimental cryogenic procedure, and she was given her own spin-off series, The Bionic Woman. This spin-off ran until 1978 when both it and The Six Million Dollar Man were simultaneously cancelled, though the two series were on different networks when their final seasons aired.

=== Opening sequence ===
The images of the accident during the opening credits are real, taken from an M2-F2 crash that occurred on May 10, 1967. Test pilot Bruce Peterson's lifting body aircraft hit the ground at approximately 260 mph (418 km/h) and tumbled six times, but Peterson survived what appeared to be a fatal accident, though he later lost an eye to infection. (Note: Video of the craft in flight, and oscillating as in the intro, can be seen at the NASA Dryden Flight Research Center site. The NASA web site, however, does not offer the video of the crash itself, only still photos of the wrecked M2-F2.) In the episode "The Deadly Replay", Oscar Goldman refers to the lifting body aircraft in which Austin crashed as the HL-10, stating, "We've rebuilt the HL-10." The HL-10 is the aircraft first seen in the original pilot movie before the accident flight. In the 1987 TV film The Return of the Six Million Dollar Man and the Bionic Woman, Austin refers to the craft as the "M3-F5", which was the name used for the aircraft that crashed in the original Cyborg novel.

In the opening sequence, a narrator (series producer Harve Bennett) identifies the protagonist, "Steve Austin, astronaut. A man barely alive." Richard Anderson, in character as Oscar Goldman, then intones off-camera, "Gentlemen, we can rebuild him. We have the technology. We have the capability to make the world's first bionic man. Steve Austin will be that man. Better than he was before. Better . . . stronger . . . faster." During the first season, beginning with "Population: Zero", Anderson, as Goldman, intoned more simply, "We can rebuild him. We have the technology. We can make him better than he was. Better . . . stronger . . . faster." During the operation, as his bionics are being fitted, a list of items and numbers is displayed and lists his power plant as "atomic".

=== Theme music ===
The opening and closing credits of the Wine, Women & War and The Solid Gold Kidnapping telefilms used a theme song written by Glen A. Larson, and sung by Dusty Springfield, backed by Ron "Escalade" Piscina. This song was also used in the initial promotion of the series.

However, when the weekly series began, the song was replaced by an instrumental theme by Oliver Nelson. The first regular episode, "Population: Zero", introduced a new element to the opening sequence: a voiceover by Oscar Goldman stating the rationale behind creating a bionic man. The first season narration and opening credits arrangement of Nelson's theme were shorter than that used in the second and subsequent seasons.

=== Steve Austin's bionics ===
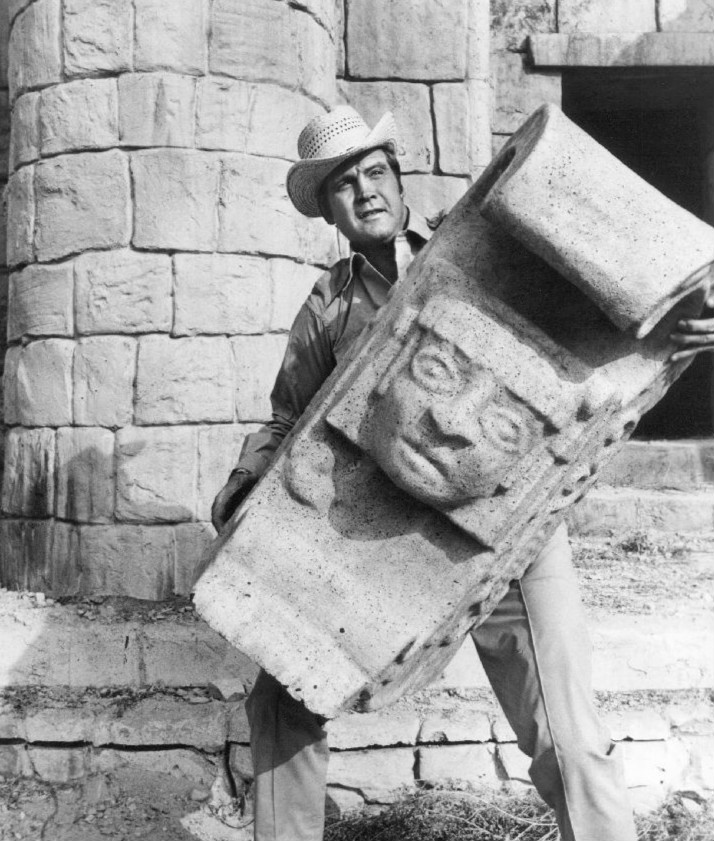
A demonstration of Austin's superhuman strength

To maintain the show's plausibility, producer Kenneth Johnson set very specific limits on Steve Austin's abilities. He elaborated, "When you're dealing with the area of fantasy, if you say, 'Well, they're bionic so they can do whatever they want,' then it gets out of hand, so you've got to have really, really tight rules. [Steve and Jaime] can jump up two stories but not three. They can jump down three stories but not four."

Austin's superhuman enhancements are:

- A bionic left eye:

It has a 20.2:1 zoom lens along with a night vision function (as well as the restoration of normal vision). The figure of 20.2:1 is taken from the faux computer graphics in the opening credits, and the rounded figure "20:1" is mentioned twice in the series, specifically in episodes "Population: Zero" and "Secret of Bigfoot". Austin's bionic eye also has other features, such as an infrared filter used frequently to see in the dark and also to detect heat (as in the episode "The Pioneers"), and the ability to view humanoid beings moving too fast for a normal eye to see (as in the story arc "The Secret of Bigfoot"). One early episode shows the eye as a deadly accurate targeting device for his throwing arm.
In Caidin's original novels, Austin's eye was depicted as simply a camera (which had to be physically removed after use) and Austin remained blind in the eye. Later, Austin gained the ability to shoot a laser from the eye. The Charlton Comics comic book spin-off from the series also established that Austin's bionic eye could shoot a laser beam (as demonstrated in the first issues of the color comic), but neither function was shown on television.

- Bionic legs:

These allow him to run at tremendous speed and make great leaps. Austin's upper speed limit was never firmly established, although a speed of 60 mph (97 km/h) is commonly quoted since this figure is shown on a speed gauge during the opening credits. The highest speed ever shown in the series on a speed gauge is 67 mph (108 km/h) in "The Pal-Mir Escort"; however, the later revival films suggested that he could run approximately 90 mph (145 km/h). A faster top speed is possible, as an episode of the Bionic Woman spin-off entitled "Winning Is Everything" shows female cyborg Jaime Sommers outrunning a race car going 100 mph (161 km/h). In "Secret of Bigfoot" it is stated that he can leap 30 feet (9.1 m) high. In the later TV movies, Austin is shown leaping heights that clearly appear to be far in excess of this.

- A bionic right arm:

It has the equivalent strength of a bulldozer; that the arm contains a Geiger counter was established in "Doomsday and Counting", the sixth episode of the first season.

The implants have a major flaw in that extreme cold interferes with their functions and can disable them given sufficient exposure. However, when Austin returns to a warmer temperature, the implants quickly regain full functionality. The first season also established that Austin's bionics malfunction when exposed to cosmic radiation while in space, rectified by an addition of another layer in the artificial skin for shielding. The bionic eye is vulnerable to ultrasonic attack, resulting in blindness and dizziness. It is not explained how Austin's organic body is able to withstand the stress of either bionic hardware weight or performance of superhuman feats.

To indicate to viewers that Austin was using his bionic enhancements, sequences with him performing superhuman tasks were presented in slow-motion and accompanied by an electronic "dit dit dit dit" sound effect. (This characteristic sound effect was actually first used in season 1 episode 4, "Day of the Robot", not during use of Austin's bionics but with the robotic clone of Major Fred Sloan, played by actor John Saxon, during the final fight scene.) When the bionic eye was used, the camera zoomed in on Austin's face, followed by an extreme close-up of his eye; his point of view usually included a crosshair motif accompanied by a beeping sound-effect. In early episodes, different ways of presenting Austin's powers were tested, including a heartbeat sound effect that predated the electronic sound, and in the three original made-for-TV movies, no sound effects or slow-motion were used, with Austin's actions shown at normal speed (except for his running, which used trick photography); the slow-motion portrayal was introduced with the first hour-long episode, "Population: Zero".

== Episodes ==
Season	Episodes	Originally released	
Season	Episodes	First released	Last released
Pilot movies		March 7, 1973	November 17, 1973
1	13	January 18, 1974	April 26, 1974
2	22	September 13, 1974	April 27, 1975
3	21	September 14, 1975	March 7, 1976
4	22	September 19, 1976	May 15, 1977
5	21	September 11, 1977	March 6, 1978
Television movies	3	May 17, 1987	November 29, 1994

== Novels ==
Martin Caidin wrote four novels featuring his original version of Steve Austin beginning in 1972 with Cyborg. Although several other writers such as Mike Jahn later wrote a number of novelizations based upon the TV series, in most cases these writers chose to base their character upon the literary version of Austin rather than the TV show version. As a result, several of the novelizations have entire scenes and in one case an ending that differed from the original episodes, as the cold-blooded killer of Caidin's novels handled things somewhat differently from his non-killing TV counterpart. For example, the Jahn book International Incidents, an adaptation of the episode "Love Song for Tanya", ends with Austin using the poison dart gun in his bionic hand to kill an enemy agent; since the TV version of the character lacked this weapon, the villain was simply captured in the episode as broadcast.

=== Original novels ===
(all by Martin Caidin)

- Cyborg (1972)
- Operation Nuke (1973)
- High Crystal (1974)
- Cyborg IV (1975)

(Of the above, only Cyborg was adapted for television.)

=== Novelizations ===
- Wine, Women and War – Mike Jahn
- Solid Gold Kidnapping – Evan Richards
- Pilot Error – Jay Barbree
- The Rescue of Athena One – Jahn (two similarly themed episodes combined into one storyline)
- The Secret of Bigfoot Pass (UK title, The Secret of Bigfoot) – Jahn
- International Incidents – Jahn (this volume adapted several episodes into one interconnected storyline)

== Other adaptations ==
=== Animation ===
Steve Austin was a former astronaut who was assumed dead when his test ship broke up. He was secretly recovered by the government and rebuilt using $6 million worth of bionic parts, making him stronger, better, faster than he was. The catch was that he had to pay it all back, which takes a very long time on a government salary.

While on a camping sabbatical in the episode Home Insecurity, Brock Samson crossed into a restricted area and ran into the two, with Steve on the defensive over suspicions that Brock was sent by the OSI to bring him back. Following a short confrontation Brock recognized Steve, reassuring him that he was friendly and helping them escape the area by shaving Sasquatch and ripping Steve's bionic arm off to make them look like Vietnam veterans. Steve and Sasquatch decided to go up to Canada where Sasquatch has family.

Following his resignation from the OSI, Brock Samson visits Steve Summers and Sasquatch and stays with them while he recovers from surgery. At the end of his stay Sasquatch gives Brock a balaclava he knitted for him as a gift. In exchange Brock gives Steve and Sasquatch a portrait he painted of the two of them as art therapy, which Steve compliments as "beautiful".[1]

=== Comics ===
Charlton Comics published both a color comic book and a black and white, illustrated magazine, featuring original adventures as well as differing adaptations of the original TV movie. While the comic book was closely based upon the series, and geared toward a young audience, the magazine was darker and more violent and seemed to be based more upon the literary version of the character, aimed at adult readers. Both magazines were cancelled around the same time the TV series ended. Artists Howard Chaykin and Neal Adams were frequent contributors to both publications. Steve Kahn, who had previously published magazines on the Beatles and the teen fan magazine FLiP, worked with MCA and Charlton in overseeing and publishing these books.

A British comic strip version was also produced, written by Angus P. Allan, drawn by Martin Asbury and printed in TV comic Look-In (around the time both TV series ended in 1978, it and Look-In's Bionic Woman strip merged into one title called Bionic Action). A series of standalone comic strips was printed on the packaging of a series of model kits by Fundimensions based upon the series. In Colombia, a black and white comic book series was published in the late 70s, with art and stories by Jorge Peña. This series was licensed by Universal studios to Greco (Grupo Editorial Colombiano), then known as Editora Cinco, now part of Grupo Editorial Televisa. In France, Télé-Junior, a magazine devoted to comic book adaptations of all sorts of TV series and cartoons also featured a Six Million Dollar Man comic (under its French title, L'Homme qui valait trois milliards, i.e. The Three Billion Dollar Man) with art by Pierre Le Goff and stories by P. Tabet and Bodis. A tradepaperback reprinting several episodes from the magazine was released in October, 1980.

In 1996, a new comic book series entitled Bionix was announced, to be published by Maximum Press. The comic was to have been an updated version of both the Six Million Dollar Man and the Bionic Woman and feature new renditions of the two characters. Although the magazine was advertised in comic book trade publications, it was ultimately never published.

On August 24, 2011, Dynamite Comics published the first issue of The Bionic Man, an adaptation written by Kevin Smith based upon a screenplay he'd written for a never-produced 1990s motion picture version of The Six Million Dollar Man. After concluding the adaptation in the spring of 2012 the comic series moved on to original stories, as well as a re-imagining of the original TV series' Secret of Bigfoot storyline. A spin-off comic re-imagining The Bionic Woman followed a few months later, and in January 2013 Dynamite launched a crossover mini-series, The Bionic Man vs. The Bionic Woman. The artwork in these series, covers and interiors, varies between Austin being rendered in the likeness of Lee Majors and not. As 2014 began, Dynamite discontinued its reboot titles and replaced them with a new ongoing series, The Six Million Dollar Man Season 6, continuing the adventures of Austin from the conclusion of the 1977–78 season and featuring not only the likeness of Lee Majors, but also other recurring actors such as Richard Anderson, as well as Darren McGavin as Oliver Spencer from the first TV movie. Jaime Sommers was reintroduced from issue 3, with a spin-off comic series, The Bionic Woman Season 4, announced in June 2014 with a scheduled launch in the fall of 2014. Dynamite has since published crossover titles pairing Jaime with characters from Charlie's Angels and the Lynda Carter version of DC Comics' Wonder Woman, and a crossover featuring Steve encountering characters from G.I. Joe.

=== Audiobooks ===
Peter Pan Records and its sister company Power Records published several record albums featuring original dramatized stories (including an adaptation of the pilot film), several of which were also adapted as comic books designed to be read along with the recording. Three albums' worth of stories were released, one of which featured Christmas-themed stories. Individual stories were also released in other formats, including 7 in (18 cm) singles.

=== Film ===
Universal Pictures developed a screenplay in 1995 with Kevin Smith, but the outing never materialized. In December 2001, it was announced that Universal had pacted with Dimension Films on the project after Dimension president Bob Weinstein saw its potential as a franchise. Universal retained film rights to the original TV show, while Dimension purchased the rights to the Cyborg novel, as well as Caidin's three other novels in the series: Operation Nuke, High Crystal and Cyborg IV. Larry Gordon and Scott Faye were going to produce with Paul Rosenberg's Collision Entertainment. Smith's screenplay was later adapted for The Bionic Man, an ongoing comic book series launched in 2011 by Dynamite Comics.

In October 2002, Trevor Sands was hired to write a new screenplay, titled The Six Billion Dollar Man, but Dimension scrapped it when actor Jim Carrey pitched a comedic take on the material for him to star in, with Scot Armstrong as writer and Todd Phillips as director/co-writer. Filming was expected to begin in 2004.

In a July 2006 interview at San Diego Comic-Con, Richard Anderson (who played Oscar Goldman in the series) stated that he was involved with producing a movie of the series, but the rights were at the time in litigation between Miramax and Universal.

On November 6, 2014, it was announced that a feature film starring Mark Wahlberg as Austin was entering pre-production at Dimension. Tentatively titled The Six Billion Dollar Man, Peter Berg was set to direct for a theatrical release in 2016. On November 2, 2015, it was reported that Berg had left the film and had been replaced by Damian Szifron, who would also write the film; accompanying this announcement was a December 22, 2017 release date. However, by 2017 the movie had yet to enter production—that December, The Weinstein Company sold the film's rights to Warner Bros. Pictures. Warner initially hoped to start filming the movie in mid-2018, setting a May 31, 2019 release date for the film; however, mere months before filming was to begin, Szifron was pulled from the project. During the search for a director, The Six Billion Dollar Man was pushed back to June 5, 2020 before being removed from Warner Bros.' release schedule altogether later that year. Travis Knight was hired as the new director, alongside Bill Dubuque as writer, in April 2019, though the film has yet to return to the studio's release schedule. As of 2023, Wahlberg still expressed "hope" that the project will happen.

== Cultural influence ==
In Brazil, under the military dictatorship, some important government officials, previously elected by direct suffrage, were appointed by the president, or elected indirectly, out of a shortlist picked by the president. These politicians were called "bionic" (biônicos), due to the series' popularity, and the association with the perceived extraordinary power and influence held by the appointed officials. Between 1964 and 1985, Brazil came to have "bionic" senators, governors and mayors. With the 1988 Constitution of Brazil, all "bionic" appointments were abolished.

In Israel, the series was retitled The Man Worth Millions since "six million" evoked memories of The Holocaust; specifically the most commonly quoted estimate of the number of Jewish victims.

In 1977 the British sketch comedy series The Benny Hill Show spoof both The Six Million Dolar Man and The Bionic Woman with the sketch "The Bionic Baby" that told the story of the Bionic Baby (later the Bionic Boy), the son of Steve Austin and Jaimie Sommers.

In Indonesia, the comedy group Warkop released a 1981 parody comedy film of the series Manusia 6.000.000 Dollar, with the title being simply a direct translation.

== Award ==
In 2003, Lee Majors won TV Land's "Superest Superhero" award.

== Home media ==
Universal Playback released the first two seasons of The Six Million Dollar Man on DVD in Region 2 and Region 4 in 2005–2006. The first three seasons were also released on the Italian market (Region 2) in late 2008. The season 1 release also features the three pilot movies that preceded the weekly series.

The Region 1 (North American) release, along with that of The Bionic Woman was one of the most eagerly awaited; its release had been withheld for many years due to copyright issues regarding the original novel. In fact, with the exception of a few episodes released in the DiscoVision format in the early 1980s and a single VHS release of the two-part The Bionic Woman storyline that same decade, the series as a whole had never been released in North America in any home video format.

On July 21, 2010, Time Life (under license from Universal Pictures) announced the release of a complete series box set of The Six Million Dollar Man on DVD in Region 1 on November 23, 2010. The 40-disc set features all 99 episodes of the series as well as the three pilot films and the three reunion TV-movies which also feature Jaime Sommers, along with several episodes of The Bionic Woman that were part of inter-series crossovers (i.e. part one aired on one series, and part two on another) in order to include complete storylines. In addition, the set features extensive bonus features including interviews and featurettes with all major cast members and the set comes encased in collectible packaging that includes a sound chip, activated when the box is opened, that plays back part of the first season opening credits dialogue. The release is available directly through Time-Life's "6mdm" website as well a through several third-party on-line vendors.

In November 2011, Universal Pictures Home Entertainment began releasing individual season sets of the series on DVD, available in retail stores. It has subsequently released all five seasons. The fifth and final season was released on February 18, 2014.

Several episodes of The Six Million Dollar Man actually saw their North American DVD debut several weeks in advance of the box set, as Universal Home Video included the three "crossover" episodes that helped launch The Bionic Woman as bonuses on the October 19, 2010 DVD release of Season 1 of The Bionic Woman.

On October 13, 2015, Universal Home Video released a retail version of The Six Million Dollar Man - The Complete Series on DVD in Region 1.

In Region 2, Fabulous Films acquired the rights to the series in 2012 and subsequently released seasons 3–5 on DVD on October 1, 2012. It also re-released the first two seasons on February 25, 2013. A 40-disc complete series boxset was released on April 2, 2012.

On May 2, 2022, Shout Factory announced the complete series is scheduled to be released on Blu-ray July 12, 2022. It will also feature crossover episodes and six films.

DVD Name	Ep #	Release dates		
DVD Name	Ep #	Region 1	Region 2	Region 4
The Complete Season One	16	November 29, 2011	September 26, 2005; February 23, 2013 (Re-release)	August 15, 2006
The Complete Season Two	22	October 2, 2012	October 23, 2006; February 23, 2013 (Re-release)	October 24, 2006
The Complete Season Three	22	February 19, 2013	October 1, 2012	N/A
The Complete Season Four	23	October 8, 2013	October 1, 2012	N/A
The Complete Season Five	21	February 18, 2014	October 1, 2012	N/A
The Complete Series	99	November 23, 2010; October 13, 2015 (Re-release)	April 2, 2012	TBA
