= Steve Austin (character) =

Fictional character

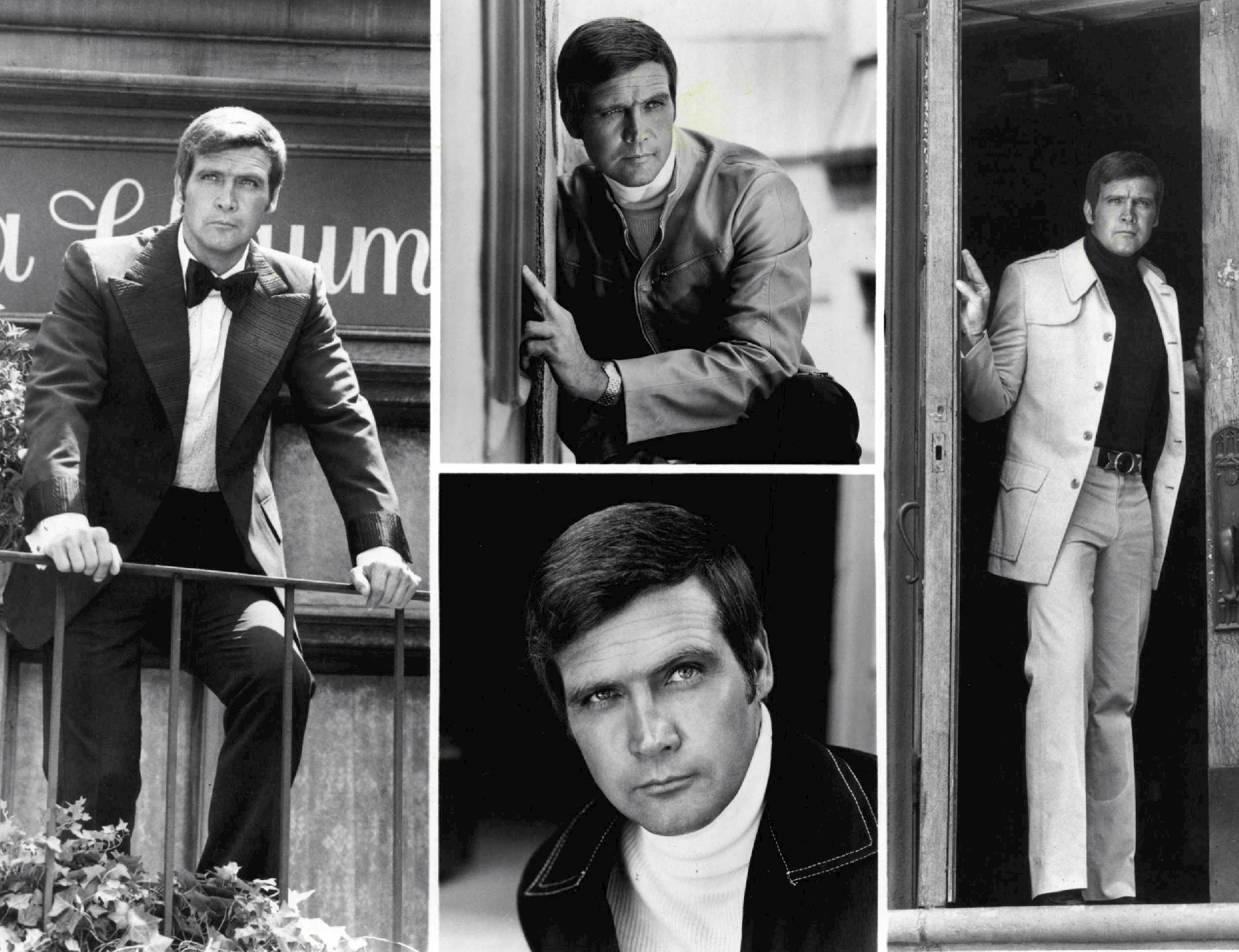
- First appearance: Cyborg (1972 novel)
- Last appearance: Bionic Ever After? (1994 TV movie)
- Created by: Martin Caidin
- Portrayed by: Lee Majors

In-universe information
- Aliases: The Six Million Dollar Man, The Bionic Man
- Species: Human, Cyborg
- Gender: Male
- Occupation: Secret agent, former astronaut and test pilot, former soldier/ USAF (novels)
- Spouse: Jaime Sommers (The Bionic Woman)
- Children: Michael Austin
- Nationality: American

Steve Austin is a science fiction character created by Martin Caidin for his 1972 novel, Cyborg. The lead character, Colonel Steve Austin, became an iconic 1970s television science fiction action hero, portrayed by actor Lee Majors, in the American television series The Six Million Dollar Man, which aired on the ABC network for multiple television pilots in 1973, and then as a regular series for five seasons from 1974 to 1978. In the television series, Steve Austin takes on special high-risk government missions using his superhuman bionic powers. The television character Steve Austin became a pop culture icon of the 1970s.

The Six Million Dollar Man TV series used the name Cyborg as its working title, during pre-production.

Caidin's version of Steve Austin appeared in only four original novels unrelated to the television series continuity: Cyborg, Operation Nuke, High Crystal, and Cyborg IV.

Following The Six Million Dollar Man television series, Lee Majors reprised the role of Colonel Steve Austin in several bionic-themed reunion television films in the late 1980s and 1990s.

== Background ==
As originally conceived by Caidin, Austin is a former US Army helicopter pilot who served in Vietnam before transferring to the Air Force and then into NASA. As backup Lunar Module Pilot for Apollo 17, he became one of twelve astronauts to walk on the Moon when the primary lunar module pilot broke an arm before launch.

In the pilot episode of The Six Million Dollar Man, Austin's background is adjusted: he is a civilian test pilot who was the only civilian to walk on the moon. In the regular series, however, Austin once again became a military man, holding the rank of colonel in the Air Force. In the episode "Pilot Error", Austin is shown to be wearing both the Vietnam Service Medal and the Vietnam Campaign Medal on his dress uniform, implying that he is a Vietnam veteran. His other medals include the Distinguished Flying Cross (United States), the Air Medal, and the National Defense Service Medal. He is also seen in uniform wearing Air Force Outstanding Unit Award. Further, he is seen wearing either the USAF Command Pilot "Wings" or the USAF Command Pilot Astronaut "Wings", more specifically named the U.S. Air Force aeronautical rating.

In both versions of his origin, Austin is testing an experimental lifting body aircraft when a malfunction causes a crash. Austin's injuries are severe: both legs and one arm are lost, and he is also blinded in one eye and his skull is fractured (the TV version does not suffer the skull injury). One of Austin's best friends is Dr. Rudy Wells, a doctor and scientist who is a specialist in the newly emerging field of bionics; unknown to Wells, a secret American government intelligence agency, the Office of Strategic Operations (OSO; later changed to Office of Scientific Intelligence or OSI for TV) has been looking at a way of reducing agent casualties. Their solution is to take a severely injured man, rebuild him with bionics, and create a cyborg—part man, part machine. Wells is ordered to perform the procedure on Austin, who expresses a desire to commit suicide after learning about the loss of his limbs.

== As cyborg ==
The operation to rebuild him costs $6 million ($41.6 million in 2024 dollars). Bionics are used to replace Austin's arm (his left in Caidin's original story; his right in the TV version) and both legs. Austin's eye is also replaced. Caidin and the TV series treat this differently; Caidin's Austin receives a sophisticated miniature camera (activated by pressing a hidden shutter implanted under Austin's skin, after which the eye has to be removed before development of the film) but otherwise remains blinded in that eye, while the television version not only restores sight but also has extreme telescopic magnification and infrared capabilities. His legs and arm provide Austin with superhuman speed, strength, and endurance (the latter because, Caidin writes, Austin's heart and lungs only need to power his torso, head and remaining arm). Caidin's character also had some additional bionic parts his TV counterpart lacked, such as a steel-reinforced skull, a poison dart gun built into one of his bionic fingers, and a radio transmitter built into a rib.

Another big distinction between Caidin's original and his television counterpart is the extent to which the bionics could supply strength and speed. In the former, Austin's strength and speed were limited by the physical abilities of the connecting human parts. For instance, Austin could run faster than the best Olympic athlete, whereas the TV character could run 60 MPH. Caidin himself satirized the TV series' unrealistic science in another novel, ManFac.

Both versions of the character are subsequently recruited into the OSO/OSI as a secret agent (and as an ongoing test subject for bionics). Austin becomes a top agent, traveling the world to fight everything from terrorism (the most common target of the literary version of the character) to even alien invasion on television. As a military officer he remains an active member of the NASA Astronaut Corps, but the media describes his command of the Athena Rescue mission (necessary because his bionic strength is needed) as a surprise. Austin is obscure enough to usually maintain his anonymity, and uses his astronaut status to establish credibility when necessary.

Austin's personality was altered in the TV series. In the books, Austin was capable of being cold-blooded and did not hesitate to use his powers to kill if necessary. Yet in the TV pilot, Austin is initially hesitant to work for the OSI because, he says, "I don't want to kill people," although he appears to do just that in the subsequent mission. After the show's first season, however, Austin was usually not shown killing anyone.

In Caidin's novels, Austin's superior is OSO chief Oscar Goldman. Goldman was replaced by another character, Oliver Spencer, in the TV pilot film, but appeared in the regular series. The relationship between the TV version of Austin and Oscar was much friendlier than the literary counterpart, although numerous episodes show Austin being frustrated at being a "bionic lap dog" for the OSI.

== Backstory ==
Austin's backstory is barely described by Caidin. The TV series, however, introduced his mother and stepfather (of Ojai, California, which has a billboard informing visitors of its famous astronaut native), and eventually, a fiancée, Jaime Sommers, who later became bionic after a skydiving accident, leading to a spin-off series, The Bionic Woman. Lee Majors made frequent guest appearances on the spin-off series, which springboarded from Jaime being brought back to life after her bionics failed; a consequence of this was she lost all memory of her relationship to Austin. Both The Six Million Dollar Man and The Bionic Woman went off the air in 1978.

A later episode reveals that Austin's biological father was also an Air Force pilot and was killed in the crash of his C-47 Skytrain in the China-Burma-India Theater during World War II.

Further details about Austin's later life were filled in during three made-for-TV reunion movies that aired between 1987 and 1994. In the first (The Return of the Six Million Dollar Man and the Bionic Woman), which takes place several years after Austin retires from the OSI, it is revealed that he had a son, Michael, born in the mid-1960s. His mother is not identified. Michael would serve in the U.S. Air Force as a pilot. Michael suffers traumatic injuries in a crash similar to that which his father experienced, and undergoes bionic rebuilding which renders him more powerful than his bionic father. In exchange for Michael's operation, Austin agrees to return to OSI and his son also becomes an operative, though he did not appear in any subsequent films. In the second film, Bionic Showdown: The Six Million Dollar Man and the Bionic Woman, Austin is shown to be a senior OSI operative helping thwart a terrorist attack against an athletic event in Canada. Bionic Ever After?, the final reunion film, saw Austin's bionics malfunctioning due to a computer virus, but in the end he is rescued by Jaime and the two finally marry as the film ends. Unlike Jaime, who undergoes an upgrade to her bionics in Bionic Ever After? which apparently adds new abilities, no such upgrade was ever evidenced for Austin in the telefilms, with the exception of an apparent enhancement to his bionic eye which is illustrated in Bionic Ever After?.

== Notes ==
1. While the subsequent Six Million Dollar Man TV series also identified Austin's mission as Apollo 17, there were also contradictory names given at other times. In the 1973 pilot telefilm, Wine, Women and War, Austin's flight is identified in dialogue as Apollo 19. Later, when the original Six Million Dollar Man telefilm (based upon the Cyborg novel) was reedited for syndication as a two-part episode entitled "The Moon and the Desert", a prologue was added that identified Austin's flight by the name. "The Rescue of Athena One" says that Austin's Skylab Rescue mission will be his first trip to space since walking on the Moon in January 1972, a date between Apollo 15 and Apollo 16.
2. In real life, Harrison Schmitt, the prime LMP, did not need to be replaced by the backup LMP, Charles Duke, who had already walked on the Moon as part of the Apollo 16 crew.
3. The name of the lifting body varies. In the Cyborg novel (and sequel books) and the later telefilm Return of the Six Million Dollar Man and the Bionic Woman, the aircraft is identified as the M3-F5. In the Six Million Dollar Man episode, "The Deadly Replay", it is identified as the real-life Northrop HL-10. The actual footage used in the original telefilm (and subsequently in the opening credits of the series) was of both an HL-10 and the crash of an M2-F2. At no point in the original telefilm or later series was Austin's aircraft ever identified in dialogue as the M2-F2.
