= The Bionic Woman =

American sci-fi action-adventure television series (1976–1978)

- Genre: Science fiction Action-adventure; Drama; Superhero
- Created by: Kenneth Johnson
- Based on: Cyborg by Martin Caidin
- Starring: Lindsay Wagner; Richard Anderson; Martin E. Brooks
- Theme music composer: Jerry Fielding
- Country of origin: United States
- Original language: English
- No. of seasons: 3
- No. of episodes: 58 (list of episodes)

Production
- Camera setup: Single-camera
- Running time: 49 minutes
- Production company: Universal Television

Original release
- Network: ABC
- Release: January 14, 1976 – May 4, 1977
- Network: NBC
- Release: September 10, 1977 – May 13, 1978

Related
- The Six Million Dollar Man; Bionic Woman (2007)

The Bionic Woman is an American science fiction action-adventure television series created by Kenneth Johnson based on the 1972 novel Cyborg by Martin Caidin and starring Lindsay Wagner, that aired on ABC from January 14, 1976, to May 4, 1977, and later on NBC from September 10, 1977, to May 13, 1978. A spin-off from the 1970s Six Million Dollar Man television science fiction action series, The Bionic Woman is centered on the fictional Jaime Sommers, who takes on special high-risk government missions using her superhuman bionic powers.

Wagner starred as professional tennis player Jaime Sommers, who becomes critically injured during a skydiving accident. Jaime's life is saved by Oscar Goldman (Richard Anderson) and Dr. Rudy Wells (Alan Oppenheimer, Martin E. Brooks) with bionic surgical implants similar to those of The Six Million Dollar Man Steve Austin (Lee Majors). Through the use of cybernetic implants, known as bionics, Jaime is fitted with an amplified bionic right ear which allows her to hear at low volumes, at various frequencies, and over uncommonly long distances. She also has extraordinary strength in her bionic right arm and in both legs that enables her to jump great distances and run at speeds exceeding 60 miles per hour. She is then assigned to secret missions as an occasional agent of the Office of Scientific Intelligence, while teaching middle and high school students in her regular life.

The series proved highly popular worldwide, gaining solid ratings in the United States and particularly in the United Kingdom (where it became the only science fiction program to achieve the No. 1 position in the ratings during the 20th century). The series ran for three seasons, from 1976 to 1978, first on the ABC network and then the NBC network for its final season. Years after its cancellation, three spin-off television movies were produced between 1987 and 1994. Reruns of the show aired on Sci-Fi Channel from 1993 to 2001. A short-lived remake of the series was produced in 2007.

== Plot ==
The character of Jaime Sommers first appears in a 1975 two-part episode of The Six Million Dollar Man titled "The Bionic Woman". In the first episode, Steve travels to his hometown of Ojai, California, to buy a ranch that is for sale and to visit his mother and stepfather, Helen and Jim Elgin. During his visit, he rekindles his relationship with high school sweetheart Jaime Sommers, now one of America's top 5 tennis players.

While she is on a skydiving date, Jaime's parachute malfunctions and she plummets to the ground, falling through tree branches, hitting the ground and suffering traumatic injuries to her head, legs, and right arm. Steve makes an emotional plea to his boss, Oscar Goldman, to save Jaime's life by making her bionic. When Oscar balks, Steve commits Jaime to becoming an operative of the Office of Scientific Intelligence (OSI). Goldman ultimately gives in and assigns Dr. Rudy Wells (played at this point in the series by Alan Oppenheimer) and the bionics team to rebuild her.

Jaime's body is reconstructed with parts similar to Steve's, but later Oscar jokes that hers cost less than Austin's six million dollars because her parts were "smaller" (despite the show's German name, Die Sieben Millionen Dollar Frau, or The Seven Million Dollar Woman). Like Austin, her right arm and both her legs are bionic, but instead of a bionic eye she has a bionic ear. Jaime's legs are capable of propelling her at speeds exceeding 60 miles per hour (having been clocked at more than 62 mph in "Doomsday Is Tomorrow" and outpacing a race car going 100 mph in "Winning Is Everything") and jumping to and from great heights. Her right arm is capable of bending steel or throwing objects great distances. Her right ear gives her amplified hearing such that she can detect most sounds regardless of volume or frequency. These bionic implants cannot be distinguished from natural body parts, except on occasions where they sustain damage and the mechanisms beneath the skin become exposed, as seen in Part 2 of the episode "Doomsday Is Tomorrow", when Jaime sustains damage to her right leg. Jaime discovers on vacation in the Bahamas that her artificial bionic skin cannot suntan with exposure to sunlight.

After Jaime recovers from her operation, Steve tries to break his agreement with Oscar that she will serve as an agent for OSI. Jaime agrees to undertake a mission for Oscar despite Steve's concerns. During the mission her bionics malfunction, and she experiences severe and crippling headaches. Dr. Wells determines that Jaime's body is rejecting her bionic implants and a massive cerebral clot is causing her headaches and malfunctions. Soon after, Jaime goes berserk and forces her way out of the hospital. Steve pursues and catches her, and she collapses in his arms. Soon after, Jaime dies on the operating table when her body shuts down.

The character was so popular that ABC asked the writers to find a way to bring her back. In the first episode of the next season, it is revealed that Jaime had not died after all, but Steve was not told. He soon discovers the truth when he is hospitalized after suffering severe damage to his bionic legs; he sees Jaime before slipping into a coma.

As Steve later learns, Wells' assistant, Dr. Michael Marchetti, urged Rudy (now played by Martin E. Brooks) to try his newly developed cryogenic techniques to keep Jaime in suspended animation until the cerebral clot could be safely removed, after which she was successfully revived. A side effect of the procedure causes Jaime to develop retrograde amnesia, preventing her from recalling previous events including her relationship with Steve. Any attempt to remember causes her headaches and pain. Realizing that he is the primary trigger for her painful memories, Steve reluctantly asks Oscar to transfer Jaime to another medical facility away from him. There, she undergoes a successful surgery to restore her memory—she remembers everything except her love for Steve and the skydiving accident that led to her bionics. When they meet again, she tells Steve that they can start again with friendship and that it can be a whole new beginning for them. Steve agrees.

Jaime retires as a tennis player and takes a job as a schoolteacher at an Air Force base in Ojai, California. She lives in an apartment over a barn located on the ranch owned by Steve's mother and stepfather, both of whom are aware of Steve and Jaime's bionic implants and their lives as secret agents. Season three opened with the two-part episode "The Bionic Dog", in which Jaime discovers Max, a German Shepherd that has been given a bionic jaw and legs and can run at speeds up to 90 mph. His bionics pre-date Steve's and Jamie's, as he was a lab animal used to test early bionic prosthetics. He was named "Maximillion" because his bionics cost "a million" dollars. When he was introduced, he experienced symptoms suggesting bionic rejection and was due to be put to sleep. Jaime discovered the condition was psychological, stemming from a traumatic lab fire that injured him when he was a puppy. With Jaime's help, Max was cured and went to live with her, proving himself to be of considerable help in some of her adventures. The original intent was to create a spin-off series featuring "the bionic dog", and at the end of the two-part episode that introduced him, it was implied Max would stay with Jaime's forest ranger friend Roger Grette in the Sierra Mountains and Jaime would visit occasionally. However, the network rejected the proposed spin-off series and Max stayed with Jaime instead, making several appearances throughout the third season of The Bionic Woman.

== Production and broadcast ==
To maintain the show's plausibility, creator/executive producer Kenneth Johnson set very specific limits on Jaime Sommers' abilities. He elaborated, "When you're dealing with the area of fantasy, if you say, 'Well, they're bionic so they can do whatever they want,' then it gets out of hand, so you've got to have really, really tight rules. [Steve and Jaime] can jump up two stories but not three. They can jump down three stories but not four. Jaime can't turn over a truck but she can turn over a car." These limits were occasionally incorporated into episodes, such as "Kill Oscar", in which Jaime is forced to make a jump that's too far down for her bionic legs, causing massive damage to them and nearly causing her death as a result.

The series premiered on ABC in January 1976, as a mid-season replacement for the sitcoms When Things Were Rotten and That's My Mama. With fourteen episodes airing from January 1976 to May 1976, it became the fifth-most-watched television show of the 1975–76 season—despite running for only half the season—ranking behind Maude, Laverne & Shirley, Rich Man, Poor Man, and All In The Family, and slightly ahead of The Six Million Dollar Man. Season two ran from September 1976 to May 1977 with 22 episodes and finished with good ratings (number 14 overall, slightly behind The Six Million Dollar Man). Season two also had its most notable episodes, "Kill Oscar", in which Jaime fights the fembots, and "Deadly Ringer", for which Wagner won an Emmy Award. Although the show performed well during season two, ABC elected not to renew the series, feeling it was no longer attracting the kind of demographic that ABC wanted (ABC head Fred Silverman was notorious for his focus on demographics). NBC picked up the show for a third (and final) season, which ran from September 1977 to May 1978 with 22 episodes and featured a new character, Chris Williams (Christopher Stone), as a recurring love interest for Jaime. This was due in part to the change of networks, which prevented further crossovers by Jaime's former love interest, Steve Austin; however, in a situation still considered unique, Anderson and Brooks continued to play their roles in both series, despite the network differential. A new bionic dog named Max was added for the show's third season.

The series proved popular worldwide, particularly in the United Kingdom, where it was shown on the ITV network and achieved unusually high audience figures for a science fiction show. The first episode of the series ("Welcome Home Jaime") was shown on 1 July 1976 and was the most watched programme of the week. It was watched in 7 million homes, giving it an average of 14 million viewers. Two weeks later, the show's third episode (Angel of Mercy) also became the most watched programme of the week. Its success continued with a further 10 episodes scoring in the top 20 during 1976. (By contrast, The Six Million Dollar Man never once entered the top 10 rating during its five seasons, though this was most likely because the show was never broadcast across all ITV stations at the same time.) The second season also proved popular, with seven episodes finishing in the weekly top 20, the highest of these being the episode The Vega Influence on 12 May 1977, which reached No. 8 with 14.8 million viewers. The third season was not broadcast simultaneously across all ITV stations in the UK, however, and therefore no episodes reached the weekly Top 20.

== Episodes ==
=== Storylines ===
The most notable of the frequent crossovers between the two shows included a two-part episode in which Steve and Jaime square off against Austin's sometimes-friend/sometimes-enemy Bigfoot and a three-part story arc entitled "Kill Oscar" that aired the first and third parts as Bionic Woman episodes and the second part as an episode of The Six Million Dollar Man. The close connection between The Six Million Dollar Man and The Bionic Woman was highlighted by the fact that Richard Anderson and Martin E. Brooks played their same characters on two television shows (eventually) running concurrently on two networks.

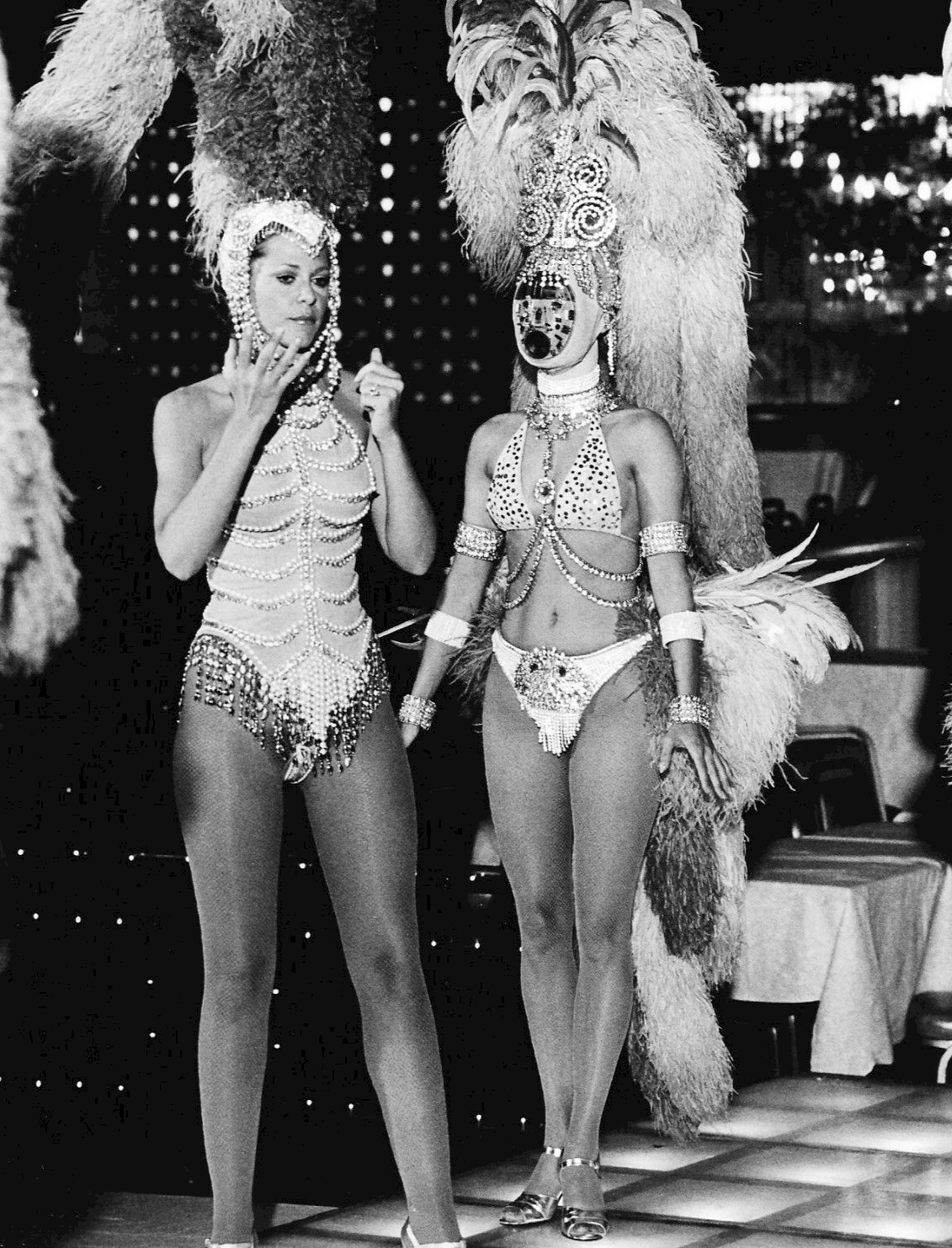
Jaime poses as a Las Vegas showgirl to gather information on the Fembot army of an evil scientist.

On her own, Jaime's enemies include the Fembots, a line of powerful robots that she fights twice in the series over several episodes. She also thwarts the plan of an aging nuclear scientist named Elijah Cooper to destroy all life on Earth using a doomsday device in "Doomsday Is Tomorrow". Jaime's missions frequently involved undercover work in which she takes on a secret identity, such as a nun, a police officer, a college student, an air-steward, a singer, and a professional wrestler. Her tennis background also came into play occasionally, and she was also from time to time seen having adventures with some of her students in Ojai.

As with spy shows at this time, Jaime was frequently kidnapped (more often than not with the use of chloroform or a drugged drink) and placed in dangerous situations from which she would need her bionic abilities to escape. Typically, she would be bound or handcuffed to a bomb from which she could escape with ease once she woke up. However, on one occasion she was handcuffed to a friend, so she could not use her bionic strength to escape as this would pull off the friend's hand.

Jaime dealt with a number of bizarre cases, such as a villain who operates a hair salon using a "truth serum" shampoo to extract information from OSI agents. In another episode, a convict named Lisa Galloway (also portrayed by Lindsay Wagner) is given plastic surgery and tries to replace Jaime. In a later episode, Lisa ingests a paste-like substance called Adrenalizine that gives her temporary super-strength, allowing her to fully replace Jaime at OSI while the real Jaime is imprisoned and led to question her own identity. Lisa, however, did not know of Jaime's bionic implants and believed her powers to have come from the Adrenalizine. After Jaime's eventual escape, Dr. Wells discovers that the Adrenalizine was breaking down and becoming toxic to Lisa's health. Further complicating the issue was Lisa's increasing belief that she was in fact, the real Jaime.

During the series, it is shown that Jaime's enhanced abilities have their limitations. In one of the "Kill Oscar" chapters, Jaime jumps from the window of a particularly tall building while trying to escape the Fembots. However, due to the height from which she jumped, her legs explode upon landing, nearly killing her. Extreme cold is shown to inhibit her bionic implants, causing them to freeze up and malfunction (a scenario also common with Steve Austin). However, her right ear, as it is encased in her body, is typically not subject to these negative effects.

While Steve Austin occasionally (particularly in early episodes) employed violence in order to complete missions, Jaime's approach tended to be less-violent and as such she was rarely shown directly using her bionic strength against a human opponent (and even when she did, never with deadly force).

=== Final episode ===
In the last episode ("On the Run"), Jaime is called "Robot Lady" by a little girl who has learned about her bionics. Like Steve Austin in the original book Cyborg, she has to come to terms with the fact that she is not quite human. After three years with too many assignments to allow her time to herself, she resigns. However, the people in charge decide that she cannot just be allowed to leave and want to put her into a safe community where they can keep their eye on her. She goes on the run but later realises that she is still the same woman, despite her mechanical parts and goes back to work for the OSI, but with fewer missions and more time to herself. The final episode was inspired by The Prisoner as Jaime is similarly being pursued by entities concerned about the secret information she possesses.

Despite being on different networks, both The Bionic Woman and The Six Million Dollar Man were simultaneously cancelled in the spring of 1978 due to poor ratings; after 2 1/2 and 5 seasons respectively. Unlike The Six Million Dollar Man, which ended with a standard episode, "On the Run" was written and filmed as a resolution to the series.

=== TV movies ===
Three made-for-TV movies were produced that expanded the "bionic family" and explored a rekindled love between Jaime and Steve.

In the first reunion, The Return of the Six Million Dollar Man and the Bionic Woman (1987), Jaime and Steve are reunited after nearly ten years of living separate lives. Jaime's memory is fully restored (according to Oscar, Jaime was involved in an explosion at the American Embassy in Budapest and "she remembered everything" after she recovered from her concussion) and she tries to reconcile her feelings for Steve while at the same time helping train Steve's son Michael in the use of his own recently acquired updated bionics. Jaime challenges Michael to a friendly race. He overtakes her and she makes the comment that she feels like an "obsolete model". Michael is kidnapped by Fortress. Steve and Jaime along with the Air Force infiltrate the abandoned glass factory to "rescue" Michael.

The second film, Bionic Showdown: The Six Million Dollar Man and the Bionic Woman (1989), introduced Sandra Bullock as paraplegic Kate Mason who becomes a next-generation bionic woman and Sommers again helps train the neophyte cyborg.

In the final reunion film, Bionic Ever After? (1994), a computer virus corrupts Jaime's bionic systems. Dr. Wells informs Steve that "she may never be bionic again", but Steve's main regard is he wants her alive above all else. She undergoes a major upgrade, which not only increases the power of her bionics but gives her night vision. Finally, after many years, the bionic couple get married.

== Music ==
Jerry Fielding was the regular composer for the series and wrote its opening and closing themes. His friend Joe Harnell took over regular music duties midway through season one and wrote new opening and closing themes for season two. When Fielding expressed disappointment at this, the show instituted a policy where they used Fielding's opening theme and Harnell's closing theme. Harnell's compositions for the program were post-released from 2002-2010 in the compact disc format. In 1978, Columbia released a 45 rpm record with Japanese singers performing (in Japanese) "Jaime's Love" and "At The Time of Kindness".

Lindsay Wagner performed Morris Albert's song "Feelings" on the 1976 episode "Bionic Beauty". She also recorded Joe Harnell's song "Time Changes" for the 1977 episode "Deadly Ringer".

== Home media ==
In the UK, Universal released three single-disc volumes of selected episodes of The Bionic Woman in 2001/02. Each volume contained three episodes. Universal then released the first two full seasons of The Bionic Woman on DVD in the UK and Australia in 2005/06. There were no special features on any of the sets. Season three was eventually released in the UK by Fabulous Films in December 2012, along with repackaged versions of the first two seasons and a complete 18-disc boxed set of all three seasons. These versions contained various special features as found on the Region 1 sets (see below), though the season three release also contains all three of the Bionic reunion movies from the 1980s and 1990s.

In Germany, Koch Media has released all three seasons on DVD under the name Die Sieben Millionen Dollar Frau (The Seven Million Dollar Woman), though these sets do not contain special features.

Plans for a North American DVD release were first announced in 2004 by Universal Home Video. Those plans were made public via a listing in a TV-DVD release guide sent to retailers, a mention in an otherwise unrelated studio press release, and as a trailer included on a DVD given away through retail chain Best Buy. However, that release never happened due to rights issues which prevented both The Bionic Woman and The Six Million Dollar Man from being released on DVD in North America at that time.

In April 2010, creator Kenneth Johnson said that the rights issues had been solved and he was taping interviews for the DVD. On July 15, 2010, Universal Studios announced the release of the first season on DVD in North America, which took place on October 19, 2010. Season Two was released on May 17, 2011. On October 4, 2011, Universal released The Bionic Woman: The Complete Third & Final Season on Region 1 DVD.

On October 13, 2015, Universal released The Bionic Woman – The Complete Series on DVD in Region 1.

Shout! Factory released the complete series on Blu-ray on August 30, 2022.

DVD Name	Ep #	Release dates				Extras
DVD Name	Ep #	Region 1	Region 2 (UK)	Region 2 (DE)	Region 4	Extras
The Complete Season One	14	October 19, 2010	Universal: September 26, 2005; Fabulous Films: February 25, 2013	March 7, 2008	August 15, 2006	*Five Six Million Dollar Man crossover episodes, including the first four appearances of Jaime Sommers. *Bionic Beginnings featurette *Gag reel *Audio commentaries and photo gallery
The Complete Season Two	22	May 17, 2011	Universal: October 23, 2006; Fabulous Films: February 25, 2013	July 25, 2008	October 24, 2006	*Two Six Million Dollar Man crossover episodes *Bionic Blast featurette *Lindsay Wagner and Kenneth Johnson audio commentaries *Photo gallery
The Complete Season Three	22	October 4, 2011	Fabulous Films: December 3, 2012	January 30, 2009	TBA	* Lindsay Wagner Q&A; *Podcast; *Audio commentaries and photo gallery *All three reunion movies (Region 2 only)
The Complete Series	58	October 13, 2015	December 10, 2012	N/A	N/A	

== In other media ==
Two novels adapting various episodes were published to coincide with the series: Welcome Home, Jaime and Extracurricular Activities, both by Eileen Lottman. The UK editions of these two books were credited to "Maud Willis" and were retitled Double Identity and A Question of Life, respectively. Although the closing credits of every episode says the series was based upon Martin Caidin's 1972 novel, Cyborg, this only refers to the bionics concept, the characters of Rudy Wells and Oscar Goldman, and the occasional appearance by Steve Austin; Jaime Sommers does not appear in any of Caidin's novels.

Charlton Comics published a comic book adaptation, beginning in late summer 1977 (October shelf date). The series would not pick up again until #2's February 1978 shelf date, then continued until June of that year, for at total of five issues. UK comic Look-In ran a colour comic strip between 1976 and 1979, written by Angus P. Allan and drawn by artists including John Bolton and Arthur Ranson. The character was also to have appeared in a 1996 comic miniseries entitled Bionix by Maximum Press. Although the magazine was advertised in comic book trade publications, it was ultimately never published.

In 1977 the British sketch comedy series The Benny Hill Show spoof both The Bionic Woman and The Six Million Dolar Man with the sketch "The Bionic Baby" that told the story of the Bionic Baby (later the Bionic Boy), the son of Jaimie Sommers and Steve Austin.

The French comic magazine Télé-Junior published strips based on the TV series. This included their own versions of The Six Million Dollar Man and the Bionic Woman which was renamed Super Jaimie. The artist behind this was Pierre Dupuis.

In March 2012, Dynamite Entertainment launched a new The Bionic Woman comic book title, based upon the revised continuity established in the Kevin Smith-written The Bionic Man comic (a reimagining of The Six Million Dollar Man), in which the character of Jaime Sommers was reintroduced. A crossover mini-series, The Bionic Man vs. The Bionic Woman, was launched in January 2013. Unlike the Bionic Man title, which (depending on the artist) occasionally renders Steve Austin in the likeness of actor Lee Majors, the Dynamite version of Jaime Sommers generally is not rendered in the likeness of Lindsay Wagner. In late 2013, Dynamite ended both series and in the spring of 2014 launched The Six Million Dollar Man Season 6, a more faithful adaptation of the original Six Million Dollar Man TV series. Jaime Sommers, based on the Wagner interpretation, was reintroduced in issue 3 and in June 2014 Dynamite announced it will publish The Bionic Woman Season 4, a continuation of the TV series, beginning in the fall of 2014.

== Merchandise ==
The Bionic Woman board game

Like its parent program The Bionic Woman spawned its own line of toys. Kenner produced a 12-inch doll of the character, with similar features to the Steve Austin version (bionic modules and removable bionic limbs), except instead of a bionic eye the doll's head would click when turned, simulating the sound of Jaime's bionic ear. Accessories for the doll released by Kenner included additional fashions, and a Bionic Beauty Salon playset.

A metal lunchbox for children was available, as was a vinyl story record produced by Wonderland Records. Kenner produced a series of stickers and temporary tattoos featuring Jaime Sommers individually and with Steve Austin.

A board game based on The Bionic Woman series was also created. It was sold by Parker Brothers in the US, and was a 2–4 player game suited for children between 7 and 12 years of age.

In July 2016, prior to Comic-Con International, The New York Times ran a story about Dynamite Entertainment. In it, best-selling author Andy Mangels was revealed to be writing a prestigious new intercompany crossover mini-series for the company, in conjunction with DC Comics: Wonder Woman '77 Meets The Bionic Woman, bringing together the Lynda Carter television character with Lindsay Wagner's fellow 1970s television super-heroine. The series was released in December 2016. A crossover comic book series with Charlie's Angels titled, Charlie's Angels vs. the Bionic Woman was released in July 2019.

== Television remake ==
In August 2002 it was announced that the show was to be remade by producers Jennifer and Suzanne Todd ("Team Todd") for the USA Network. After the initial press release was issued, the show never made it out of pre-production and no other announcements were made as to the show's fate.

On October 9, 2006, NBC Universal announced that it was bringing the project back, with new producers and a reworking of the concept. The project's one-hour pilot was given an official greenlight by NBC on January 3, 2007. English actress Michelle Ryan (affecting an American accent) was cast in the title role for this pilot, and Katee Sackhoff played Sarah Corvus, the bionic woman's nemesis. The series was subsequently picked up by NBC and debuted on September 26, 2007. Eight more episodes were produced and aired before the Writers Guild of America strike forced a halt to production. Series developer and producer David Eick told the official website of the Sci-Fi Channel (now known as Syfy) on March 18, 2008, that the series had been cancelled.

The new series was much darker than the original and received mixed reviews. Lindsay Wagner, the original Bionic Woman, was not involved in the new series and was very critical of this version. Wagner said, "On a technical level, it was very good, but I don't think they understood the show. It was steeped in that old-school thinking. It was like a lot of things today, angry and dark."

== See also ==
- Goldengirl, a 1979 novel and 1979 TV movie also about a woman with superhuman abilities.
