= Martin Caidin =

American author (1927–1997)

- Born: September 14, 1927; New York City, U.S.
- Died: March 24, 1997 (aged 69); Tallahassee, Florida, U.S.
- Occupations: Author, screenwriter
- Spouse: Dee Dee Caidin
- Writing career
- Genres: Military history, science fiction

Martin Caidin (September 14, 1927 – March 24, 1997) was an American author, screenwriter, and an authority on aeronautics and aviation.

Caidin began writing fiction in 1957. In his career he authored more than 50 fiction and nonfiction books as well as more than 1,000 magazine articles. His best-known novel is Cyborg, which was the basis for The Six Million Dollar Man franchise. He also wrote numerous works of military history, especially concerning aviation.

Caidin was also an airplane pilot. He bought and restored a 1936 Junkers Ju 52 airplane.

== Fiction ==
Caidin's fiction incorporated future technological advances that were projected to occur, and examined the political and social repercussions of these innovations. In this respect, his work is similar to that of Michael Crichton. One recurring theme is that of cyborgs, meldings of man and machine, using replacement body parts known as bionics. Caidin references bionics in his novel The God Machine (1968) and in his most famous novel, Cyborg (1972). Cyborg was adapted somewhat loosely as the 1973 television movie The Six Million Dollar Man, the precursor of a television series of the same name. Caidin wrote three sequels to Cyborg: Operation Nuke, High Crystal, and Cyborg IV. These novels constitute a different continuity from that of The Six Million Dollar Man. (Novelizations of several of the television episodes were written by other authors; these tend to imitate more closely Caidin's original version of the Steve Austin character than the less violent television series does.)

Caidin was credited in episodes of the original Bionic Woman series, a Six Million Dollar Man spinoff, but not in the 2007 remake of The Bionic Woman.

Years later, Caidin would reference bionics in a satirical manner in his novel Buck Rogers: A Life in the Future, an adaptation of the pulp fiction and comic strip character Buck Rogers in which Rogers is given bionic parts after being revived from his centuries-long coma.

Caidin's 1964 novel Marooned, about American astronauts who become stranded in space and NASA's subsequent attempt to rescue them, is based on Project Mercury. The book was adapted into a 1969 movie of the same name starring Gregory Peck, Richard Crenna, David Janssen, James Franciscus and Gene Hackman, with Caidin making a brief appearance as a reporter describing the arrival of the rescue vehicle at Cape Canaveral. The movie was based on Project Apollo and Caidin revised his novel in 1969, as a movie novelization, to reflect the change.

World War Two books written by Caidin include Samurai!; Black Thursday; Thunderbolt!; Fork-Tailed Devil: The P-38; Flying Forts; Zero!; The Ragged, Rugged Warriors; A Torch to the Enemy; and The Last Dogfight. Caidin's books about space travel include No Man's World, in which the Soviets beat the Americans to the moon, and Four Came Back, about an ill-fated space station for eight crew members. Caidin's other books with movie tie-ins include The Final Countdown and novels featuring adventurer-archaeologist Indiana Jones. He also wrote the book Exit Earth, which was a Noah's Ark in space story; he said it was one of his favorite books and he always felt it would be an amazing motion picture.

== Aeronautics ==
Caidin bought and restored to full airworthiness the oldest surviving Junkers Ju 52 aircraft, a Ju 52/3m, Serial No. 5489, which he named Iron Annie. Caidin was pilot-in-command of Iron Annie on November 14, 1981, when 19 people walked on one of its wings, a world record. He was one of a small number of pilots to have successfully taken off a Junkers Ju 52 in less than 400 feet (120 meters). After touring extensively among shows of vintage military aircraft, or warbirds, Iron Annie was sold to Lufthansa during 1984. The airline renamed it Tempelhof. After the accident of another Ju 52, Lufthansa retired its aircraft which has been put on display at Frankfurt Airport in 2026. Caidin chronicled the warbird restoration movement generally in Ragwings and Heavy Iron, and the restoration and further adventures of Iron Annie specifically in The Saga of Iron Annie. His novel Jericho 52 also incorporates many of his experiences with Iron Annie.

During 1961, Caidin was one of the pilots of a formation flight of B-17s across the Atlantic Ocean, likely the last such flight, from the United States to England via Canada, the Azores, and Portugal. During the voyage, the pilots had a near-miss with a submarine. Caidin recounted this journey in his book Everything But The Flak.

Caidin also worked as a pilot for the movie The War Lover, flew with the U.S. Air Force Thunderbirds demonstration squadron for several months, and was made an honorary member of the U.S. Army's Golden Knights parachute demonstration team.

Additionally, Caidin wrote an aircraft manual for the Messerschmitt Bf 108, which has been approved by the Federal Aviation Administration as the standard manual for the plane, and twice won the Aviation/Space Writers Association award for the outstanding author on aviation.

Caidin also established a company with the purpose of promoting aeronautics to young people.

== Talk show host ==
During the mid-1980s, Caidin hosted Face to Face, a confrontational television talk show in which he challenged representatives of many prominent American far-right organizations and hate groups. The one-hour broadcasts were co-written and produced by Bob Judson, and taped at the Nautilus Television Studios outside of Orlando, Florida. Among those whom Caidin confronted on Face to Face were Rabbi Meir Kahane, head of the Jewish Defense League (who would be assassinated a year later in a New York hotel lobby), Matt Koehl, successor to George Lincoln Rockwell as head of the American Nazi Party, Dick Butler of Aryan Nations, journalist Charlie Reese, and John McMann of the John Birch Society. Caidin was a friend of 1960s talk show host Joe Pyne, and used the same confrontational interview style, combined with research.

Caidin also taught a progressive journalism course at the University of Florida in Gainesville, titled Caidin's Law.

== Claims of psychic ability ==
Caidin, known as a stickler for technical detail, incorporated supernatural elements in his Bermuda Triangle novel Three Corners To Nowhere (1975). During the mid-1980s, Caidin began claiming to have the power of telekinesis, specifically, to be able to move one or more small devices called energy wheels or psi wheels. Parapsychologist Loyd Auerbach, a friend of Caidin's who sometimes appeared with him in demonstrations and workshops, reiterated a strong endorsement of him in his June 2004 Fate magazine column.

The magician James Randi offered to test Caidin's claimed abilities during 1994. During September 2004, Randi wrote: "He frantically avoided accepting my challenge by refusing even the simplest of proposed control protocols, but he never tired of running on about how I would not test him."

== Personal life ==
Caidin was married four times. He had two daughters with his first wife, Grace. His fourth wife was Dee Dee Caidin who acted as his agent, contacting publishers for his work through her business, The Wordsmith Shop. Caidin died of thyroid cancer on March 25, 1997, at the age of 69.
