= Michael Jahn =

American journalist, author and memoirist

Joseph Michael Jahn (born August 4, 1943) is an American journalist, author and memoirist.

He was born in Cincinnati, Ohio, and raised in Sayville, New York. He moved to New York City in 1966 and was educated at Dowling College, Adelphi University, and Columbia University. He spent the first decade of his career covering cultural issues, mainly by becoming, in 1968, the first full-time rock journalist of The New York Times and the first full-time rock writer for any major daily newspaper. According to the Times metropolitan editor Arthur Gelb, he hired Jahn specifically to inaugurate the newspaper's coverage of rock music. One of his first assignments was to cover the Woodstock Festival.

Jahn wrote more than 200 reviews of performances by rock bands and individual folk and blues artists for the New York Times between 1968 and 1971. He also wrote a column syndicated by North American Newspaper Alliance, 1967–1970, and The New York Times, 1970–1973. Jahn wrote several works of nonfiction before the mid-1970s, when he switched to writing mystery/suspense fiction, eventually publishing about 50 novels and movie/TV adaptations, under his own name and several pen names. His first mystery novel, The Quark Maneuver, published by Ballantine in 1977, won an Edgar Award in 1978.

In 1982 and using the byline Michael Jahn he began the series "The Bill Donovan Mysteries" with Night Rituals. By 2008 he had published 10 novels in the series, the last being Donovan and Son, published by Five Star (Gale Centage) in 2008. "The Bill Donovan Mysteries" were highly acclaimed, and in 2011 he began reformatting them for publication in ebook edition (Kindle). By the end of 2012, six of the 10 had been published in digital format.

With the conclusion of the Donovan series he stopped writing fiction in order to concentrate on a memoir of the last century and a half of American history as reflected in the lives of his recent ancestors. They came from all over Western Europe and had adventures that included being part of the opening of Japan to Western civilization, the great sea battles of the Civil War, arctic exploration, the Roosevelts, the Lindberg baby trial, the Hindenburg Disaster, the American Communist Party, and brushes with Dutch Schultz, Harry Truman, and, in his words, "a passel of currently deceased rock stars."

Jahn's original manuscripts and papers are in the Michael Jahn Collection at the Rare Book & Manuscript Library of Columbia University. The collection was established in 1984.
