= The Bionic Man (comics) =

Publication information
- Publisher: Dynamite Entertainment
- Format: Ongoing series
- Main character(s): The Six Million Dollar Man

Creative team
- Written by: Kevin Smith

Kevin Smith - The Bionic Man Vol. 1: Some Assembly Required is the unused script created by Kevin Smith.

== Reception ==
The comic received a mostly positive reception from critics.
