= Alan Feinstein (actor) =

American actor (b. 1941)

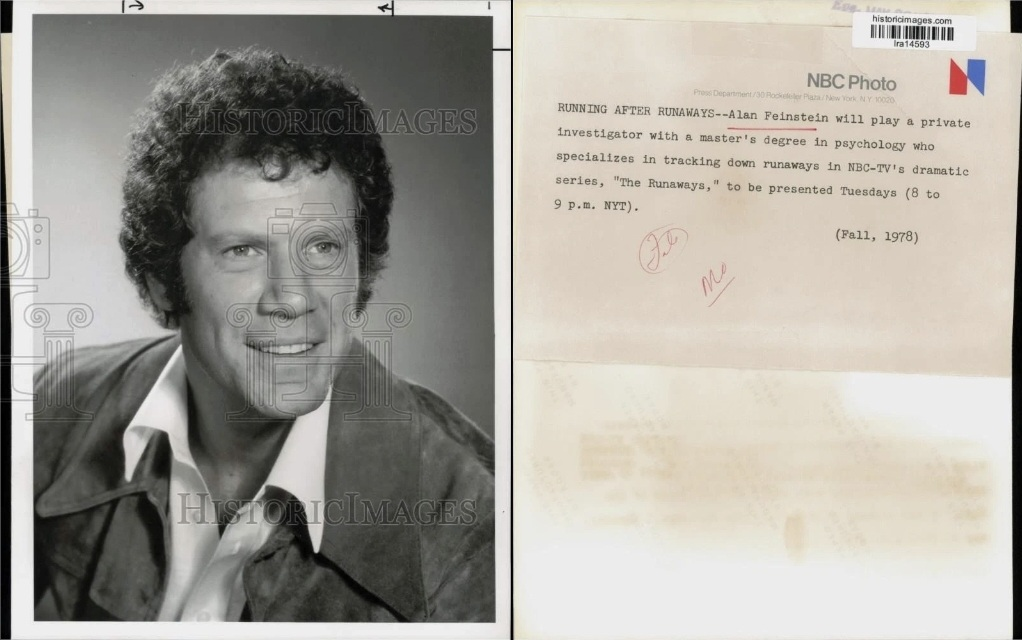
- Feinstein in The Runaways, 1978
- Born: September 8, 1941 (age 85); New York City, U.S.
- Other name: Alan Yorke
- Occupation: Actor
- Years active: 1963–present

Alan Feinstein (born 8 September 1941) is an American actor. Early in his career, he was credited as Alan Yorke in 3 plays.

== Early life and career ==
Feinstein grew up in Queens, New York and started acting as a senior in high school. He is noted for his 1983 award-winning stage performance in A View from the Bridge. From 1978-1979, he starred in the short lived QM Productions TV series The Runaways as Steve Arrizio, a former juvenile officer turned clinical psychologist who rescued runaway children from danger.

In 1979, Feinstein starred with Lindsay Wagner on the made-for-television drama film The Two Worlds of Jennie Logan. His other credits include roles the films Bad Girls Go to Hell (1965, credited as Alan Yorke), Looking for Mr. Goodbar (1977), Knightrider (1982), Merchants of Venus (1998), and the soap operas Falcon Crest and General Hospital.

== Personal life ==
Feinstein dated actress Lana Wood for most of the 1980s.

== Filmography ==
=== Film ===
Film
Year	Title	Role	Notes
1965	The Sex Perils of Paulette	John	Party guest; credited as Alan Yorke
1965	Bad Girls Go to Hell	Ted Kelton	Credited as Alan Yorke
1971	Lady Liberty	Aide	Uncredited
1976	Joe Panther	Rocky	
1977	Looking for Mr. Goodbar	Martin Engle	
1985	War and Love	Franek	
1998	Merchants of Venus	Andre	
2008	Traces	Sydney Kessler	Short film
2010	Renegotiations	Tony Rizoni	Short film
2012	Change to Spare	Steve	Homeless; short film

=== Television ===
Television
Year	Title	Role	Notes
1963	Armstrong Circle Theatre	Jenkins	Credited as Alan Yorke
1965–1968	Love of Life	Mickey Krakauer	
1966	Dark Shadows	Mike	Uncredited
1967	N.Y.P.D.	Congregation Member	Uncredited
1971–1974	The Edge of Night	Dr. Jim Fields	40 episodes
1974	Kojak	Lenny Grenfell	
1975	The Supercops	Bobby Hantz	TV movie
1975	The Rookies	Steve Granger	
1975	Cannon	Mike Marsh	
1975	Baretta	Joey Tonelli	
1975	Harry O	Phil Unsworth	
1975	Bronk	Borrison	
1975	Medical Story	Frank Wharton	
1975	Barnaby Jones	Tony Barrow	
1975	Kate McShane		
1976	Jigsaw John	Sam Donner	15 episodes
1977	Bunco	Sonny	TV movie
1977	The Streets of San Francisco	Roger Callaway	
1977	Alexander: The Other Side of Dawn	Charles Selby	TV movie
1977	The Hunted Lady	Sergeant Stanley Arrizio	TV movie
1977-1978	Charlie's Angels	Baylor / Dave Christopher	2 episodes
1978	The Users	Marty Lesky	TV movie
1978	Visions	Gus Kosko	S3:E3, "Fans of the Kosko Show"
1978	Madman	Stan Gould	
1979	The Runaways	Steve Arizzio	13 episodes
1979	The Two Worlds of Jennie Logan	Michael Logan	TV movie
1979	Trapper John, M.D.	P.K. O'Keefe	
1980	The Love Boat	Tom Barry	
1980–1981	Insight	John / Don	2 episodes
1981	Masada	Aaron	Miniseries
1981	Vega$	Warner Ramsey	
1981	The Righteous Apples	Jake	
1982	Cassie & Co.	Robert Dennis	
1982	Archie Bunker's Place	Professor Wright	
1983	The Fall Guy	Ted Harmon	
1983	St. Elsewhere	Michael Stewart	
1983	Teachers Only	David	
1983	The Family Tree	Dr. David Benjamin	3 episodes
1983	Tucker's Witch	Samuel Pressman	
1983	Hardcastle and McCormick	Peter Avery	
1984	Legmen	Phil Grover	
1984	The Paper Chase	District Attorney Martin	
1984	Knight Rider	Mark Taylor	
1984	Finder of Lost Loves	Nick Hardy	
1984	Call to Glory	Jim Brown	
1984	Jessie	Detective Bill Stone	
1985	Remington Steele	Bradford Murdock	
1985	Otherworld	Virago	
1985	Berrenger's	Max Kaufman	9 episodes
1985	Simon & Simon	Dr. Karl Chadway	
1986	Hotel	Mike Ames	
1986	Second Serve	Bill	TV movie
1987	On Fire	La Roca	TV movie
1987	Knots Landing	Nick	2 episodes
1988	Jake and the Fatman	Steve Matthias	
1988	General Hospital	Gregory Howard	16 episodes
1989	HeartBeat	Dr. George Burke	
1989	Falcon Crest	Malcolm Sinclair	7 episodes
1989	My Boyfriend's Back	Bobby Henry	TV movie
1989	Manhunt: Search for the Night Stalker	Peter Morgan	TV movie
1989–1991	Murder, She Wrote	George Woodward / Mike Freelander	2 episodes
1990	L.A. Law	Judge Henry Sawyer	
1990	Over My Dead Body	Paul Emerson	
1991	Law & Order	Elliot Ketcham	
1991	Santa Barbara	Jim Sanford	15 episodes
1993	Silk Stalkings	Marcus Boland	
1994	Parallel Lives	Dan Merrill	TV movie
1998	Pensacola: Wings of Gold	Matthews	
2001–2002	Crossing Jordan	Blackie Conroy	2 episodes
2002	NYPD Blue	Lt. Shanley	
2005	Nip/Tuck	Mr. Bolton	
2006	Though None Go with Me	Dr. Delgado	TV movie
2023	S.W.A.T.	Todd	
