= Robert Hinkle =

Robert Hinkle may refer to:

- Robert Hinkle (judge) (born 1951), American judge
- Robert Hinkle (stuntman) (1930–2026), American actor, director and stuntman
