= Nan Martin =

American actress (1927–2010)

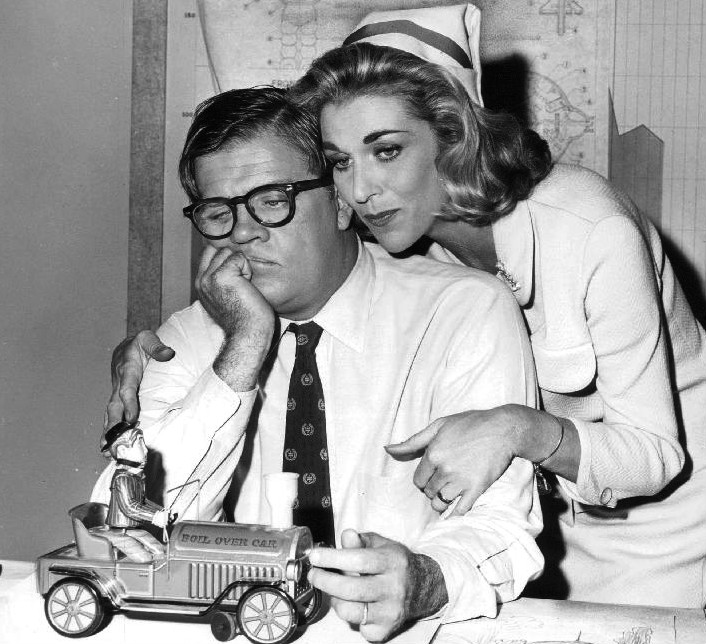
- Martin (right) and Pat Hingle in "The Incredible World of Horace Ford", a 1963 episode of The Twilight Zone
- Born: July 15, 1927; Decatur, Illinois, U.S.
- Died: March 4, 2010 (aged 82); Malibu, California, U.S.
- Occupations: Actress, comedian
- Years active: 1952–2005
- Spouses: Robert Emmett Dolan (m. 1948; div. 1967) Harry Gesner (m. 1970)
- Children: 2, including Zen Gesner

Nan Martin (July 15, 1927 – March 4, 2010) was an American actress and comedian who starred in movies and on television.

== Early life ==
Nan Martin was born on July 15, 1927, in Decatur, Illinois. She was raised in Santa Monica, California, and attended Santa Monica High School.

== Career ==
Martin's first film role was The Man in the Gray Flannel Suit (1956). Her other film roles included The Mugger (1958), For Love of Ivy (1968), Goodbye Columbus (1969), Doctor Detroit (1983), All of Me (1984), and Chuck Russell's cult film A Nightmare on Elm Street 3: Dream Warriors (1987) where she played the role of Amanda Krueger, the mother of killer Freddy Krueger. Her last film role was in Thicker than Water (2005).

On television, Martin portrayed Helen Cavanaugh on Buck James and Grace D'Angelo on Mr. Sunshine. Her other TV roles included the 1983 miniseries The Thorn Birds and the soap opera Santa Barbara. She had a recurring role on The Drew Carey Show as Mrs. Louder. She made many guest appearances on various television series, including Ben Casey, The Untouchables, Mannix, Hart to Hart, The Twilight Zone, two episodes of The Fugitive, The Invaders, the first-season Star Trek: The Next Generation episode "Haven", and in the Columbo television movie, Murder, Smoke and Shadows. In 1965, she played co-murderer Beth Fuller in the Perry Mason episode "The Case of the Fatal Fortune".

She appeared on two episodes of The Golden Girls: first as the mean-spirited and nasty Frieda Claxton, who was told to drop dead by Rose Nylund, after which she did. She also portrayed Philomena, a friend of Sophia Petrillo's from Sicily, who claimed that Dorothy was really her daughter and not Sophia's. One month after her appearance on The Golden Girls, she appeared as Valerie's mean chain-smoking Aunt Josephine on The Hogan Family. She also briefly appeared as a cranky woman in the Curb Your Enthusiasm episode "Porno Gil".

Martin's Broadway credits include The Eccentricities of a Nightingale (1976), Summer Brave (1975), Come Live With Me (1967), Under the Yum-Yum Tree (1960), Henry IV, Part I (1960), Lysistrata (1959), The Great God Brown (1959), J.B. (1958), Makropoulos Secret (1957), The Constant Wife (1951), and A Story for a Sunday Evening (1950).

== Personal life ==
Martin's first husband was musical composer Robert Emmett Dolan, whom she married on March 17, 1948; they had one son, Casey Martin Dolan. Her second husband, Harry Gesner, is the father of her younger son, actor Zen Gesner.

== Death ==
Martin died on March 4, 2010, at her Malibu home, aged 82. She suffered from emphysema.

== Filmography ==
=== Film ===
Film
Year	Title	Role	Notes
1956	The Man in the Gray Flannel Suit	Polly Lawerence	Uncredited
1957	The Buster Keaton Story	Edna	
1958	The Mugger	Claire Townsend	
1963	Toys in the Attic	Charlotte Warkins	Uncredited
1964	Hamlet	Gertrude	
1965	Bus Riley's Back in Town	Mrs. Nichols	
1965	The Art of Love	Margo	
1968	For Love of Ivy	Doris Austin	
1968	Three in the Attic	Dean Nazarin	
1969	Goodbye, Columbus	Mrs. Ben Patimkin	
1973	The Young Nurses	Woman Reporter	
1975	The Other Side of the Mountain	June Kinmont	
1976	Jackson County Jail	Allison	
1976	Number One	Teacher	Short
1978	The Other Side of the Mountain Part 2	June Kinmont	
1980	A Small Circle of Friends	Mrs. Baxter	
1980	Loving Couples	Walter's Nurse	
1982	Some Kind of Hero	Hilda	
1982	Richard II	Duchess of York	Direct-to-video
1983	Doctor Detroit	Margaret Skridlow	
1984	All of Me	Divorce Lawyer	
1987	A Nightmare on Elm Street 3: Dream Warriors	Amanda Krueger / Sister Mary Helena	
1989	Animal Behavior	Mrs. Norton	
1995	Last Gasp	Mrs. Hardwick	
2000	Big Eden	Widow Thayer	
2000	Forever Lulu	Lulu Look-Alike	
2000	Cast Away	Kelly's Mother	
2001	Shallow Hal	Nurse Tanya Peeler	
2005	Greener Mountains	"M"	

=== Television ===
Television
Year	Title	Role	Notes
1952	Schlitz Playhouse of Stars		Season 2 episode 3: "I Want to Be a Movie Star"
1953	Hollywood Opening Night		Season 2 episode 25: "My Boss and I"
1955	Studio 57		Season 1 episode 25: "Center Ring"
1957	Robert Montgomery Presents		Season 8 episode 31: Victoria Regina
1959	NBC Sunday Showcase	Nancy	Season 1 episode 1: "People Kill People Sometimes"
1960	Moment of Fear		Episode 6: "Finger of Death"
1960	The Play of the Week	Lady Percy	Season 2 episode 1: Henry IV
1962	The New Breed	Margaret	Season 1 episode 21: "Wings for a Plush Horse"
1962	Ben Casey	Liza Bowers	Season 1 episode 25: "All the Clocks Are Ticking"
1962	The Untouchables	Stella Kurtz	Season 4 episode 6: "Bird in the Hand"
1963	The Eleventh Hour	Sophie Clayton	Season 1 episode 16: "Where Ignorant Armies Clash"
1963	The Twilight Zone	Laura Ford	Season 4 episode 15: "The Incredible World of Horace Ford"
1963	The Defenders	Grave Havelock	Season 3 episode 10: "Climate of Evil"
1964	The Reporter	Irene	Episode 4: "Rope's End"
1964	The Fugitive	Congresswoman Marian Snell / Paula Decker	2 episodes
1965	Perry Mason	Beth Fuller	Season 9 episode 2: "The Case of the Fatal Fortune"
1966	The Trials of O'Brien	Margo	Episode 15: "Alarums and Excursions"
1967	The Invaders	Dr. Maria McKinley	Season 2 episode 4: "Valley of the Shadow"
1969	The Mod Squad	Mrs. Barnes	Season 1 episode 14: "Hello Mother, My Name Is Julie"
1969	Mannix	Frances Jordan	Season 2 episode 21: "Odds Against Donald Jordan"
1969	Medical Center	Anne Filbey	Season 1 episode 6: "The Crooked Circle"
1969–1972	The F.B.I.	Eleanor Garnett / Susan Crane	3 episodes
1970	Mission Impossible	Grand Duchess Teresa	Season 4 episode 25: "The Choice"
1970	Lancer	Lizzie Cramer	Season 2 episode 23: "Goodbye, Lizzie"
1971	Bewitched	Martha Berkley	Season 7 episode 19: "Samantha and the Troll"
1971	The Young Lawyers	Elsa Novak	Episode 20: "And the Walls Came Tumbling Down"
1971	Longstreet	Mrs. Franklin	Episode 8: "The Girl with the Broom"
1972	The Sixth Sense	Dora Hallam	Season 2 episode 3: "Witness Within"
1972–1973	Owen Marshall, Counselor at Law	Mrs. Holden / Beatrice Cohen	2 episodes
1973	Room 222	Marie Clark	Season 5 episode 3: "Can Nun Be One Too Many?"
1973	The Streets of San Francisco	Prof. Talmadge	Season 2 episode 14: "Most Feared in the Jungle"
1974	The Wide World of Mystery	Catherine	Episode: "The Book of Murder"
1974	Remember When	Annie Hodges	TV movie
1975	Ellery Queen	Olivia Burns	Episode 6: "The Adventure of Miss Aggie's Farewell Performance"
1975–1981	Insight	Dr. Gersten / Elaine Ritter / Emma	3 episodes
1976–1977	Visions	Mrs. Gregg / Annie	2 episodes
1977	A Circle of Children	Doris Flemming	TV movie
1978	Outside Chance	Alison	TV movie
1978	Katie: Portrait of a Centerfold	Aunt Isabel	TV movie
1979	The Runaways	Helen Rossmore	Season 2 episode 7: "Throwaway Child"
1979	Mrs. R's Daughter	Mrs. Bergson	TV movie
1979	Family	Virgina Kabel	Season 5 episode 1: "Thanksgiving"
1979	Angie	Aunt Cooper	Season 2 episode 9: "Family Feud"
1980	The Golden Honeymoon	Cora Hartsell	TV movie
1981	Hart to Hart	Edith Tannen, R.N.	Season 2 episode 18: "Operation Murder"
1981	Dear Teacher	Karen Lipner	TV short
1982	St. Elsewhere	Mrs. Stevenson	Season 1 episode 8: "Tweety and Ralph"
1983	I Take These Men	Doris	TV movie
1983	The Thorn Birds	Sister Agatha	Mini-series "Part 1"
1983	The Winter of Discontent	Mrs. Baker	TV movie
1985–1986	The Twilight Zone	Margaret's Mother / First Nun	2 episodes / segments
1986	Mr. Sunshine	Grace D'Angelo	Main role
1986	Valerie	Aunt Josephine	Season 2 episode 7: "One of a Kind"
1986, 1988	My Sister Sam	Aunt Elsie	2 episodes
1986–1989	The Golden Girls	Frieda Claxton / Philomena Bosco	2 episodes
1987	Home Fires	Judge	TV movie
1987	Proud Men	Laura	TV movie
1987	Buck James	Helen Gallagher	Episode 3: "Too Close to Home"
1987	Star Trek: The Next Generation	Victoria Miller	Season 1 episode 11: "Haven"
1987	Frank's Place	Mrs. Weisberger	Episode 13: "Season's Greetings"
1988	L.A. Law	Hazel Brackman	Season 2 episode 15: "The Bald Ones"
1988	CBS Summer Playhouse	Arabia Vanderway Porter	Season 2 episode 3: "Old Money"
1988–1989	Fantastic Max	Additional voices	3 episodes
1989	Columbo	Rose Walker	Season 8 episode 2: "Murder, Smoke and Shadows"
1989	Major Dad	Miss Shields	Season 1 episode 12: "Boxer Rebellion"
1990	Father Dowling Mysteries	Mrs. Dansky	Season 2 episode 6: "The Ghost of a Chance Mystery"
1990	Over My Dead Body	Rose Haversham	Episode 2: "No Ifs, ands or Butlers"
1990	Matters of the Heart		TV movie
1991	A Woman Named Jackie	Diana Vreeland	Mini-series; 2 episodes
1991	Charlie Hoover	Marge	Episode 4: "Mother-in-Law"
1991–1992	Harry and the Hendersons	Dr. Arnesen	2 episodes
1991–1993	The Pirates of Dark Water	Additional voices	9 episodes
1992	Santa Barbara	Abigail Beckwithe	12 episodes
1992	Child of Rage	Barbara	TV movie
1993	Mother of the Bride	Beatrice	TV movie
1993	Baywatch	Dick's Wife	Season 4 episode 11: "The Child Inside"
1993	The Adventures of Brisco County, Jr.	Lil Swill	Episode 14: "Mail Order Brides"
1993	Harts of the West	Beverly	Episode 8: Jake's Brother"
1995	The 5 Mrs. Buchanans	Nana Buchanan	Episode 15: "Becoming a Buchanan"
1995	Sisters	Marjorie Markham	Season 6 episode 8: "Renaissance Woman"
1995–1999	The Drew Carey Show	Mrs. Louder	25 episodes
1996	Terror in the Family	Ivy	TV movie
1997	ER	Mrs. Curwane	Season 3 episode 22 “One for the Road”
1997	Chicago Hope	Mrs. Mankiewicz	Season 4 episode: "The Adventures of Baron Von Munchausen... by Proxy"
1997–1998	Suddenly Susan	Grandma Richmond	2 episodes
1998	The Practice	Judge Lydia Winchell	Season 2 episode 21: "In Deep"
1998	Maximum Bob	President of the Daughters of Stars and Bars	Episode 5: "Good Dog Karl"
1998	Profiler	Rose Fraley	Season 3 episode 7: "Perfect Helen"
2000	Murder in the Mirror		TV movie
2000	The Invisible Man	Gloria Howard	Season 1 episode 5: "Impetus"
2000	Gideon's Crossing	Mrs. Champion	Episode 1: "The Gift"
2000	Curb Your Enthusiasm	Woman on the road	Season 1 episode 3: "Porno Gil"
2000	The Michael Richards Show	Aunt Flossie	Episode 5: "The Nursing Home"
2001	The Song of the Lark	Mrs. Nathanmeyer	TV movie
2001	Crossing Jordan	Lydia	Season 1 episode 2: "The Dawn of a New Day"
2001	The Agency		Season 1 episode 5: "Pilot"
2002	Six Feet Under	Rita Piper	Season 2 episode 3: "The Plan"
2002	Strong Medicine	Edith Strauss	Season 3 episode 4: "Heartbeat"
2002	Push, Nevada	Eunice Blackwell	Episode 4: "Storybook Hero"
2002	Dancing at the Harvest Moon	Harriet Finnigan	TV movie
2003	Nip/Tuck	Adelle Coffin	Season 1 episode 10: "Adelle Coffin"
2004	Father of the Pride		Episode 8: "Donkey"
2005	NYPD Blue	Enid	Season 12 episode 16: "Old Man Quiver"
2005	CSI: Crime Scene Investigation	Daphne Eiger	Season 5 episode 15: "King Baby"
2005	Las Vegas		Season 2 episode 18: "To Protect and Serve Manicotti"
2005	Thicker than Water	Abygail Jordan	TV movie
2005	Mrs. Harris	Mama Tarnower	TV movie
