= Ole Rex =

1961 film

- Theatrical release poster
- Directed by: Robert Hinkle
- Written by: Robert Hinkle; Jack Specht
- Produced by: Robert Hinkle; Charles E. King
- Starring: Billy Hughes; Bill Coontz; Robert Hinkle; Whitey Hughes; William Hughes; Richard McCarty
- Music by: Don Bagley; William Hinshaw
- Production company: Universal Pictures
- Distributed by: Universal Pictures
- Release date: May 1, 1961
- Running time: 80 minutes
- Country: United States
- Language: English

Ole Rex is a 1961 American Western film directed by Robert Hinkle and written by Robert Hinkle and Jack Specht. The film stars Billy Hughes, Bill Coontz, Robert Hinkle, Whitey Hughes, William Hughes and Richard McCarty. The film was released on May 1, 1961, by Universal Pictures.

== Cast ==
- Billy Hughes as Chris Owens
- Bill Coontz as Jake Owens
- Robert Hinkle as Sheriff McCarty
- Whitey Hughes as Cotton Bearden
- William Hughes as Curly Bearden
- Richard McCarty as Deputy Sheriff
- Red Bray as Rancher
- Robert Marlow Jr. as Prospector
- Dale Terry as Geologist
- Charles E. King as the Owner of Rocking K
- Jim Cochran as the Deputy
