= The Two Worlds of Jennie Logan =

1979 television film by Frank De Felitta

- Genre: Drama; Romance; Sci-Fi
- Based on: Second Sight by David L. Williams
- Written by: Frank De Felitta
- Directed by: Frank De Felitta
- Starring: Lindsay Wagner; Marc Singer; Linda Gray; Alan Feinstein; Henry Wilcoxon; Irene Tedrow; Joan Darling; Gloria Stuart
- Music by: Glenn Paxton
- Country of origin: United States
- Original language: English

Production
- Executive producers: Charles W. Fries; Ron Samuels; Joe Wizan
- Producers: Betty Gunn; Paul B. Radin
- Production locations: Camarillo Ranch House, 201 Camarillo Ranch Road, Camarillo, California
- Cinematography: Al Francis
- Editor: John F. Schreyer
- Running time: 96 minutes
- Production companies: Joe Wizan Television Productions; Fries Enterprises

Original release
- Network: CBS
- Release: October 31, 1979

The Two Worlds of Jennie Logan is a 1979 American made-for-television drama film adapted from David L. Williams' 1978 novel Second Sight. The film stars Lindsay Wagner in the title role. It also stars Marc Singer, Linda Gray, Alan Feinstein and Henry Wilcoxon. It was directed by Frank De Felitta, who also adapted Williams's novel into this screenplay.

A woman finds an antique dress in her attic, and after putting it on, finds herself flashing back 80 years in the past, where she falls in love with a grieving painter. Soon, she finds herself bouncing back and forth between the two realities, and becomes obsessed with solving an 80-year-old murder.

== Plot ==
Michael Logan and his wife, Jennie, are trying to salvage their marriage after Jennie finds out about Michael's infidelity. They move into an old Victorian house in rural New England. In the attic, Jennie, who is a Victorian at heart, finds an authentic Victorian white dress under a protective cover, thick with dust. The dress is intact except for one small tear at the shoulder.

After having the dress repaired, Jennie decides to wear it and admires herself in the mirror in the attic. She develops an excruciating headache, and the room swirls around her. When the headache ceases, she finds herself still up in the attic and in the dress, but the attic is now an artist's studio, complete with Victorian decor. She hears a woman scream and a man's voice downstairs yelling, "Pamela." Terrified, Jennie shuts her eyes and finds herself back in the present.

At first she assumes she was dreaming or hallucinating, yet Jennie experiences further similar episodes. She decides to learn more about her new house and goes to the local historical museum, where an elderly curator named Mrs. Bates explains to her that the house belonged to artist David Reynolds in the year 1899. She explains how David claimed to have seen the ghost of his dead wife several times and called out to her, but she disappeared each time. David died under mysterious circumstances on the night of the turn of the century. Legend has it that he was murdered during a duel, or that the woman he loved killed him, but no-one knows for certain. Also at the museum is a painting that Mrs. Bates says is a portrait of David's wife Pamela. Mrs. Bates remarks on the woman's striking resemblance to Jennie.

Intrigued, Jennie keeps going back and forth between the two worlds by wearing the antique dress. When David first sees her again, he mistakes her for Pamela but quickly learns that it isn't her when Jennie introduces herself. Jennie realizes that what David mistook for his wife's ghostly appearances were really Jennie appearing in and out of time. When Jennie confides in her husband Michael, he doesn't believe she is really time-traveling and thinks that she is losing her sanity. He urges her to go see a psychiatrist, Dr. Erica Lauren.

Mrs. Bates takes Jennie to see "Aunt Betty", an extremely old woman who was alive at the time of David's murder. However, she is unable to shed any light on the situation.

Jennie and David fall in love in 1899, but David's sister-in-law, Elizabeth Harrington, is also in love with him. However, her father disapproves of David and blames him for Pamela's accidental death. During their time together, David reveals to Jennie that he is working on a portrait, which turns out to be the same one that Jennie saw in the museum in the present and is in fact a portrait of Jennie, not Pamela.

Pamela's father later challenges David to a duel on the night of the turn of the century, the night that David died.

In the present, Jennie tries to find out how she can prevent David's death. Michael gives her a locket which she promises to always wear. Mrs. Bates later calls Jennie and says that "Aunt Betty" wants to make a death bed confession. "Aunt Betty" reveals that she is really Elizabeth and that she was responsible for David's murder. During the duel, Elizabeth was hiding with a gun which she used to shoot David.

Jennie rushes to save David in the past but she is confronted by Michael, who suspects her of inventing the entire delusion to cover up for an ordinary affair with someone in their time. He tries to prevent her from going up to the attic, in the process ripping the shoulder of Jennie's dress, and bringing it back to the state in which it was originally found. He chases her up the stairs, but she manages to block his path by locking the door. Jennie escapes into the past world to stop the duel and try to save David's life. Jennie spots Elizabeth, but appears to be shot when she tries to prevent the murder.

In the present, Michael manages to break into the attic, but he is too late. He discovers the lifeless body of Jennie lying on the bed. He grieves her death and she is later buried.

Later, as Michael is preparing to move, the movers stumble onto a number of paintings in the attic. He goes through them, only to see that they are of his wife, wearing the locket he gave her and showing the life she led in the past with David. They include a portrait of Jennie on a ship, her holding a child in a room in Paris, and Jennie in old age. Michael remembers everything Jennie said, and begins to cry, finally realizing that his wife was right the entire time.

== Cast ==
- Lindsay Wagner as Jennie Logan
- Marc Singer as David Reynolds
- Alan Feinstein as Michael Logan
- Linda Gray as Elizabeth Harrington
- Henry Wilcoxon as Harrington
- Joan Darling as Dr. Erica Lauren
- Irene Tedrow as Mrs. Bates
- Peter Hobbs as Old John
- Constance McCashin as Beverly

== Differences from the novel ==
In the novel, Jennie merely finds a drawing of the dress and has a replica made, whereas in the film she finds an actual dress.

There is also no duel in the book and no turn-of-the-century ball; an old news clipping reveals that David was killed outside a hotel in the town. The events leading up to his death are considerably more complicated in the novel, involving a younger sister of his deceased wife's whom David tries to help elope with her boyfriend.

== Reception ==
Critical reception was very mixed.
