= Constance McCashin =

American actress

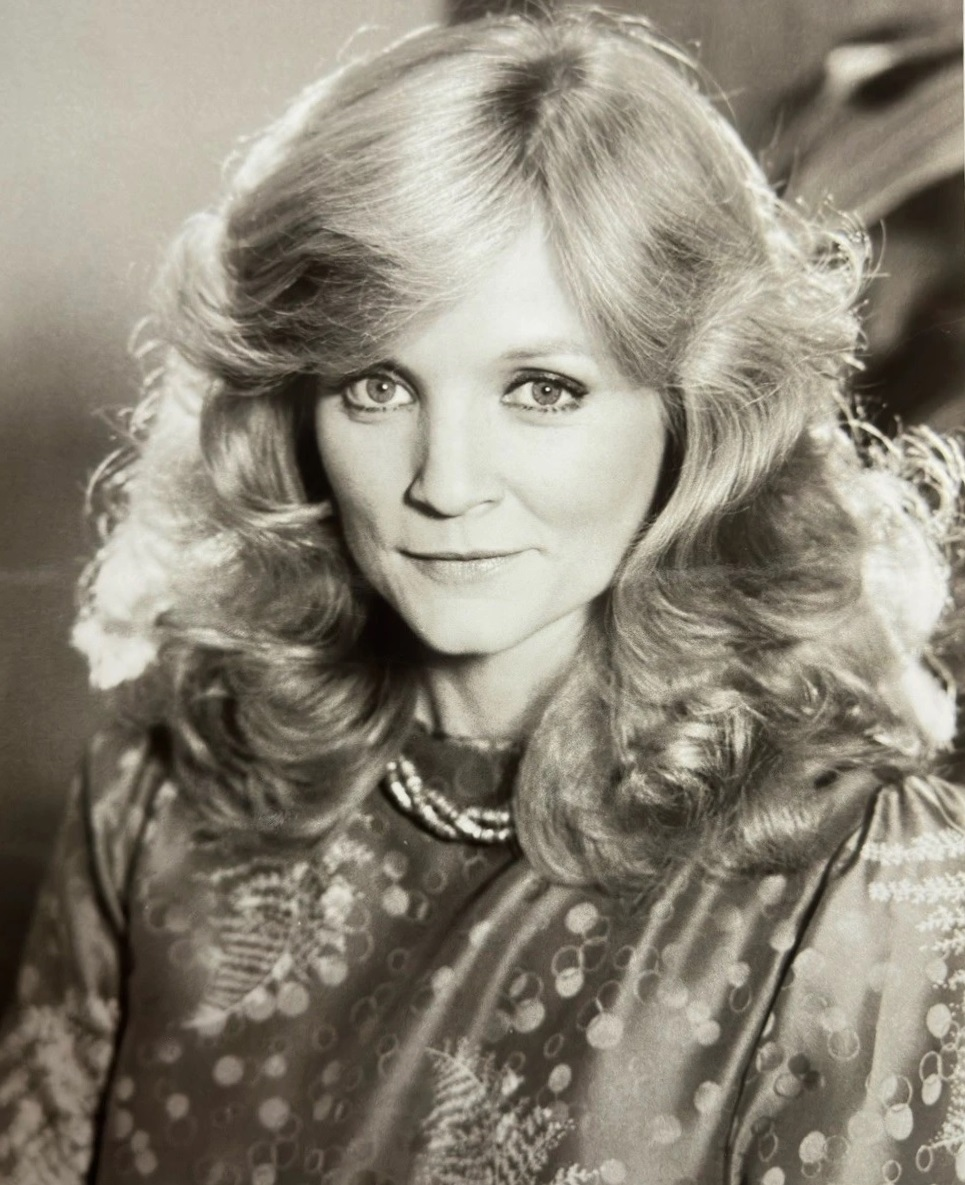
- Born: June 18, 1947 (age 79); Chicago, Illinois, U.S.
- Occupation: Actress
- Years active: 1976–1999
- Spouse: Sam Weisman (m. 1978)
- Children: 2

Constance McCashin (born June 18, 1947) is an American psychotherapist and former actress from Chicago, best known for her role as Laura Avery Sumner in the CBS prime time soap opera Knots Landing.

== Career ==
McCashin is best known for her role as Laura Avery Sumner on the prime time drama Knots Landing, which she played from the show's debut in 1979 until its 200th episode in 1987. McCashin's character and that of fellow actress Julie Harris were written out of the show due to cost-cutting measures, with McCashin's succumbing to a brain tumor. Of the decision, McCashin said, "I was very hurt the way I was let go for financial reasons. I wish they'd handled my demise better".

During her career, McCashin starred in a number of made-for-television movies and appeared in several episodes of the CBS sitcom Brooklyn Bridge in the role of Rosemary Monahan. She was a contestant on the Dick Clark-hosted $25,000 Pyramid and a panelist on Super Password. She also competed with the CBS team during a 1984 edition of Battle of the Network Stars. She made her final screen appearance playing a supporting role in the 1999 comedy film The Out-of-Towners.

McCashin appeared at the TV Land Awards in April 2009 for the 30th anniversary of Knots Landing along with castmates including Kevin Dobson, Lisa Hartman Black, Michele Lee, Donna Mills, Don Murray, Michelle Phillips, Ted Shackelford, and Joan Van Ark.

After her Hollywood career, McCashin became a social worker and therapist, specializing in the treatment of eating disorders and body image issues.

== Personal life ==
McCashin lives in West Newton, Massachusetts with her husband, producer Sam Weisman. They have two children, Marguerite and Daniel, the latter of whom played the baby of McCashin's character on Knots Landing.

== Television/Filmography ==
| Year | Title | Role | Notes |
|---|---|---|---|
| 1976 | "First Ladies Diaries: Edith Wilson" | Altrude | Television film |
| 1978 | "Special Olympics" | Trina Cunningham | Television film |
| 1978 | "The Many Loves of Arthur" | Karen | Television film |
| 1978 | "Daddy, I Don't Like It Like This" | Marge | Television film |
| 1978 | "Family" | Ms. Massey | 1 episode |
| 1978 | "Who's Watching the Kids" | Sybil | 1 episode |
| 1979 | "Married: The First Year" | Cheryl Huffman | TV drama series |
| 1979 | "The Two Worlds of Jennie Logan" | Beverly | Television film |
| 1983 | "Hotel" | Allison Brunell | 1 episode |
| 1984 | "Love Thy Neighbor" | Sally Loeb | Television film |
| 1984 | "Obsessive Love" | Jackie Stevens | Television film |
| 1985 | "Love on the Run" | Elizabeth Nellison | Television film |
| 1979-1987 | "Knots Landing" | Laura Avery Sumner | Series regular, 198 episodes TV Land Award - Anniversary Award (2009); Nominated - Soap Opera Digest Award for Outstanding Actress in a Supporting Role on a Prime Time Serial (1986) |
| 1988 | "The Child Saver" | Beverly McCumber | Television film |
| 1988 | "Family Ties" | Evelyn Mitchum | 1 episode |
| 1988 | "Nightmare at Bittercreek" | Connie Senia | Television film |
| 1990 | Naked Tango | Flora | Theatrical film |
| 1991-1993 | "Brooklyn Bridge" | Rosemary Monahan | 6 episodes |
| 1994 | D2: The Mighty Ducks | Shopkeeper | uncredited, Theatrical film |
| 1995 | "In the Heat of the Night" | Pauline Given Ryan | 1 episode |
| 1999 | The Out-of-Towners | Mrs. Wellstone | Theatrical film |
