= Thicker than Water (2005 film) =

2005 American television film

- Written by: J.P. Martin
- Directed by: David S. Cass Sr.
- Starring: Melissa Gilbert; Lindsay Wagner
- Theme music composer: Kevin Kliesch
- Country of origin: United States
- Original language: English

Production
- Producers: Albert T. Dickerson III; Robert Halmi Jr.
- Cinematography: James W. Wrenn
- Editor: Jennifer Jean Cacavas
- Running time: 90 minutes
- Production company: Larry Levinson Productions

Original release
- Network: Hallmark Channel
- Release: March 12, 2005

Thicker than Water is a 2005 American made-for-television drama film starring Melissa Gilbert and Lindsay Wagner. It premiered on Hallmark Channel on March 12, 2005.

== Plot summary ==
After the death of her father, Natalie Travers discovers he was married to a rodeo star before he married Natalie's mother. Upset that her father kept part of his life a secret from her and bewildered over how a prominent judge could fall for a cowgirl, she sets out to find Maggie Mae Jarrett. But Natalie meets Maggie's daughter Jessie Mae Jarrett, who is struggling to keep the wild horses on her land alive and safe.

== Cast ==
- Melissa Gilbert as Natalie Travers
- Lindsay Wagner as Jess Jarrett
- Brian Wimmer as Sam Nelson
- Lindy Newton as Lulu Nichols
- Robert Mailhouse as Larry Gorman
- Grainger Hines as Tom Grove
- Nan Martin as Abygail Jordan
- Sondra Currie as Sally
