= Mary Carver =

American actress (1924–2013)

- Mary Carver in Simon & Simon, 1988
- Born: Mary Carvellas; May 3, 1924; Los Angeles, California, U.S.
- Died: October 18, 2013 (aged 89); Woodland Hills, California, U.S.
- Spouse: Joseph Sargent (m. 1952; div. 1968)
- Children: 2, including Lia Sargent

Mary Carvellas (May 3, 1924 – October 18, 2013), better known as Mary Carver, was an American actress whose career spanned more than 60 years. She may be best known for her role as matriarch Cecilia Simon on the series Simon & Simon appearing in 153 episodes from 1981 to 1989 over eight seasons.

== Early life ==
Carver was born in Los Angeles, the daughter of John and Carmen (née Delmar) Carvellas. Carver graduated from Hollywood High School and Los Angeles City College.

== Career ==
Carver appeared in the Broadway production of Out West of Eighth in 1951. She appeared on Broadway in The Shadow Box in 1977 and in Fifth of July during the 1980s.

Her films included From Here to Eternity (1953), Pay or Die (1960), I Never Promised You a Rose Garden (1977), Protocol (1984), Best Seller (1987), Arachnophobia (1990), and Safe (1995).

Her television roles included Simon & Simon, The Donna Reed Show, ER, The Guardian, Gunsmoke (1956 title character-“Anne” - in “Chester’s Mail Order Bride” - S1E34), Lou Grant, Lux Video Theatre, The Man from U.N.C.L.E., Mannix, Mary Hartman, Mary Hartman, McCloud, Quincy, M.E., The Rockford Files, Star Trek: Enterprise, and The Twilight Zone.

In addition to acting, Carver taught within the theater department of the University of Southern California.

== Personal life ==
Carver married film director Joseph Sargent in 1952. They had two daughters, Athena Sargent and voice actress Lia Sargent, and divorced in 1968.

== Death ==
Carver died on October 18, 2013, following a brief illness at her home in Woodland Hills, California. She was 89 years old. She was survived by her daughters.

== Filmography ==
Year	Title	Role	Notes
1951	Goodbye, My Fancy	Joan Wintner	Uncredited
1953	From Here to Eternity	Nancy	Uncredited
1956	Bigger Than Life	Saleslady	Uncredited
1956	Emergency Hospital	Anna Banks	Uncredited
1958	Kathy O'	Marge	
1959	The Wild and the Innocent	Bit Role	Uncredited
1960	Pay or Die	Mrs. Rossi	
1963	The Twilight Zone	Betty O'Brien	Season 4 Episode 15: "The Incredible World of Horace Ford"
1968	The Virginian	Mrs Baldwin	Season 6 Episode 11: "To Bear Witness"
1970	Dream No Evil	Policewoman	
1972	Glass Houses		
1977	3 Women	Nurse	Uncredited
1977	I Never Promised You a Rose Garden	Eugenia	
1977	The Rockford Files	Receptionist 1	Season 3 Episode 22: "Dirty Money, Black Light"
1984	Protocol	Mrs. Davis	
1987	Best Seller	Cleve's Mother	
1990	Arachnophobia	Margaret Hollins	
1995	Safe	Nell	
