= The Hundred Days of the Dragon =

- The Outer Limits episode
- Episode no.: Season 1 Episode 2
- Directed by: Byron Haskin
- Written by: Allan Balter; Robert Mintz
- Cinematography by: Conrad Hall
- Production code: 7
- Original air date: September 23, 1963

Guest appearances
- Sidney Blackmer; Phillip Pine; Mark Roberts

Episode chronology
← Previous "The Galaxy Being"	Next → "The Architects of Fear"

"The Hundred Days of the Dragon" is an episode of the original The Outer Limits television show. It first aired on September 23, 1963, during the first season.

== Introduction ==
An Asian government develops a reliable means of changing a person's physical appearance and fingerprints, by rendering tissues "malleable in molecular arrangement", and uses it to replace a U.S. presidential candidate with his double.

== Opening narration ==
Somewhere south of the Mongolian border and north of the Tropic of Cancer, in that part of the world we call the Orient, a slumbering giant has shaken itself to wakefulness. Passed over in most histories as a nation forgotten by time, its close-packed millions in the short span of twenty years have been stirred to a fury by one man: Li-Chin Sung. A benevolent despot in his homeland, Sung stands as an irresponsible threat to peace in the eyes of the rest of the world. William Lyons Selby, candidate for the presidency of the United States, predicted by every poll, survey, and primary to be a certain winner in the forthcoming election.

== Plot ==
An undisclosed Asian government plans to take over America by infiltrating and substituting officials at the White House. During the presidential campaign, William Lyons Selby, the candidate predicted to win the election, is murdered and replaced by a lookalike. Selby is indeed elected, and the impostor assumes the office of President of the United States.

Though "Selby" fools the nation at large during his first few months in office, his daughter, Carol, soon begins to suspect that the man in the President is not her father. She observes that "Selby" remembers dates and other publicly available information, but forgets private information, such as his food preferences and details of her husband's research projects. Carol voices her concerns to the Vice President, Ted Pearson, who disbelieves her until he is targeted for replacement by an assassin resembling Pearson who breaks into his residence, is discovered lying in wait, and is chased off before he can effect the replacement.

Carol's husband, a physician and medical researcher, recalls that a peer-reviewed scientific journal disclosed Soviet experiments wherein a hominid animal's soft tissue had been successfully altered, and he speculated that the "serum" which was employed had been advanced significantly beyond that which was previously disclosed, to include human subjects, and he explains this to the Vice President. Now convinced that Carol's expressed concerns are plausible, Pearson informs Frank Summers—the head of the Secret Service detail assigned to the White House—of the plot, and his suspicion that "Selby" is actually an impostor, but Summers' team fails to confirm "Selby's" true identity using forensic science.

Prior to a planned summit meeting, the leader of the Asian government confers with "Selby", wherein he reveals the second phase of his conspiracy—to replace various members of the Cabinet and numerous industry leaders in order to complete his takeover of America. When "Selby" arranges a second attempt at replacing the Pearson, the conspirators, including Pearson's doppelgänger, are captured, brought before a state reception, and, along with "Selby," are publicly exposed, with the real Pearson placing the lookalike under arrest, but not before permanently disfiguring him by using the formula. Summers proposes an armed response against the Asian government, but Pearson, now as President, declines.

== Closing narration ==
To Theodore Pearson, not even so monstrous a crime as the assassination of William Lyons Selby justifies an act of war, because there is no war as we know it, only annihilation. A great American has been killed in the service of his country. Now it is the job of those who continue to serve to carry on guarding our freedom with dignity and unrelenting vigilance.

== Cast ==
- Sidney Blackmer – as William Lyons Selby, and Selby's doppelgänger Ho Chi-Wong
- Phillip Pine – as Theodore Pearson, and Pearson's doppelgänger
- Joan Camden – as Ann Pearson
- Nancy Rennick – as Carol Selby Conner
- Richard Loo – as Li-Chin Sung
- Mark Roberts – as Dr. Bob Conner
- Aki Aleong – as Dr. Sui-Lin
- Clarence Lung – as Major (later, Colonel) Ho Chi-Wong
- James Hong – as Wen Lee
- James Yagi – as Li Kwan
- Bert Remsen – as Frank Summers (Secret Service officer)
- Dennis McCarthy – as Carter
- Richard Gillings – as Briggs
- Robert Brubaker – as Bryan
- Eugene Chan – as Man in Hotel
- Henry Scott – as FBI Agent Marshall
- Vic Perrin – as Voice of Mr. Schumacher
- Leslie Stevens – as the Election Returns Commentator (uncredited)

== Notes ==
- The plot bears some similarity to that of the novel The Manchurian Candidate by Richard Condon and the 1962 film adaptation starring Frank Sinatra. There are also similarities to Black Dragons (1942) starring Bela Lugosi.
- The episode was featured in the film Mrs. Doubtfire (1993). The kids were watching this episode before Mrs. Doubtfire arrived at the Hillard residence, at about 36 minutes into the film.
- Selby is missing half of the third finger of his left hand. Actor Sidney Blackmer co-starred in the film, Third Finger, Left Hand (1940).
