= Phillip Pine =

American actor

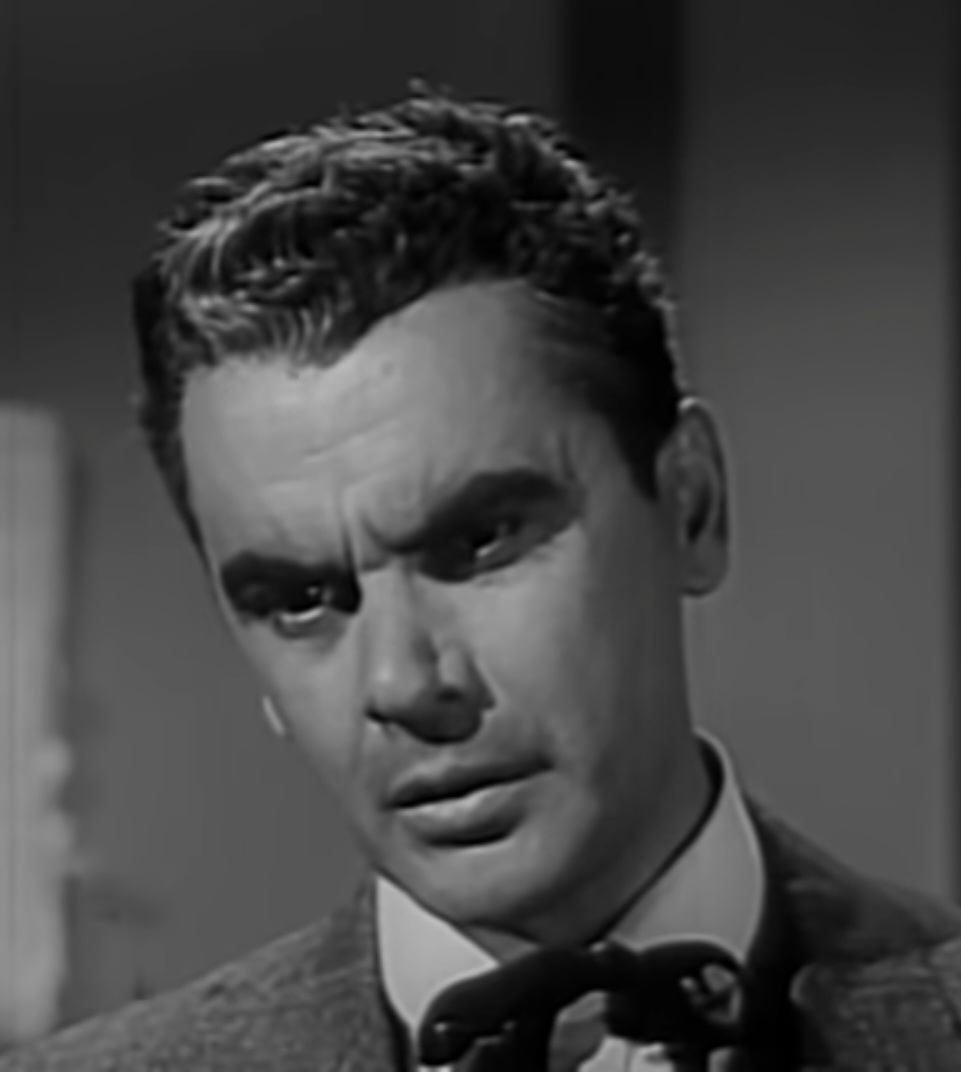
- Pine in an episode of One Step Beyond (1960)
- Born: Phillip Edmund Pine; July 16, 1920; Hanford, California, U.S.
- Died: December 22, 2006 (aged 86); Las Vegas, Nevada, U.S.
- Occupation: Actor
- Years active: 1945–2005

Phillip Pine (July 16, 1920 – December 22, 2006) was an American film and television actor, writer, film director, and producer.

== Early life ==
Pine was born in Hanford, California, the son of immigrants from Portugal. The family name was Pinheiro, which Pine stated in an interview was changed at Ellis Island. His father Miguel Pine ran a general store and meat market in downtown Hanford. His family moved to Santa Cruz when he was five.

He served in the United States Army during World War II. After the war, he settled in his native California and earned his degree in theatrical arts from the UCLA under the G.I. Bill.

== Career ==
Pine played John Wesley Hardin in a 1955 episode of The Life and Legend of Wyatt Earp (John Wesley Hardin, S1 E9). In a 1957 episode of the same series, Pine again played Hardin (The Time for All Good Men, S2 E39). Later that year, he appeared on Gunsmoke as “Vint”, a cheating card dealer turned murderer in the episode “Moon”.

Pine appeared in two episodes of Adventures of Superman titled "The Mystery of the Broken Statues" and "The Case of the Talkative Dummy". In the latter, he played a theater usher who was part of a robbery gang. Pine played a confessed bank robber in the ninth episode of the television series Peter Gunn titled "Image of Sally", first aired November 17, 1958.

He appeared in three episodes of Wagon Train titled "The Ben Courtney Story", "The Esteban Zamora Story" in 1959 and “The Dr. Swift Cloud Story” in 1960 (as Straight Arrow). Pine played Kid Curry in the episode "Kid Curry" on the TV series Tales of Wells Fargo (1959). He appeared as mobster Jack Zuta in the third episode of The Untouchables titled "The Jake Lingle Killing" and in 1962 he co-starred in the episode "The Whitey Steele Story".

He appeared in two episodes of The Twilight Zone, "The Four of Us Are Dying", and "The Incredible World of Horace Ford". He also appeared in The Fugitive. Pine was in the second episode of The Outer Limits titled "The Hundred Days of the Dragon". He made a 1964 appearance as Phillip Stewart in the Perry Mason episode, "The Case of the Wednesday Woman".

In 1964 Pine guest starred on Combat! as Pvt. Steve Cantrell in the third season episode "Birthday Cake". He played a World War II submarine captain marooned inside an underwater cave with four other survivors in the 1965 Voyage to the Bottom of the Sea episode "And Five of Us Are Left".

In 1967, Pine appeared in an episode of The Invaders titled "Genesis". Pine also appeared in an episode of Rawhide titled "Incident at Dangerfield Dip". He also played a gangster known only as "Mark" in Irving Lerner's film noir classic, Murder by Contract.

He appeared in an episode of Kojak (season 5) called "Cry for the Children" as "Eddie Creagan", in an episode of Ironside (season 3) called "Alias Mrs Braithwaite" and in Hawaii Five-O (season 1) called "Full Fathom 5". Notably, he played a Japanese man in a later Hawaii Five-O episode called "Which Way Did They Go?"

In 1969, Pine appeared in a Star Trek episode of season 3, "The Savage Curtain", as the genocidal Earth warlord Colonel Green. In that same year, he was in the 9th Episode of Adam 12's second season playing defense attorney Dudley Gray.

Pine also appeared in the first season of Barnaby Jones in the episode titled "Murder in the Doll's House" (03/25/1973).

== Partial filmography ==
- The Sailor Takes a Wife (1945) - Aide (uncredited)
- The Street with No Name (1948) - Monk (uncredited)
- I Shot Jesse James (1949) - Man in Saloon
- The Set-Up (1949) - Souza
- Red Light (1949) - Pablo Cabrillo
- Battleground (1949) - G.I. Non-Com (uncredited)
- D.O.A. (1949) - Angelo (uncredited)
- My Foolish Heart (1949) - Sergeant Lucey
- The Flame and the Arrow (1950) - One of Dardo's Band (uncredited)
- Insurance Investigator (1951) - 2nd Hood
- The Wild Blue Yonder (1951) - Sergeant Tony
- Hoodlum Empire (1952) - Louis Barretti
- Black Tuesday (1954) - Fiaschetti (uncredited)
- The Phantom from 10,000 Leagues (1955) - George Thomas
- The Price of Fear (1956) - Vince Burton
- Men in War (1957) - Sergeant Riordan
- Gunsmoke (1957) - Vin
- Desert Hell (1958) - Corporal Carlo Parini
- Murder by Contract (1958) - Marc
- The Lost Missile (1958) - Dr. Joe Freed
- The Big Fisherman (1959) - Lucius
- Combat!, "Birthday Cake" (1964) - Private Steve Cantrell
- Brainstorm (1965) - Dr. Ames
- Dead Heat on a Merry-Go-Round (1966) - George Logan
- Project X (1968) - Dr. Lee Craig
- Hook, Line & Sinker (1969) - Head Surgeon
- The Cat Ate the Parakeet (1972) - Earl
- Glass Houses (1972) - Ted
- Money to Burn (1983) - Dean Hayden
- Run If You Can (1988) - Kudelski

=== Television ===
Year	Title	Role	Notes
1958	Alfred Hitchcock Presents	Victor Manett	Season 3, Episode 36: "The Safe Place"
1958	Peter Gunn	Si Robbin	Season 1, Episode 9: "Image of Sally"
1959	Tales of Wells Fargo	Harvey Logan	Season 3, Episode 35: "Kid Curry"
1959	Wanted: Dead or Alive	Tom Dunn	Season 2, Episode 4: "Breakout"
1959	Rawhide	Reese Dangerfield	Season 2, Episode 2: "Incident at Dangerfield Dip"
1963	The Twilight Zone	Leonard O'Brien	Season 4, Episode 15: "The Incredible World of Horace Ford"
1963	The Outer Limits	Theodore Pearson (and doppelgänger)	Season 1, Episode 2: "The Hundred Days of the Dragon"
1963	Kraft Suspense Theatre	Mr. Ellis	Season 1, Episode 6: "One Step Down"
1967	The Invaders	Sgt Hal Corman	Season 1, Episode 5: "Genesis"
1967	Mannix	William Larkin	Season 1, Episode 5: "Make It Like It Never Happened"
1969	Star Trek: The Original Series	Colonel Green	Season 3, Episode 22: "The Savage Curtain"
1980	Little House on the Prairie	Winthrop Morgan	S6:E15, "Whatever Happened to the Class of '56?"
