= Nightmare at Bittercreek =

1988 film by Tim Burstall

- Genre: Action; Thriller
- Written by: Greg McCarty; Scott Swanton
- Directed by: Tim Burstall
- Starring: Lindsay Wagner; Tom Skerritt; Constance McCashin; Joanna Cassidy
- Theme music composer: Arthur B. Rubinstein
- Countries of origin: Australia; United States
- Original language: English

Production
- Executive producers: Peter Guber; Jon Peters
- Producer: Scott Swanson
- Cinematography: Jacques Steyn
- Editor: John F. Link
- Running time: 100 min.
- Production companies: Phoenix Entertainment Group; Swanton Films

Original release
- Network: CBS
- Release: May 24, 1988

Nightmare at Bittercreek is a 1988 American-Australian made-for-television action-thriller film directed by Tim Burstall.

Phoenix Entertainment Group and Swanton Films produced the film. The VHS version was distributed by Lions Gate Entertainment, while the DVD version was distributed by Trinity Home Entertainment.

== Plot ==
The film is about a group of women on a hiking trip who are chased by 4 deadly racist Aryan survivalists. A drunkard named Ding and Bully is their guide. As they ascend on horseback, they discover the planned trail is blocked. Ding takes them on a separate trail to go around the rock slide. They discover their husbands, who are hunting on the mountain, (except Nita’s) may have gone to lower Sky High. They decide to wait for their husbands at Sky High in case they show up where they are (at Sky High).

Ding (who opts to stay overnight) and Bully (who wants to go back) fight over whether to stay overnight at Sky High. Bully is beaten and Ding instructs him to go to lower Sky High and wait for the husbands.

Ding tells the women that the “rock slide” was likely done with explosives, based on his experience.

The FBI and local police continue to hunt for the 4 Aryans. it is revealed they have murdered several people and are very dangerous.

Ding and the women camp overnight. Ding thinks he hears soneone call his name. He goes looking with his dog and finds Bully’s horse has been shot. He tells the women they have to leave immediately. Ding again hears Bully plead for his life and then a shot.

Ding releases the horses hoping whoever it is will follow the horses. They run and hear the horses being shot. The Aryans arrive at the camp and search their belongings.

Gil (who owns the horses) gets a call from one of the husbands advising they had to return as the other husband (Jack) broke his ankle. Gil tells them the women have a guide to get down the mountain and they’ll be fine.

Ding starts to feel ill and tells the wonen to scale up and then head down to the water. What he really wanted was to be alone to take a drink.

Nita sees one of the Aryans attack Ding and they fall into the water. Ding manages to use the axe to send the arian down the warerfall. Nita reaches Ding and they continue along the water to meet the others. They discuss Ding going for help alone or one of them going with him. He goes with Buster, his dog.

The police receive word of 4 women and 2 packers going missing. They realize that’s where Iron Nest (Aryan hide-out) is located.

Ding sets off a grenade and is injured. The women hear Buster barking and on Tracy’s radio they hear the Aryans. They are chasing Buster. Buster arrives where the wonen are. Ding wakes up and Buster arrives with the women. They keep moving as the Aryans are chasing them. They attempt to climb out by going up a rock face. Ding stays behind to get the one guy who is closest to them. One of them grabs Nita as she climbs and she falls back into the water. The Aryans grabs her again and Buster attacks him. Ding goes after the Aryans and he shoots both Buster and Ding. Nita grabs the gun and the Aryan staggers off and collapses.

Nita and Ding make it back to the others. Another Aryan approaches with a flashlight. Ding hands Nita the gun. They all enter the water and go over the waterfall. They grab Ding and pull him from the water. Tracy has injured her arm. They run through the woods. Allison sees another Aryan and runs. Allison trips and falls, landing on the dead Aryan Ding killed.

They find a grenade on the Aryan and Ding throws it, killing another Aryan. Nita takes his gun and hears on his radio that they will likely be raped if they catch them. Nita says there are 2 left. They realize they have to kill the first one that finds them and get his gun. They hide Tracy.

Ding tells them they will have to kill the Aryans. The Aryans move toward the women. One comes into view. Ding and the women have set up the dead arian as bait. As he approaches, Coonie attacks him and he shoots her. Tracy screams and rushes to her mother. The Aryan grabs Tracy and Nita attacks him from behind, stabbing him with a knife.

Nita returns fire as they shoot, and is shot in the shoulder. Allison screams and grabs the rifle. As the last Aryan approaches, she fires at him repeatedly, killing him.

The police arrive in a helicopter, comnfirming there are 4 bodies. They also see 5 people alive. Ding hears Buster, who is wounded. Tracy locates Buster. The helicopter takes Ding and Buster away in a stretcher. They both survive, as do all the women.

== Cast ==
- Lindsay Wagner as Nita Daniels
- Tom Skerritt as Ding
- Constance McCashin as Connie Senia
- Joanna Cassidy as Allison Shapiro
- Janne Mortil as Tracy Senia
- Dwight McFee as Bully
