= Billy Hughes (actor) =

American actor

- As a young gunman in The Rifleman episode "The Sidewinder"
- Born: Billy Eugene Hughes, Jr. November 28, 1948; Los Angeles, California, United States
- Died: December 20, 2005 (aged 57); Alma, Arkansas, United States
- Occupation: Actor
- Years active: 1960–1978
- Notable work: My Six Loves (1963)
- Television: Gunsmoke, Wagon Train, Twilight Zone, Lassie, The Rifleman, among others.

Billy Eugene Hughes, Jr. (November 28, 1948 – December 20, 2005) was an American actor best known for various television and film roles he played during the 1960s. His Hollywood lineage included both his father (Bill Hughes) and uncle (Whitey Hughes), who were both stuntmen and film producers.

== Television roles ==
Between 1960 and 1964 Hughes appeared in over a dozen television programs, beginning with Robert Taylor's Detectives, where he played the role of Bobby Marx in the episode "The Little Witness". Other TV work included The Shirley Temple Show, Leave It to Beaver, Gunsmoke, The Twilight Zone, Dr. Kildare, Wagon Train, and Lassie.

Hughes appeared in three different episodes of Gunsmoke between 1961 and '62, playing the roles of Joey Glover (in "Millie"), Timmy (in "Us Haggens"), which introduced Ken Curtis in the role of Festus, and Tommy. From 1961 to 1964 he also had three appearances on Wagon Train (playing Adam Bancroft as a Boy, Mark Basham, and Matt). Two of his three appearances on Lassie were in the role of Billy Joe (in the 1961 episodes "Cracker Jack" and "Yochim's Christmas"), while in 1964 he played Ricky Sutton in the episode "Climb the Mountain Slowly".

Hughes also appeared in three episodes of The Rifleman: "Long Gun From Tucson", "Day of Reckoning", and "Sidewinder". In "Sidewinder", he had a lead role playing 13-year-old Gridley Maule Jr., a young gunman seeking vengeance for his father's death. Filmed while he was still only thirteen years old, Hughes displayed remarkable talent at handling a Colt revolver. According to a close friend of Hughes, this was one of his favorite roles.

=== Television appearances ===
Program	Season	Episode #	Series #	Air Date	Title	Role	Notes	Ref(s)
Detectives	2	7	40	11/11/1960	"The Little Witness"	Bobby Marx	Credit: Billy Hughes	
Law and Mr. Jones	1	6	6	11/18/1960	"The Promise of Life"	Paul Rice	Credit: Billy Hughes	
Shirley Temple's Storybook	2	20	36	02/12/1961	"Onawandah"	Daniel Winters	Credit: Billy Hughes	
Lassie	7	24	243	02/26/1961	"Cracker Jack"	Billy Joe	Credit: Billy Hughes	
Law and Mr. Jones	1	22	22	03/17/1961	"Everybody Versus Timmy Drayton"	Timmy Drayton	Credit: Billy Hughes	
87th Precinct	1	3	3	10/09/1961	"Lady Killer"	Frankie Annuci	Credit: Billy Hughes	
Wagon Train	5	4	156	10/18/1961	"The Selena Hartnell Story"	Matt	Credit: Billy Hughes	
Gunsmoke	7	9	242	11/25/1961	"Milly"	Joey Glover	Credit: Billy Hughes	
The Rifleman	4	11	121	12/18/1961	"Long Gun from Tucson"	Jeffrey Waller	Credit: Billy Hughes	
Lassie	8	15	270	12/24/1961	"Yochim's Christmas"	Billy Joe Yochim	Credit: Billy Hughes	
New Breed	1	16	16	01/16/1962	"To Sell a Human Being"	unnamed	Credit: Billy Hughes	
General Electric Theater	10	20	289	02/11/1962	"Badge of Honor"	unnamed	Credit: Billy Hughes	
Gunsmoke	7	23	256	03/10/1962	"Reprisal"	Tommy	Credit: Billy Hughes	
The Rifleman	4	28	138	04/09/1962	"Day of Reckoning"	Aaron Jamison	Credit: Billy Hughes	
General Electric Theater	10	30	299	04/29/1962	"Mister Doc"	Grover Darrow	Credit: Billy Hughes	
Dennis the Menace	3	36	106	06/17/1962	"The Club Initiation"	Walter Hooper	Credit: Billy Hughes	
Wide Country	1	8	8	11/08/1962	"A Devil in the Chute"	Jay (as a boy)	Credit: Billy Hughes	
Leave It to Beaver	6	11	206	12/06/1962	"Beaver, the Sheep Dog"	Chuck	Credit: Billy Hughes	
Gunsmoke	8	13	280	12/08/1962	"Us Haggens"	Timmy	Credit: Billy Hughes	
The Rifleman	5	16	158	01/21/1963	"The Sidewinder"	Gridley Maule, Jr.	Credit: Billy Hughes, Jr.	
Laramie	4	19	111	02/12/1963	"The Fugitives"	Adam Tolliver	Credit: Billy Hughes	
Dr. Kildare	2	20	53	02/21/1963	"A Trip to Niagara"	David Jonah	Credit: Billy Hughes	
Twilight Zone	4	15	117	04/18/1963	"The Incredible World of Horace Ford"	Kid	Credit: (uncredited)	
Our Man Higgins	1	30	30	04/24/1963	"Delinquent for a Day"	Eddie	Credit: Billy Hughes	
Wagon Train	7	9	235	11/11/1963	"The Eli Bancroft Story"	Matt	Credit: Billy Hughes	
77 Sunset Strip	6	9	195	11/15/1963	"By His Own Verdict"	Terry Nilson	Credit: Billy Hughes	
Arrest and Trial	1	6	6	10/20/1963	"A Flame in the Dark"	Steve Hockinger	Credit: Billy E. Hughes	
Wagon Train	7	22	248	02/17/1964	"The Melanie Craig Story"	Mark Basham	Credit: Billy Hughes	
Lassie	11	5	357	10/04/1964	"Climb the Mountain Slowly"	Ricky Sutton	Credit: Billy Hughes	

== Filmography ==
- Ole Rex (1961) - The runaway boy
- Posse from Hell (1961) - Jackie Hutchins (uncredited role)
- Stakeout! (1962) - Joey Dasco, Jr.
- My Six Loves (1963) - Leo
- Smoke in the Wind (1975) - Till Mondier (as Billy Hughes, Jr.)

Billy Hughes also had an uncredited stunt role in the 1969 film The Wild Bunch. He is sometimes mistakenly credited with a role in Gone with the West (1975) but this was likely a token appearance by his father Billy Hughes Sr.
