= The Incredible World of Horace Ford =

- The Twilight Zone episode
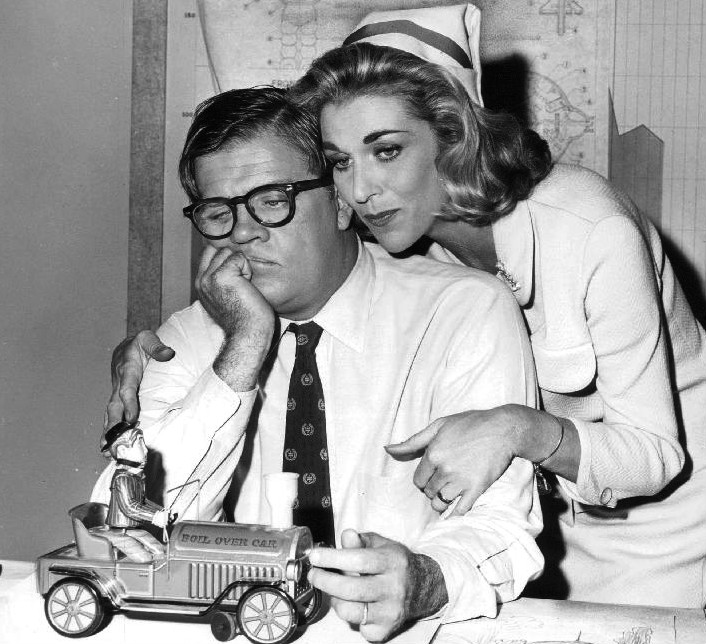
- Pat Hingle and Nan Martin as Horace and Laura Ford
- Episode no.: Season 4 Episode 15
- Directed by: Abner Biberman
- Written by: Reginald Rose
- Production code: 4854
- Original air date: April 18, 1963

Guest appearances
- Pat Hingle; Nan Martin; Ruth White; Phillip Pine; Vaughn Taylor; Jerry Davis; Billy Hughes; Mary Carver; Jim E. Titus

Episode chronology
| ← Previous "Of Late I Think of Cliffordville" | Next → "On Thursday We Leave for Home" |
- The Twilight Zone (1959 TV series) (season 4)

"The Incredible World of Horace Ford" is an episode in season four of the American television anthology series The Twilight Zone. In this episode, a toy designer fixated on his childhood days finds that he travels back to those times whenever he revisits his old neighborhood.

== Opening narration ==
Mr. Horace Ford, who has a preoccupation with another time, a time of childhood, a time of growing up, a time of street games, stickball and hide-'n-go-seek. He has a reluctance to check out a mirror and see the nature of his image: proof positive that the time he dwells in has already passed him by. But in a moment or two he'll discover that mechanical toys and memories and daydreaming and wishful thinking and all manner of odd and special events can lead one into a special province, uncharted and unmapped, a country of both shadow and substance known as the Twilight Zone.

== Plot ==
Horace Ford is a 38-year-old toy designer whose life is dominated by blissfully happy memories of his childhood. His colleagues, wife, and mother have all become increasingly frustrated with his obsession.

One day, he decides to revisit his childhood neighborhood. Ford discovers, to his amazement, that it has not changed. He recognizes the boys he played with in his childhood—who have not aged. Frightened, he returns to his apartment, but he visits his old neighborhood again on each of the next several nights. Each night the same scene plays out and he stays slightly longer, before returning to his apartment.

On his last visit, he hears his old friends complaining that he didn't invite them to his birthday party. He tries to talk to them, and suddenly turns into a boy again. His friends bully and assault him, as Horace realizes that his childhood was not as pleasant as he would nostalgically recall. After his wife finds him, he "grows up"—returning to his own time period and age group with a new-found appreciation for life as an adult.

== Closing narration ==
Exit Mr. and Mrs. Horace Ford, who have lived through a bizarre moment not to be calibrated on normal clocks or watches. Time has passed, to be sure, but it's the special time in the special place known as the Twilight Zone.

== Themes ==
This episode revisits themes used in the series in the episodes "The Trouble with Templeton" (season 2) and "Walking Distance" (season 1)—namely, a person's propensity to romanticize and try to relive a past that may not have been at all as good as they like to remember it.

== Production notes ==
Reginald Rose originally wrote "The Incredible World of Horace Ford" as a teleplay for Westinghouse Studio One, which originally aired live on June 13, 1955, starring Art Carney in the title role, with Leora Dana as Laura. The original ending was somewhat downbeat, and producer Herbert Hirschman asked Rose to create a slightly different (and happier) ending. Accordingly, the Twilight Zone version of the script is largely identical to the Studio One version, except that an epilogue has been added. In the Studio One version, the story ends at the Fords' apartment, with the audience invited to assume that Horace has been permanently transported back to his miserable past. In the Twilight Zone version, the story continues on: Laura leaves the apartment to find Horace, who magically transforms back into an adult and vows not to live in the past any longer.

== Cast ==
- Pat Hingle as Horace Maxwell Ford
- Nan Martin as Laura Ford
- Ruth White as Mrs. Ford
- Phillip Pine as Leonard O'Brien
- Vaughn Taylor as Mr. Judson
- Jerry Davis as Hermie Brandt
- Billy Hughes as Kid
- Mary Carver as Betty O'Brien
- Jim E. Titus as Horace as a boy
