= Ruth White (actress) =

American actress (1914–1969)

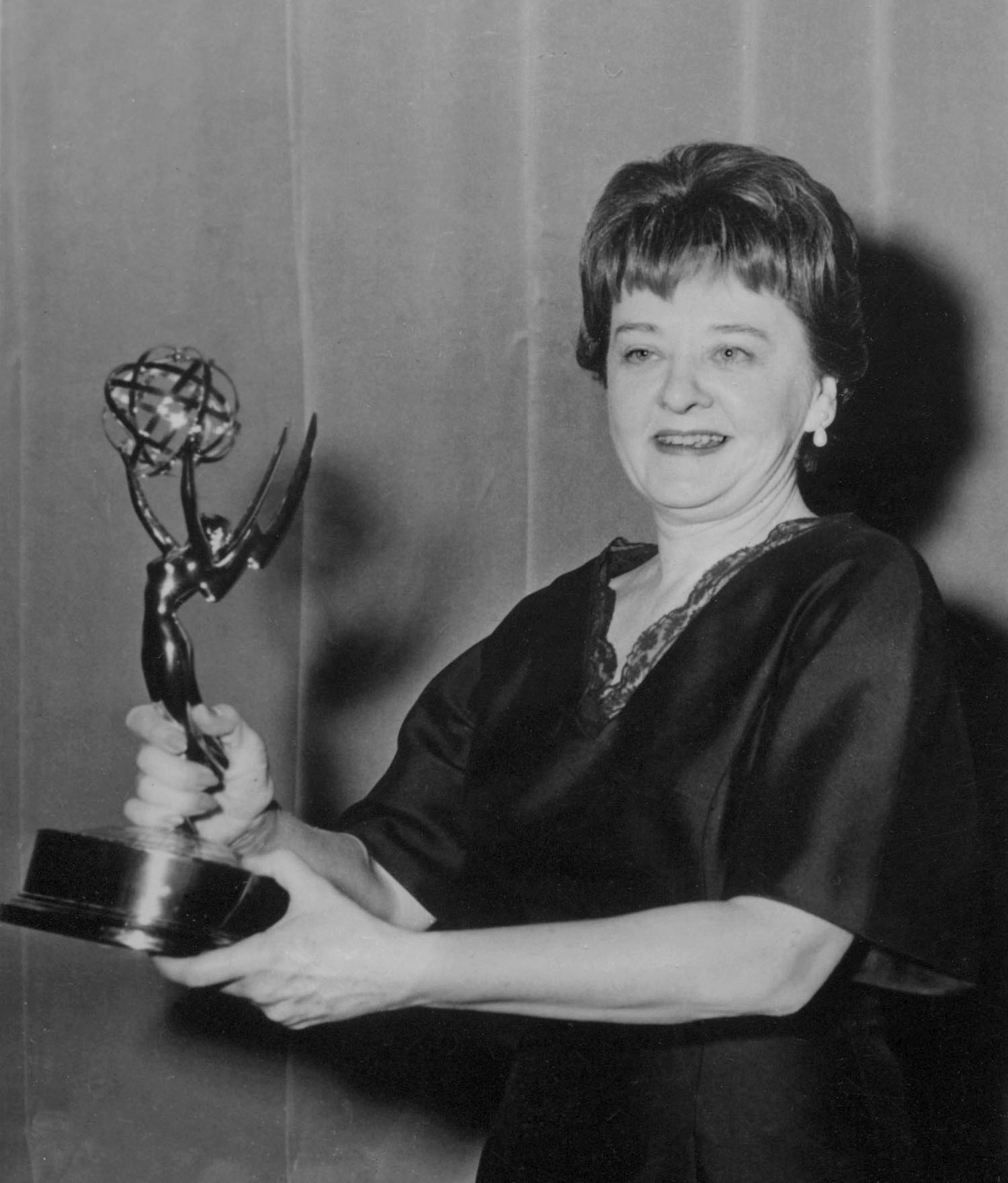
- Ruth White, having won an Emmy Award in 1964
- Born: Ruth Patricia White; April 24, 1914; Perth Amboy, New Jersey, U.S.
- Died: December 3, 1969 (aged 55); Perth Amboy, New Jersey, U.S.
- Occupation: Actress
- Years active: 1946–1969

Ruth Patricia White (April 24, 1914 – December 3, 1969) was an American actress who worked in theatre, film, and television. She won Emmy and Obie awards, and was a Tony Award nominee.

== Early years ==
A lifelong resident of Perth Amboy, New Jersey, White was of Irish Catholic descent. She attended St. Mary's High School and graduated with a bachelor's degree in literature from New Jersey College for Women, now Douglass Residential College, Rutgers University in 1935. While pursuing her acting career in nearby New York City, she taught acting and drama at Seton Hall University. During this period, she also studied acting with Maria Ouspenskaya.

== Early career ==
White began her acting career in 1940 as an apprentice at the Cape May Playhouse. Late in World War II, she spent six months in Alaska and the Aleutians touring with a USO troupe. For five years, beginning in 1948, she was the leading resident actress at Bucks County Playhouse.

White's Broadway debut came in The Ivy Green (1949).

== Career hiatus and resurgence ==
White's career was delayed in the late 1950s while she nursed her ailing mother. She appeared in off-Broadway plays of Samuel Beckett ("Happy Days") and Edward Albee ("Malcolm" and "Box"). She earned a Tony Award nomination in 1968 for her role in Harold Pinter's The Birthday Party.

Among her film appearances are her role as Mother Marcella in Fred Zinnemann's The Nun's Story (1959) and as the cantankerous, aged Mrs. Dubose, who yells at the precocious children Jem, Scout, and Dill from her front porch in Robert Mulligan's To Kill a Mockingbird (1962). By the end of the 1960s, she had become one of New York's most highly praised and in demand character actresses, and appeared in Midnight Cowboy, Hang 'Em High and No Way To Treat A Lady.

White's final film role was in The Pursuit of Happiness, released 14 months after her death.

== Recognition ==
In 1962, White won an Obie Award for Distinguished Performance by an Actress for her work in the play Happy Days.

In 1964, she won an Emmy Award for her role in the Hallmark Hall of Fame TV Movie Little Moon of Alban.

== Death ==
White, who never married, died of cancer on December 3, 1969, aged 55. She was survived by her brothers, Richard and Charles, and her sister, Mrs. Genevieve Driscoll. She was predeceased by another sister, Mary Cecile White, who served as president of the Perth Amboy Teachers Union Local 857. She is interred with her brothers Charles and Richard in the family plot at Saint Mary's Cemetery, Perth Amboy, New Jersey.

== Filmography ==
Film
Year	Title	Role	Notes
1957	Edge of the City	Katherine Nordmann	
1959	The Nun's Story	Mother Marcella (School of Medicine)	
1962	To Kill a Mockingbird	Mrs. Dubose	
1965	Baby the Rain Must Fall	Miss Clara	
1965	A Rage to Live	Mrs. Bannon	
1966	Cast a Giant Shadow	Mrs. Chaison	
1967	Up the Down Staircase	Beatrice Schacter	
1967	The Tiger Makes Out	Mrs. Kelly	
1968	No Way To Treat A Lady	Mrs. Himmel	
1968	A Lovely Way to Die	Biddy, Cook	
1968	Hang 'Em High	Madame 'Peaches' Sophie	
1968	Charly	Mrs. Apple	
1969	Midnight Cowboy	Sally Buck - Texas	
1969	The Reivers	Miss Reba	Posthumously released
1971	The Pursuit of Happiness	Mrs. Popper	Posthumously released (final film role)
Television
Year	Title	Role	Notes
1949	The Magic Cottage	Bessie Bookbinder	early DuMont children's series
1952	Captain Video and His Video Rangers	Mrs. Bullfinch	1 episode
1963	The Twilight Zone	Mrs. Ford	Episode: The Incredible World of Horace Ford
1963–1965	The Fugitive	Edith Waverly / Grams	2 episodes
1964	Little Moon of Alban	Shelagh Mangan	received Emmy award for outstanding supporting actress
