= Two People (1973 film) =

American drama film by Robert Wise

- Original poster
- Directed by: Robert Wise
- Written by: Richard De Roy
- Produced by: Robert Wise
- Starring: Peter Fonda; Lindsay Wagner; Estelle Parsons
- Cinematography: Henri Decaë
- Edited by: William Reynolds
- Music by: David Shire
- Distributed by: Universal Pictures
- Release date: March 18, 1973
- Running time: 100 minutes
- Country: United States
- Language: English

Two People is a 1973 American drama film produced and directed by Robert Wise and starring Peter Fonda and Lindsay Wagner. The screenplay by Richard De Roy focuses on the brief relationship shared by a Vietnam War deserter and a fashion model.

== Plot ==
Deirdre McCluskey is a Manhattan-based fashion model who has completed an assignment for Vogue with photographer, Ron Kesselman, who is also her lover, and Barbara Newman, an editor, in Marrakesh. Ron has announced plans to explore the Sahara Desert in lieu of returning home to his son out-of-wedlock with Deirdre, Marcus, leaving them to go to Casablanca by train, without him.

Deidre, aware her love for Ron has died, recognizes fellow passenger Evan Bonner from a cafe where she had eaten the previous day. She approaches his compartment to ask if he has any kief he'd be willing to share with her. Seeing him alone and in tears, she returns to Barbara.

When the train breaks down, Evan and Deidre explore a nearby Arab village while waiting for it to be repaired. Deirdre is attracted to Evan but he withdraws from her advances. On board a flight from Casablanca to Paris, he confesses he deserted in Vietnam, was brought to Moscow by a pro-peace group, and lived in Sweden and Morocco until, weary of his nomad existence, he decided to surrender and face court martial and a prison term.

Deirdre spends a day and night with Evan in Paris before they return to the United States. The following morning, she proposes they remain in Europe, supported by her salary, but he declines. They fly to New York City, where the two are welcomed at Deirdre's townhouse by her mother and son. Deirdre repeats her offer, but Evan is determined to put his past behind him, and later that day he surrenders to the authorities.

== Cast ==
- Peter Fonda as Evan Bonner
- Lindsay Wagner as Deirdre McCluskey
- Estelle Parsons as Barbara Newman
- Alan Fudge as Fitzgerald
- Frances Sternhagen as Mrs. McCluskey
- Geoffrey Horne as Ron Kesselman

== Production ==
Fonda said "We shot the film in sequence. It was designed by Bob. It was simply the best way to shoot the film. We rehearsed for a week and a half. You know, we spent five weeks on the Marrakesh Express. It worked out pretty well."

== Critical reception ==
Roger Greenspun of The New York Times called the film "a very silly movie" and added, "I am tempted to hang the movie with quotations from its dialogue — which would be unfair. It is really equally bad in all departments . . . Two People is remarkably of a piece — not with the consistency of a movie director like Robert Wise, but rather with the consistency of something cooked up from the same package of synthetic soup."

Roger Ebert of the Chicago Sun-Times observed, "It must have sounded like such a good story idea, all those months or years ago when they were writing the film . . . What we have here, potentially, is a sort of bittersweet, radicalized Love Story, and that must have been what sold the director, Robert Wise, on the project. The movie sounds superficially as if it might have a comment to make on the effect of the war on its warriors. Well, that may be true, but true of a movie they didn't make. What we're left with is an awfully awkward journey into banality."

TV Guide rated the film one out of four stars and commented, "Fonda and Wagner (in her film debut) just aren't able to pull it off."

== See also ==
- List of American films of 1973
