= Pat Hingle =

American actor (1924–2009)

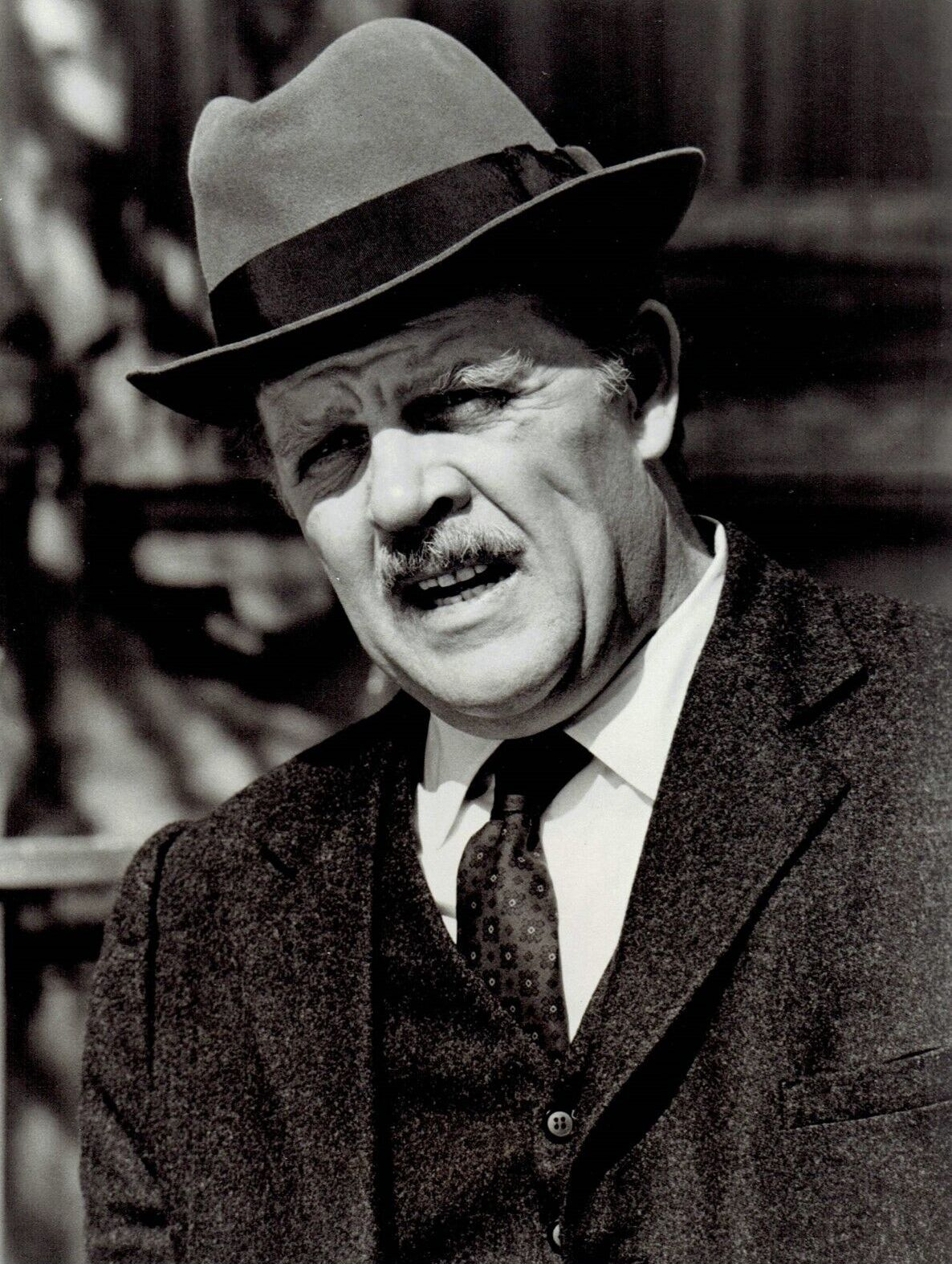
- Hingle as Dr. Sam Abelman in the 1974 ABC Movie of the Week remake of The Last Angry Man (1959)
- Born: Martin Patterson Hingle; July 19, 1924; Miami, Florida, U.S.
- Died: January 3, 2009 (aged 84); Carolina Beach, North Carolina, U.S.
- Education: University of Texas
- Occupation: Actor
- Years active: 1951–2008
- Spouses: Alyce Faye Dorsey (m. 1947; div. 1972); Julie Wright (m. 1979)
- Children: 5

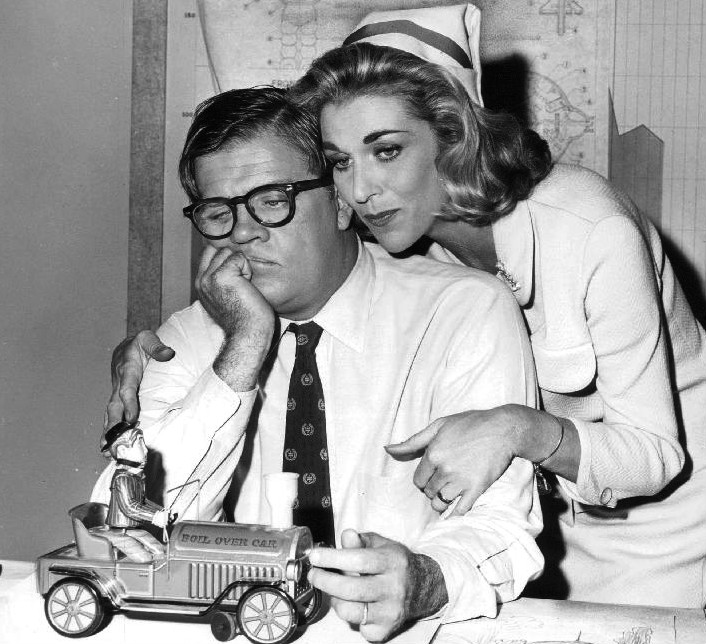
Pat Hingle and Nan Martin in "The Incredible World of Horace Ford", a 1963 episode of The Twilight Zone

Martin Patterson Hingle (July 19, 1924 – January 3, 2009) was an American actor. He was best known to screen audiences for his character roles, often as tough blue-collar authority figures, in over 200 productions between 1954 and 2008.

On stage, Hingle starred in notable Broadway productions like Cat on a Hot Tin Roof (1955), J.B. (1958), Strange Interlude (1963), and That Championship Season (1972). He was nominated for the Tony Award for Best Featured Actor in a Play for his performance in William Inge's Dark at the Top of the Stairs (1957).

Hingle was a close friend of Clint Eastwood and appeared in the Eastwood films Hang 'Em High, The Gauntlet, and Sudden Impact. He also portrayed Commissioner Gordon in the Batman film franchise from 1989 to 1997.

== Early life ==
Born in Miami, Florida, Hingle was the son of a building contractor father and a mother who "worked at menial jobs". He attended high school in Weslaco, Texas, and played tuba in the WHS band. During World War II, Hingle enlisted in the U.S. Navy in December 1941, dropping out of the University of Texas, and served on the destroyer USS Marshall. He returned to UT after the war and earned a degree in radio broadcasting in 1949. As a Navy reservist, he was recalled to the service during the Korean War and served on the escort destroyer USS Damato.

Hingle began acting in college, and after graduating, he moved to New York and studied at HB Studio and the American Theatre Wing. In 1952, he became a member of the Actors Studio. This led to his first Broadway show, End as a Man.

== Career ==
On Broadway, Hingle performed the role of Gooper in the original Broadway production of Tennessee Williams's Cat on a Hot Tin Roof (1955). He played the title role in Archibald MacLeish's award-winning Broadway play J.B. (1958), receiving rave reviews.

In February 1959, while playing J.B. on Broadway, Hingle was seriously injured in an accident. He was trapped in the elevator of his West End Avenue apartment building when it stalled between the second and third floors. The elevator stopped four feet above the landing, within reach, and Hingle tried to jump to the second floor. He missed and fell back down the elevator shaft, plunging 30 feet to the bottom. He fractured his skull, wrist, hip and most of the ribs on his left side. He broke his left leg in three places and lost the little finger on his left hand.

On the strength of his performance in J.B., Hingle had been offered the title role of the 1960 film Elmer Gantry, but he lost it to Burt Lancaster because of his injuries. His recovery took months, and at first he could not walk without a cane.

Hingle appeared in the 1963 Actors Studio production of Strange Interlude, directed by Jose Quintero, and That Championship Season (1972). He earned a Tony Award nomination for his performance in Dark at the Top of the Stairs (1957). In 1997, he played Benjamin Franklin in the Roundabout Theatre revival of the musical 1776, with Brent Spiner and Gregg Edelman.

Hingle's first film role was an uncredited part as bartender Jock in On the Waterfront (1954). Later in his career, he was known for playing judges, police officers and other authority figures. He was a guest star on the early NBC legal drama Justice, based on case histories of the Legal Aid Society of New York, which aired in the 1950s.

Another notable role was as the father of Warren Beatty's character in Splendor in the Grass (1961). Hingle was widely known for portraying the father of Sally Field's title character Norma Rae (1979). He also played manager Colonel Tom Parker in John Carpenter's TV movie Elvis (1979).

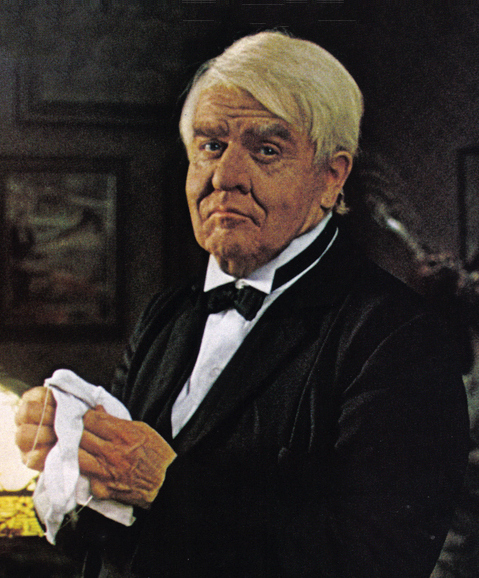
Hingle as Thomas Edison in a General Electric ad, in 1977

Hingle had a long list of television and film credits to his name dating to 1948. Among them were two episodes of The Fugitive (1964), Carol for Another Christmas (1964), Nevada Smith (1966), Mission: Impossible (1967), The Invaders (1967), Hang 'Em High (1968), The Gauntlet (1977), Sudden Impact (1983), Road To Redemption (2001), When You Comin' Back, Red Ryder? (1979), Brewster's Millions (1985), Stephen King's Maximum Overdrive (1986), Baby Boom (1987), The Grifters (1990), Citizen Cohn (1992), Cheers (1993), The Land Before Time (1988), Wings (1996), and Shaft (2000). He played Dr. Chapman in seven episodes of the TV series Gunsmoke (1971), and Col. Tucker in the movie Gunsmoke: To the Last Man (1992). In 1963, Hingle guest-starred in an episode of The Twilight Zone, "The Incredible World of Horace Ford", as the title character. He guest-starred in the TV series Matlock, In the Heat of the Night, and Murder, She Wrote. In 1980, he appeared in the short-lived police series Stone with Dennis Weaver.

Hingle played Commissioner Gordon in the 1989 film Batman and its three sequels. He is one of only two actors to appear in the four Batman films from 1989 to 1997; the other is Michael Gough.

In November 2007, he created the Pat Hingle Guest Artist Endowment to enable students to work with visiting professional actors at the University of North Carolina Wilmington.

== Personal life ==
Hingle married Alyce Faye Dorsey on June 3, 1947. They had three children. The couple later divorced. In 1979, Hingle married Julia Wright. He and his second wife had two children.

=== Death ===
Hingle died from myelodysplastic cancer (which had been diagnosed in November 2008) at the age of 84 at his house in Carolina Beach in North Carolina on 3 January 2009. He was cremated and his ashes were scattered in the Atlantic Ocean.

== Filmography ==
=== Film ===
Pat Hingle film credits
Year	Title	Role	Notes
1954	On the Waterfront	Jocko	Uncredited
1957	The Strange One	Harold Koble	
1957	No Down Payment	Herman Kreitzer	
1960	Wild River	Narrator (voice)	Uncredited
1961	Splendor in the Grass	Ace Stamper	
1963	The Ugly American	Homer Atkins	
1963	All the Way Home	Ralph Follet	
1964	Invitation to a Gunfighter	Sam Brewster	
1966	Nevada Smith	'Big Foot'	
1968	Sol Madrid	Harry Mitchell	
1968	Hang 'Em High	Judge Adam Fenton	
1968	Jigsaw	Lew Haley	
1970	Bloody Mama	Sam Adams Pendlebury	
1970	WUSA	Bingamon	
1970	Norwood	Grady Fring	
1972	The Carey Treatment	Captain Pearson	
1973	One Little Indian	Captain Stewart	
1973	Happy as the Grass Was Green	Eric Mills	
1974	The Super Cops	Inspector Novick	
1974	Nightmare Honeymoon	Mr. Binghamton	
1976	Independence	John Adams	Short film
1977	The Gauntlet	Det. Maynard Josephson	
1979	When You Comin' Back, Red Ryder?	Lyle Stricker	
1979	Norma Rae	Vernon	
1980	Running Scared	Sergeant McClain	
1983	Going Berserk	Ed Reese	
1983	Running Brave	Coach Bill Easton	
1983	Sudden Impact	Chief Lester Jannings	
1985	The Falcon and the Snowman	Charles Boyce	
1985	Brewster's Millions	Edward Roundfield	
1986	Maximum Overdrive	Bubba Hendershot	
1987	Baby Boom	Hughes Larabee	
1988	The Land Before Time	Narrator / Rooter (voice)	
1989	Batman	Commissioner Jim Gordon	
1990	The Grifters	'Bobo' Justus	
1992	Batman Returns	Commissioner Jim Gordon	
1994	Lightning Jack	U.S. Marshal Dan Kurtz	
1995	The Quick and the Dead	Horace Pinnick	
1995	Batman Forever	Commissioner Jim Gordon	
1996	Larger than Life	Vernon	
1997	Batman & Robin	Commissioner Jim Gordon	
1997	A Thousand Acres	Harold Clark	
1999	Muppets from Space	General Luft	
2000	Shaft	Judge Dennis Bradford	
2001	Road to Redemption	Grandpa Nathan Tucker	
2006	Two Tickets to Paradise	Mark's Dad	
2006	Talladega Nights: The Ballad of Ricky Bobby	Mr. Dennit Sr.	

=== Television ===
Pat Hingle television credits
Year	Title	Role	Notes
1957	Alfred Hitchcock Presents	Warren Selvy	1 episode
1962	The Defenders	Franklin Williams	Episode: "The Trial of Jenny Scott"
1962, 1963	The Untouchables	Mitchell A. Grandin / Barney	2 episodes
1963	The Twilight Zone	Horace Ford	Episode: "The Incredible World of Horace Ford"
1965	Daniel Boone	Will Carey	1 episode
1965	The Fugitive	Sheriff Joe Bob Sims	1 episode
1966	The Andy Griffith Show	Fred Gibson	1 episode
1967	Mission: Impossible	R.J. McMillan	1 episode
1967	The Invaders	Brother Avery	1 episode
1969	Bonanza	Sheriff Austin	Episode: "The Silence at Stillwater"
1971	Gunsmoke	Dr. John Chapman	Recurring role, 6 episodes
1973	Kung Fu	General Thoms	1 episode
1974	The Six Million Dollar Man	Senator Hill	1 episode
1975-77	Hawaii Five-O	Ormsbee	3 episodes
1980	M*A*S*H	Colonel Daniel Webster Tucker	1 episode
1980	Stone	Chief Gene Paulton	Main role, 10 episodes
1984	Magnum, P.I.	Garwood Huddle	1 episode
1985	Amazing Stories	The Sheriff	1 episode
1986	Matlock	Tom McCabe	Episode: "Santa Claus"
1986-91	Murder, She Wrote	Ret. Lt. Det. Barney Kale, Lt. James Ignatius O'Malley, Capt. Zach Franklin	3 episodes
1989	The Equalizer	Waldo Jarrell	Episode: "Prisoners of Conscience"
1993	Cheers	Gus O'Malley	1 episode
1993–94	In the Heat of the Night	Daddy Roy Eversole	2 episodes
1996	Wings	Jack Hackett	1 episode
1998	Homicide: Life on the Street	Wally Flynn	Episode: "Red, Red Wine"
1999	Touched by an Angel	Ben Mangione	Episode: "Family Business"

==== TV films and television ====
Pat Hingle television credits
Year	Title	Role	Notes
1964	Carol for Another Christmas	Ghost of Christmas Present	
1974	The Last Angry Man	Dr. Sam Abelman	
1977	Tarantulas: The Deadly Cargo	'Doc' Hodgins	
1979	Elvis	Colonel Tom Parker	
1985	The Lady from Yesterday	Jim Bartlett	
1985	The Rape of Richard Beck	'Chappy' Beck	
1988	War and Remembrance	Admiral William "Bull" Halsey	
1990	The Kennedys of Massachusetts	PJ Kennedy	
1992	Gunsmoke: To the Last Man	Col. Tucker	
1992	Citizen Cohn	J. Edgar Hoover	
1996	Bastard out of Carolina	Mr. Waddell	
1997	The Shining	Pete Watson	

== Awards and nominations ==
Pat Hingle television credits
Institution	Year	Category	Work	Result	Ref.
Tony Awards	1958	Best Featured Actor in a Play	The Dark at the Top of the Stairs	nom	
