= Love Thy Neighbor (1984 film) =

- Genre: Comedy
- Written by: Chris Conrad
- Directed by: Tony Bill
- Starring: John Ritter; Penny Marshall; Cassie Yates; Bert Convy
- Music by: Georges Delerue
- Country of origin: United States
- Original language: English

Production
- Executive producer: Patricia Nardo
- Producer: Renée Valente
- Cinematography: Roland 'Ozzie' Smith
- Editor: Sidney Katz
- Running time: 100 minutes
- Production company: 20th Century Fox Television

Original release
- Network: ABC
- Release: May 23, 1984

Love Thy Neighbor is a 1984 American made-for-television romantic comedy film starring John Ritter, Penny Marshall, Cassie Yates, Bert Convy and Constance McCashin. It originally premiered as an "ABC Movie Special" on May 23, 1984.

== Plot ==
Danny Loeb (John Ritter) and Linda Wilson (Penny Marshall) are suburban neighbors who abhor each other. One day, their respective spouses, Sally (Constance McCashin) and Mike (Bert Convy), fall in love and run away together, leaving Danny and Linda alone to care for their children.

The former enemies, picking up the pieces of their lives, decide to overcome their various differences and take comfort in one another—and soon find themselves falling in love.

== Cast ==
- John Ritter as Danny Loeb
- Penny Marshall as Linda Wilson
- Cassie Yates as Judy Lister
- Bert Convy as Mike Wilson
- Constance McCashin as Sally Loeb
- Roger Perry as George Pappas
- Thomas Byrd as Wayne Nelson
- Seth Wagerman as Mark Loeb
- Lukas Haas as Bobby Loeb
- Bobby Jacoby as Brian Wilson
- Jerry Supiran as Joey Wilson
- Barbara Crampton as Carol
