= Against All Odds (TV series) =

- Genre: Reality
- Presented by: Lindsay Wagner; Everett McGill
- Country of origin: United States
- No. of episodes: 4

Production
- Executive producers: John Cosgrove; Terry Dunn Meurer
- Running time: 30 minutes

Original release
- Network: NBC
- Release: April 19 – May 10, 1992

Against All Odds is an NBC reality series hosted by Lindsay Wagner and Everett McGill. Using interviews, video footage and re-creations, the series showcased people and animals who overcame enormous odds to survive in life-threatening situations or rescued others at great risk to their own lives.

The series premiered in April 1992 and broadcast four episodes (the first two back-to-back), but was not picked up as a permanent part of the NBC schedule. The series was produced at a time when American television networks were increasing their reality programming, but is noted for the universal negative reviews that it received.

In 2016, a pilot of the UK version of Against All Odds was made and starred Manchester model Roxanne Mitchell.

== Cast and characters ==
- Lindsay Wagner...Host
- Everett McGill...Host

== Critical reception ==
While many newspapers simply noted the premiere of the series as part of the flood of reality series appearing on network programming (for example David Zurawik of The Baltimore Sun), most other columnists gave the show very negative reviews. Jonathan Storm of The Inquirer said "Hosting this sorry "reality" show, Lindsay Wagner and Everett McGill struggle against all odds to maintain their self-respect. She must have severe financial problems." Rick Kogan of the Chicago Tribune noted that "If this is NBC's idea of a viable competitor to CBS' 60 Minutes, it's final proof that the network's executives have gone completely off their rockers." Tom Shales of The Washington Post said "Increasingly, the "NB" in NBC has come to stand for No-Brainer. Tomorrow the network outstoops itself with the premiere of Against All Odds, a trashoid tattler about people who narrowly or not so narrowly escaped death or injury. The series itself qualifies as an accident waiting to stop happening, especially since it airs opposite 60 Minutes."
