= Love on the Run (1985 film) =

- Genre: Drama
- Written by: Sue Grafton; Steve Humphrey
- Directed by: Gus Trikonis
- Starring: Stephanie Zimbalist; Alec Baldwin; Constance McCashin
- Music by: Billy Goldenberg
- Country of origin: United States
- Original language: English

Production
- Executive producers: Sue Grafton; Steven Humphrey
- Producer: Jay Benson
- Production location: Columbus, Ohio
- Cinematography: Philip H. Lathrop
- Editor: Fred A. Chulack
- Running time: 120 minutes
- Production company: Universal Television

Original release
- Network: NBC
- Release: October 21, 1985

Love on the Run is a 1985 television film starring Alec Baldwin and Stephanie Zimbalist. A criminal lawyer goes on the run with her escaped convict lover.

== Plot ==
Diana Rockland, an inhibited and reclusive attorney whom is berated for the lack of momentum and enthusiasm in her life by her father and sister, has been assigned to represent a convict, Sean Carpenter, who has killed a fellow inmate during a prison brawl, supposedly in self-defence. As she counsels Sean, an attraction that leads to a secret romance ensues, which leads to Diana eventually helping Sean escape the prison.

== Cast ==
- Stephanie Zimbalist as Diana Rockland
- Alec Baldwin as Sean Carpenter
- Constance McCashin as Elizabeth Nellison
- Howard Duff as Lionel Rockland
- Madison Mason as Roy Nellison
- Ernie Hudson as Lamar
- Francine Lembi as Bonnie
- Kit Le Fever as Cherry
- Matthew Cowles as Yancy
- Arnold F. Turner as Rick Wade
- David Hayward as Gary Synder
- Ken Lerner as Aaron
- Savannah Smith Boucher as Martha
- Burke Byrnes as Melvin Small
- Beau Starr as Lt. Sturges
