= Jessie (1984 TV series) =

American television series

- Genre: Police drama
- Starring: Lindsay Wagner
- Composer: John Cacavas
- Country of origin: United States
- Original language: English
- No. of seasons: 1
- No. of episodes: 11 (4 unaired)

Production
- Running time: 60 minutes
- Production companies: Lindsay Wagner-David Gerber Productions; MGM/UA Television

Original release
- Network: ABC
- Release: September 18 – November 13, 1984

Jessie is an American 1984 ABC television police drama series starring Lindsay Wagner as a psychiatrist. It originated as a 1984 television movie. The series was based in part on the book "Psychologist with a Gun".

== Summary ==
The 2 hour ABC pilot of Jessie was originally set in Tucson, Arizona. The television series revolved around the criminal investigations of psychiatrist Dr. Jessie Hayden and her sometimes unorthodox work and tactics within a California police department.

== Cast ==
- Lindsay Wagner as Dr. Jessie Hayden
- Tony Lo Bianco as Lt. Alex Ascoli
- Celeste Holm as Molly Hayden
- Tom Nolan as Officer Hubbell
- Renee Jones as Ellie
- James David Hinton as Phil
- William Lucking as Sgt. Mac McClellan
- Peter Isacksen as Office Floyd Comstock

== Episodes ==
No.	Title	Directed by	Written by	Original release date
1	"Pilot"	Richard Michaels	Eric Bercovici	September 18, 1984
2	"Pilot"	Richard Michaels	Eric Bercovici	September 18, 1984
Jessie's assignment: help identify the suspect in a series of grisly murders. Guest stars: Harding: David Marshall Grant. Mary: Lupe Ontiveros.
3	"Lady Killer"	Corey Allen	Hindi Brooks	September 25, 1984
Jessie tries to convince a battered wife (Julie Carmen) that she should press charges against her husband. Meanwhile, Alex is frustrated by a box-office bandit. Guest star: The Streak: James Read.
4	"Flesh Wounds"	Don Medford	Shel Willens	October 9, 1984
Jessie and Ascoli clash over an officer who's burned out from working undercover; and Internal Affairs wants the woman fired after the publication of nude photos that were taken years ago. Guest stars: Kit: Jamie Rose. Nick Morgan: Wings Hauser.
5	"The Long Fuse"	Don Medford	Allan Cole & Chris Bunch	October 16, 1984
A series of bombings bears the mark of a radical group active in the '60s that comprises Jessie's college acquaintances. Guest stars: Prestwick: Peter Marshall. Gloria: Kitty Winn.
6	"McLaughlin's Flame"	James Sheldon	Sy Salkowitz	October 23, 1984
Jessie encourages an officer severely burned in a fire to return to duty, but must discourage his wife from treating him like an invalid.
7	"King of the Streets"	Joel Oliansky	Anthony R. Basta	October 30, 1984
Ascoli and Jessie try to get a tough 30-year veteran (Harry Guardino) off the streets and into a less stressful job. Guest stars: Snowden: Ted Gehring. Sheila: Lenore Kasdorf.
8	"In the Line of Duty"	William Wiard	T : Anthony & Nancy Lawrence; S/T : Paul Savage	November 13, 1984
Cantwell, an innocent man, is framed by police officer Ben Grant who uses him as a tool to get a departmental promotion, The wronged man manages to get out on parole to seek revenge on Ben and his partner.
9	"Psychic Connection"	Corey Allen	Paul B. Margolis	June 15, 1985
The police department resorts to the use of psychics to help catch a serial killer. The main suspect is the nephew of one of the detectives working on the case.
10	"Valerie's Turn"	Barry Crane	S : Dr. Martin Reiser; S/T : Sara Davidson	June 15, 1985
Believing that female recruits at the police academy face unfair disadvantages, Jessie counsels a group of women to help them overcome those disadvantages. In a side plot, Jessie hopes to rekindle an old romance when an old flame comes to visit.
11	"Trick of Fate"	Ray Austin	A.M. Adminima	June 15, 1985
Jessie tries to protect a teen-age prostitute who witnessed the murder of a toy-company executive. Guest stars: April: Jonna Lee. Hodge: Joel Bailey. Paige: Liam Sullivan.
12	"Ties That Kill"	Unknown	Unknown	June 15, 1985
After losing her policeman-husband, a woman turns to Lt. Ascoli for comfort, and Jessie learns a frightening secret withheld for many years by the dead man's former partner.
