= The Runaways (TV series) =

- Genre: Drama
- Created by: William Robert Yates
- Starring: Michael Biehn; Alan Feinstein; Patti Cohoon-Friedman; James Callahan; Karen Machon; Robert Reed
- Theme music composer: Richard Markowitz
- Composer: Ralph Kessler
- Country of origin: United States
- Original language: English
- No. of seasons: 2
- No. of episodes: 18

Production
- Executive producers: William Robert Yates; Quinn Martin
- Producer: Mark Rodgers
- Running time: 42 minutes
- Production company: Quinn Martin Productions

Original release
- Network: NBC
- Release: April 27, 1978 – September 4, 1979

The Runaways is an American drama television series. The series stars Michael Biehn, Alan Feinstein, Patti Cohoon-Friedman, James Callahan, Karen Machon and Robert Reed. The series aired from April 27, 1978, to September 4, 1979, on NBC.

== Synopsis ==
A team headed by a psychologist looks for runaway teens in order to help them.

== Cast ==
- Michael Biehn as Mark Johnson
- Alan Feinstein as Steve Arizzio
- Patti Cohoon-Friedman as Debbie Shaw
- James Callahan as Sergeant Hal Grady
- Karen Machon as Karen Wingate
- Robert Reed as David McKay
- Ruth Cox as Susan Donovan
- Wayne Coy as Runaway Boy (pilot)

== Episodes ==
=== Series overview ===
Season	Episodes	Originally released	
Season	Episodes	First released	Last released
1	4	April 27, 1978	May 18, 1978
2	13	May 29, 1979	September 4, 1979

=== Season 1 (1978) ===
No. overall	No. in season	Title	Directed by	Written by	Original release date
1	1	"No Prince for My Cinderella"	William Wiard	William Robert Yates	April 27, 1978
2	2	"No Prince for My Cinderella"	William Wiard	William Robert Yates	April 27, 1978
3	3	"Melinda and the Pinball Wizard"	Unknown	Unknown	May 4, 1978
4	4	"Lies We Live With"	Unknown	Unknown	May 11, 1978
5	5	"Too Young to Love"	Unknown	Unknown	May 18, 1978

=== Season 2 (1979) ===
No. overall	No. in season	Title	Directed by	Written by	Original release date
6	1	"Dark Side of the Road"	Unknown	Unknown	May 29, 1979
7	2	"Wrong Way Street"	Unknown	Unknown	June 5, 1979
8	3	"Land of Honey"	Unknown	Unknown	June 12, 1979
9	4	"Screams in the Night"	Unknown	Unknown	June 19, 1979
10	5	"Dreams of My Father"	Unknown	Unknown	June 26, 1979
11	6	"The Breaking Point"	Unknown	Unknown	July 3, 1979
12	7	"Throwaway Child"	Michael Preece	D.C. Fontana	July 10, 1979
13	8	"The Reunion"	Kenneth C. Gilbert	Mark Rodgers	July 24, 1979
14	9	"They'll Never Forgive Me"	Unknown	Unknown	July 24, 1979
15	10	"Street of Terror: Part 1"	Unknown	Unknown	August 7, 1979
16	11	"Street of Terror: Part 2"	Unknown	Unknown	August 14, 1979
17	12	"False Images"	Unknown	Unknown	August 21, 1979
18	13	"48 Hours to Live"	Unknown	Unknown	September 4, 1979
