= Lindsay Wagner =

American actress (born 1949)

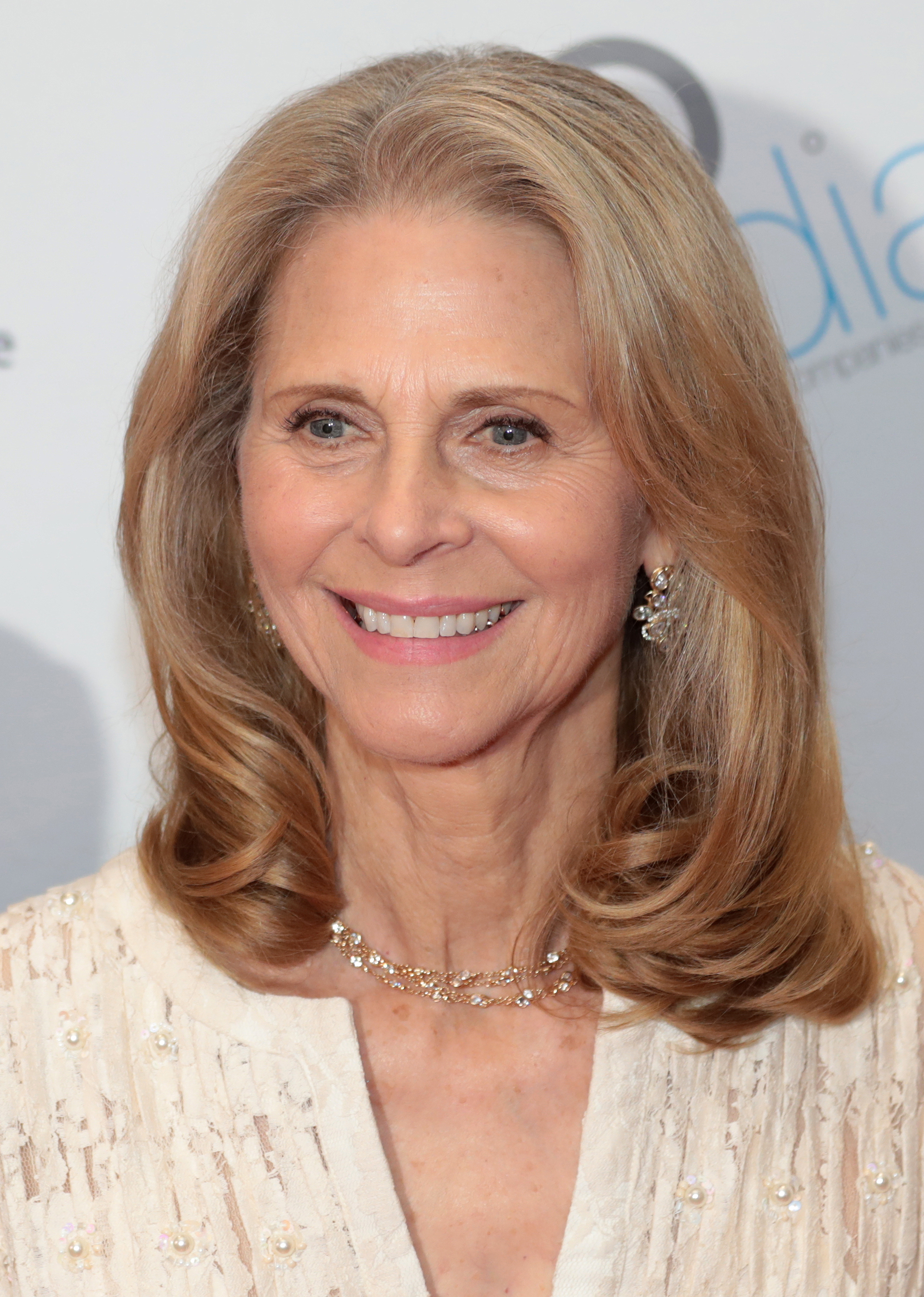
- Wagner in 2019
- Born: June 22, 1949 (age 77); Los Angeles, California, U.S.
- Education: David Douglas High School
- Alma mater: University of Oregon; Mt. Hood Community College
- Occupation: Actress
- Years active: 1969–present
- Known for: Jaime Sommers – The Bionic Woman; The Six Million Dollar Man; The Paper Chase; Scruples; The Return of the Six Million Dollar Man and the Bionic Woman
- Spouses: Allan Rider (m. 1971; div. 1973) Michael Brandon (m. 1976; div. 1979) Henry Kingi (m. 1981; div. 1984) Lawrence Mortorff (m. 1990; div. 1993)
- Children: 2
- Awards: Hollywood Walk of Fame; Primetime Emmy Awards

Lindsay Jean Wagner (born June 22, 1949) is an American actress. Wagner is popular for her leading role in the American science fiction television series The Bionic Woman (1976–1978), in which she portrayed character Jaime Sommers. She first played the role on the series The Six Million Dollar Man. The character became a pop culture icon of the 1970s. For this role, Wagner won an Emmy Award for Outstanding Lead Actress in a Dramatic Role in 1977 – the first for an actor or actress in a science fiction series. Wagner began acting professionally in 1971 and has maintained a lengthy acting career in a variety of film and television productions to the present day.

== Early life ==
Wagner was born in Los Angeles, California. Following her parents' divorce, her mother remarried, and the family moved to Portland, Oregon where Wagner graduated from Portland's David Douglas High School.

After graduation, Wagner spent a couple of months in France before enrolling at the University of Oregon for one year. Wagner then transferred to Mt. Hood Community College, Gresham, for six months before dropping out and moving to Los Angeles. She was diagnosed with dyslexia.

== Career ==
Wagner worked as a model in Los Angeles and gained some television experience by appearing as a hostess in Playboy After Dark, and she was also a contestant on the game show The Dating Game in 1969 (one of her potential suitors, whom she did not choose, was TV actor Roger Ewing). In 1971, she signed a contract with Universal Studios and worked as a contract player in Universal productions. Her primetime network television debut was in the series Adam-12 ("Million Dollar Buff"), and she went on to appear in a dozen other Universal shows, including Owen Marshall: Counselor at Law (co-starring Lee Majors), The F.B.I., Sarge, and Night Gallery.

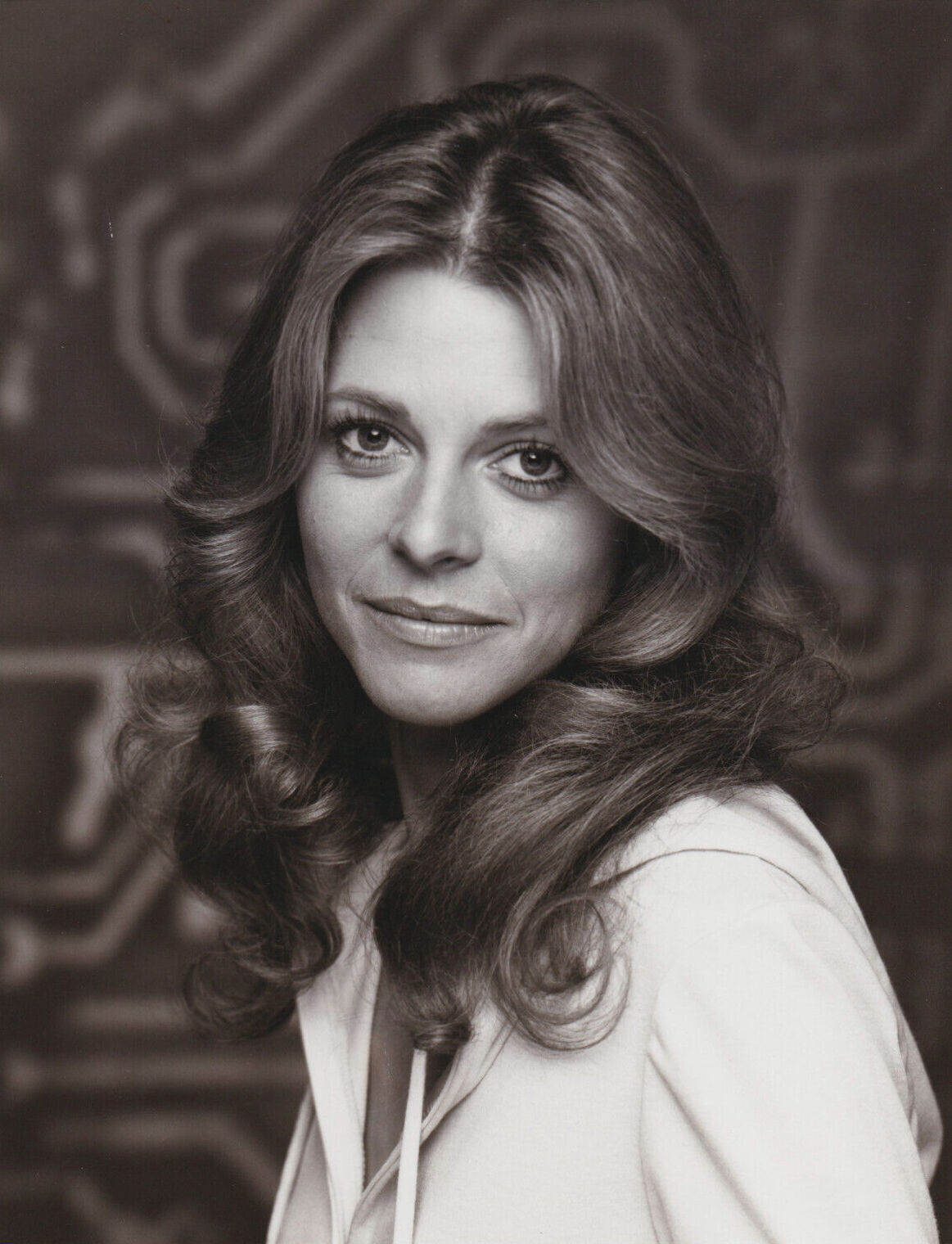
Wagner from the television series, The Bionic Woman in 1977

Between 1971 and 1975, she appeared in five episodes of Universal's Marcus Welby, M.D. and the 1974 pilot episode of The Rockford Files. In 1973, Wagner branched into film roles when Universal cast her in Two People, which was her first feature film and her first lead role. She also co-starred in the 20th Century Fox film The Paper Chase the same year, playing the daughter of the stern law professor, Kingsfield.

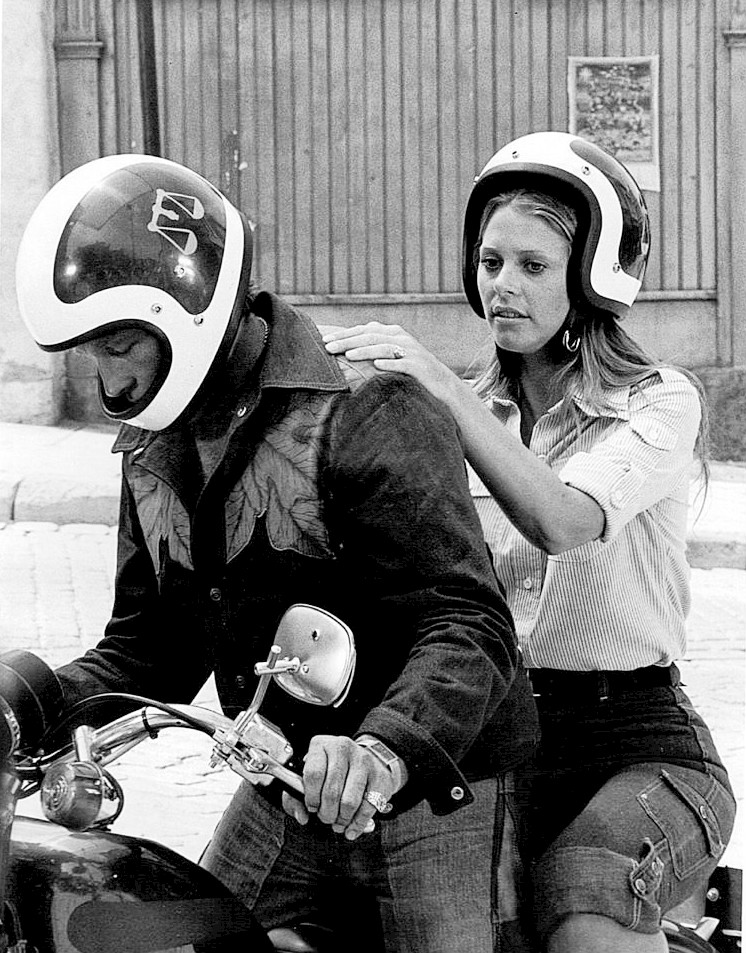
Wagner with guest star Evel Knievel. Photo from The Bionic Woman TV show, October 1977

In 1975, arranged under her extended contract with Universal Studios, Wagner played the role of Jaime Sommers, a former tennis professional who was the childhood sweetheart of "Six Million Dollar Man" Colonel Steve Austin (played by Lee Majors). According to Kenneth Johnson, interviewed for a featurette included in the 2010 North American DVD release of The Bionic Woman season one, Wagner was cast in the role based upon her appeal and spontaneity after he saw her appearance in the pilot and a follow-up episode of The Rockford Files. In the second-season, two-part episode, her character is critically injured in a skydiving accident and equipped with bionic implants similar to Austin's, but her body rejects them, ultimately leading to her death.

This was intended to be Wagner's last role under her Universal contract, but public response to the character was so overwhelming that the "death" was retconned into a cover story for a near-death secret recovery, and Wagner appeared in a two-part episode which returned her character, followed by a spin-off series, The Bionic Woman, which debuted in January 1976. The same year, she co-starred in a Canadian film, Second Wind opposite James Naughton. She made several crossover appearances in The Six Million Dollar Man during the series' run. The role earned Wagner an Emmy Award for Best Actress in a Dramatic Role in 1977.

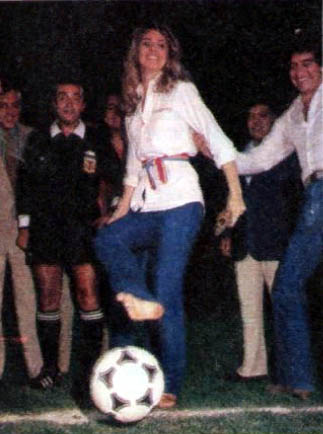
Wagner kicking off in a soccer match in Argentina, February 1982

Following the cancellation of The Bionic Woman in 1978, Wagner continued to act, predominantly in television miniseries and television films. These included the highly rated 1980 miniseries Scruples, as well as three made-for-TV Bionic reunion movies with Lee Majors between 1987 and 1994. Also in the 1980s, Wagner co-starred as Sylvester Stallone's ex-wife in his 1981 movie Nighthawks and starred in two more weekly television series, Jessie (1984) and A Peaceable Kingdom (1989), though both were cancelled with neither completing their first season. In 1983, she also appeared in an episode of Lee Majors' series The Fall Guy.

Wagner continued to act into the 1990s and 2000s, though in less prominent roles, such as a small part in the action movie Ricochet (1991). Her most recent projects have included the 2005 television film Thicker than Water with Melissa Gilbert, Buckaroo: The Movie (2005), and Four Extraordinary Women (2006). In 2010, Wagner began a recurring role as Dr. Vanessa Calder in the SyFy channel's hit drama Warehouse 13 and played the character again in its Syfy sister show Alphas in 2011. In the fall semester of 2013, Wagner began teaching at San Bernardino Valley College in southern California (Acting and Directing for Television and Film, Motion Picture Production) as an adjunct faculty member. In 2015, Wagner appeared in the NCIS season 13, episode 10: "Blood Brothers" in the role of Barbara Bishop, the mother of NCIS Probationary Agent Eleanor Bishop (Emily Wickersham).

She appeared in Grey's Anatomy as Alex Karev's mother, Helen Karev, over the course of two seasons, first appearing in 2018 during Season 14 for a single episode and reappearing in 2019 for a number of episodes during Season 15.

In June 2018, it was announced that Wagner would co-star in Death Stranding, a video game being developed by Sony Interactive Entertainment and Kojima Productions. Wagner lent her likeness to the characters Bridget and Amelie Strand and voiced the former, with Emily O'Brien voicing the latter and a younger version of the former. Death Stranding was Wagner's first role in a video game, and her first experience with the industry's motion capture and voice acting technology.

In 2021, Wagner starred in the holiday romance film Christmas at the Ranch with Amanda Righetti, Laur Allen, Archie Kao and Dia Frampton playing the character Meemaw.

=== Other work ===
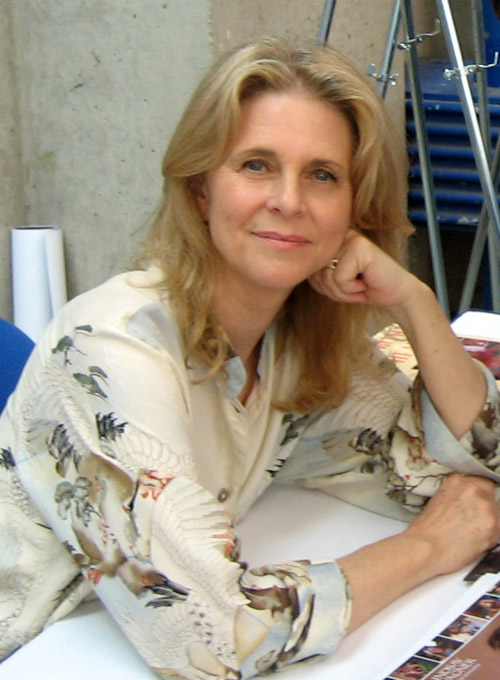
Wagner at San Diego Comic-Con 2008

In 1987, Wagner wrote a series of books with Robert M. Klein about using acupressure to achieve results akin to a surgical facelift. In 1994, she co-authored the vegetarian cookbook, High Road to Health.

Wagner appeared in commercials as a spokesperson for Southern California's regional Ford Motor Company dealerships from 1987 through 2000. She was also a spokesperson in infomercials for Select Comfort's "Sleep Number" bed from 2003 to 2009.

In recent years, Wagner has given seminars and workshops for her self-help therapy, "Quiet the Mind and Open the Heart," which promotes spirituality and meditation.

In 2010, she participated in interviews and featurettes included in the long-delayed North American DVD releases of The Bionic Woman and the 2011 release of The Six Million Dollar Man.

In 2016, Wagner publicly advocated as a treatment for her chronic urticaria (i.e., hives) Miracle Mineral Solution (MMS), a substance which the US Food and Drug Administration (FDA) declared was a toxic industrial bleach used in wastewater treatment and hydraulic fracturing.

=== Honors ===
Wagner earned an Emmy Award in 1977 for Outstanding Lead Actress in a Dramatic Role for her role in The Bionic Woman.

On December 13, 1984, the Hollywood Chamber of Commerce presented Wagner with a star on the Hollywood Walk of Fame, category 'Film', located at the north side of the 6700 block of Hollywood Boulevard.

In 2012, a Golden Palm Star on the Palm Springs, California, Walk of Stars was dedicated to Wagner.

On October 18, 2019, the San Diego International Film Festival presented Wagner with the Humanitarian Award. Previous winners include, Geena Davis, Mariel Hemingway and Joaquin Phoenix.

== Personal life ==
During the first year of The Bionic Woman, Wagner was the driver in a car accident with her then boyfriend, actor Michael Brandon, in the passenger seat. Brandon suffered a serious eye injury and Wagner received a severe cut on her upper lip which left a small but permanent scar. The event halted production on the show for weeks.

Prior to her first marriage, Wagner lived with Captain Daniel M. Yoder (USAF) until he went to Vietnam. She has been married and divorced four times. From 1971 to 1973, she was married to music publisher Allan Rider. From 1976 to 1979, she was married to Michael Brandon. In 1981, she married stuntman Henry Kingi, whom she met on the set of The Bionic Woman. Wagner had two sons with Kingi, Dorian (b. 1982) and Alex (b. 1986). The couple divorced in 1984. Wagner married TV producer Lawrence Mortorff in 1990 and they divorced three years later.

Wagner was scheduled to be a passenger on American Airlines Flight 191 from Chicago to Los Angeles on May 25, 1979, but suddenly felt very ill while waiting for the plane. She skipped the flight, which crashed only minutes after takeoff, killing all 271 people on board and 2 people on the ground – the deadliest non terrorism-related aviation accident (Note: The fatalities of the September 11 attacks are terrorism, not accidents.) to have occurred in the United States.

In the early 1980s, Wagner owned a home in the Hollywood Hills, next door to Edward Van Halen and Valerie Bertinelli. After Van Halen constructed his 5150 studio behind his own house, Wagner began to complain about the loudness of his band's recording their 1984 album. Wagner eventually moved out and Van Halen purchased the house.

Wagner was a vegetarian for fifteen years and in 1990 co-authored The High Road to Health: A Vegetarian Cookbook which was released in a paperback version in 1994. She avoids dairy products and prefers soy milk. In 1999, Wagner returned to eating meat and added fish and poultry to her diet. She is an advocate of clean eating and locally grown food.

== Filmography ==
=== Film ===
Year	Title	Role	Notes
1973	Two People	Deirdre McCluskey	
1973	The Paper Chase	Susan Fields	
1976	Second Wind	Linda	
1979	The Incredible Journey of Doctor Meg Laurel	Meg Laurel	
1979	The Two Worlds of Jennie Logan	Jennie Logan	
1981	Nighthawks	Irene DaSilva	
1981	High Risk	Olivia	
1985	Martin's Day	Dr. Mennen	
1986	Young Again	Laura Gordon	
1991	Ricochet	District Attorney Priscilla Brimleigh	
1998	Frog and Wombat	Sydney Parker	
2003	A Light in the Forest	Penelope Audrey	
2005	Buckaroo: The Movie	Ms. Ainsley	
2006	The Surfer King	Connie Zirpollo	
2008	Billy: The Early Years	Morrow Graham	
2012	Who Killed Soul Glow?	Unknown	
2018	Samson	Zealphonis	
2019	Christmas on the Range	Lillian McCree	
2021	Christmas at the Ranch	MeeMaw	
2022	When Jack Came Back	Nancy	
TBA	Pellett	Gretchen	

=== Television ===
Year	Title	Role	Notes
1971	Adam-12	Jenny Carson	Episode: "Million Dollar Buff"
1971	The Man and the City	Margie Holland	Episode: "Disaster on Turner Street"
1971	The Bold Ones: The Lawyers	Stella Bowers	Episode: "In Defense of Ellen McKay"
1971	Sarge	Laurie Meyers	Episode: "The Combatants"
1971	Owen Marshall, Counselor at Law	Diana Oliver	Episode: "Until Proven Innocent"
1971–1972	Night Gallery	Girl/Nurse	2 Episodes
1971–1975	Marcus Welby, M.D.	Susan Davis/Denise Malory/Emily Matocsis/Nurse Gledhill	5 episodes
1972	O'Hara, U.S. Treasury	Edie Lang	Episode: "Operation: XW-1"
1972	The F.B.I.	Laurie Peale	Episode: "Dark Journey"
1974–1975	The Rockford Files	Sara Butler	2 Episodes
1975–1976	The Six Million Dollar Man	Jaime Sommers	9 episodes
1976	Whodunnit?	Panellist	Episode: "Future Imperfect"
1976–1978	The Bionic Woman	Jaime Sommers	3 seasons; 58 episodes
1978	Windows, Doors & Keyholes	Unnamed	Television film
1979	The Incredible Journey of Doctor Meg Laurel	Meg Laurel	Television film
1979	The Two Worlds of Jennie Logan	Jennie Logan	Television film
1980	Scruples	Billy Ikehorn	Television miniseries, 3 episodes
1981	Callie & Son	Callie Bordeaux	Television film
1982	Memories Never Die	Joanne Tilford	Television film
1983	I Want to Live!	Barbara Graham	Television film
1983	The Fall Guy	Mary Connors	Episode: "Devil's Island"
1983	Princess Daisy	Francesca Valenski	Television film
1983	Two Kinds of Love	Susan Farley	Television film
1984	Passions	Nina Simon	Television film
1984	Jessie	Dr. Jessie Hayden & Executive producer	Television film 2 hour pilot and 12 episodes in a series
1985	The Other Lover	Claire Fielding	Television film
1985	This Child Is Mine	Bonnie Wilkerson	Television film
1986	A Child's Cry	Joanne Van Buren	Television film
1986	Kate & Allie	Julia	Episode: "Late Bloomer"
1986	Convicted	Martha Forbes	Television film
1987	Stranger in My Bed	Beverly Slater	Television film
1987	The Return of the Six Million Dollar Man and the Bionic Woman	Jaime Sommers	Television film
1987	Student Exchange	Principal	Television film
1988	Evil in Clear River	Kate McKinnon	Television film
1988	Alfred Hitchcock Presents	Susan Forrester	Episode: "Prism"
1988	The Taking of Flight 847: The Uli Derickson Story	Uli Derickson	Television film
1988	Nightmare at Bittercreek	Nita Daniels	Television film
1988	Scandals	Host	Television film
1988	Police Story: Burnout	Detective Sidney Shannon	Television film
1989	From the Dead of the Night	Joanna	Television film
1989	Voice of the Heart	Katharine Tempest	Television miniseries, 4 episodes
1989	Bionic Showdown: The Six Million Dollar Man and the Bionic Woman	Jaime Sommers	Television film
1989	A Peaceable Kingdom	Rebecca Cafferty	12 episodes
1990	Shattered Dreams	Charlotte Fedders & Co-Producer	Television film
1990	Babies	Yvonne	Television film
1991	Fire in the Dark	Janet	Television film
1991	To Be the Best	Paula O'Neill	Television miniseries, 2 episodes
1992	She Woke Up	Claudia Parr	Television film
1992	Treacherous Crossing	Lindsey Thompson Gates	Television film
1992	Against All Odds	Host	Television film
1992	A Message from Holly	Holly	Television film
1993	Nurses on the Line: The Crash of Flight 7	Elizabeth Hahn	Television film
1994	Men Who Hate Women & The Women Who Love Them	Host	Television film
1994	Once in a Lifetime	Daphne Fields	Television film
1994	Bionic Ever After?	Jaime Sommers	Television film
1995	Fighting for My Daughter	Kate Kerner	Television film
1996	Sins of Silence	Molly McKinley	Television film
1996	A Mother's Instinct	Raeanne Gilbaine	Television film
1997	Contagious	Dr. Hannah Cole	Television film
1997	Their Second Chance	Barbara	Television film
1998	Voyage of Terror	Dr. Stephanie Tauber	Television film
2002	The Division	Agatha B.	Episode: "Farewell My Lovelies"
2005	Thicker than Water	Jess Jarrett	Television film
2006	Four Extraordinary Women	Anne	Television film
2006	The Surfer King	Connie Zirpollo	Television film
2008	Billy: The Early Years	Morrow Graham	Television film
2008	Tranquility	Executive producer	Short
2010–2014	Warehouse 13	Dr. Vanessa Calder	6 episodes
2011	Alphas	Dr. Vanessa Calder	Episode: "Never Let Me Go"
2012	Scruples	Narrator	Television film
2013	The Thanksgiving House	Abigail Mather	Television film
2013	Wi Na Go	Mary Beth (Voice/Narrator)	Short
2015	NCIS	Barbara Bishop	Episode: "Blood Brothers"
2016	Love Finds You in Valentine	June Sterling	Television film
2016	A Change of Heart	Helen	Television film
2017	Eat, Play, Love	Rita	Television film
2018	Mingle All the Way	Veronica Hoffman	Television film
2018	Fuller House	Millie	Episode: "Angels' Night Out"
2018–2019	Grey's Anatomy	Helen Karev	4 episodes
2022	Blood & Treasure	Dani Kowalski	Episode: "The Ravens of Shangri-La"
2023	Generation Gap	Herself	Episode: "The Six Million Dollar Woman"

=== Video games ===
Year	Title	Role	Notes
2019	Death Stranding	Bridget (voice and likeness), Amelie (likeness only)	Amelie and the young Bridget digitally de-aged and voiced by Emily O'Brien

== Awards and nominations ==
Year	Association	Category	Nominated work	Result
1977	Golden Globe Award	Best Actress – Television Series Drama	The Bionic Woman	Nominated
1977	Primetime Emmy Award	Outstanding Lead Actress in a Drama Series	The Bionic Woman	Won
1978	Golden Globe Award	Best Actress – Television Series Drama	The Bionic Woman	Nominated
1974	Photoplay Award Gold Medal	New Female Star		Nominated
1977	Photoplay Award Gold Medal	Favorite Female Sex Symbol		Nominated
1978	Photoplay Award Gold Medal	Favorite Female Sex Symbol		Nominated
1984	Hollywood Walk of Fame	Star on the Walk of Fame - Motion Picture		Won
1989	CableACE Award	Actress in a Dramatic Series	Alfred Hitchcock Presents	Nominated
2003	TV Land Award	Superest Super Hero	The Bionic Woman	Nominated
2006	TV Land Award	Greatest Gear or Admirable Apparatus	The Bionic Woman	Nominated
2007	TV Land Award	Greatest Gear or Admirable Apparatus	The Bionic Woman	Won
2019	San Diego International Film Festival	Humanitarian Award		Won

== Books ==
- 1987: Lindsay Wagner's New Beauty: The Acupressure Facelift by Lindsay Wagner and Robert M. Klein (ISBN 0-13-536806-5)
- 1988: 30-Day Natural Face Lift Program by Lindsay Wagner and Robert M. Klein (ISBN 0-86188-779-4)
- 1994: High Road to Health: A Vegetarian Cookbook by Lindsay Wagner and Ariane Spade (ISBN 0-671-87277-X)
