= Robert Hinkle (stuntman) =

American actor, director and stuntman (1930–2026)

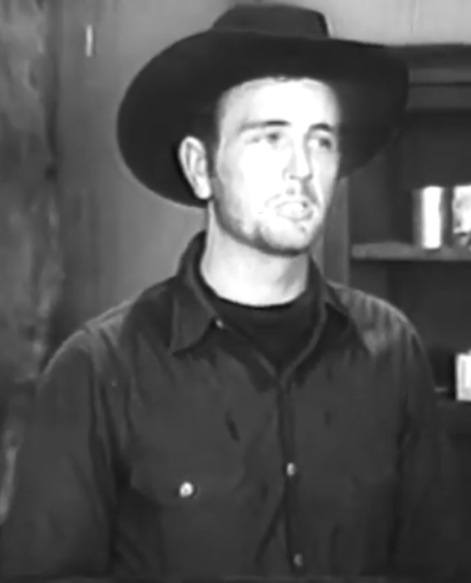
- Hinkle in Annie Oakley, 1957
- Born: July 25, 1930; Brownfield, Texas, U.S.
- Died: March 3, 2026 (aged 95); Austin, Texas, U.S.
- Occupations: Actor; director; producer; stuntman

Robert Hinkle (July 25, 1930 – March 3, 2026), also known as Texas Bob, was an American actor, director, producer and stuntman.

== Life and career ==
Hinkle was born on July 25, 1930, in Brownfield, Texas, where he was also raised. He served in the United States Air Force.

Hinkle began his screen career in 1952, becoming a stuntman for Budd Boetticher's film Bronco Buster. He then performed stunts for actors, Richard Burton, Robert Mitchum, John Wayne, Charlton Heston, Rock Hudson and Jim Davis. His television appearances included Gunsmoke, Bonanza, Tales of Wells Fargo, The Life and Legend of Wyatt Earp, Tombstone Territory and Wagon Train.

== Death ==
Hinkle died in Austin, Texas, on March 3, 2026, at the age of 95. He had suffered head, neck and back injuries during a fall on his driveway five days earlier.
