= List of cider and perry producers in the United Kingdom =

Cider and perry makers in the United Kingdom

List of cider and perry producers in the United Kingdom and their brands.

== Cider and perry producers ==
List of operational cider and perry producers in the United Kingdom
Producer	Brand	Town	County
146 Cider Company	146	Southampton	Hampshire
Addlestones Cider	Cloudy Cider	Shepton Mallet	Somerset
Apple Cottage Cider	Apple Cottage	Baldock	Hertfordshire
Apple County Cider	Apple County	Newcastle	Monmouthshire
Armagh Cider	Carsons	Portadown	County Armagh
Artistraw Cider	Artistraw; Catch Twenty Shrew; Across the Shrewniverse; Ruby Shrewsday; Mount Veshrewvius; Pygmy Perry	Clifford	Herefordshire
Ashover Cider	Ashover	Ashover	Derbyshire
Ashridge Cider	Ashridge	Totnes	Devon
Aspall Cyder	Aspall	Aspall	Suffolk
Aston Manor Cider	Frosty Jack's; 3 Hammers; Friel's; Kingston Press; Crumpton Oaks; Malvern Gold; Knights Malvern Oak	Birmingham	West Midlands
Barbourne Cider	Barbourne	Worcester	Worcestershire
Bartestree Cider	Bartestree	Bartestree	Herefordshire
Berry Farm	Berry Farm	Axminster	Devon
Blackmore Vale	Blackmore Vale	Templecombe	Somerset
Bottle Kicking Cider	Bottle Kicking	Hallaton	Leicestershire
Bridge Farm Cider	Bridge Farm	Yeovil	Somerset
Brookfield Drinks	Diamond White; Star Cider	Shepton Mallet	Somerset
Brothers Cider	Brothers; Mallets	Shepton Mallet	Somerset
H. P. Bulmer	Bulmers; Merrydown & Black; Pomagne; Scrumpy Jack; Strongbow; Symonds; Woodpecker Cider	Hereford	Herefordshire
Burrow Hill Cider	Burrow Hill	Martock	Somerset
Butford Organics	Butford	Bodenham	Herefordshire
Carey Organics	Carey Organics	Carey	Herefordshire
Carling Cider	Carling Cider	Burton upon Trent	Staffordshire
Celtic Marches	Celtic Marches	Bishop's Frome	Herefordshire
Checkley Brook Cider	Checkley Brook	Checkley	Herefordshire
Circle Cider (No longer producing)	Premium Wiltshire Cider	Swindon	Wiltshire
Cornish Cyder Farm	Rattler; Healey's Cornish Gold	Truro	Cornwall
Cornish Orchards	Cornish Orchards	Duloe	Cornwall
Crossman's Cider	Crossman's Prime Farmhouse	Hewish	Somerset
Dee Ciders	Dee Ciders	Whitford	Flintshire
Dorset Nectar	Dorset Nectar	Waytown	Dorset
Dove Syke Cider (No longer producing)	Ribble Valley	Clitheroe	Lancashire
Dunkertons Organic	Dunkertons	Leominster	Herefordshire
Fowey Valley	Fowey Valley	Fowey	Cornwall
Fosseway Cider	Fosseway Cider	Shepton Mallet	Somerset
Fynburys Cider	Fynburys	Grantham	Lincolnshire
Gaymer Cider Company	Gaymers; White Star	Shepton Mallet	Somerset
Glastonbury Craft Cider	Glasto	Somerton	Somerset
Green Valley Cyder	Green Valley Cyder	Exeter	Devon
Gregg's Pitt Cider & Perry	Gregg's Pitt	Much Marcle	Herefordshire
Gwatkin Cider	Gwatkin	Abbey Dore	Herefordshire
Gwynt y Ddraig	Gwynt y Ddraig	Pontypridd	Mid Glamorgan
Hallets Real Cider	Hallets	Hafodyrynys	Monmouthshire
Handmade Cider (No longer producing)	Handmade	Chippenham	Wiltshire
Haye Farm Cider	Hayes	Lostwithiel	Cornwall
Hecks Farmhouse Cider	Hecks	Street	Somerset
Henney's Cider	Henney's	Bishop's Frome	Herefordshire
Heron Valley	Heron Valley	Kingsbridge	Devon
Hogan's Cider	Hogan's	Alcester	Warwickshire
Kent Cider Company	Kent Cider	Canterbury	Kent
Kilmegan Cider	Kilmegan Cider	Dundrum	County Down
Lambourn Valley	Lambourn Valley	Hungerford	Berkshire
Llanblethian Orchards	Llanblethian	Cowbridge	South Glamorgan
London Gliders	London Gliders	Woodford Green	Essex
Lost Orchards Cider	Lost Orchards Cider	Dundee	Angus
Lulworth Skipper	Lulworth Skipper	Wareham	Dorset
Luscombe Drinks	Luscombe	Buckfastleigh	Devon
Lyme Bay Cider	Lyme Bay	Axminster	Devon
MacIvors	MacIvors	Portadown	County Armagh
MVC	Marshwood Vale Cider	Thorncombe	Dorset
Milltop Orchard	Milltop Orchard	Newton Abbot	Devon
Millwhites Cider	Millwhites	Bourn End	Somerset
Moles Brewery	Black Rat	Melksham	Wiltshire
Mr Whiteheads Cider	Mr Whiteheads	Alton	Hampshire
Old Monty Cider	Old Monty	Montgomery	Powys
Oliver's Cider	Oliver's	Burley Gate	Herefordshire
Once upon a Tree	Once upon a Tree	Ledbury	Herefordshire
Orchard Pig	Orchard Pig	West Bradley	Somerset
Orchards Cider & Perry	Orchards	Chepstow	Monmouthshire
Orgasmic Cider Company	Orgasmic	Wye Valley	Herefordshire
Perry's Cider	Perry's Cider	Ilminster	Somerset
Pine Trees	Dudda's Tun	Sittingbourne	Kent
Purbeck Cider	Purbeck	Wareham	Dorset
Pure North Cider Press	Pure North	Holmfirth	West Yorkshire
Raglan Cider Mill	RCM	Usk	Monmouthshire
Rich's Cider	Rich's Cider	Highbridge	Somerset
Ridgeway Cider	Ridgeway	Wellington	Somerset
Rocquette Cider	Rocquette	Castel	Guernsey
Rosie's Triple D Cider	Rosie's Triple D	Llandegla	Clwyd
Ross on Wye Cider & Perry	Ross on Wye	Ross-on-Wye	Herefordshire
Sandford Orchards	Sandford Orchards	Crediton	Devon
Sarah's Cider (No longer producing)	Sarah's Cider	Ledbury	Herefordshire
Sheppy's Cider	Sheppy's	Taunton	Somerset
Shepton Mill Cider	Addlestones; Blackthorn; Ye Olde English; K Chaplin & Cork's	Shepton Mallet	Somerset
Skidbrooke Cider	Skidbrooke	Louth	Lincolnshire
Skyborry Cider	Skyborry Cider	Knighton	Powys
Springfield Cider	Springfield		Monmouthshire
Snail's Bank	Snail's Bank		Herefordshire
Taunton Cider Company	Taunton Cider	Taunton	Somerset
Thatchers Cider	Thatchers; Vintage	Sandford	Somerset
Thistly Cross Cider	Thistly Cross	Dunbar	East Lothian
Torkard Cider	Torkard		Nottinghamshire
Tricky Cider	Tricky Cider	Churchinford	Somerset
Tutts Clump	Tutts Clump	Bradfield	West Berkshire
Ty Madoc Cider Farm	The Wobbly Owl Ty Madoc Cider	Hay on Wye	Powys
Ty Gwyn Cider	Ty Gwyn Cider	Pontrilas	Herefordshire
Upton Cider	Upton Cider	Didcot	Oxfordshire
Ventons Devon Cider	Ventons	Clyst St Lawrence	Devon
Virtual Orchard	Virtual Orchard	Old Wolverton	Buckinghamshire
Watergull Orchards	Watergull Orchards	Wisbech	Cambridgeshire
West Croft	West Croft	Brent Knoll	Somerset
West Milton Cider	West Milton	Bridport	Dorset
Weston's Cider	Westons Cider; Stowford Press; Old Rosie	Much Marcle	Herefordshire
Whin Hill Norfolk Cider	Whin Hill	Wells-next-the-Sea	Norfolk
Wilkins	Wilkins	Wedmore	Somerset
Williams Brothers Cider	Williams Brothers	Bedwas	Monmouthshire
Woodredding Cider	Woodredding	Ross-on-Wye	Herefordshire
Woody's Cider	Woody's	Burton upon Trent	Staffordshire
