= List of cider brands =

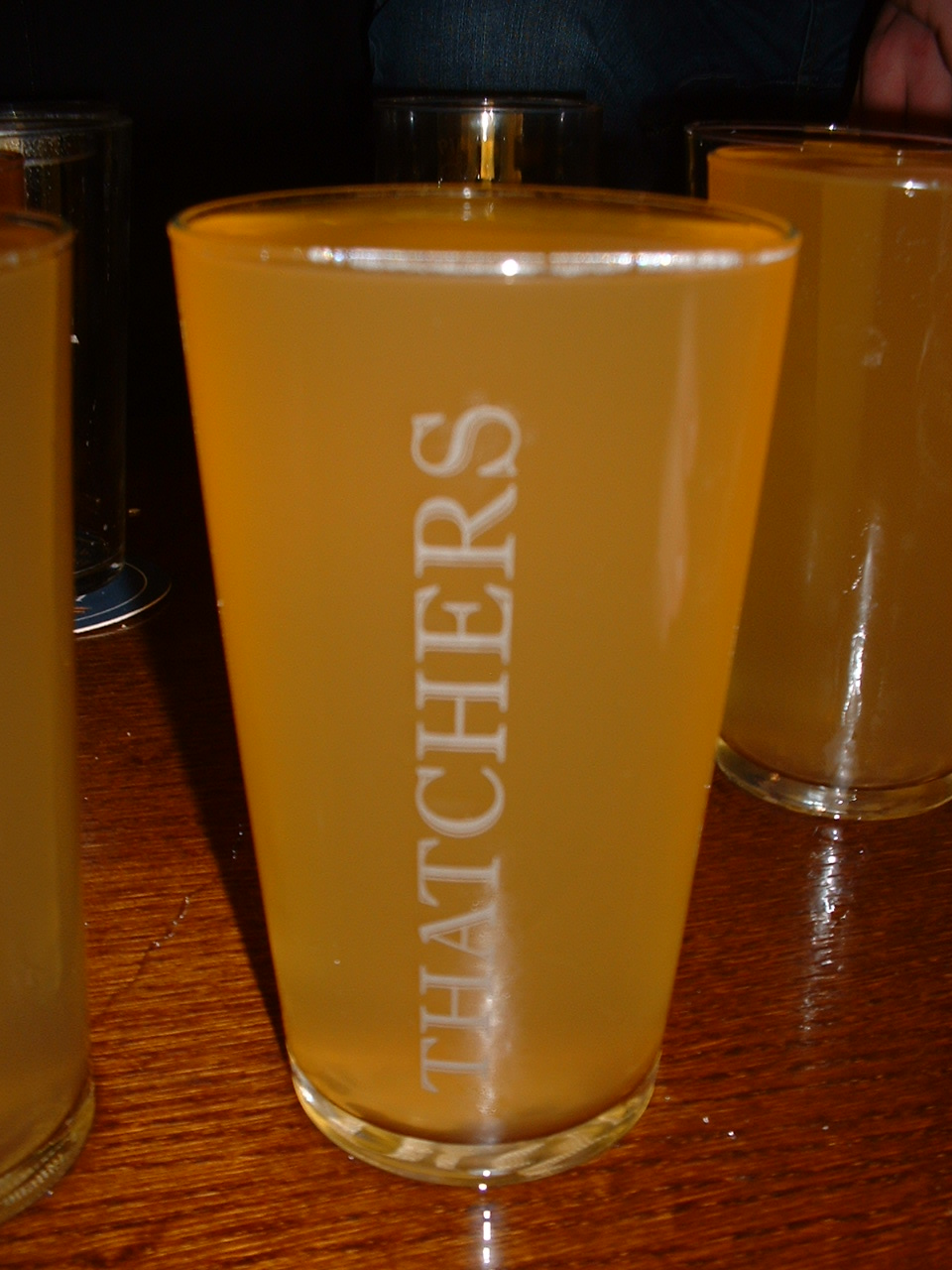
Draught glass of Thatchers cider

This is a list of cider brands. Cider is an alcoholic beverage made exclusively from the juice of apple or pear. This list also includes perry, which is a similar alcoholic beverage made from pear varieties.

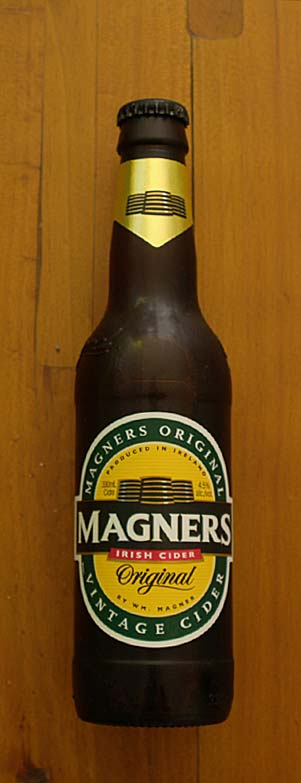
Magners cider

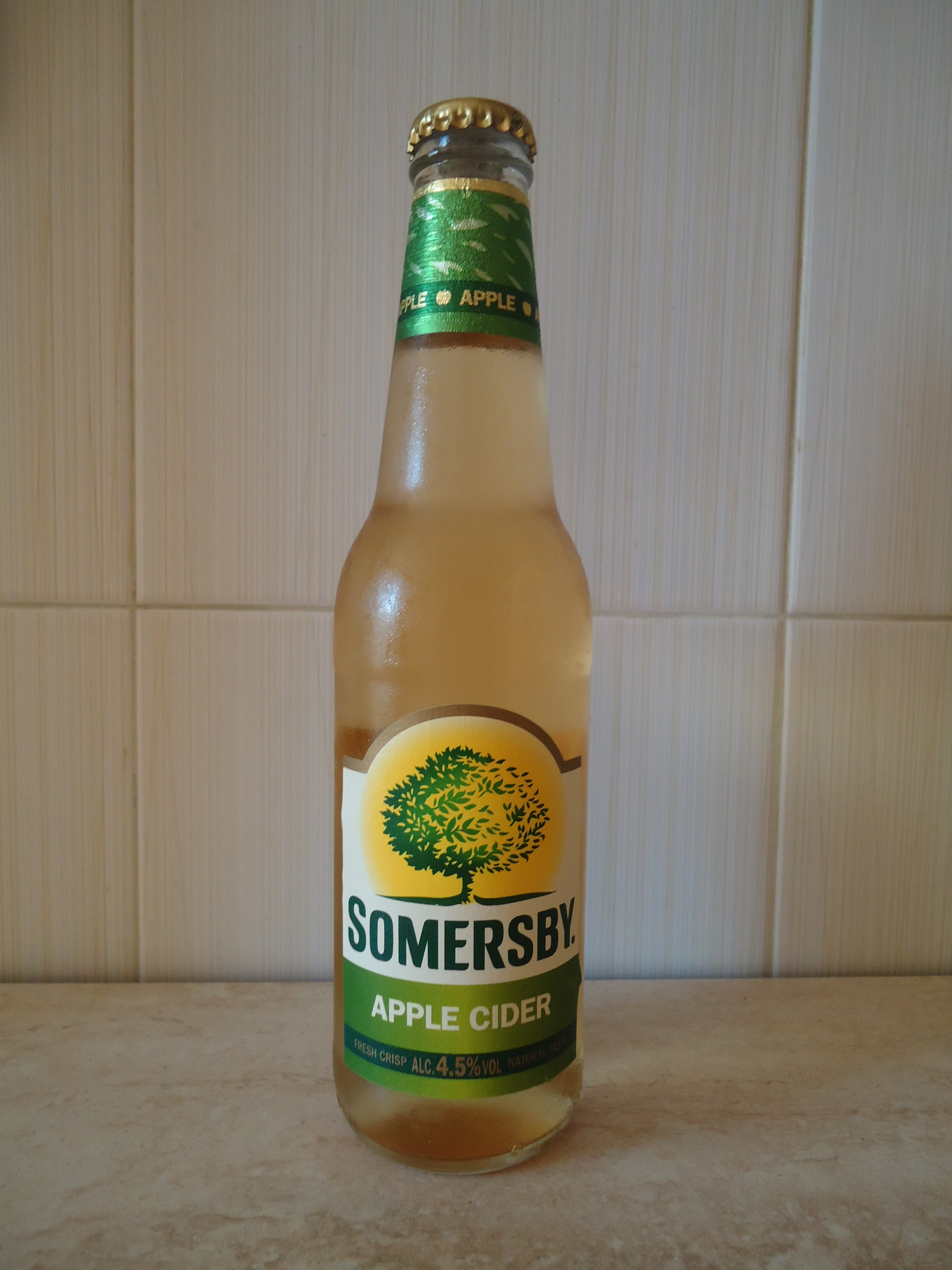
Somersby cider

Strongbow cider

== Operational brands ==
List of operational cider brands
Name	Town	Country	Type	Notes
2 Towns Ciderhouse	Corvallis, Oregon	USA		
5 Seeds Cider	Lidcombe	Australia		
Ace Cider	Sebastopol, California	USA		
Angry Orchard	Walden, New York	USA		
Arsenal Cider House	Pittsburgh, Pennsylvania	USA		
Aspall Cyder	Debenham	United Kingdom		
Bantam Cider	Somerville, Massachusetts	USA		
Black Star	Bedford	United Kingdom		
Blackthorn Cider	Shepton Mallet	United Kingdom		Constellation Europe
Bold Rock Hard Cider	Nellysford, Virginia	USA		
Brothers Cider	Shepton Mallet, Somerset	United Kingdom		British makers of Pear Cider
H. P. Bulmer	Hereford, Herefordshire	United Kingdom	hard cider	British makers of Scrumpy Jack, Strongbow, Strongbow Sirrus, Woodpecker, White Lightning, Pomagne and Bulmers Original
Lost Boy Cider	Alexandria Virginia	USA	hard cider	Sugar Free, unfiltered, unpasteurized
Bulmers	Clonmel, South Tipperary	Ireland	hard cider	Marketed as Magners outside Ireland
Burrow Hill Cider	Martock, Somerset	United Kingdom	hard cider	
Carling Cider	London, Ontario	Canada		
Ciderboys	Stevens Point, Wisconsin	USA		
Cidergeist	Cincinnati, Ohio	USA		Brand name for Rhinegeist's ciders
Crispin Cider	Colfax, California	USA		Discontinued
Cydr Lubelski	Lublin	Poland		Made by Ambra S.A.
Downeast Cider House	Boston, Massachusetts	USA		
Doc’s Cider	Warwick, New York	USA		
Fizz	Iisalmi	Finland		Finnish cider made by Olvi
Fox Barrel Cider	Colfax, California	USA		Pear cider brand, purchased by Crispin Hard Cider Company
Frosty Jack Cider	Aston, Birmingham	United Kingdom		
Gaymer Cider Company		United Kingdom		Producers of a number of brands including Gaymer's Olde English Cider, Blackthorn, K, White Star, Diamond White
Harpoon Brewery	Windsor, Vermont and Boston, Massachusetts	USA		Makers of Cider Jack
Herrljunga Cider	Herrljunga	Sweden	soft cider	
K Cider	Bath	United Kingdom		
Kingstone Press Cider		United Kingdom		
Kopparbergs	Kopparberg	Sweden	soft cider	
Magners Irish Cider (see Bulmers)		Ireland	hard cider	
Mercury Cider	Hobart, Tasmania	Australia	hard cider	
Merrydown	East Sussex	United Kingdom		
Orchard Crush	Camperdown, New South Wales	Australia		
Orchard Pig	Somerset	United Kingdom		
Miłosławski	Miłosław	Poland		Made by Browar Fortuna
Monteiths Crushed Apple Cider		New Zealand		Locally made by Dominion Breweries
Old Rosie	Much Marcle, Herefordshire	United Kingdom	hard cider	Made by Weston's Cider
Pomagne	Hereford	United Kingdom		Made by Bulmers
Rabbits Foot Meadery	Sunnyvale, California	USA		Made by Red Branch Cider Company
Rekorderlig Cider	Vimmerby	Sweden	soft cider	
Samuel Smith Old Brewery	Tadcaster, North Yorkshire	United Kingdom		
Savanna Cider	Springs, Gauteng	South Africa	dry cider	Ranked the world's number one cider brand by value and volume in 2023 and 2024, IWSR Global Cider Report.
Schneewittchen Cidre	Martinsmoos, Black Forest	Germany		
Scrumpy Jack by Bulmer		United Kingdom	hard cider	
Somersby cider	Copenhagen	Denmark	soft cider	Made by Carlsberg Group
Stella Artois cider brand		Belgium		Belgian Brewer, marketed as a Belgian style cider
Stonewell Cider	Nohoval, County Cork	Ireland		
Stowford Press	Much Marcle, Herefordshire	United Kingdom		Made by Weston's Cider
Strongbow Cider	Hereford	United Kingdom	hard cider	Made by H.P. Bulmer
Superstition Meadery	Prescott, Arizona	USA		Producer of the top user rated cider on RateBeer, the Blueberry Spaceship Box
Taunton Cider Company	Churchstanton, Somerset	UK		
Thatchers Cider	Somerset	United Kingdom	hard cider	
Three Hammers	Tiverton, Devon	United Kingdom		Made by Devon Cider Company
Three Oaks Cider		Australia		Made by Vok Beverages
White Crow Cider Co	Wichita, Kansas	USA	Hard Cider	
White Star	Somerset	United Kingdom		
Willie Smith's	Tasmania	Australia		
Woodchuck Hard Cider	Middlebury, Vermont	USA	hard cider	Owned by Northeast Drinks Group
Woodpecker Cider	Herefordshire	United Kingdom	hard cider	Made by H.P. Bulmer
Young Henrys Cloudy Cider	Newtown, New South Wales	Australia		

== Defunct brands ==
- Martinelli's formerly produced a hard cider, now only produces sparkling apple juice, California, USA
- Red Rock Cider, now defunct brand made by Taunton Cider, division of Blackthorn Cider, United Kingdom
- White Lightning, discontinued at the end of 2009

== See also ==
- List of cider and perry producers in the United Kingdom
