= Magners =

Cider produced in Ireland

- Bulmers logo used in Ireland
- Type: Subsidiary
- Industry: Alcoholic beverages
- Headquarters: Clonmel, Ireland
- Area served: Worldwide
- Products: Cider

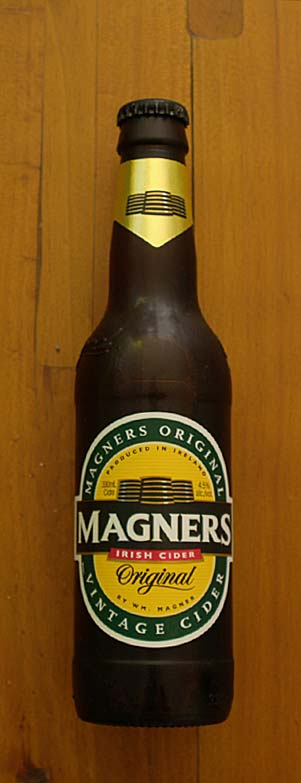
A 330ml bottle of Magners cider.

Magners Irish Cider /ˈmæɡ.nərz/ is a brand of cider produced in County Tipperary in Ireland by the C&C Group. The product range includes the cider varieties: Original, Light, Berry, Pear and Rosé. The cider was originally produced as Bulmers Irish Cider and continues to be sold under that name in Ireland, it is sold as Magners in all other markets.

== History ==
Commercial cider production was started in Clonmel, South Tipperary, in the then Irish Free State, in 1935 by local man William Magner. Magner bought the orchard from Mr Phelan from Clonmel. Magner quickly established a successful cider mill on the site of Thomas Murphy's brewery in Dowd's Lane, Clonmel. In 1937, English cider-makers H. P. Bulmer purchased a 50% share in the business, using their expertise to greatly increase production. In 1946, Bulmer's purchased the remaining 50%, changing the name to Bulmer's Ltd Clonmel. H.P. Bulmer maintained international rights to the Bulmer's trade mark, so that any exports were carried out via the parent company rather than directly exported from Ireland.

In the 1960s, H. P. Bulmer produced a "champagne perry" product in direct competition with Babycham, owned by Showerings Ltd of Shepton Mallet. Showerings challenged this in court, and H.P. Bulmer lost the case. In 1964, it was forced to sell Bulmer's Clonmel to Guinness and Allied Breweries, the parent company of Showerings. The company name was changed to Showerings (Ireland) Ltd.

Soon after, the company moved its main processing operations to a new complex at Annerville, five kilometres (3 miles) east of Clonmel, which was opened in 1965 by the then Taoiseach, Seán Lemass. Today the Bulmers/Magners arm of C&C Group employs more than 470 people and is a substantial part of the economic infrastructure of Clonmel.

The company also once produced Cidona, a popular soft drink in Ireland which, along with all of the company's other soft drinks, was sold to Britvic in 2007.

== Brand ==
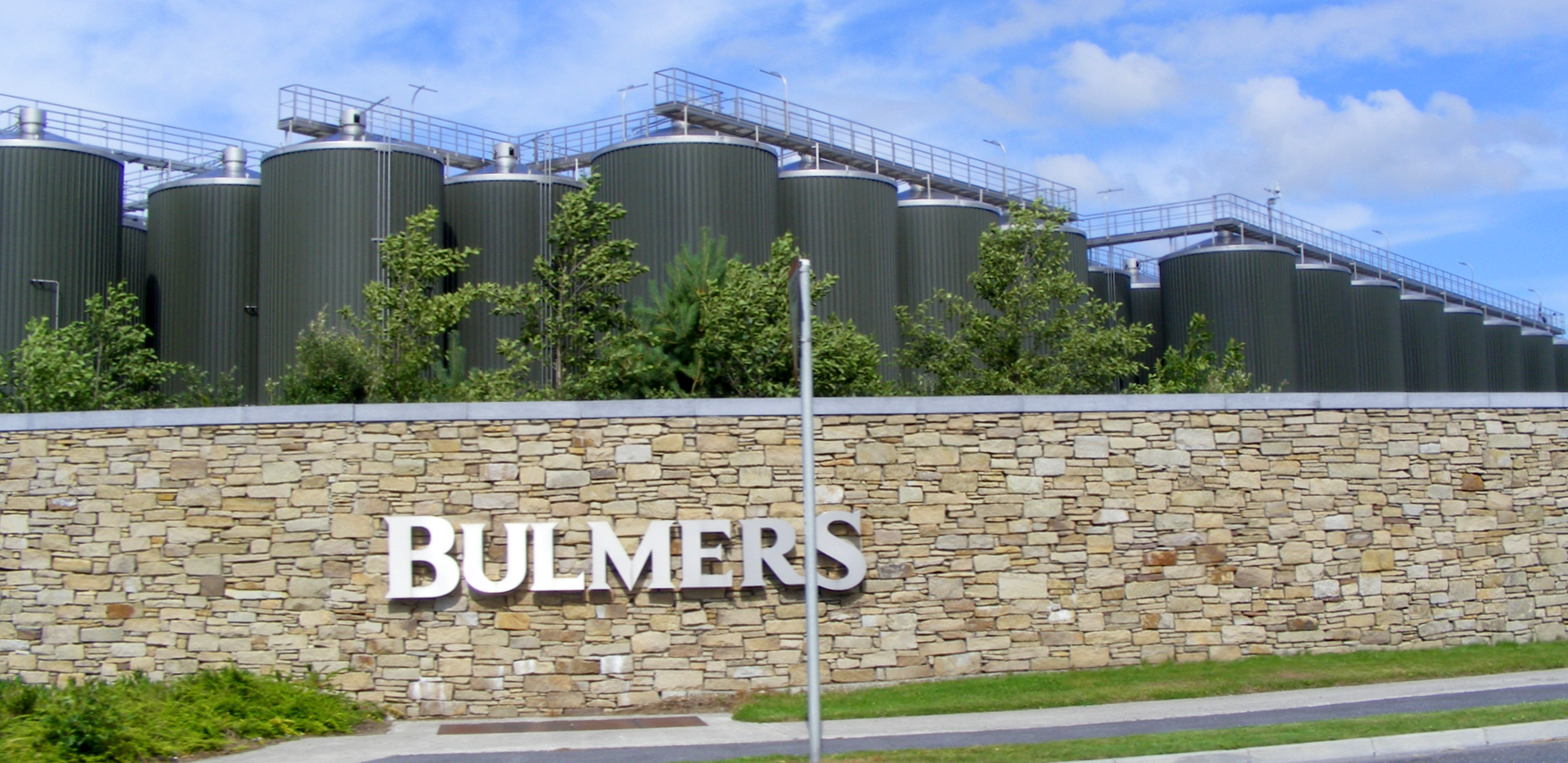
Bulmers/Magners cider brewery, Annerville, Clonmel

The success of Bulmers cider in Ireland led to the development of the Magners brand to market the company's cider outside of Ireland. Since H. P. Bulmer retained the right to market their original British Bulmer's worldwide, the C&C Group needed a new name under which to market their international product. The concept was originally developed by Brendan McGuinness and Shane Whelan, all of Bulmers Ireland, who argued that the international growth of Irish pubs provided a natural market for a drink such as Irish cider. Mallorca in Spain was the first market to sell Magners in May 1999, followed by Munich in Germany in July 1999. Magners was first sold in the United Kingdom in late 1999 when the brand was launched in Northern Ireland. C&C established the trade mark by selling to wholesalers and retailers in London, Glasgow, Birmingham and Cardiff.

Irish Bulmers cider and Magners have the same label and are identical products, except for the name. The ciders are made from 17 varieties of apples (with glucose syrup, E colours and sulphites added for flavouring, colour and as preservative), fermented and matured for up to two years. It is available in 330 ml, 440ml, pint, litre and 750 ml bottles and 500 ml cans, and is served over ice. It is also available in most Irish bars on draught and Magners is available in some bars on draught in Scotland. Initially the Magner's brand was only available in Spain, Northern Ireland and Scotland. The brand's popularity increased significantly in the 2000s, and it became available across the United Kingdom, Europe, Australia, Canada, New Zealand, Japan, Hong Kong, Singapore, Thailand and the United States.

In 2004, Magners Light, which is a low-calorie version of the cider, was released. In 2011, the Bulmers Light pint bottle was launched. In March 2009, a new perry (marketed as "Pear Cider") called Magners Pear was launched. In February 2010, Magners Berry was launched. The Berry variety is a blend of 17 varieties of apple, similar to Bulmers Original, fused with blackcurrants, raspberries and strawberries with an ABV of 4.5%. It is available in pint and "long neck" bottles in the licensed trade, and 440ml cans in supermarkets.

Magners Golden Draught was released in 2010 which is a traditional "old style" crisp cider available purely on tap in the on-trade market and in 2011 with 3 special flavours consisting of Spiced Apple & Honey, Pear & Ginger, and Spiced Apple & Rhubarb available in supermarkets and bars.

In August 2015, Bulmers launched four new flavoured ciders onto the Irish market, called the Forbidden Flavours range. The flavours are Cloudy Lemon, Strawberry & Lime, Berry Berry, and Juicy Pear.

In March 2017, Bulmers, as part of a €10 million investment, launched a new copper-toned packaging on its bottles and cans. As part of this new branding, a new sweeter cider called Outcider was also launched.

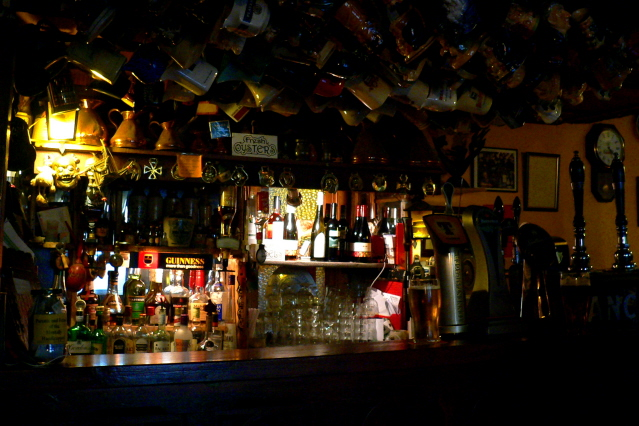
Signage in an Irish pub

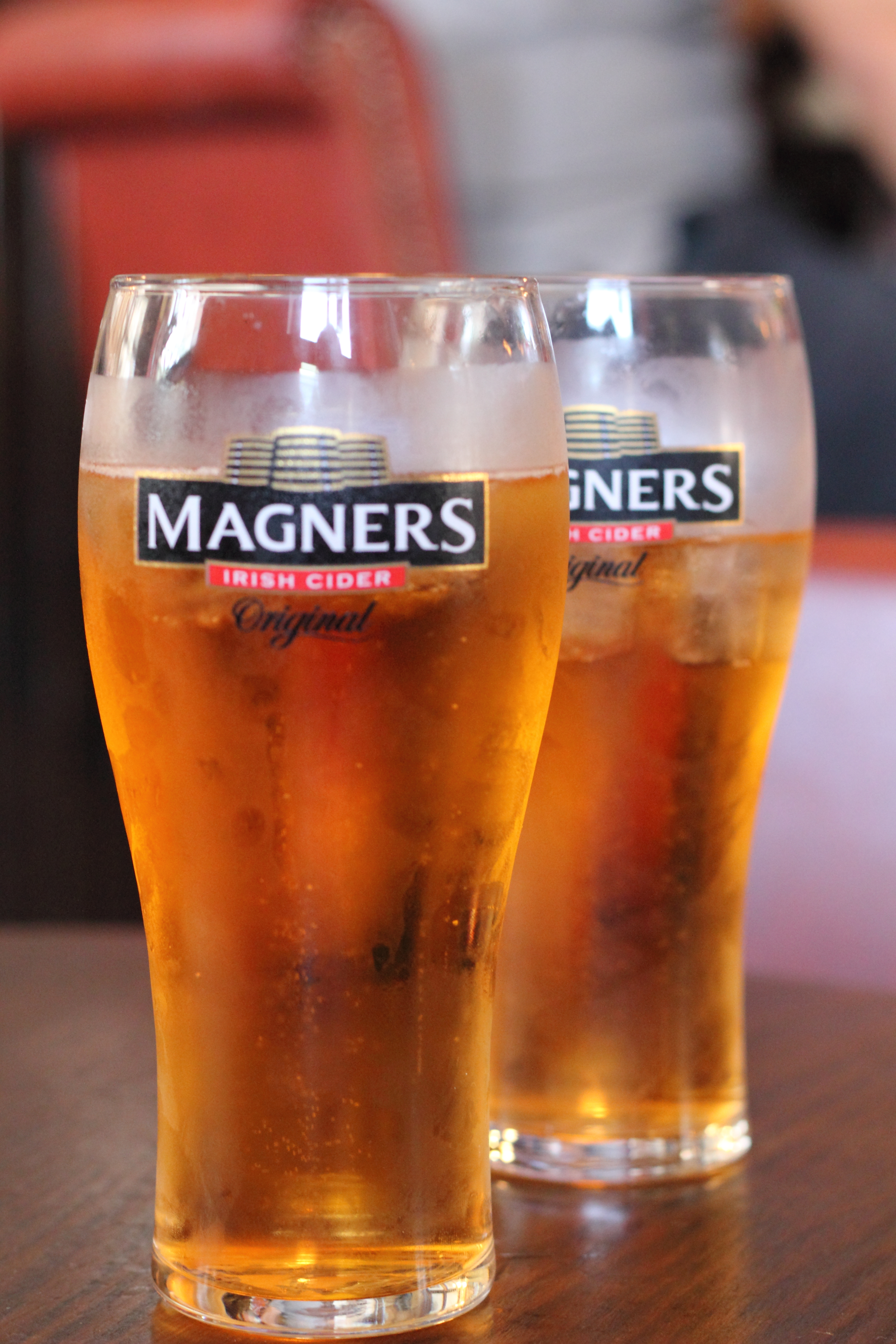
Magners pint glasses

=== Marketing ===
Typically, Magners is advertised as being poured over ice. Magners' success led to the UK's cider market leader Scottish & Newcastle introducing Strongbow Sirrus in summer 2005, a smooth version of its Strongbow cider produced specifically to be poured over ice, although Strongbow Sirrus has since been discontinued. In 2006 they also relaunched Bulmers Original in the UK, a premium packaged cider.

Magners made its introduction to the United States in 2000.

Magners began to research the possibility of relaunching its Irish cider in London in 2005. Specialists made it clear that alcoholic cider was a declining market which had little potential. Within 18 months after its relaunch Magners was the leading bottled alcohol brand in London.

The Magners brand was the title sponsor of rugby union's Celtic League beginning in 2006–07, when the league featured teams from Ireland, Wales and Scotland, and ending with the 2010–11 season, the first in which the league included teams from Italy. Magners sponsored the 2007 Brighton Fringe festival. From 2003 to 2005 Magners sponsored the Scottish football team Dundee F.C. The Magners brand was also one of the main sponsors of the 2009 Edinburgh Festival Fringe and is the main sponsor of the Glasgow International Comedy Festival. This has also extended to Singapore, where they sponsored the King's and Queen of Comedy Asia in 2010 and the Comedy Club Series.

In 2013, it was announced that Magners would replace Tennent's Lager as the main jersey sponsor for Celtic F.C. when that contract expired. Magners will be on Celtic's shirts for three years starting from the 2013–14 season.

On 20 August 2013, Celtic wore the Tipperary Natural Mineral Water logo on the front of their shirts for their UEFA Champions League first-leg clash with FC Shakhter Karagandy due to Kazakhstan's restrictions on alcohol advertising. Celtic switched to Tipperary Water as it is also owned by the C&C Group.

From 2019 until 2022, Magners sponsored the Cheltenham Gold Cup.

== See also ==
- List of cider brands
