= White Lightning (cider) =

Discontinued British white cider brand

- White Lightning 3 litre bottle, with the 'extra 50% free' branding
- Type: White cider
- Manufacturer: Inch's Cider
- Origin: England
- Introduced: Early 1990s
- Discontinued: 2009
- Alcohol by volume: 8.4% 7.5% (until May 2009); 5.5% (after May 2009)
- Ingredients: Apple pomace

White Lightning was a brand of English white cider produced from the early 1990s to 2009.

== Origin ==
White Lightning was originally manufactured in the early 1990s by Inch's Cider of Winkleigh. Inch's Cider was bought out by H. P. Bulmer in 1995, and in spite of initial assurances that production would continue in Winkleigh, the cider brewery there was shut and all production moved to Hereford. Bulmers was in turn acquired by Scottish Courage in 2003.

== Commercial success ==
White Lightning quickly gained brand recognition in the late 1990s-2000s in a competitive marketplace with its distinctive large deep blue coloured thin plastic bottles design, very low price and high strength, making it popular with those seeking strong alcohol with minimal money to spend. On its release, its strength was 7.5% alcohol by volume, although labelled as 8.4%. UK alcohol taxation provided a price-break for ciders up to 7.5%, which fuelled the original development of the white cider market. However before the 1996 budget, makers were allowed to over-state this strength on product labels, 'up-labelling', up to 8.4%.

After 1996 this law was reviewed. White Lightning was then sold at either 7.5% or 8.4%, the 8.4% now being slightly stronger, but having a higher price owing to the greater duty paid.

With gathering evidence of its adverse social effects that were becoming apparent, Heineken, the new owners of Scottish Courage, wished to distance themselves from the perceived negative impression of White Lightning. The price was gradually increased and the strength was finally reduced to 5.5% in May 2009.

== Production discontinued ==
At the end of 2009, Heineken decided to discontinue its manufacture due to its brand image problem in the United Kingdom as having become synonymous with under-age drinking, anti-social behaviour, homelessness and impoverished alcoholism, in an echo of the Gin Craze of the 18th century. Such cheap non-distilled drinks (both high-strength beer and cider) became known as "tramp juice" in the UK media. When sold on special at off licences, 3 litre plastic bottles of 8.4% White Lightning could be purchased for less than £2.

== Inch's Cider ==
In 2021, Heineken (the owner of H. P. Bulmer) relaunched Inch's Cider as a sustainable cider brand with a 4.5% medium cider available in the United Kingdom in cans, bottles and on draught.

== See also ==
- Buckfast Tonic Wine
