= Peardrax =

British and Trinidadian soft drink

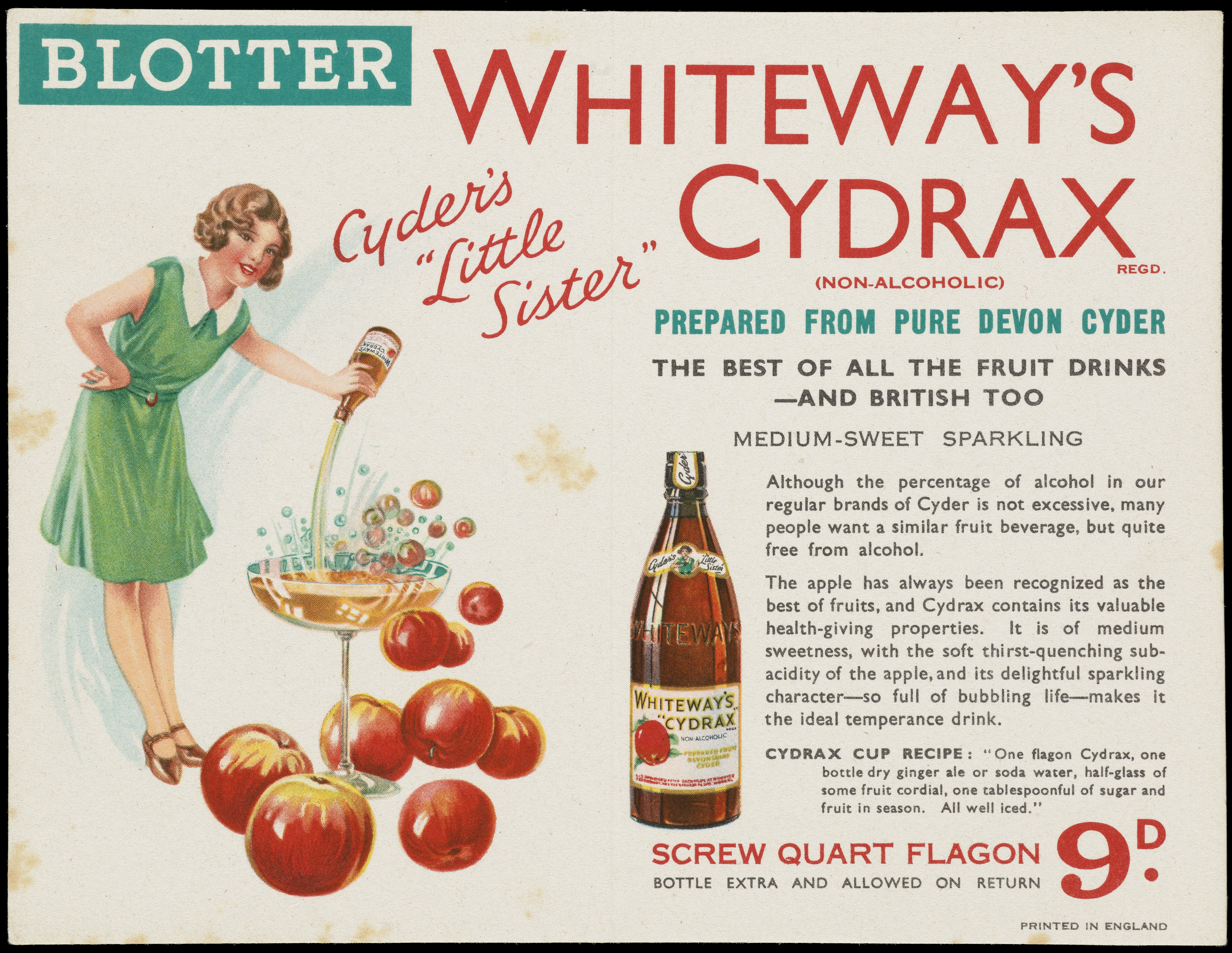
- Advertisement for Peardrax's sister product Cydrax
- Type: soft drink
- Manufacturer: Hand Arnold Trinidad Ltd. (a division of Caribbean Distribution Partners Ltd.)
- Origin: United Kingdom; Trinidad and Tobago
- Introduced: unknown
- Discontinued: 1988 (UK)
- Flavour: pear
- Related products: Cydrax

Peardrax, formerly Whiteway's Peardrax, is a pear-flavoured fizzy soft drink popular in Trinidad and Tobago. It originated in the United Kingdom, and was first manufactured by Whiteway's, a now-defunct cider company founded in Whimple, Devon during the 19th century. It became part of the conglomerate Allied Breweries in 1968, which merged into Allied Lyons in 1978, and eventually merged into Allied Domecq in 1994. Peardrax and Cydrax was discontinued in 1988, but its rights were acquired in 2004 by Gaymer Cider Company from Allied Domecq. Gaymer Cider Company was bought in 2010 by the C&C Group.

It is manufactured, bottled and distributed by Hand Arnold Trinidad Ltd., a division of Caribbean Distribution Partners Ltd., under license from the Gaymer Cider Company of the C&C Group, an eventual successor to the original Whiteway's.

It was especially popular among some British children during the 1960s and 1970s, though not by all: Victor Lewis-Smith recalls it as "a foul, resinous, cloying, sweet beverage" without even the "saving grace" of inducing drunkenness. It vanished from UK shelves in 1988, together with the apple based Cydrax, suffering from plummeting sales.

Sales of the beverage continued in Trinidad and Tobago to the point that "Trinidadians and Tobagonians now see the drink as a defining part of the culture of their twin-island republic." Until December 2017, it was manufactured and bottled by Pepsi-Cola Trinidad Bottling Company (part of PepsiAmericas Caribbean Operations), before both the Peardrax and Cydrax brands were bought up by Caribbean Distribution Partners, a joint venture of Trinidad-based Agostini's Ltd. and Barbados-based Goddard Enterprises.

== Nutritional facts per 250ml ==
- Calories: 140
- Fat: 0g
- Carbohydrate: 32g
- Sugars: 32g
- Protein: 0g
