= Blackthorn Cider =

Cider produced by Gaymer Cider Company

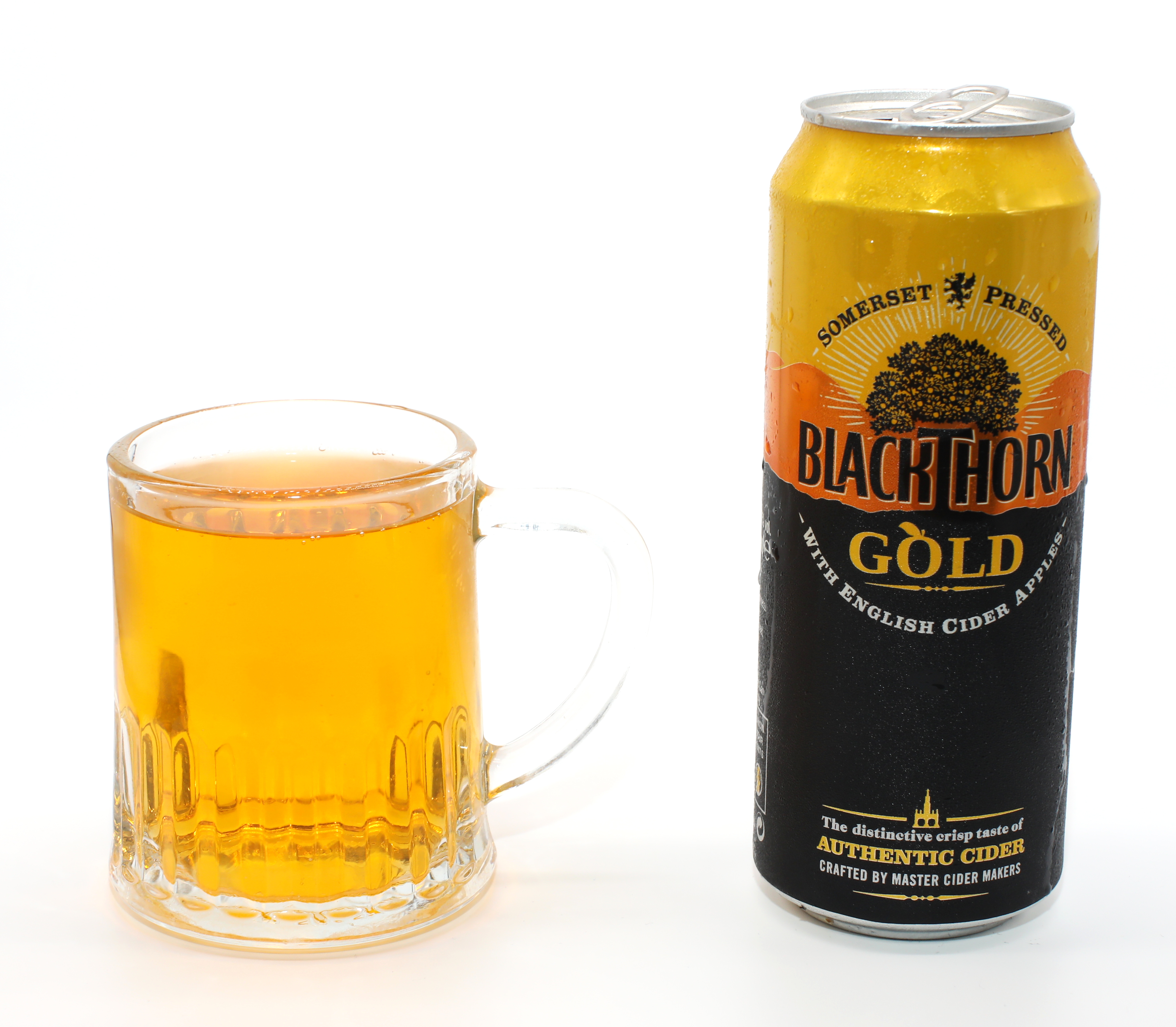
Blackthorn Cider

Blackthorn Cider is a cider produced by Gaymer Cider Company, a subsidiary of C&C Group. Previously it was known as Blackthorn Dry or Dry Blackthorn. It is sold in a variety of forms, commonly being served draught in pubs or being sold in 440 ml (15 imp fl oz; 15 US fl oz) cans or two-litre bottles in shops or supermarkets.

== Background ==
The Taunton Cider Company had produced traditional ciders from 1905 in Norton Fitzwarren, and became a limited company in 1921. After World War II, Taunton bought up local competitors, and from the 1950s started developing pasteurised sparkling ciders, which allowed the company to distribute product across the United Kingdom. The first Blackthorn-branded ciders were produced from the 1960s onwards, and became the company's main product line. In 1996, drinks company Matthew Clark plc, the UK division of Constellation Brands Inc., acquired Taunton Cider and all of its associated brands for £256 million.

== Production and formulation ==
As a non-traditional pasteurised sparkling cider, Blackthorn does not fit the definition of "real cider" as defined by the Campaign for Real Ale. Where traditional cider is made with whole pressed apples fermented by the wild yeasts present on the skins, Blackthorn contains apple concentrate, sugar and sweeteners and is fermented with a controlled yeast strain.

Until 2016, Blackthorn was produced at the C&C Group site on the A37 in Shepton Mallet (Mendip district, Somerset, England). After the production was moved from Norton Fitzwarren, the recipe was changed, making the taste sweeter and raising the alcohol content to bring the product more into line with the market leader Strongbow.

In March 2009, Blackthorn was reformulated. It was not well received by many consumers in its heartland in the south-west of England, who defaced The 'Black is Back' advertising campaign, alerted the press to their cause and organised Facebook protests. In March 2010, however, Gaymers announced that after the consumer backlash in the south-west, the 'original' Dry Blackthorn recipe would be re-introduced in the region. As a result, there are now two clearly defined products, Blackthorn and Dry Blackthorn, the latter being the original recipe, available only in the West Country.

In January 2016, C&C Group announced that the Shepton Mallet site would close in summer 2016, with production and packaging transferred to Ireland. It was also announced that C&C would 'continue to source apples on a long-term basis from local farmers' and 'warehousing operations will be maintained in the town'.

== See also ==
- List of cider brands
