= Diamond White (cider) =

Brand of cider

Diamond White is a brand of white cider produced in Shepton Mallet, Somerset, England by Brookfield Drinks, who bought the brand from the Gaymer Cider Company in 2013. Like White Star, it is a cider with an alcohol content of 7.5%. It was launched by the Taunton Cider Company of Taunton, Somerset, now part of Matthew Clark, in 1986, and is one of the company's major brands of cider. In 2015, Brookfield relaunched Diamond White with new branding, and launched Diamond Black, an 8% amber cider.

Its main competition is from other low-cost white ciders such as Frosty Jack's and White Ace, as well as other cheap alcoholic drinks such as Skol Super and supermarket branded beers like Tesco Super and Asda Super.

It is available in 2-litre bottles and in 500 ml cans.

== See also ==
- List of commercial brands of cider
