= Hofmeister Lager =

German beer distributed in Great Britain

Hofmeister is a pale lager with 5% alcohol by volume distributed in Great Britain.

== History ==
From the 1980s to 2003, Hofmeister was a 3.2% alcohol by volume pale lager produced by Scottish & Newcastle (later Scottish Courage). In 2007, Heineken International and Carlsberg jointly acquired Scottish & Newcastle, including the Hofmeister brand.

In 2016, Spencer Chambers and Richard Longhurst acquired Hofmeister from Heineken. The beer was relaunched with new branding and a revised recipe.

In 2017, Hofmeister won the Best Lager award at the International Wine & Spirits Competition (IWSC), becoming the first lager to be given five stars at the awards.

== Production ==
Since 2016, Hofmeister has been brewed by Schweiger, a German brewery located in Markt Schwaben near the Ebersberger Forest in Bavaria.

Hofmeister uses spring water from Schweiger's well, as well as locally grown barley and hops from the Hallertau region. The beer is slow brewed and light golden blonde in colour, with low carbonation. The product is imported from Bavaria for sale in the U.K.

== Advertising ==
The brand was marketed in the 1980s with the slogan "Follow the Bear" and an advertising campaign featuring a bear, George, with a shiny, yellow jacket and a pork pie hat.
