= Black Star (cider) =

Brand of cider produced in Bedford, England by Brookfield Drinks Ltd.

Black Star is a brand of cider produced in Bedford, England by Brookfield Drinks Ltd., the same company which produces White Star cider. It was introduced in 2015, and has an alcohol content of 7.5% abv.

It is available throughout the UK in independent and convenience stores in 500 ml cans.

== See also ==
- List of commercial brands of cider
