= Rhinegeist =

Craft brewery in Cincinnati, Ohio, US

Rhinegeist Brewery
- Interactive map of Rhinegeist Brewery
- Location: Cincinnati, Ohio, U.S.
- Coordinates: 39.1173°N 84.5201°W
- Opened: June 29, 2013; 13 years ago
- Key people: Bob Bonder, president & co-founder; Bryant Goulding, vice president & co-founder
- Annual production volume: 110,000 US beer barrels (130,000 hL) (2023)
- Website: rhinegeist.com

Rhinegeist Brewery (German: "Spirit of the Rhine") is a craft brewery and craft cidery based in Cincinnati, Ohio. The company also sells their ciders under the name Cidergeist, using an alternative apple-shaped skull logo. The brewery's 25,000 square feet (2,300 m^{2}) taproom and production facility is located in Cincinnati's Over-the-Rhine neighborhood, and occupies the former, pre-Prohibition bottling plant of Christian Moerlein Brewing Co. Rhinegeist operates an additional shipping, storage and innovation brewing facility in Cincinnati's Camp Washington neighborhood.

As of 2018, Rhinegeist was the 28th largest independent craft brewery in the United States and the 2nd largest in Ohio by sales volume. Rhinegeist currently distributes its products in Ohio, Kentucky, Massachusetts, Indiana, Pennsylvania, Tennessee, and Wisconsin. The brewery self-distributes in Cincinnati and Columbus, Ohio. Rhinegeist's annual beer production was 110,000 US beer barrels (130,000 hL) in 2023.

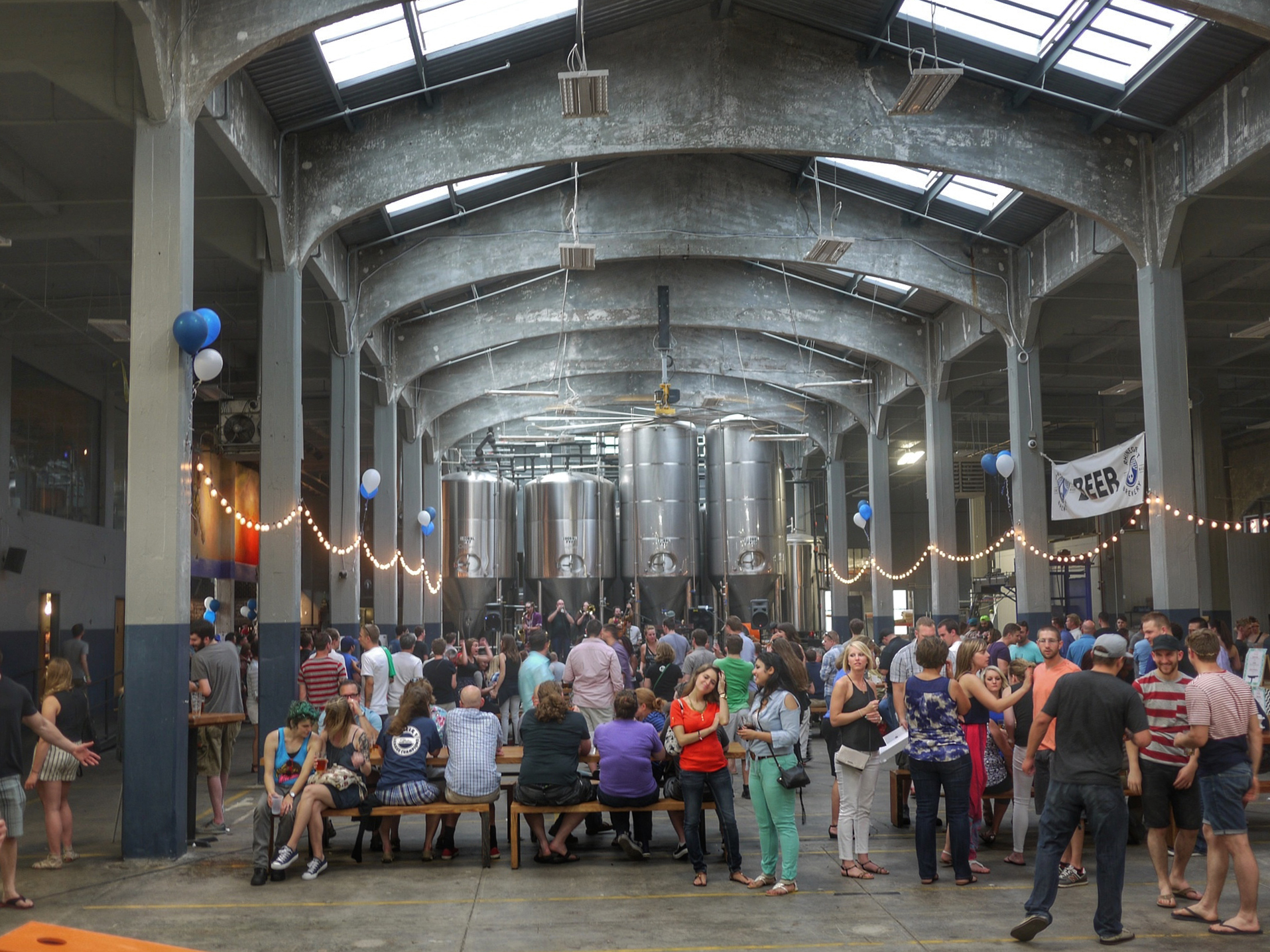
Rhinegeist's brew hall in 2014

== History ==
=== Origins ===
Rhinegeist was founded by Bob Bonder and Bryant Goulding, who first met in 2005 when working together as business consultants in San Francisco. After Bob moved to Cincinnati in 2007, he called Bryant in August 2011 with an idea for a brewery in the city, which he thought was "a vacuum for locally brewed craft beer." After planning for several months, Bryant moved to Cincinnati in July 2012. Searching for a brewer, the duo found Jim Matt, a pharmaceutical chemist and homebrewing hobbyist. They tasted some of his homebrews, including two that would later evolve into Rhinegeist's Uncle and Truth beers, and decided to bring him on board. After securing funding from local investors, they leased a 25,000-square-foot (2,300 m^{2}) building in Over-the-Rhine that had formerly served as Christian Moerlein Brewing's packaging hall. Construction work began in January 2013 and lasted until mid-2013.

=== Opening and early local success ===
Rhinegeist officially opened its doors to the public on June 29, 2013. Their lineup on opening day consisted of Uncle, Spikelet, Cougar, and Truth, which are a British mild ale, a hoppy wheat beer, a blonde ale, and an IPA respectively. They served around 2,500 customers on that day. They began opening their brewery taproom every Thursday through Sunday and distributing to local bars. By mid-July, they were distributing to about eight bars and were near the upper limit of their production capacity.

Rhinegeist began selling its beer in cans in February 2014, starting with Cougar and Truth. They added a third beer, a session pale ale called Zen, to their can lineup in May. The cans were available in five Kroger supermarkets by July, and in 65 by September. In December, they announced plans to expand to Kentucky with a new distribution facility in Erlanger. Market research firm IRI reported that Rhinegeist was the top new craft beer vendor of 2014 in U.S. supermarkets, based on $782,539 in supermarket sales. The brewery sold nearly 11,000 barrels of beer in 2014.

By late 2014, the brewery and its founders started receiving national attention. In September 2014, Bryant Goulding was credited by GQ as a craft beer expert. In November 2014, Rhinegeist's Truth IPA was named to a list of the 100 best beers in the world by Men's Journal.

=== Regional expansion ===
Rhinegeist annual beer production
Measured in barrels produced (US bbl)

In March 2015, the brewery announced plans to install a new brewing system that would enable them to triple their production rate and expand into the Columbus market. In May 2015, they announced plans to open a 17,000-square-foot (1,600 m^{2}) small-scale brewing facility in Columbus. They also expanded into hard ciders with the introduction of their new Cidergeist product line. They launched their first two ciders in their taproom in July before distributing them broadly to markets and restaurants in October. By the end of 2015, they were selling beer and cider in Cincinnati, Dayton, Columbus, and parts of Kentucky, and IRI reported they had sold 31,470 barrels that year.

Rhinegeist continued to expand its market reach over the years that followed. Rhinegeist arrived in Cleveland and Boston in fall of 2016. This was followed by Pittsburgh in March 2017, Indiana in July 2017, and Nashville in February 2019. In 2020 Rhinegeist expanded to East Tennessee and Wisconsin. According to founder Bryant Goulding, the company focuses its expansion on individual cities that are close to their existing markets, as a majority of their beer is self-distributed and must be delivered from their fleet of vans for freshness.

The brewery's production and sales volume increased with the market growth. Their annual production increased to 56,500 barrels in 2016, 86,242 barrels in 2017, and 100,302 barrels in 2018. In 2017, Rhinegeist was 33rd in 2017 on the Brewers Association's list of the largest craft brewing companies by sales volume, and in 2018, they moved up to 28th on the list.

As Rhinegeist's availability was growing on a national level, so too was its popularity. In February 2016, Rhinegeist earned second place in a USA Today Readers' Choice New Breweries poll. In March 2017, Forbes called Rhinegeist "arguably one of the hippest beer brands in the country." In April 2019, they were included on Thrillist's "32 Hottest Breweries in America Right Now." In November 2019, they were included in Paste's "50 Best American Breweries of the 2010s."

== Products ==
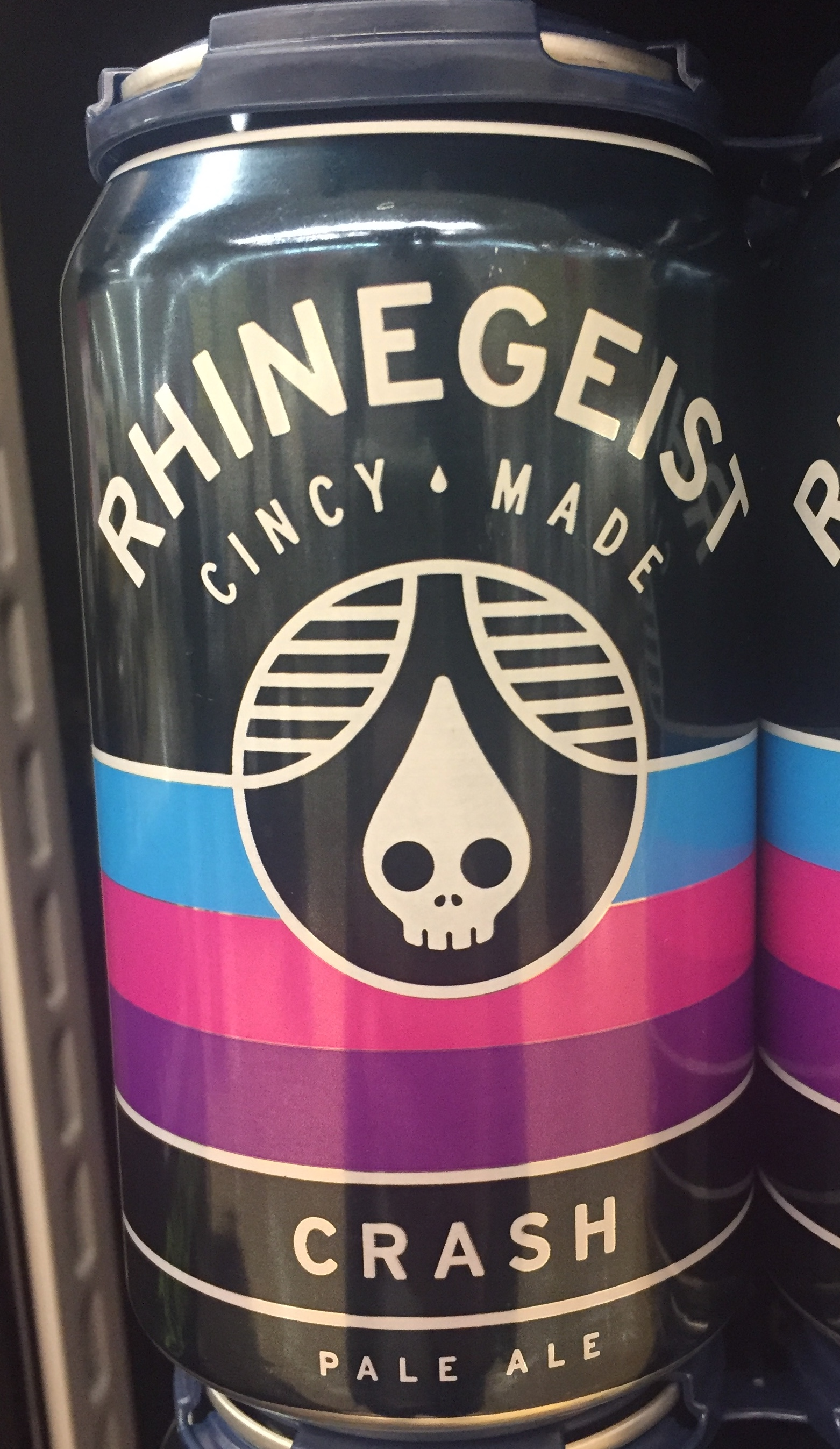
Rhinegeist Crash, with default logo

Rhinegeist offers four beers, two fruited ales and two ciders in cans year-round. Additionally, each year the brewery releases dozens of seasonal and limited canned, bottled and draft-only products. To date, it has released over 200 different beers and ciders.

=== Year-round products ===
- Truth (IPA) — recognized as one 100 best beers in the world by Men's Journal.
- Juicy Truth (Hazy Juicy IPA)
- Knowledge (Imperial IPA)
- Cheetah (Lager)
- Geist Tea (Hard Craft Tea)
- Bubbles (Fruited Ale)
- Zappy (Cider)
- Swizzle (Cider)
- Cincy Light (Lager)

== Location ==
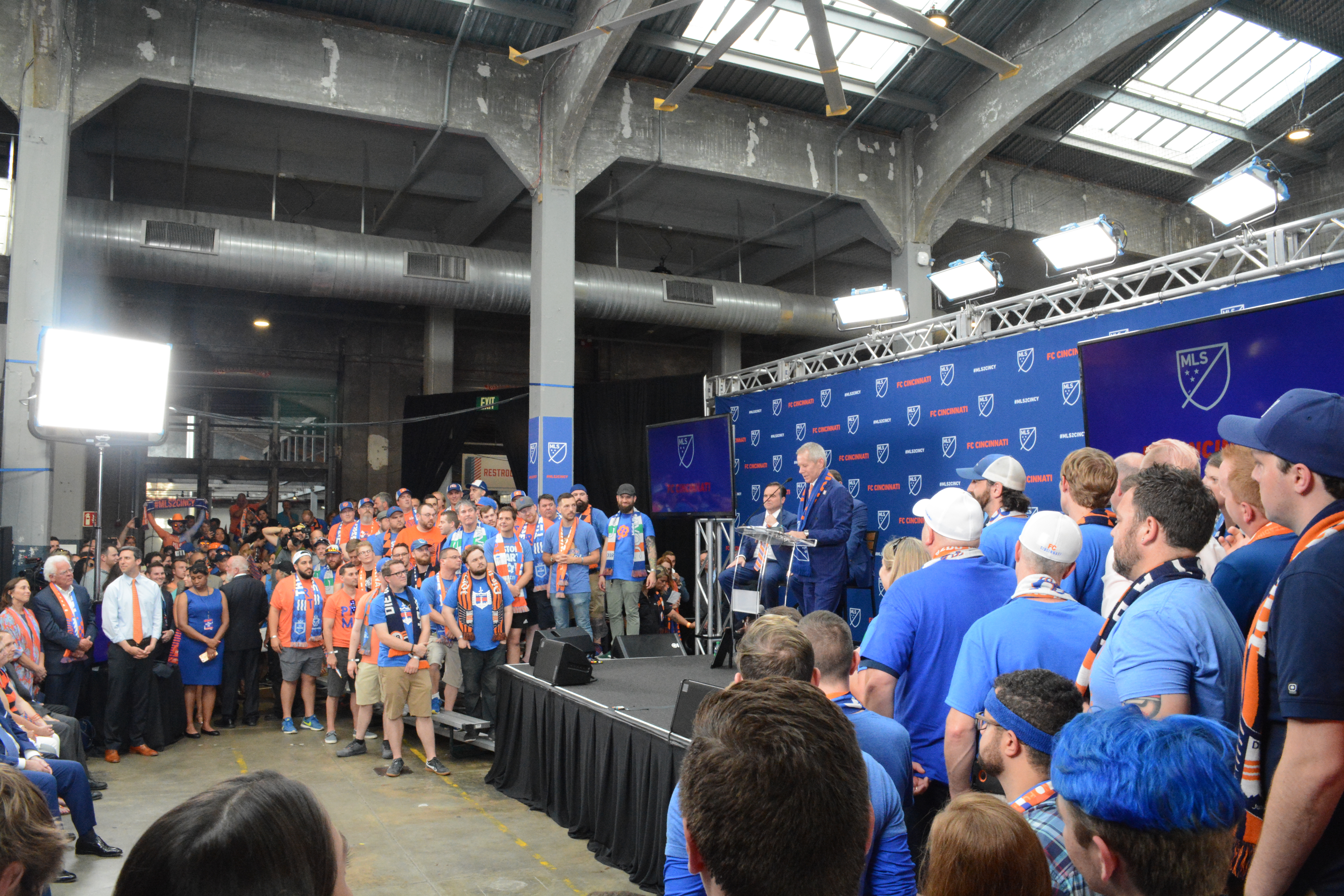
Rhinegeist's brew hall hosted the announcement party for FC Cincinnati being awarded a Major League Soccer franchise.

Rhinegeist's main brew hall and taproom are located in a 25,000 square feet (2,300 m^{2}) facility in the Over-the-Rhine neighborhood of Cincinnati. The taproom is open seven days a week and is open to all ages, offering games such as corn hole. In late 2015, Rhinegeist opened a rooftop bar at the facility which is restricted to patrons 21 or older. Rhinegeist's brew hall can also be rented out for private events; in the brewery's first five years, it hosted more than 250 weddings and more than 750 events.

In May 2018, Cincinnati Museum Center opened an exhibit of a Galeamopus dinosaur skeleton in Rhinegeist's brew hall. On May 29, 2018, Rhinegeist hosted the event announcing FC Cincinnati's acceptance into Major League Soccer as an expansion franchise.

== Rare Beer Fest ==
Rhinegeist hosts an annual, invitational beer festival called Rare Beer Fest. Participating breweries are asked to bring their rarest products, which are sampled by ticket holders over the course of two sessions. Past participating breweries include 21st Amendment Brewery, Allagash Brewing Company, Bell's Brewery, Brooklyn Brewery and Mikkeller.
