= Mythos Beer =

Greek beer made by Olympic Brewery, of Carlsberg Group

- Type: Beer
- Manufacturer: Olympic Brewery (Carlsberg Group)
- Introduced: 1997
- Alcohol by volume: 5%
- Style: Lager
- Variants: Mythos Ice; Mythos Radler; Mythos 0.0%
- Website: mythosbeer.gr

Mythos (lit. 'myth') is a Greek beer created in 1997, and since 2015 produced by the Olympic Brewery, a subsidiary of Carlsberg Group.

== History ==
In 1992, the Boutari Group purchased the Henninger Hellas S.A. company, the local Greek distributor of the German Henninger beer, founded in 1968, and in 1994 it was renamed as Northern Greece Brewery S.A., as part of a strategy to turn it into a genuine domestic Greek beer company. This was accomplished by the introduction of Mythos beer in 1997, and in 2001 the company renamed itself as the Mythos Brewery S.A., as Mythos had become its primary product. In 2004 Scottish & Newcastle became majority shareholders. Since 2008, it has been a subsidiary of Carlsberg Group which finally, in 2015, reformed Olympic Brewery after the merger of Mythos and Olympic Brewery, which it already owned.

== Products ==
Mythos (Μύθος) is a light straw-coloured, lager beer introduced in 1997. It is available in both 330ml and 500ml bottles and cans. The alcohol content is 5%. Mythos Brewery also produces Mythos Ice (filtered and chilled at -1°C at the same time) in 330ml bottles and Mythos Radler (with lemon) in 330ml bottles and cans. In 2007 Mythos Red was introduced in 330ml and 500ml bottles but has been discontinued since then.

== Availability ==
Mythos has broad Greek distribution and is exported to a number of European countries as well as the US, Canada, Panama, Taiwan, Israel and Australia.

In addition to Mythos beer, Olympic Brewery also produces and distributes in Greece, the former Mythos Brewery products the German brands Henninger lager and Kaiser pilsner and the local brand Golden, available at selected outlets in the local market. It also imports and distributes Carlsberg Beer (Denmark).
