= Scottish & Newcastle =

Defunct brewery

- Type: Public
- Founded: 1749
- Defunct: April 2008
- Fate: Acquired by consortium of Heineken and Carlsberg
- Headquarters: Edinburgh, Scotland, UK
- Key people: Sir Brian Stewart (Chairman), John Dunsmore (Chief Executive), Wilfrid Isaachsen (Chief Financial Officer)
- Products: Beer
- Parent: Heineken N.V.
- Subsidiaries: S&N UK; Alken-Maes; Beamish & Crawford; Brasseries Kronenbourg; Central de Cervejas; Hartwall; Home Ales; Mythos; Waverley TBS; S&N Pub Company

Scottish & Newcastle plc was a brewing company headquartered in Edinburgh, Scotland, which expanded from its home base to become an international business with beer volumes growing almost tenfold.

The company was listed on the London Stock Exchange until it was acquired by Heineken and Carlsberg in 2008 and its assets split between them. The name Scottish & Newcastle continued to be used for the UK trading operation of Heineken International until 2009, when it was renamed Heineken UK.

The former S&N Pub Enterprises leased pub division was rebranded as S&N Pub Company after the takeover. In 2012, it was rebranded again to Star Pubs & Bars, bringing an end to Scottish & Newcastle brand.

== History ==
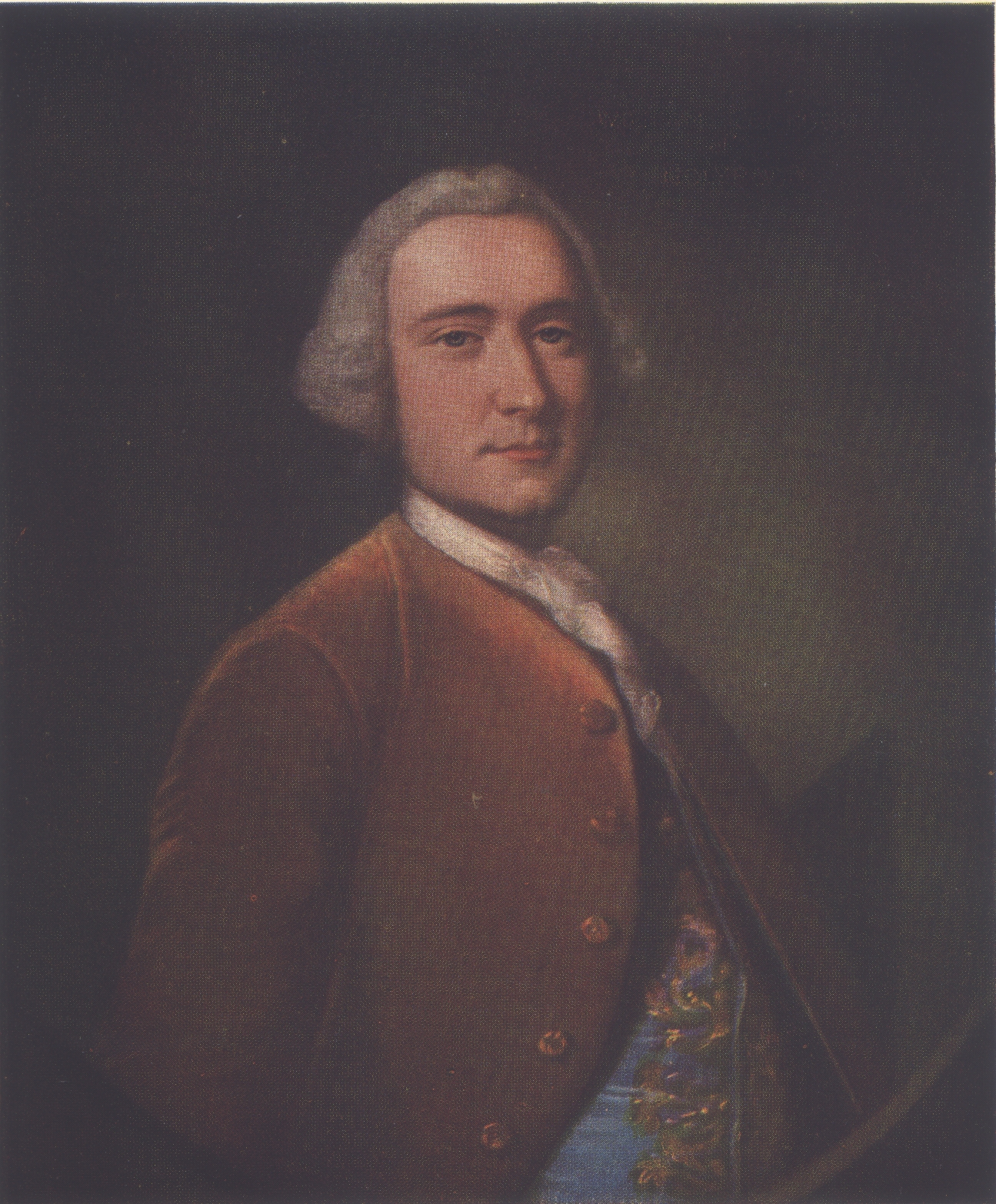
Portrait of William Younger by Alan Ramsay

The origins of the company can be traced to Grizel Syme who ran her late second husband's brewery: this brewery and those of her sons developed into the firm of William Younger & Co. It merged with McEwan's in 1931 becoming Scottish Brewers. In 1960 it merged again this time with Newcastle Breweries to form Scottish & Newcastle.

By 1985, the company had become a regional brewer focused on Scotland and the North of England.

By 1995, with the purchase of rival brewing business Courage, S&N had become the UK's leading brewer.

In early 2000, S&N expanded outside the UK via a number of acquisitions in Western Europe, growing sales to over 50 Mhl per annum. Acquisitions included Kronenbourg.

By acquiring Hartwall in 2002, Finland's leading beverage company business, S&N became 50% owners of Baltic Beverages Holding (BBH) encompassing brewing interests in Russia, Ukraine, Kazakhstan and the Baltic Countries of Latvia, Lithuania and Estonia. The remaining 50% of BBH was owned by Carlsberg, which gained full control after the takeover of S&N in 2008.

In July 2003, S&N acquired the Bulmers cider business, adding the Strongbow, Scrumpy Jack and Woodpecker brands to its portfolio, together with the UK's biggest cider mill and orchards in Hereford.

In November 2003, S&N sold its remaining pub estate to the Spirit Group – retaining a successful tenanted pub management business (S&N Pub Company) with contracts to look after some 2,000 pubs on behalf of banks and other pub companies.

In 2004 some radical cost-cutting measures were introduced, particularly within the UK where it was noted by analysts that the cost base was too high. During the year, the Fountain Brewery in Edinburgh was closed, followed some months later by the Tyne Brewery in Newcastle. This was followed in 2005 by the closure of distribution depots at Bow, Chelmsford and Maidstone with the task being integrated into Dagenham Regional Distribution Centre and depots at Hackbridge and Croydon with the remainder of the London accounts being served by Greenford. The company began to use transit points in Chelmsford and Faversham as cheap logistical alternatives to full working depots. Reciprocal acquisitions saw the Caledonian Brewery in Edinburgh and the Northern Clubs' Federation Brewery in Gateshead added to the business.

In February 2005, Scottish & Newcastle and Carlsberg UK finalised a joint venture to carry out Technical Services work in the UK. Service Dispense Equipment Limited (SDEL) was formed from the dispense assets of both businesses.

In 2006, S&N entered into a joint venture with the Swiss-based freight company, Kuehne and Nagel to set up a UK drinks distribution company (K+N Drinks Logistics). Some 3,000 S&N employees transferred to the new business.

On 17 October 2007, Heineken International and Carlsberg jointly announced that they were considering forming a consortium to bid for, and acquire the total capitalisation of Scottish & Newcastle. No formal offer had been put to S&N at the time. On 25 October, however, Heineken and Carlsberg announced that they had submitted a written proposal to S&N. They invited S&N to discuss a possible offer, the terms as to which they were prepared to proceed included a bid of 720 pence per share. The offer was immediately rejected by the Board of S&N, who believed that it significantly undervalued the worth of the S&N group. On 31 October, S&N announced that it had requested the Danish Courts to begin arbitration proceedings between itself and Carlsberg A/S in relation to the latter's alleged contractual infringements, relating to the joint ownership of Baltic Beverages Holdings (BBH). Carlsberg immediately countered that it believed S&N's claims were "spurious and without merit".

A new offer was made public on 15 November 2007 by Carlsberg and Heineken, raising the offer to 750 pence per share. The partners claimed this was "substantially in excess of the standalone independent value of S&N". On 17 January 2008, S&N announced that it was now in formal discussions with the consortium, following a revised proposal to purchase the business for £8 per share.

On 25 January 2008, following limited due diligence and discussions with S&N, the consortium announced a formal cash offer for the entire S&N business at £8 per share. This offer had the full support of the S&N Board and was recommended to shareholders.

On 31 March 2008, shareholders approved the £7.8 billion takeover by Heineken and Carlsberg. The acquisition was completed on 29 April 2008 as S&N's shares were delisted from the London Stock Exchange.

On 23 November 2009, the company changed its name to Heineken UK Ltd. to reflect the owner's name.

== Breweries ==
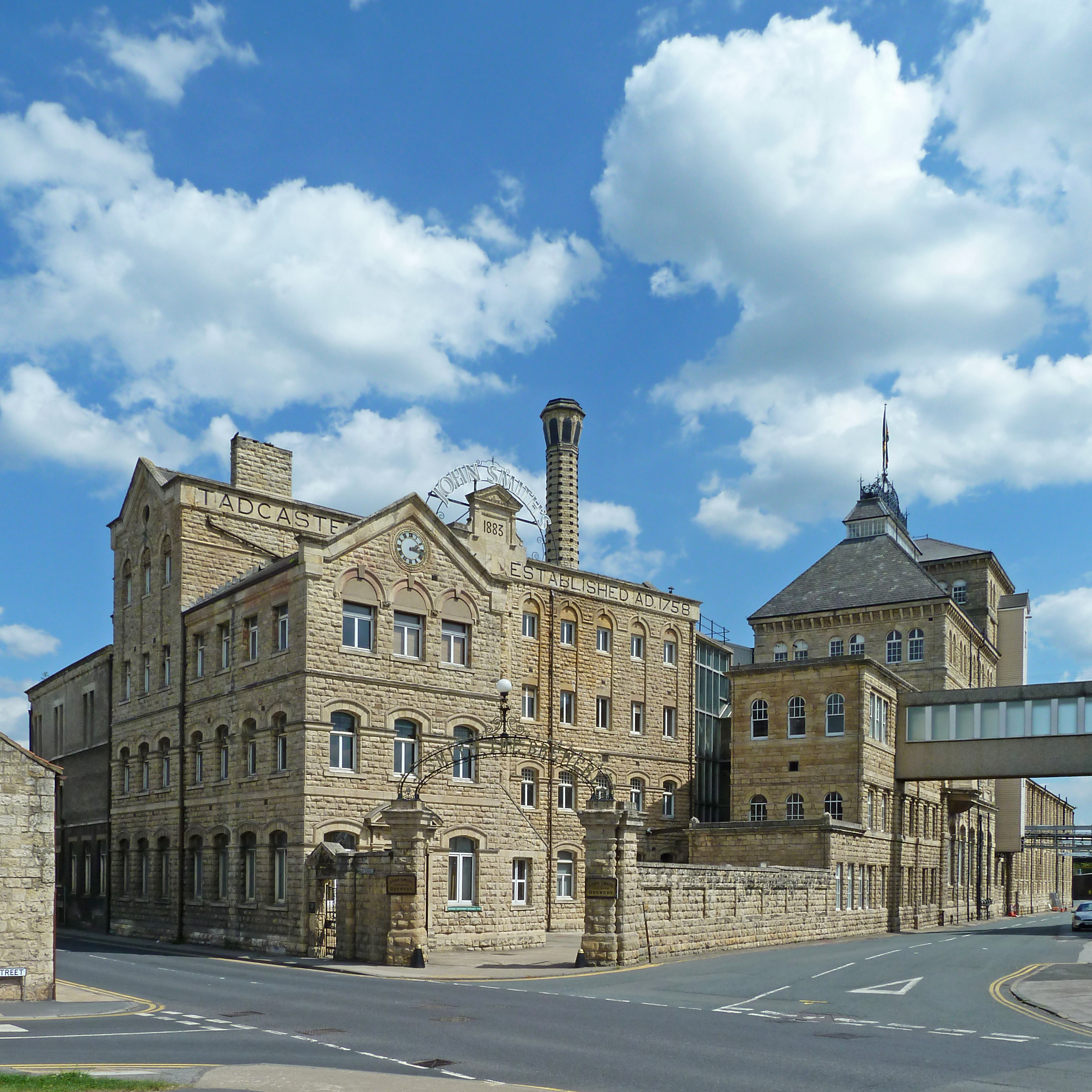
John Smith's Brewery, Tadcaster

Scottish & Newcastle employed 40,000 people in the United Kingdom and mainland Europe, brewing beer at:

- The Fountain Brewery, Edinburgh – closed 2004
- Caledonian Brewery, Edinburgh – closed 2022
- The Tyne Brewery, Newcastle upon Tyne – closed 2005
- The Federation Brewery, Gateshead – bought 2004, closed 2010
- T & R Theakston's Brewery, Masham (S&N had a majority holding in this brewery. It is now once again owned by the Theakston family)
- John Smith's Brewery, Tadcaster
- The Berkshire Brewery, Reading (closed April 2010)
- The Royal Brewery, Manchester
- Beamish Brewery, Cork
- Crawford Brewery, Cork

== Operations ==
S&N owned or co-owned three of the top ten beers in Europe.

- Baltika (stake acquired by Carlsberg)
- Foster's (European rights, now owned by Heineken)
- Kronenbourg 1664. (now owned by Carlsberg, although S&N UK/Heineken retain UK rights on a 50-year supply contract)

In addition to these key brands, its portfolio included other well-known drinks brands (acquirer in brackets):

- John Smith's (Heineken)
- Strongbow (cider) in the UK. (Heineken)
- Sagres in Portugal (Heineken)
- Lapin Kulta in Finland (Heineken)
- Mythos in Greece (stake acquired by Carlsberg)
- Maes pils in Belgium (Heineken)
- Kingfisher in India (stake acquired by Heineken)
- Beamish Stout in Ireland (Heineken)
- Bulmers Cider in the UK. (Heineken)
- Newcastle Brown Ale, heartland in the North East of England. (Heineken)
- Grimbergen, a Belgian Abbey beer. (Carlsberg)
- McEwan's in Scotland. (Heineken)
- Younger's in Edinburgh, Scotland. (Heineken)
- Simonds of Reading, Berkshire. (Wells & Young)

Brands licensed to them included:

- Beamish
- Courage
- Foster's
- Kronenbourg
- McEwan's
- Newcastle Brown Ale
- John Smith's
- Websters

The Hofmeister brand was a 3.2% abv pale lager produced by Scottish Courage (later Scottish & Newcastle) from the 1980s to 2003. The brand was marketed in the 1980s with a series of advertisements featuring a bear, George, with a shiny, yellow jacket and a pork pie hat. In 2016, the Hofmeister brand returned with a new 5% recipe.

== Division of the business between the Carlsberg/Heineken consortium ==
Heineken acquired:

S&N UK; Beamish and Crawford – ROI; Hartwall – Finland; Alken Maes – Belgium; Central de Cervejas – Portugal; Indian JV with UB; US export business and other venture markets.

Carlsberg acquired:

Remaining 50% of Baltic Beverages Holdings; Kronenbourg – France; Mythos (beer) – Greece; Chongqing joint venture in China; Venture markets:- Switzerland; Africa; Hungary; Luxembourg; Indian Ocean; South and Central America and Asia.
