= Ace Cider =

American cider company

- Company type: Public
- Founded: July 1993; 32 years ago
- Founder: Jeffrey House
- Headquarters: Sebastopol, California, United States
- Parent: Vintage Wine Estates, Inc.
- Website: acecider.com

Ace Cider is a hard cider company based in Sebastopol, California, United States. It is independently owned.

== History ==
California Cider was founded by Jeffrey House in July 1993. The company makes cider, an alcoholic beverage fermented from apples, and was one of the first cider companies formed in the US after the end of Prohibition. ACE Cider also opened the first modern cider-centered pub in the US in 1999. The pub closed in 2010. House located his business in the Sonoma County historic apple growing region because it reminded him of his native England.

On November 15, 2021, Ace Cider was sold to Vintage Wine Estates, Inc. for $47.4 million. In July 2024, Vintage Wine Estates filed for Chapter 11 bankruptcy protection, with plans to sell all of its assets, including Ace Cider.

== Location ==
ACE Cider has become a significant employer in the largely rural "West County" portion of Sonoma County, including Sebastopol, home of the Gravenstein apple. The company's existence and success (as demonstrated by rapid sales growth in the 3–5 years prior to 2013 in particular) bucks the trend of the "homogenization" of the county's agricultural economy, i.e. the domination of agriculture by the production of wine grapes.

== See also ==
- List of cider brands
