= Gaymer Cider Company =

Beverage producer

The Gaymer Cider Company produced and marketed cider. It has been owned by C&C Group since 2010. However, the Gaymer brand is no longer used and the business has been consolidated into the parent company.

== History ==
It is unknown when the Gaymer family started selling cider. An advertisement in 1875 describes them as being "established upwards of two centuries", one of 1883 "established nearly two centuries", a 1961 newspaper report talks of "more than 300 years" and a modern bar towel has the phrase "established 1770" on it. One source states that, in 1784, Robert Gaymer moved with his family from Starston to Banham (both are places in Norfolk), where he farmed "and produced the first identifiable Gaymer cider". His son John, "Long" John as he was known, due to his height of 6 ft 10½in., continued the cider-making. Indeed, an advertisement from "The Bury and Norwich Post" of 26 May 1800 states that he had inherited the trade secrets of his father-in-law Joseph Chapman, which were "the result of the last ten years practice and experience" and that "The cydermaking business is carried on by the said John Gaymer at Banham aforesaid, by whom all orders will be thankfully received, and readily executed". Joseph Chapman was describing himself as a "cyder merchant" in 1781. "Long" John was buried in Banham churchyard in 1843.

The entry for Banham in White's Directory for 1845 makes no mention of cider, and William Gaymer is simply listed as a "victualler" at The Crown, but The Post Office Directory for 1846 describes him as landlord of The Crown, "cyder manufacturer" and farmer, and White's for 1854 as a "victualler and cider manufacturer". In 1864, he is still at The Crown but is now, perhaps reflecting the changing emphasis of his business, a "cider manufacturer and victualler", and is still a farmer. By 1868, William Gaymer is listed as "Wm. Gaymer (senior)" and William Gaymer (junior) is a farmer.

It was William Gaymer, junior (1842–1936) who built up the family business to the point at which it employed 400 men, had a London office, a royal warrant and a lively export trade, and was a household name. In 1870, he introduced a hydraulic press and began to produce the cider even more commercially for the home market and export. By the late nineteenth century Gaymers had won seven awards at Royal Agricultural Shows and The Royal Horticultural Society's Silver Banksian Medal.

In 1896, Gaymers moved their business to the nearby town of Attleborough, where the factory had its own railway siding. Because of the rapid expansion Gaymer had difficulty obtaining enough apples of the right quality and variety and established contact with a number of suppliers in Devon. In 1903, the entire apple crop in Britain was a failure: to avert disaster Gaymer set off for Canada by ship and bought enough apples for that year's production.

In 1961, Showerings of Shepton Mallet bought the company. After Showerings subsequently merged with Allied Breweries in 1968, the cider business was demerged under via management buyout In January 1992, in a new company called Gaymer Group. The Attleborough factory was saved from threatened closure in 1973. In November 1994, Gaymer Group was acquired by Matthew Clark plc, and production was transferred to Shepton Mallet. With modern techniques the new owners were able to carry on making the distinctive Gaymer's cider in Somerset without affecting the distinctive taste. The Attleborough factory finally closed its doors in 1995.

The brand is no longer used by C&C.

== Olde English cider ==
Olde English was a brand of cider (formerly known by the alternative spelling cyder). Unlike most English ciders being grown in the west of the country in counties such as Devon, Herefordshire and Somerset, Gaymer's originated in eastern England.

"Ye Olde English Cyder" was apparently designed for the American market in 1939, but never shipped out due to the outbreak of the Second World War: it was sold in the UK as a special offer during the war and until 1950, and then became a standard product of the company. By the time of the Showerings takeover in 1961 "Olde English" was Gaymer's best known product.

Before the brand's demise, Gaymer's Olde English was mostly sold through supermarkets and off licence chains. In 2007, coinciding with a can redesign, the strength of canned Olde English was reduced from 5.3% ABV to 4.5% ABV.

== Present ==
After Matthew Clark was acquired by Constellation Brands in 1998, it consolidated its cider production at Gaymers in Shepton Mallet. In 2010, it sold the business to C&C Group PLC which in January 2016 announced that production and packaging will move from Shepton Mallet to Clonmel in Ireland.

In 2016, the Showering Brothers bought the Shepton Mallet factory from C&C Group plc but not the brands, returning ownership to the family that had founded it. Matthew Showering said "Our grandfather built the factory and so it's be great to get back there. We used to go there as children and it came out of the family business when it was sold to Allied Breweries in the late 60s so it's great to reconnect with the place."

The Gaymer Cider Company's range once included:

- Addlestones Marketed by C&C Group plc
- Babycham. Now owned by the Showerings' Brothers Drinks Company and the mascot fawn is on display outside the Shepton Mallet cider mill.
- Blackthorn Marketed by C&C Group plc
- Chaplin & Cork's Marketed by C&C Group plc
- Gaymers. Discontinued.
- K Marketed by C&C Group plc
- Natch Now made by start-up company Taunton Cider.
- Special Vat Discontinued
- Ye Olde English Discontinued
- Taunton Traditional Now made and sold by start-up company Taunton Cider.
- White Star Sold to Brookfield in 2013.

Gaymer also owned the rights to Cydrax and Peardrax, apple and pear-flavoured brands of soft drinks which originated in the U.K. but are currently manufactured only in Trinidad and Tobago.
