= Martinelli's =

California based beverage company

- Industry: Apple juice
- Founded: 1868; 158 years ago in Watsonville, California
- Founder: Stephen Gaspare Martinelli
- Website: www.martinellis.com

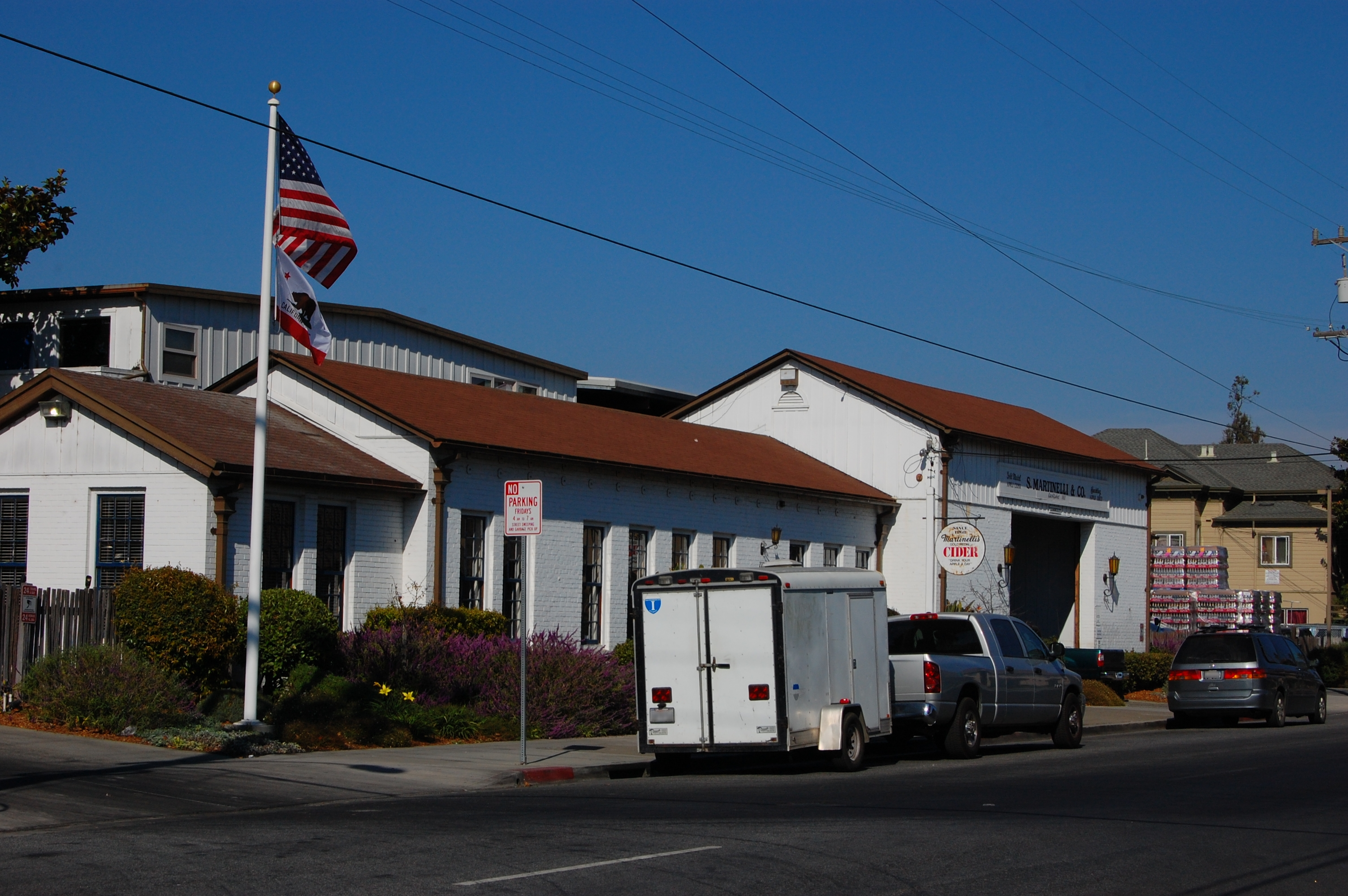
Company buildings

Martinelli's is the brand name of S. Martinelli & Company, a non-alcoholic cider and juice company founded in 1868 and located in Watsonville, California. The company is privately held by descendants of the founders. It is best known for its non-alcoholic sparkling apple cider and its apple juice.

== History ==
Stepheno Martinelli emigrated in the late 1850s from Switzerland to California and moved to his brother Luigi's farm in Watsonville. Stepheno initially was in the soda business and realized he could make money by creating hard ciders from the apples grown on his brother's farm. The company was founded in 1868 in the Pajaro Valley by the two Martinelli brothers.

Stepheno previously had experience making champagne in France. The recipe won a gold medal at the 1890 California State Fair. As of 2021, it is a fifth-generation family operated business.

Martinelli's has also produced a sparkling hard cider. They also have several other brands of juices. There is a street in Watsonville that bears the Martinelli name.
