= Bold Rock Hard Cider =

U.S. cider manufacturer

- Type: Regional Brand
- Industry: Craft Beverage
- Founded: 2012
- Founder: John Washburn, Brian Shanks
- Headquarters: Nellysford, Virginia, United States
- Number of locations: 2 Cideries: Nellysford, Virginia and Mills River, North Carolina
- Area served: 24-state distribution, East Coast & portions of midwest & Texas
- Products: Hard cider
- Production output: 80,000 US barrels (2019)
- Owner: Artisanal Brewing Ventures
- Website: boldrock.com

Bold Rock is a hard cider company headquartered in Nellysford, Virginia with additional locations in Charlottesville, Virginia, Crozet, Virginia and Mills River, North Carolina.

== History ==
It was founded by John Washburn and Brian Shanks in 2012. Washburn and Shanks started Bold Rock using only fresh-pressed Blue Ridge Mountain apples to ensure the best-tasting cider. The apples come from local orchards close to their two cideries. The craft ciders contain no additives and produce very limited waste, resulting in 85 percent of every apple becoming juice.

The company has won over 100 awards. The company has expanded into other beverages, including hard tea and hard lemonade, in a variety of flavors.

Bold Rock Hard Cider is distributed throughout Washington, D.C., Maryland, Delaware, Pennsylvania, Virginia, West Virginia, Tennessee, North Carolina, South Carolina and Georgia.
