= Stonewell Cider =

Craft brewery in Ireland

Nohoval Drinks Company Limited
- Trade name: Stonewell Cider; Finnbarra Cider
- Type: Private
- Industry: Drinks industry
- Founded: 2010; 16 years ago in Nohoval, County Cork, Ireland
- Founder: Daniel Emerson; Geraldine Emerson
- Area served: Europe
- Products: Cider
- Website: stonewellcider.com

The Nohoval Drinks Company, trading in Ireland as Stonewell Cider and internationally as Finnbarra Cider, is a craft cider producer founded in the village of Nohoval, County Cork in Ireland in 2010 by husband and wife Daniel and Géraldine Emerson. Stonewell Cider is distributed by Classic Drinks in Ireland. Though their share of the Irish cider market is small (0.5%), the country is the biggest cider-consumer per capita, and Stonewell is the largest artisan drinks maker in the country.

== History ==
Inspired by Géraldine's father, a wine-maker from the Orleanais province in France, the couple decided to pursue full time traditional cider-making in 2010. In their first year, Stonewell produced 6,000 litres of cider. By 2011, Emerson had tripled production, and tripled it again in 2012. In 2012, Daniel Emerson announced a deal to distribute in Italy via Qualitá Club.

The company pressed over 750 tonnes of apples in 2015, resulting in the production of 350,000 litres of cider. The following year the company secured a five-year contract to have its products distributed across France by a subsidiary of Carlsberg; the total volume ordered for the first three years of the deal was equal to Nohoval's total output in 2015.

Post Covid, Stonewell Cider continues to gain popularity. With a product range of 7, including Medium Dry, Dry, 0%, Rós (apple & rhubarb), Sting (apple & botanicals) and Cask (Cider aged in whiskey barrels), it continues to be the cider of choice for many.

2025 saw the release of a limited edition Stonewell Reserve, a blend of grape and apple using grape musk from Geraldine Emersons family vineyard.

== Awards ==
Stonewell has won over 30 awards since its foundation. including Supreme Champion of the 2016 Blas na hÉireann awards, Gold Trophy Winner at the International Cider Awards in 2024 and Premium Champion at SISGA in 2023.
