= K (cider) =

Cider made by C&C Group plc

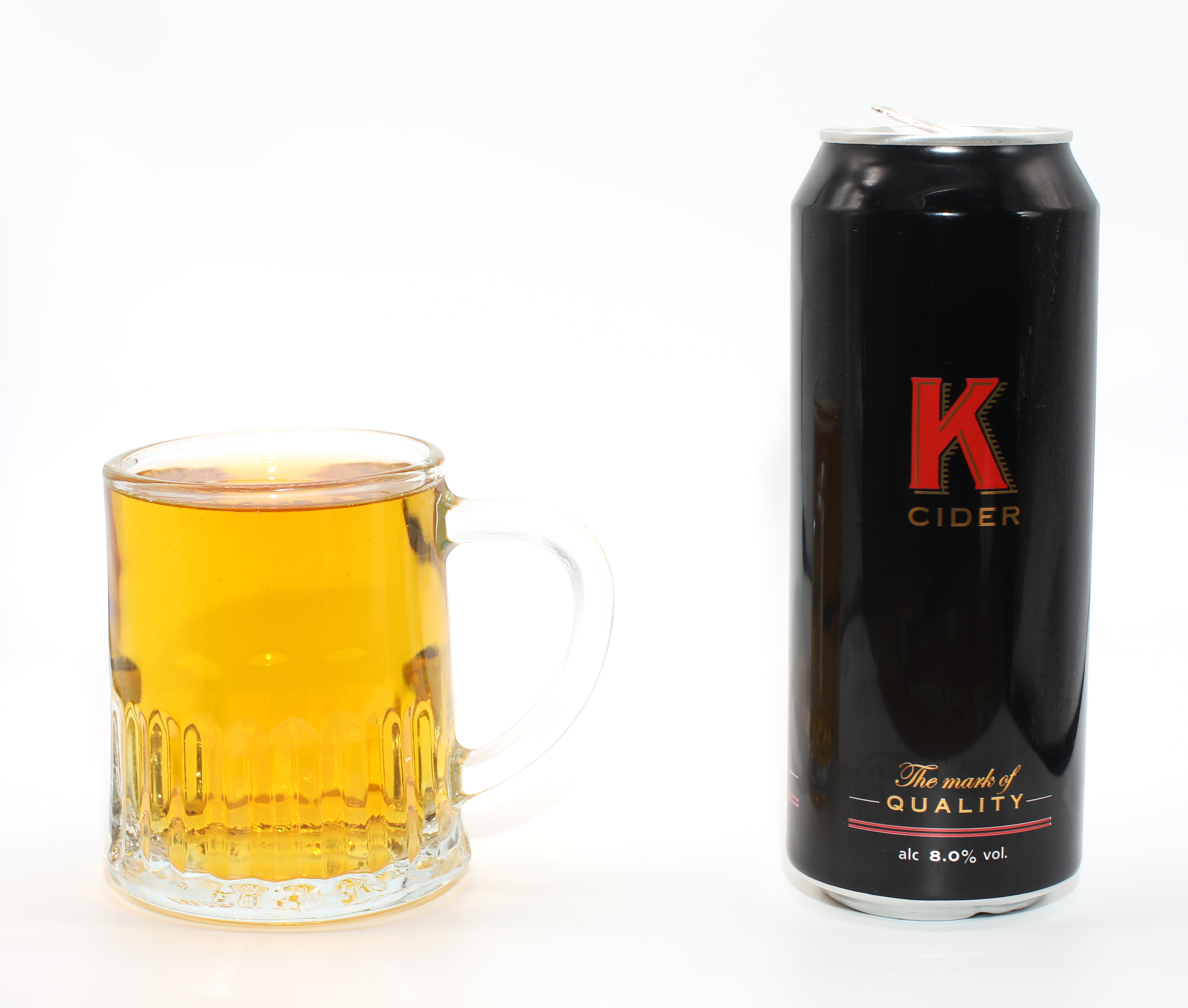
The cider and an example of a K cider can

K is a cider manufactured and distributed by C&C Group plc.

== In the UK ==
Advertised under the slogan 'The Mark of Quality', the canned version available in the UK was initially 8.4% ABV. At one time, two bottled versions were available, one at 8.4% and the "K6" at 6.3%. The price of the 500 ml can was £1.39. As of 2017, the cans' ABV was reduced to 8%, and had a reduced retail price of £1.09. As of 2020, its ABV was reduced yet again to 7.5%.

== In the U.S. ==
A bottled version was available in the U.S. at 6.9% ABV. As of 2010, K is no longer available in the U.S. with the exception of special orders.

== The look ==
Cans and bottles of K have a distinctive trade dress, coloured black with a scarlet K in the centre of the container.
