= H. P. Bulmer =

British cider-making company

H P Bulmer Limited
- Company type: Subsidiary
- Industry: Alcoholic beverages
- Founded: 1887
- Founder: H. P. Bulmer
- Headquarters: Hereford, England
- Area served: Worldwide
- Products: Cider
- Owner: Heineken N.V.
- Website: bulmers.com

H P Bulmer Limited, trading as Bulmers, is a cider-making company founded in 1887 in Hereford, England.

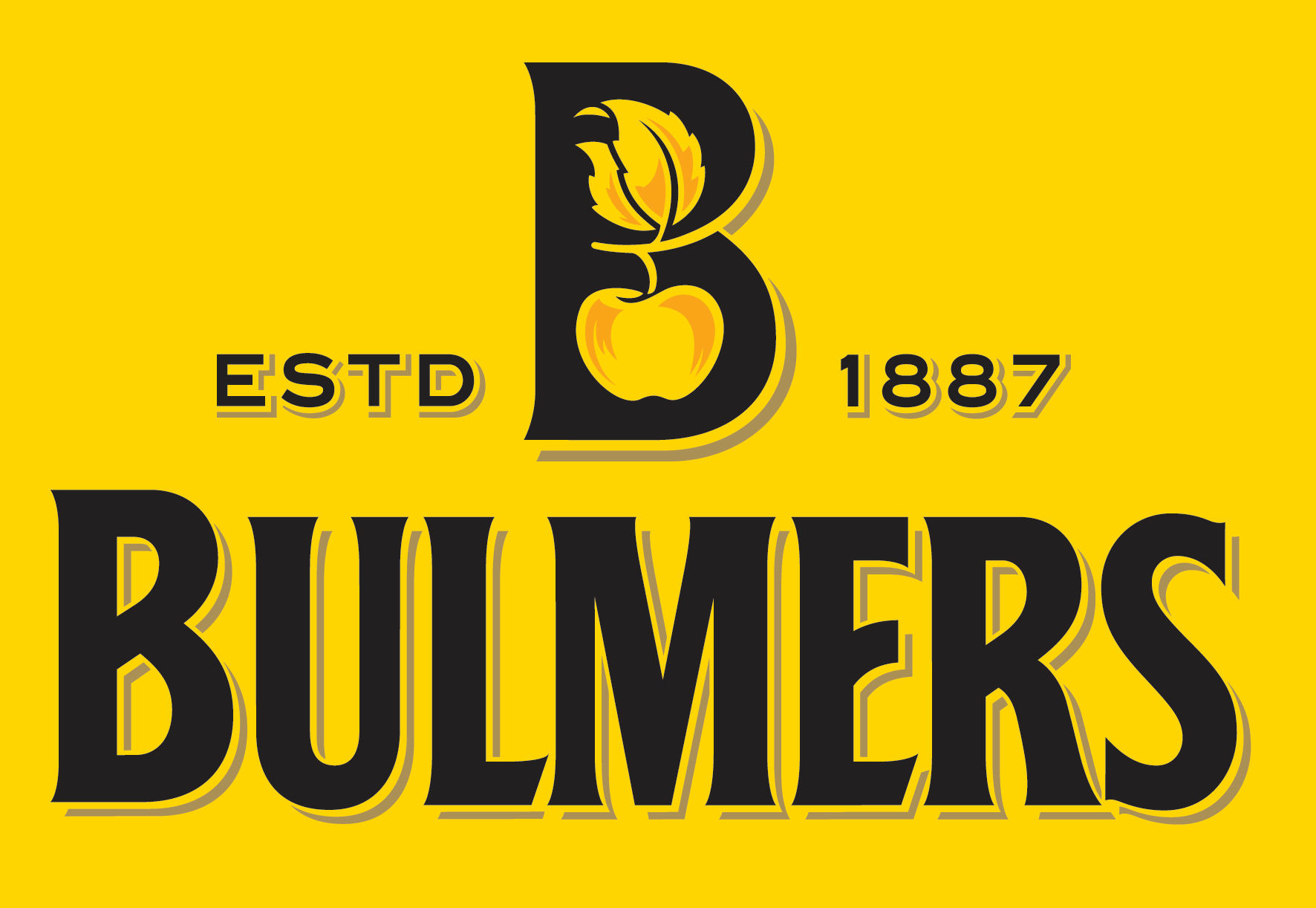
Bulmers Cider Logo 2011

The company's two principal brands are its own Bulmers cider, which is sold worldwide, and Strongbow, which is sold across Europe, the US & Canada, Oceania and East Asia. The company is owned by Heineken N.V. H. P. Bulmer makes 65% of the five hundred million litres of cider sold annually in the United Kingdom and the bulk of the UK's cider exports. The firm's primary competitor is the Irish C&C Group with its Magners brand (which also holds the licence to the Bulmers brand name in Ireland only).

== History ==
=== Formation ===
The founder was Henry Percival "Percy" Bulmer, the twenty-year-old son of the rector at Credenhill, the Reverend Charles H. Bulmer and his wife Mary. He is said to have taken his mother's advice to make a career in food or drink, "because neither ever go out of fashion".

Using apples from the orchard at his father's rectory and an old stone press on the farm next door, Percy Bulmer made the first cider, upon which the family fortune would be made.

In 1889, on leaving King's College, Cambridge, his elder brother Fred (Edward Frederick Bulmer), turned down the offer of a post as tutor to the children of the King of Siam to join Percy in his fledgling cider business.

With a £1,760 loan from their father, the brothers bought an 8 acres (3.2 ha) field just outside the city and built their first cider mill. It was little more than a barn compared to the huge modern stainless-steel computer-controlled cider-making plant that has grown up on a 75 acres (30.4 ha) site nearby.

Cider-making was then an unpredictable activity, the natural fermentation process being achieved by yeast contained within apples; this meant that the cider often became sour. It was a college friend of Fred's, Dr Herbert Durham, who, in the 1890s, isolated a wild yeast to create the first pure cider yeast culture, which would ensure that fermentations were consistent. This was the start of commercial cider-making.

Bulmers was first granted the Royal Warrant in 1911 and continues today as Cider Maker to His Majesty the King. It was incorporated as a private company on 27 June 1918. It described its cider as "The White Wine of England".

Percy Bulmer died in 1919, aged 52.

Strongbow was brought in from 1960.

=== Public company ===
Shares were offered in the company on the Stock Exchange on 7 December 1970. At this point, it was the world's largest producer of cider.

== 21st century ==
In 2003, the company was bought for £278 million by Scottish & Newcastle (S&N) with the loss of some 200 jobs initially. In 2008, S&N was bought for £7.8 billion by the Heineken group. Its Australia and New Zealand business interests were sold to Australian brewer Foster's. Bulmers now survives only as a brand name, with operations in Hereford scaled back considerably, principally producing cider. Apart from the 200 initial mainly administrative jobs lost in 2003 after the initial S&N merger, more losses were announced in 2008 when bottling ceased, although after the last batch of 65 job cuts it was pledged that there would be site production and investment of around £7.5m, including a second can line to be installed by 2011.

In 2006, the company relaunched Bulmers Original in the UK, a premium packaged cider aimed at the "served over ice" market, which grew in popularity. Bulmers Original is a 4.5% ABV cider sold primarily in pint (568 ml) bottles, but also on draught, in 1 litre bottles and in a 500 ml can. In 2007, the Bulmers range was joined by Bulmers Pear cider, and in Spring 2008 by Bulmers Light, with the same ABV as the Original but with 30% fewer calories. However, this was delisted a year later.

Amongst the other brands produced by Bulmers is Jacques, a 5.5% ABV cider. This is available in Fruit De Bois (cider with cherry, raspberry and blackcurrant flavours) and Jacques Orchard Fruits, launched in 2008.

In 2010, a limited edition Summer Blend of Bulmers was made, combining apple and pear flavours, and another limited-edition version of Bulmers using specially selected red Katy Apples which are allowed to fully ripen in the orchards before harvesting, named Red Apple.

In 2011, Bulmer's released the limited edition Crisp Blend, made from sharper tasting apples, delivering a crisp and slightly drier flavour than the Original. Bulmers also rebranded themselves with a new look and new bottles.

The Bulmers naming tradition dates back to the early 1900s (at the time these were Bulmers 1 through to 8). They also number-coded the different varieties, with Original No.9, Pear No.10 and Crisp Blend No.15. At the same time, No.17, Red Berry and Lime, was introduced

As of 2022, the main Bulmers brand has largely fallen out of favour with the public, with only the Original and Red Berry and Lime flavours available in the UK.

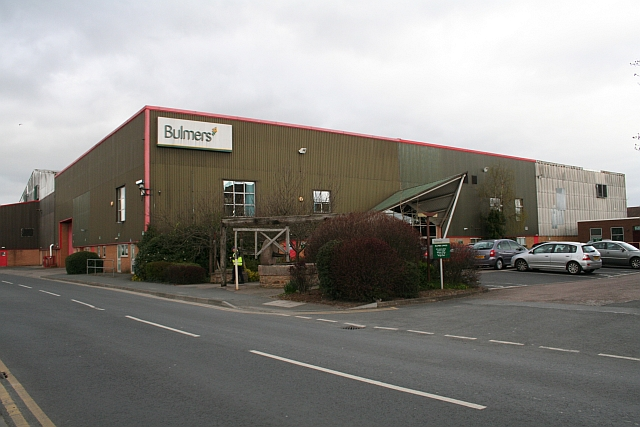
Bulmer's factory in Hereford

== Structure ==
Apples for the cider are grown in England and France. In 2014, it was reported that Bulmers takes 90 per cent of its apples from orchards in Herefordshire.

== Brands ==
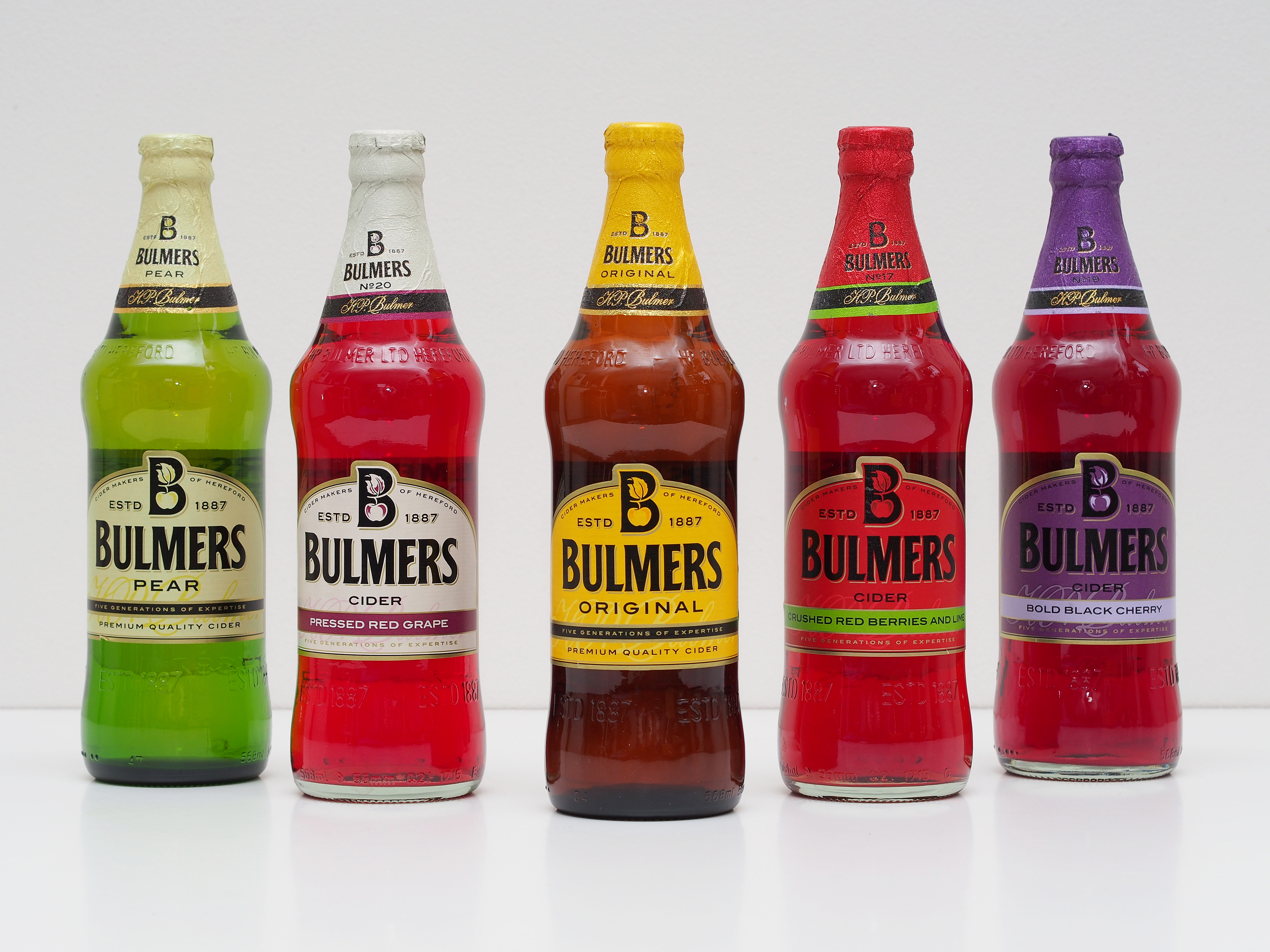
Sample set of Bulmers ciders

- Bulmers
- Strongbow
- Scrumpy Jack
- Woodpecker Cider
- Inch's
- Orchard Thieves
- Orchard Pig
- Jacques Cider with fruit
- Old Mout Cider
- Pomagne
- Blind Pig, whiskey- and rum-flavoured ciders

== See also ==
- List of cider brands
