= Strongbow (cider) =

Brand of cider

- Type: Cider
- Manufacturer: H. P. Bulmer (UK); Stassen (Europe); Carlton & United Breweries (Australia)
- Distributor: Heineken N.V. Carlton & United Breweries (Australia)
- Origin: United Kingdom
- Introduced: 1960; 66 years ago
- Alcohol by volume: 4.5–6.0%
- Colour: Golden yellow
- Flavour: Initial strong 'cidery' flavour from the fermented bittersweet juice with a hint of 'appliness' or cooked apple coming from the culinary fruit.
- Variants: Gold (dry) (excluding USA); Dark Fruit; Cherry Blossom; Cloudy Apple; Gold Apple; Honey; Red Berry; Elderflower; Ginger (USA only)
- Website: strongbow.com

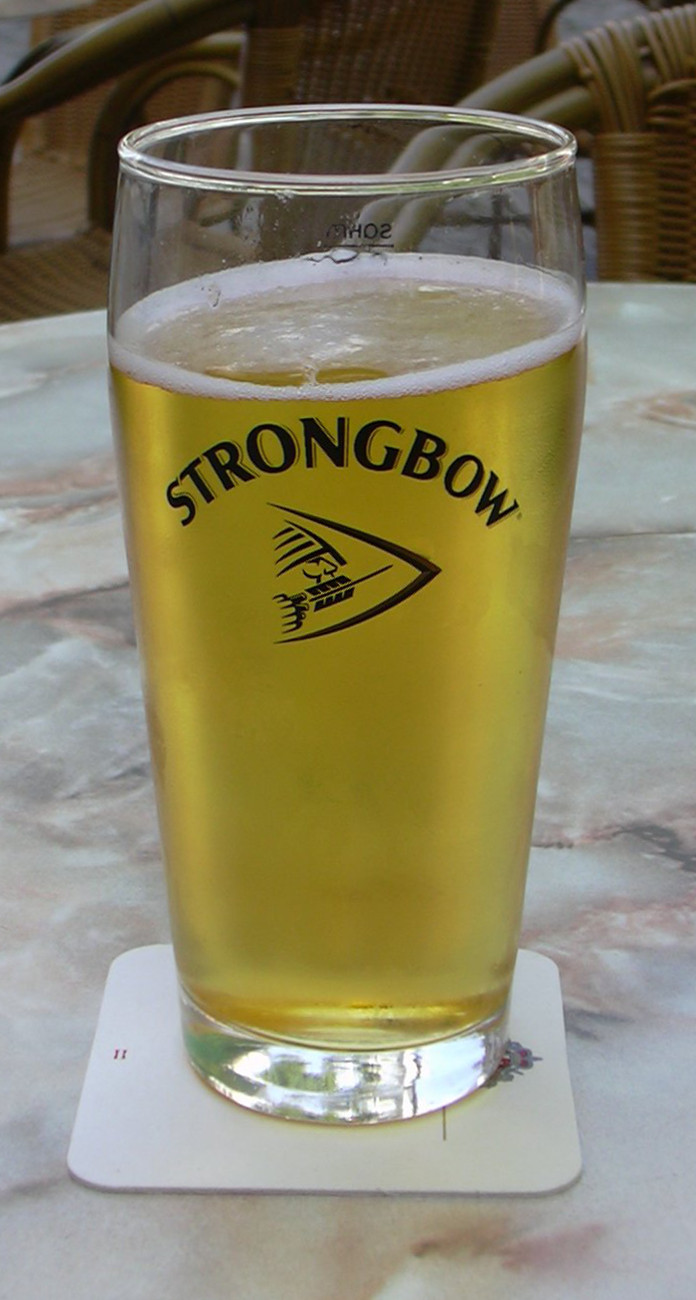
Draught Strongbow in a branded pint glass

Strongbow is a dry cider produced by H. P. Bulmer in the United Kingdom since 1960. Strongbow is the world's leading cider with a 15 per cent volume share of the global cider market and a 29 per cent volume share of the UK cider market. Bulmer's is a subsidiary of Heineken N.V., the multinational Dutch brewer who also own the sustainable cider brand Inch's.

Strongbow was the highest selling cider in Australia and was the second-highest selling cider in North America as of 2012. Belgian-produced Strongbow Gold was introduced in Europe in response to cider's growing popularity on the continent in 2011.

The majority of Strongbow is produced at Bulmer's Hereford plant, although regional variations are also produced at Heineken's cider mill in Belgium and in Australia.

== History ==
Former product logo

Strongbow was launched in the United Kingdom by H. P. Bulmer in 1960. Bulmer named the cider after "one of England's greatest knights" Richard de Clare, whose nickname "Strongbow" was believed to be derived from his heavy reliance on archers during his campaigns in Ireland. However, this theory is unlikely to be true because de Clare's father, Gilbert de Clare, was originally known as "Strongbow", which suggests that Richard's nickname was actually inherited from his father. It was initially marketed as "the strong cider for men".

By 1970, it was the second-highest selling cider in the world after its Bulmer's stablemate Woodpecker. By 2001, Strongbow was among the top ten drinks by sales in pubs and bars in England and Wales.

In 2003, Bulmers was purchased by Scottish & Newcastle, who in turn were taken over by Heineken in 2008. In January 2011, Heineken announced their intention to take the Strongbow brand global.

Heineken acquired the rights to Strongbow in Australia from Asahi in 2020.

== Production methods ==
Now-discontinued original United States bottled version.

In the United Kingdom, Strongbow is a blend of bitter-sweet cider and culinary apples, with 50 different varieties of apple used. The apples are grown in England, although imports from France are also used when harvests are poor. It is mass-produced using modern methods and contains apple concentrate and sugar. It is fermented with a controlled yeast strain. Strongbow in the UK does not contain any artificial sweeteners, flavourings or colouring. The Bulmers Strongbow vat is the largest alcoholic container in the world, with a capacity of 1.5 million gallons (6.8 million litres).

== Variations ==
In the UK, Strongbow is available on draught at 4.5% ABV and in cans and bottles at 4.5% ABV. In 2012, the UK packaged versions were reduced from 5.3% ABV to 5.0% ABV.

Strongbow Gold is the variant available in mainland Europe and is available only in bottles. It was launched in May 2012, and its major markets include Italy and Hungary. It is 5% ABV and designed to be served over ice. It is over 50% apple juice, making it a similar product to Magners and Stella Cidre. It also contains glucose syrup, glucose-fructose syrup, food acidifier: malic acid, anti-oxidant: sulphur dioxide, the colouring agent: burned sugar. It is made in Belgium at Heineken's Stassen plant. However, the version of Strongbow Gold Apple available in Slovakia contains only 25% apple juice; in that version the colouring is E150a caramel.

Strongbow is exported to numerous overseas markets. Sleeman Breweries took over the distribution rights for Canada in 2001, and is the fifth highest selling cider in the United States, where it was imported by Vermont Hard Cider until August 2012, when Heineken regained the rights. It was launched into the Australian market in 1970, and today still remains as Australia's most popular cider. Strongbow is available in seven varieties in Australia: Dry, Sweet, Original (formerly sold as "Draught"), Lower Carb (a low carbohydrate variety), Pear, Blossom Rosé and Hard Cider (8.2%). Foster's Group purchased the Strongbow brand in Australia in 2003, and continues to produce, distribute & market the brand. They were themselves purchased by SABMiller in 2011 before being bought out by Anheuser-Busch InBev in 2017. It is confirmed that in the Australian market, the brand will be purchased by Asahi Breweries in June 2020. Carlton & United Breweries, currently have the rights to Strongbow in Australia.

In 2013, Heineken launched "Strongbow Dark Fruit" in the UK, which contains blackcurrant and blackberry juices. 2015 saw the introduction of "Cloudy Apple", a scrumpy version of the cider. In 2020, "Strongbow Rosé", a rosé-style cider, was introduced. In 2023, to coincide with another rebrand, a tropical flavour was introduced, containing mango and pineapple. In 2024, a "Zest" flavour (containing orange, lemon and lime) and a strawberry flavour were introduced.

In 2014 in the US, Heineken launched two new sweeter flavours, dubbed "Gold Apple" and "Honey & Apple". Strongbow subsequently discontinued the original dry cider Strongbow flavor in the USA. The move to discontinue the original dry cider recipe in the US and replace it with two sweeter varieties was criticized by some vocal customers, with comments related to the discontinuation appearing on various internet forums, the Strongbow Facebook page, and the USA Heineken Strongbow web page. However, in May 2018, Heineken announced that it would bring back the original dry cider to the United States in 16.9-ounce cans, which it did the following month.

In 2015 in the US, a variety pack was released, which includes the two existing flavors "Gold Apple" and "Honey & Apple" along with two additional flavors "Red Berries" and "Ginger." "Cherry Blossom" was introduced in 2016.

In 2022, a low-calorie variant, Strongbow Ultra, was introduced. The initial flavour of this variant, Dark Fruit, contained 95 calories per can, 30% fewer than the regular version of the Dark Fruit flavour. In 2023, Strongbow introduced an apple flavour to the range; the apple flavour contains 80 calories per can, 36% fewer than the Original flavour.

== Discontinued brand extensions ==
United States canned version

In the late 80s to early 90s Strongbow produced and marketed a double fermented cider "1080" – said to be its specific gravity.

The late 1990s briefly gave us Strongbow smooth – carbonated with nitrogen instead of carbon dioxide, so much smaller bubbles and a smooth, creamy texture.

Previously Strongbow White was available in Australia, which had a much higher alcohol content (8.5%). It ceased production sometime after 2000.

Strongbow Sirrus (5% ABV), was launched in summer 2005 to compete with C&C's Magners Irish Cider. Sirrus was formulated as a 'smooth' cider designed to be poured over ice, and was only available in bottles; it has since been discontinued.

In 2007, the company began trials of Strongbow On Ice, a competitor to other ciders that are served over ice. This uses a specially designed pump that creates a "head" of ice made from cider on the top of the pint. Trials were unsuccessful however, and the product was discontinued.

From 2007 to 2013 Strongbow in collaboration with Stassen SA sold a premium fruit-flavoured cider aimed at wine drinkers called Jacques Fruits des Bois/Jacques Fruit Cider. This was replaced by Strongbow Dark Fruit in 2013.

Strongbow Black (previously Strongbow Super) at 7.5% ABV, was delisted by Heineken in 2011 on social responsibility grounds.

In 2013, Strongbow briefly produced 'Strongbow Original' which was the same as is currently sold, rather having a matte can.

In 2014, "Strongbow Citrus Edge" was introduced, which contained lemon and lime. This was discontinued in 2017.

== Advertising ==
The original Norman archer logo was designed by the graphic artist Barney Bubbles. The "thudding arrows" have been a signature of the brand's television advertising since the 1960s. Towards the end of the advertisement, two arrows thud into a bar counter near a glass of Strongbow, or its bar pump.

Advertisements from 1998 to 2002 featured television and radio presenter Johnny Vaughan and the "live to loaf" line. The campaign focused on Vaughan's character, who was always finding new ways to get the most out of life with the minimum effort. Vaughan was credited by Bulmers with giving credibility to the Strongbow brand among the key 18 to 24-year-old group. Between 1998 and 2000 Strongbow sales rose by 30 per cent.

In 2010, TV adverts in the UK were based on the "medal ceremony" scene at the end of the film Star Wars: Episode IV – A New Hope (1977): three men walk down an aisle flanked by large numbers of men; step up a raised podium at the far end; and receive a reward – a pint of Strongbow – for their "heroic deeds" (i.e.: performing their ordinary jobs). Adverts in 2012, showed fanciful representations of normal situations (goalkeeping, potting a black ball, best man's speech) where those seen in the advert would be next seen drinking Strongbow having "earnt it" for accomplishing such situations. The latest advert depicts a duplex-style apple orchard divided between bitter and sweet reflecting Strongbow being "bittersweet by nature".

In 2015, Strongbow began its "Cider at its Bestest" campaign in the US, featuring actor Patrick Stewart.

The most recent campaigns for Strongbow include one for the Strongbow Ultra variant which incorporates the theme "Drink the G.O.A.T." and a rebrand advert showing a fancy dress party with the attendants wearing very silly costumes (i.e. a sardine can).

=== Sponsorship ===
Strongbow were official shirt sponsors of Edinburgh football club Heart of Midlothian from 1992–2002. Strongbow also sponsored Leeds United Football Club from 2000–2003. Strongbow reputedly paid £3 million a year for the rights.

== See also ==
- Cider in the United Kingdom
