= Pomagne =

Brand of cider produced by H. P. Bulmer

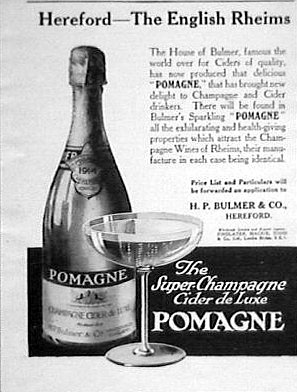
Pomagne print advertisement, 1918

Pomagne was a brand of cider produced by Bulmers in the Herefordshire, England. It was first marketed in 1906 under the name "Cider De Luxe". In 1916, it was renamed Pomagne.

It was originally produced by the méthode champenoise using only the juice from the first pressing.

Bulmers marketed Pomagne as "champagne cider" until Bollinger took it to court over the use of the term "champagne" in 1974. Bulmers won the case, but stopped using the méthode champenoise in 1975 and changed to making Pomagne by bulk fermentation in a 6,000-gallon tank.

The drink was referenced in the BBC sitcom The Royle Family, along with the Snowball.

Pomagne was discontinued at some point prior to 2013, at which time Bulmers stated it was not planning to reintroduce the drink.
