= Scrumpy Jack =

English cider brand

Scrumpy Jack is a brand of dry cider, 6% alcohol by volume (ABV), produced in England. Previously it was of a stronger ABV of 7.5%, but this was changed some years ago due to taxes and licensing. It is currently produced in Hereford by H. P. Bulmer, a subsidiary of Heineken International. Scrumpy Jack is also produced under licence in Devon by Czk1.

It was first produced in 1727 by Symonds Cider and English Wine Company of Stoke Lacy. The family firm was taken over by Greenall Whitley in 1984 and sold to Bulmers in 1989.

Exports of Scrumpy Jack began to Ireland in 1990, Spain in 1991 and Sweden in 1992. In 2000, sales in the United Kingdom exceeded 200 million litres. The brand was also publicised by Symonds' official sponsorship of the England national rugby union team in the mid-1990s, the English cricket team, and the Cricket World Cup in 1999. The original Stoke Lacey plant closed in 2000.
