= Woodpecker Cider =

Brand of cider

Woodpecker Cider is a sweet cider originally made in 1894 by Percy Bulmer in Herefordshire and today brewed by H. P. Bulmer.

Woodpecker is noted for a lower alcohol content than most other ciders as well as for its sweet taste. It is available in pubs and bars and is sold in bottles or cans. The brand's logo is the European green woodpecker, which is depicted against a bright red background on the cider cans and on most other packaging.

The brand appears to be in a state of managed decline, with sales having dropped by almost one third since 2001.
