= List of cideries in the United States =

In the United States, the definition of cider can be more broadly defined than in Europe, specifically Ireland and the UK. There are two types of cider: one being the traditional fermented product, called hard cider, and the second sweet or soft cider. Sparkling cider is also sometimes used as a nonalcoholic version of champagne. Within the broad 'hard cider' category, there are a number of subcategories – Modern Cider – primarily made with culinary apples, Heritage Cider – primarily made with cider specific fruit, Traditional Cider – made in the style of English or French cider, and Fruit Cider – with non-pomme fruits or juice added. There are additional categories such as hopped cider, botanical cider, rose cider, spiced cider, wood-aged cider, sour cider, ice cider, New England style cider, and specialty or unlimited cider.

== Cideries by state ==
=== Alabama ===
- Avondale Brewing Company – Birmingham
- Dixie Southern Cidery – Florence
- Red Clay Brewing Company – Opelika

=== Alaska ===
- Alaska Ciderworks and Meadery – Talkeetna
- Alaska Legends Cider & Wine – Ketchikan
- Arctic Roots Cider – No Physical Location
- Black Spruce Brewing Company – Fairbanks
- Bear Creek Winery – Homer
- Double Shovel Cider Co. – Anchorage
- Latitude 65 Brewing Company Company – Fairbanks
- Sweetgale Meadworks & Cider House – Homer
- Three Northmen Tasting Room - Mead Cider Hard Soda – Haines

=== Arizona ===
- Arizona Mead Company – Chandler
- Bawker Bawker Cider House – Tucson
- Cider Corps – Meza
- Crush Craft Cider Company – Tempe
- Headbanger Cider – Desert Rock Winery – Scottsdale
- Stoic Cider – Prescott
- Superstition Meadery – Prescott, Phoenix
- The Meading Room – Sonoita

=== Arkansas ===
- Black Apple Hard Cider – Bentonville, Springdale

=== California ===
- 101 Cider House – Westlake Village
- Ace Cider – Sebastopol
- AppleGarden Farm – Petaluma
- Bite Hard Cider – CLOSED
- Bonny Doon Vineyard – Davenport
- Bristol's Cider House – Atascadero
- Brooks Dry Cider – San Francisco
- Calico Cidery – Julian
- California Cider Company – Sebastopol
- Casa Dumetz Wines – Los Alamos
- Cider Brothers – Walnut Creek
- Common Cider Company – Auburn
- Coturri Winery – Glen Ellen
- Crispin Cider Company – Colfax
- Crooked City Cider – CLOSED
- Devoto Orchards Cider - CLOSED
- Dreamcôte Wine Co. – Los Olivos
- Drew Family Cellars – Elk
- Far West Cider – Richmond
- Foxcraft Hard Cider – CLOSED
- Goat Rock Cider Co – Healdsburg
- Golden State Cider – Graton
- Gowan's Heirloom Ciders – Philo
- Guthrie CiderWorks – San Diego
- Hemly Cider – Courtland
- Hidden Star Orchards – Lodi
- Honest Abe Cidery – Carson
- Horse & Plow – Sebastopol
- Humboldt Cider Company – Eureka
- Indigeny Reserve – Sonora
- Jack Russell Farm Brewery – Camino
- Jean Marie Cidery – Paso Robles
- Julian Ciderworks – Julian
- Julian Hard Cider – Julian
- Krazy Farm Cider Co. – Aptos
- Lassen Traditional Cider – Chico
- Meraki Cider – Pismo Beach
- Mission-Trail Cider Company – Bradley
- Newtopia Cyder – San Diego
- Philo Apple Farm – Philo
- Ratel Cider – Monterey
- Red Branch Cider & Brewing Company – Sunnyvale
- Redwood Coast Cider – CLOSED
- Reef Points Hard Cider – Cayucos
- Rider Ranch Ciderworks – CLOSED
- Santa Cruz Cider Company – Santa Cruz
- Scar of the Sea – Santa Maria
- See Canyon Hard Cider – San Luis Obispo
- Serpentine Cider – San Diego
- Sierra Cider – Mariposa
- Snow-Line Orchard – Yucaipa
- Sonoma Cider – CLOSED
- Soquel Cider – Soquel
- South City Cider – CLOSED
- Specific Gravity Cider – CLOSED
- Surf City Cider – Felton
- Sutton Cellars – San Francisco
- Tag + Jug Cider Co. – San Francisco
- The Apiary Ciderworks & Meadery – Carpinteria
- Three Thinkers Cider – Sierraville
- Tilted Shed Ciderworks – Windsor
- Tin City Cider – Paso Robles
- Troy Cider – CLOSED
- Turquoise Barn Cider – Ramona
- Twisted Horn Mead & Cider – Vista
- Two Rivers Cider Co. – Sacramento
- Wildcide Hard Cider – San Jose
- Wrangletown Cider Company – Arcata

=== Colorado ===
- Apple Valley Cider Company – Penrose
- Big B's Hard Cider – Hotchkiss
- Branch Out Cider – Fort Collins
- C Squared Ciders – Denver
- Clear Fork Cider – Denver
- Climb Hard Cider Co. – Loveland
- Colorado Cider Company – Denver
- Colorado Common Hard Cider – Colorado Springs
- Fenceline Cider – Durango
- Haykin Family Cider – Aurora
- Ice Cave Cider House – Monument
- Jack Rabbit Hill – Hotchkiss
- Snow Capped Cider – Cedaredge
- St. Vrain Cidery – Longmont
- Stem Ciders – Denver
- Summit Hard Cider – Fort Collins
- Talbott's Cider Company – Palisade
- The Infinite Monkey Theorem – Denver
- The Old Mine Cidery & Brewpub – Erie
- Wild Cider – Firestone

=== Connecticut ===
- Averill Farm – Washington Depot
- B.F. Clyde's Cider Mill – Mystic
- Bishop's Orchards Winery – Guilford
- Bushy Hill Cidery – Granby
- Crazy Cock Cider – Stafford Springs
- Hogan's Cider Mill – Burlington
- Holmberg Orchards & Winery – Gales Ferry
- Lyman Orchard – Middlefield
- New England Cider Company – Wallingford
- Spoke + Spy Ciderworks – Middletown
- Tree House Orchard & Farm Fermentory – Woodstock
- Yankee Cider Company – East Haddam

=== Delaware ===
- Liquid Alchemy Beverages – Wilmington
- Rebel Seed Cidery – Marydel
- The Brimming Horn Meadery – Milton
- Wilmington Brew Works – Wilmington

=== Florida ===
- 3 Daughters Brewing – St. Petersburg
- 3 Keys Brewery and Eatery – Bradenton
- Accomplice Brewery & Ciderworks – West Palm Beach
- Bone Sack Cider Company – St. Cloud
- Broski Ciderworks – Pompano Beach
- Caribé Tropical Hard Cider – Florida Beer Co. – Canaveral
- Cigar City Cider & Mead – Tampa
- Congaree and Penn – Farm Cider – Jacksonville
- Green Bench Mead & Cider – St. Petersburg
- Keel Farms Agrarian Ales + Ciders – Plant City
- Khoffner Brewery & Cidery – Fort Lauderdale
- Pierced Ciderworks – Fort Pierce
- Pedaler's Hard Cider – Quantum Leap Winery – Orlando

=== Georgia ===
- Atlanta Hard Cider Company – Marietta
- Mercier Orchards – Blue Ridge
- Treehorn Cider – Marietta
- Urban Tree Cidery – Atlanta

=== Hawaii ===
- Paradise Ciders – Honolulu

=== Idaho ===
- Cedar Draw Cider – Buhl
- Edge Brewing Company – Boise
- Highpoint Cider – Victor
- Meriwether Cider Company – Garden City, Boise
- North Idaho Cider – Hayden
- Stack Rock Cidery – Boise

=== Illinois ===
- 2 Fools Cider – Naperville
- Apple Knocker Hard Cider – Owl Creek Vineyard – Cobden
- Broken Brix – St. Charles
- Eckert's Cider Shed – Belleville
- Eris Brewery and Cider House – Chicago
- Farmheads Cider Farm – Evanston
- Jonasmack Hard Cider – Malta
- Kuipers Hard Cider – Maple Park
- Overgrown Orchard – Chicago
- Prima Cider – Long Grove
- Right Bee Cider – Chicago
- Stiffy's Hard Cider – Land of Lincoln Winery – Peoria
- The Northman – Chicago
- Von Jakob Winery & Brewery – Alto Pass

=== Indiana ===
- Aftermath Cidery & Winery – Valparaiso
- Ambrosia Orchard, Cidery, and Meadery – Hoagland
- Ash & Elm Cider Co. – Indianapolis
- Beanblossom Hard Cider – Oliver Winery – Bloomington
- Friendly Beasts Cider Company – Bloomington
- Kekionga Cider Company – Fort Wayne
- McClure's Orchard & Winery – Peru
- Misbeehavin' Meads – Valparaiso
- New Day Craft Mead & Cider – Indianapolis
- Sin City Cider – Sycamore Winery – West Terre Haute
- Urban Apples - Westfield

=== Iowa ===
- BridgeHouse Cider LLC – Long Grove
- Convergence CiderWorks – Decorah
- Deal's Orchard Hard Cider – Jefferson
- Ditmar's Orchard & Vineyard – Council Bluffs
- Empty Nest Winery – Waukon
- Fishback & Stephenson Cider House – Fairfield
- Ghost Pig – Soldier Creek Winery – Fort Dodge
- Jacked Up Hard Cider – Crimson Sunset Cidery – Cascade
- Jefferson County Ciderworks – Fairfield
- Penoach Vineyard and Winery – Adel
- Sacrilegious Ciderworks – Glenwood
- Sutliff Cider Company – Lisbon
- Wilson's Orchard Hard Cider – Iowa City
- Winterset Cidery – Winterset

=== Kansas ===
- Bodine Wine Company – Wamego
- Dave & Dani Craft Cider – Manhattan
- KC Wine Co – Olathe
- Louisburg Cider Mill – Louisburg
- Meadowlark Farm Orchard & Cidery – Rose Hill
- Stone Pillar Vineyard & Winery – Olathe
- Trivedi Wine LLC – Lawrence
- Twin Rivers Winery and Gourmet Shoppe – Emporia
- White Crow Cider Company – Wichita

=== Kentucky ===
- Country Boy Brewing – Georgetown, Lexington
- Pivot Brewing Company – Lexington
- The Vault – Bum Ditty Hard Cider – Harrodsburg
- Wise Bird Cider Co. – Lexington

=== Louisiana ===
- Broad Street Cider – New Orleans
- Kingfish Cider – Jefferson

=== Maine ===
- Absolem Cider Company – Winthrop
- After Harvest Cider Company – Acton
- Après – Portland
- Ayuh Cidah – Farmington
- Bent Bough Cider – Newburgh Center
- Cornish Cider Company – Cornish
- Fogtown Brewing Company – Ellsworth
- Freedom's Edge Cider – Albion
- Kennebec Cider Company – Winthrop
- Norumbega Cidery – New Gloucester
- Orchard Girls Cidery – Kingsfield
- Portersfield Cider – Pownal
- Ricker Hill Mainiac Hard Cider – Turner
- Rocky Ground Cider – Newburgh
- Stone Tree Farm & Cidery – Unity
- Sweetgrass Farm Winery and Distillery – Union
- Tin Top Cider Co. – Alna
- Urban Farm Fermentory & Gruit Brewing Co. – Portland
- Whaleback Farm Cider – Lincolnville
- Winterport Winery – Winterport

=== Maryland ===
- Branch Bender Cidery – Accident
- Chesapeake Cider Co. – Baltimore
- Distillery Lane Ciderworks – Jefferson
- Doc Waters Cidery – Germantown
- Faulkner Branch Cidery & Distilling Co. – Federalsburg
- Free State Ciders – Great Mills
- Great Shoals Winery – St. Michaels
- Red Shedman Farm Brewery – Mount Airy
- Two Story Chimney Ciderworks – Laytonsville
- Willow Oaks Craft Cider – Middletown
- (see also: Charm City Meadworks – Baltimore and Mobtown Fermentation – Lutherville-Timonium)

=== Massachusetts ===
- Artifact Cider Project – Florence, Cambridge
- Bear Swamp Orchard and Cidery – Ashfield
- Berkshire Cider Project – North Adams
- Bolton Beer Works – Bolton
- Carlson Orchards, Inc – Harvard
- Carr's Ciderhouse – Hadley
- Cider Hill Cellars – Amesbury
- Common Ground Ciderworks – North Brookfield
- Downeast Cider House – East Boston
- Easthampton Cider Project – Palmer
- Far From The Tree – Salem
- Green River Ambrosia – Greenfield
- Headwater Cider – Hawley
- High Limb Hard Cider – Plymouth
- Honey Pot Hill Orchards – Stow
- House Bear Brewing – Newburyport
- JMASH Ciderhouse – Hilltop Orchards – Richmond
- Lookout Farm – Belkin Farm – Natick
- Muse Cider Bar – Haydenville
- New Salem Cider – New Salem
- Outlook Farm Ciderhouse – Westhampton
- Pony Shack Cider – Boxborough
- Ragged Hill Cider Company – West Brookfield
- Red Apple Farm – Brew Barn & Cidery – Phillipston
- Russell Orchards – Ipswich
- Shoal Hope Ciderworks – Hyannis
- Stoneybrook Cider – South Hadley
- Stormalong Cider – Millis-Cliquot, Sherborn
- West County Cider – Shelburne Falls

=== Michigan ===
- 45 North Vineyard & Winery – Lake Leelanau
- Acme Cider Co. – Ada
- Almar Orchards – Flushing
- Appleholic Cider Company – Leland
- B. Nektar Meadery – Ferndale
- Bee Well Meadery – Bellaire
- Bel Lago Winery – Cedar
- Bennett's Orchard – Ottawa Lake
- Big Belly Ciderworks – Empire
- bigLITTLE Wines – Suttons Bay
- Black Star Farms – Suttons Bay
- Blakes Hard Cider Co. – Armada
- Blustone Vineyards – Lake Leelanau
- Bowers Harbor Vineyards – Traverse City
- Cellar Brewing Company – Sparta
- Cellarmen's – Hazel Park
- Cherry Creek Cellars – Albion
- Cherry Republic – Traverse City
- Corey Lake Orchards – Three Rivers
- Country Mill Winery – Charlotte
- Crane's Pie Pantry – Fennville
- Douglas Valley – Manistee
- Eastman's Forgotten Ciders – Wheeler
- Farmhaus Cider Co. – Hudsonville
- Fenn Valley Vineyards – Fennville
- Fieldstone Hard Cider – Rochester
- Flint City Hard Cider Co. – Flint
- Forbidden Fruit Cider – Paw Paw
- Fourth Coast Ciderworks – Lake Orion
- Green Bird Cellars – Northport
- Husted's Farm Market – Kalamazoo
- J. Trees Cellars – Tecumseh
- JK's Farmhouse Ciders – Flushing
- Kuhnhenn Brewing Co. – Warren
- L.Mawby – Suttons Bay
- Lansing Brewing Company – Lansing
- Left Foot Charley – Traverse City
- Lehman's Orchards – Niles
- Mackinaw Trail Winery & Brewery – Petoskey
- McIntosh Cellars – South Haven
- Meckley's Cidery – Cement City
- Michigan Wine Company – Grandville
- Motor City Brewing Works – Detroit
- Nomad Cidery – Traverse City
- Northern Natural Cider House & Winery – Kaleva
- Northville Winery and Brewing Company – Northville
- Odd Brothers Craft Cider – Homer
- Ore Creek Craft Cider- Pinckney, MI
- Painted Turtle Hard Cider – Lowell
- Petoskey Brewing – Petoskey
- Phillips Ciders – St. Johns
- Pux Cider – Conkin
- Ridge Cider Co. – Grant
- Robinette Cellars – Grand Rapids
- Schaefer Cider Company – Conklin, Michigan
- Sierra Rose Ciders – Grand Rapids
- Sietsema Orchards – Ada
- Spicer Orchards Winery – Fenton
- St. Ambrose Cellars – Beulah
- St. Julian Winery – Paw Paw
- Starcut Ciders – Bellaire
- Suttons Bay Ciders – Suttons Bay
- Tandem Ciders – Suttons Bay, Traverse City
- Texas Corners Brewing Company – Kalamazoo
- The Merry-Hearted Cidery – Gladwin
- The Peoples Cider Co. – Grand Rapids
- Townline Ciderworks – Williamsburg
- Twisted Roots Cider – Rogers City
- Two K Farms – Suttons Bay, Michigan
- Uncle John's – St. Johns
- Vander Mill – Grand Rapids
- Virtue Cider – Fennville
- Wiard's Orchards & Country Fair– Ypsilanti, Michigan
- Winery at Black Star Farms – Suttons Bay, Michigan
- Yates Cider Mill – Rochester Hills, Michigan

=== Minnesota ===
- 1910 Sip House – Battle Lake
- Brookview Winery – Milaca
- Duluth Cider – Duluth
- Falconer's Lumberjack Hard Cider – Red Wing
- Harbo Cider – Lake Crystal
- Hoch Orchard Hard Cider – La Crescent
- Keepsake Cidery – Dundas
- Loon Juice – Spring Valley
- Milk & Honey Ciders – St. Joseph
- Millner Heritage Winery & Cidery – Kimball
- Minneapolis Cider Company – Minneapolis
- Minnesota Harvest Craft Cider – Jordan
- Montgomery Harvest Premium Cider & Wine – Montgomery
- Number 12 Cider – Minneapolis
- Sawtooth Mountain Cider House – North Shore Winery – Lutsen
- Sociable Cider Werks – Minneapolis
- Sweetland Orchard – Webster
- Thor's Hard Cider – Stillwater
- Urban Forage Winery and Cider House – Minneapolis
- Wild State Cider – Duluth
- Woodlore Cider – Brainerd
- Yellow Belly Cider – Mora

=== Mississippi ===
- Backwater Cider Company – Jackson

=== Missouri ===
- Black Bear Cider Co. – St. Louis
- Brick River Cider – St. Louis
- Calibration Brewery – North Kansas City
- Cinder Block Brewery – North Kansas City
- Crown Valley Brewing & Distilling – Ste. Genevieve
- KC Cider Co – St. Joseph
- McIntyre Cider – St. James Winery – St. James
- Proper Cider – Schlafly – St. Louis,
- St. James Winery – St. James, St. Charles, Maplewood
- Riverwood Winery – Rushville
- Waves Cider Co. – Columbia

=== Montana ===
- Backroad Cider – Hamilton
- Big Mountain Ciderworks – Kallispell
- Last Chance Cider Mill – Billings
- Lockhorn Cider House – Bozeman
- Montana CiderWorks – Darby
- Rough Cut Hard Cider- Kalispell
- Western Cider – Missoula

=== Nebraska ===
- CurveBall Hard Cider – James Arthur Vineyards – Raymond
- Glacial Till Vineyard & Winery – Ashland
- SARO Cider – Lincoln
- Papa Moon Ciders – Scottsbluff
- Vala's Orchard Cider – Gretna

=== Nevada ===
- Mojave Brewing Company – Henderson
- Stonewise – Pahrump
- Vegas Valley Winery – Henderson

=== New Hampshire ===
- Bradford Bear – Bradford
- Butternut Farm – Farmington
- Contoocook Cider Company – Contoocook
- Farnum Hill Ciders – Lebanon
- Hermit Woods Winery & Deli – Meredith
- Moonlight Meadery – Londonderry
- North Country Hard Cider – Rollinsford
- Old Settlers Cider – Gilsum
- Pup's Cider – Greenfield
- Silver Mountain Cidery – Lempster
- Stump City Cider – Rochester

=== New Jersey ===
- Armageddon Brewing – Somerdale
- Artisan Orchard Hard Cider – Absecon, Cranford, Chester, Freehold, Hammonton, Jobstown, Lambertsville, Mt Holly, Wyckoff
- Beach Bee Meadery – Long Branch
- Burnt Mills Cider – Bedminster
- Ironbound Hard Cider – Asbury
- Melick's – Whitehouse Station
- Painted People Mead and Cider – Millville
- Professor's Hard Cider – Trenton
- Twisted Limb Hard Cider – Stillwater

=== New Mexico ===
- Bite Me Hard Cider – Black Mesa Winery – Velarde
- Brew Lab 101 Beer & Cider Co. – Rio Rancho
- Desert Dogs – Boese Brew Co. – Santa Fe
- New Mexico Hard Cider – Santa Fe
- Palmer Brewery and Cider House – Albuquerque
- Sandia Hard Cider – Albuquerque
- Tractor Brewing Company – Albuquerque, Los Lunas

=== New York ===
- 1911 Hard Cider – Beak & Skiff – Lafayette
- Aaron Burr Cider – Wurtsboro
- Abandoned Hard Cider – Kingston, Red Hook, Woodstock
- ADK Hard Cider – Plattsburgh
- Angry Orchard Cider Company – Walden
- Awestruck Ciders – Sidney
- Bad Seed Cider – Highland
- Becker Farms – Gasport
- Bellwether Hard Cider – Trumansburg
- Big Apple Hard Cider – New York
- Black Diamond Cider – Trumansburg
- BlackBird Cider Works – Barker, Buffalo
- Blackduck Cidery – Ovid
- Blackman Cider Co. – Lockport
- Blue Barn Cidery – Hilton
- Blue Toad Hard Cider – Rochester
- Breezy Hill Orchard and Cider Mill – Staatsburg
- Brooklyn Cider House – New Paltz
- Chateau Buffalo – Buffalo
- Cider Creek Hard Cider – Canisteo
- City Orchard - North Rose
- Clarksburg Cider – Lancaster
- Critz Farms Brewing & Cider Co. – Cazenovia
- Doc's Draft Hard Cider – Warwick
- East Hollow Cider – Petersburg
- Embark Craft Ciderworks – Williamson
- Eve's Cidery – Van Etten
- Fly Creek Cider Mill & Orchard – Fly Creek
- Forthright Cyder and Mead – Youngsville
- Four Grand wine & cidery – Baldwinsville
- Graft Cider – Newburgh
- Green Sun Orchard & Cidery – Sidney Center
- Greenpoint Cidery – Brooklyn
- Grisamore Cider Works – Locke
- Hardscrabble Cider – North Salem
- Hazlitt's Cider Tree – Hector
- Helderberg Meadworks – Esperance
- Hudson Valley Farmhouse Cider – Newburgh
- Indian Ladder Farms Cidery and Brewery – Altamont
- Kettleborough Cider House – New Paltz
- Kings Highway Cider Garden – Millerton
- Kite & String – Finger Lakes Cider House – Interlaken
- Lake Drum Brewing – Geneva
- Left Bank Ciders – Catskill
- Lindner's Cider – Hamden
- McKenzie's Hard Cider – West Seneca
- Melo Moon Cider – Greenwich
- Merchant's Daughter Ciderworks – Purdys
- Metal House Cider – Esopus
- Mountain Mule Ciderhouse – Middleport
- Naked Flock Cider – Applewood Winery – Warwick
- New Leaf Cider Co. – Binghamton
- New York Cider Company – Ithaca
- Nine Pin Cider – Albany
- Oak & Apple – Penfield
- Orchard Hill Cider Mill – New Hampton
- OSB Ciderworks/Original Stump Blower Ciderworks – Lakeville
- Original Sin – New York
- Patriots’ Heritage Cider – Schaghticoke
- Pennings Farm Cidery – Warwick
- Phonograph Cider – Seneca Falls
- Po'Boy Brewery – Jefferson Station
- Red Apple Bombshell Hard Cider – Geneva
- Red Hammer Orchard – Penn Yan
- Redbyrd Orchard Cider – New York, Trumansburg
- Riverhead Ciderhouse – Calverton
- Rockland Cider Works – Orangeburg, Gilboa
- Rootstock Ciderworks – Williamson
- Rose Hill Farm – Red Hook
- Scrumpy Ewe Cider – Richmondville
- Seed + Stone Cidery – Rochester
- Seminary Hill Orchard & Cidery – Callicoon
- Slyboro Ciderhouse – Granville
- South Hill Cider – Ithaca
- Star Cider – Canandaigua
- Steampunk Cider – Medina
- Sterling Cidery – Sterling
- Sundström Cider – Hudson
- Thompson's Cider Mill – Croton-On-Hudson
- Treasury Cider – Hopewell Junction
- Wayside Cider – Andes
- Westwind Orchard – Accord
- Windy Hill Cidery and Winery – Castleton-on-Hudson
- Wölffer Estate Vineyard – Sagaponack
- Woodside Orchards – Aquebogue, Riverhead
- Worthog Cider – Penn Yan

=== North Carolina ===
- Appalachian Mountain Brewery – Boone
- Appalachian Ridge Artisan Cidery – Hendersonville
- Barn Door Ciderworks – Fletcher
- Black Mountain Ciderworks – Black Mountain
- Blackwater Cider – Windsor
- Bold Rock Hard Cider – Mills River – Asheville Mills River
- Botanist & Barrel – Cedar Grove
- Bull City Ciderworks – Durham
- Chatham Cider Works – Pittsboro
- Fishing Creek Cider Company – Whitakers
- Flat Rock Cider Works – Hendersonville
- Grandfather Vineyard & Winery – Banner Elk
- James Creek Ciderhouse – Cameron
- Jeter Mountain Farm – Hendersonville
- Little Switzerland Orchard and Winery – Burnsville
- McRitchie Winery & Ciderworks – Thurmond
- Molley Chomper Hard Cider – Lansing
- Noble Cider – Asheville
- Red Clay Ciderworks – Charlotte
- Tipsy Hare Ciderworks – Kannapolis
- Urban Orchard Cider Co. – Asheville

=== North Dakota ===
- Cottonwood Cider House – Ayr
- Wild Terra Cider – Fargo

=== Ohio ===
- 5 Penny Hard Cider – Ontario
- Arsenal Cider House – Cleveland
- Bent Ladder – Doylestown
- Cidergeist – Cincinnati
- Dalton Union Winery & Brewery – Marysville
- Dutch Creek Winery – Athens
- Funky Turtle Brewing Company – Toledo
- Mad Moon Craft Cidery – Columbus
- Magis Cider Co. – Cleveland
- Manchester Hill Winery and Vineyard – Circleville
- Northwood Cider Co. - Norwood
- Redhead Ciderhouse – Berlin Heights
- Rhetoric Brewing Co. – Richwood
- Seek-No-Further Cidery – Granville
- Sons of Toil Brewing – MT Orab
- Spring Hill Cider Works – Geneva
- Sundog Ciderhouse – Columbiana
- The BottleHouse Brewing Company – Cleveland Heights, Lakewood
- The New Frontier Cider Company – Seville
- The New Frontier Cider Company – Seville
- TinCap Cidery – Wilmington
- Twenty One Barrels Hard Cider & Wine – Bradford
- Ugly Bunny Winery – Loudonville
- West End Cider House – Athens

=== Oklahoma ===
- OK Cider Co – Oklahoma City

=== Oregon ===
- ^5 Cider – Portland
- 10 Barrel Brewing – Bend
- 12 Bridge Ciderworks – Oregon City
- 1859 Cider Co. – Salem
- 2 Towns Ciderhouse – Corvallis
- Alter Ego Cider – Portland
- Apple Outlaw – Jacksonville
- Art+Science Winery – Sheridan
- Atlas Cider Co – Bend
- Baird & Dewar Farmhouse Cider – Dayton
- Bandon Rain – Bandon
- Bauman's Cider – Gervais
- Blue Mountain Cider Company – Milton-Freewater
- Bull Run Cider – Forest Grove
- Carlton Cyderworks – McMinnville
- Cider Riot! – Portland
- Core Alchemy Cider – Hillsboro
- Crush Cider – Hood River
- Doc Fields Cider – Redmond
- Double Mountain Brewery – Hood River
- E.Z. Orchards – Salem
- EdenVale Winery – Medford
- Elk Horn Brewery & Ciderhouse – Eugene
- Freewater Cider Company – Milton-Freewater
- Forest Edge Vineyard – Oregon City
- Fox Tail Cider – Hood River
- Gold Rush Cider – Medford
- Hedgerow Cidery – Dallas
- Hiyu Wine Farm – Hood River
- Hood Valley Hard Cider – Mt Hood
- Hopworks Urban Brewery – Portland
- HR Ciderworks – Hood River
- Logsdon Barrel House & Taproom – Hood River
- McMenamins Edgefield Winery – Troutdale
- Mt View Orchards – Mt Hood
- New West Cider – Portland
- OR\WA Cider Collective – Milwaukie
- Oregon Mead & Cider Co. – Portland
- Ovino Market – Hood River
- Portland Cider Company – Clackamas
- Queen Orchard – West Linn
- Rack & Cloth – Mosier
- Red Tank Cider – Bend
- Reverend Nat's Hard Cider – Portland
- Rimrock Cider – Bend
- Rivercider – Hood River
- Rogue Ales & Spirits – Newport
- Rookshire Lane Orchards – Eugene
- Runcible Cider – Mosier
- Seven Seeds Seidr – Forest Grove
- Slopeswell Cider Co. – Hood River
- Square Mile Cider Co. – Portland
- Swift Cider – Portland
- Ten Towers Cider Co. – Salem
- The Gorge White House – Hood River
- Tumalo Cider Company – Bend
- Wandering Aengus Ciderworks – Salem
- WildCraft Cider Works – Eugene
- Woodbox Cider Co. – Portland

=== Pennsylvania ===
- 814 Cider Works – State College
- After the Fall Cider – Rochester
- Arsenal Cider House – Pittsburgh
- Arundel Cellars & Brewing Co. – North East
- Banter's Hard Cider – Stroudsburg
- Bella Terra Vineyards – Hunker
- Big Hill Ciderworks – Gardners
- Blackledge Winery – Center Valley
- Broad Mountain Vineyard – Elizabethville
- Brother Monk Ciderworks – North Cambria
- Bullfrog Brewery – Williamsport
- Chester County Ciders – Westtown
- Civil War Cider – Lewisburg
- Colonel Ricketts Hard Cider – Benton
- Commonwealth Ciders – Philadelphia
- Conneaut Cellars Winery – Conneaut Lake
- Crooked Core Cider – Jeannette
- Deep Roots Hard Cider – Sugar Run
- Dressler Estate – Downingtown
- Five Maidens Cider Company – Bethlehem
- Frecon Farms – Boyertown
- Godfrey Run Farm – Lake City
- Good Intent Cider – Bellefonte
- Grand Illusion Hard Cider – Carlisle
- Hale & True Cider Co – Philadelphia
- Hardball Cider – Mt Bethel
- Innerstoic Wine & Cider Co. – Oregon Hill
- Jack's Hard Cider – Gettysburg
- KingView Mead – Cranberry Township, Mt. Lebanon, Washington
- Knockin Noggin Cidery & Winery – Volant
- Lancaster County Cider – Manheim
- Last Leg Cidery – Fleetville
- Levengoods of Lancaster – Lancaster
- Libations Winery – Mercer
- Maple Lawn Winery & Cider House – New Park
- Moon Dancer Winery & Cider House – Wrightsville
- Old Snappers Hard Cider Co. – Coraopolis
- Old Stone Cider – Lewisville
- Original 13 Ciderworks – Philadelphia
- Ploughman Cider Taproom – Gettysburg
- Red Balloon Cider – Emmaus
- Reid's Winery – Black Bear Hard Cider – Gettysburg
- RAW Urban Winery & Hard Cidery – Stoudsburg
- Space Time Mead & Cider Works – Dunmore
- Stone & Key Cellars – Montgomeryville
- Stone Mountain Winer Cellars – Pine Grove
- Sturges Orchard – Fombell
- Tattiebogle CiderWorks – Acme
- The De Cider – The De Cider
- Threadbare Cider House – Pittsburgh
- Under The Bridge – Lebanon
- Wild Elder Wine and Cider Co. – Jim Thorpe
- Wyndridge Cider Co. – Dallastown
- Young American Hard Cider – Philadelphia

=== Rhode Island ===
- Newport Vineyards – Middletown
- Sowams Cider Works Company – Warren
- Tapped Apple Cidery & Winery – Westerly

=== South Carolina ===
- Bee-Town Mead & Cider – Bluffton
- Ciclops Cyderi & Brewery – Spartanburg
- Fat Ass Heifer Cidery – Campobello
- Ship's Wheel Hard Cider – North Charleston
- Windy Hill Orchard & Cidery – York

=== Tennessee ===
- Brightwood Craft Cider – Nashville
- Diskin Cider – Nashville
- Gypsy Circus Cider Company – Kingsport, Knoxville
- TailGate Cider Company – Nashville
- Tennessee Cider Company – Gatlinburg
- The Apple Barn Cider House – Sevierville
- Wyile Cider – Sevierville

=== Texas ===
- Argus Cidery – Austin
- Austin Eastciders – formerly based in Austin, currently owned by Blake’s Beverage Company and largely produced in Armada Michigan.
- Austin Wine & Cider – Austin
- Bishop Cider Company – Dallas
- City Orchard – Houston
- Duo Winery & Cider Co. – Dickinson
- Hye Cider Company – Hye
- Leprechaun Cider Company – Houston
- Permann's Cider Co. – Houston
- Texas Keeper Cider – Manchaca

=== Utah ===
- Etta Place Cider – Torrey
- Mountain West Cider Company – Salt Lake City
- Stinger Hard Cider – The Hive Winery – Layton

=== Vermont ===
- Boyer's Orchard and Cider Mill – Monkton
- Champlain Orchards Cidery – Shoreham
- Citizen Cider – Burlington
- Cold Hollow Cider Mill – Waterbury
- Eden Specialty Ciders – Newport
- Fable Farm Fermentory – Barnard
- Flag Hill Farm – Vershire
- Little City Cider Co. – Bennington
- Peck Farm Orchard – Montpelier
- Scott Farm Orchard - Dummerston
- Shacksbury – Vergennes
- Silo Distillery – Windsor
- Stowe Cidery – Stowe
- Tin Hat Cider – Roxbury
- Wildbranch Cider – Craftsbury
- Windfall Orchard – Cornwall
- Woodchuck Cider – Middlebury
- Wyder's Cider – Middlebury

=== Virginia ===
- Albemarle CiderWorks – North Garden
- Big Fish Cider Company – Monterey
- Blue Bee Cider – Richmond
- Blue Toad Hard Cider – Afton
- Bold Rock Hard Cider – Nellysford, Charlottesville
- Bryant's Cider – Roseland, Richmond
- Buskey Cider – Cape Charles, Richmond
- Capital Hive Meadery – Leesburg
- Castle Hill Cider – Keswick
- Chateau Morrisette – Floyd
- Cider Lab – Sumerduck
- Ciders from Mars – Staunton
- Cobbler Mountain Cellars – Delaplane
- Corcoran Vineyards and Cidery – Waterford
- Courthouse Creek Cider – Maidens
- Coyote Hole Ciderworks – Mineral
- Ditchley Cider Works – Kilmarnock
- Fabbioli Cellars – Leesburg
- Halcyon Days Cider Co – Natural Bridge
- Henway Hard Cider – Bluemont
- Hinson Ford Cider & Mead – Amissville
- Lost Boy Cider – Alexandria
- Monroe Bay Winery – Colonial Beach
- Mt. Defiance Cidery & Distillery – Middleburg
- Old Hill Cider – Timberville
- Old Town Cidery – Winchester
- Old Trade Brewery & Cidery – Brandy Station
- Pen Druid Brewing – Sperryville
- Potter's Craft Cider – Charlottesville
- Pro Re Nata – Crozet
- Sage Bird CiderWorks – Harrisonburg
- Sly Clyde Ciderworks – Hampton
- Son of a Bear Cider – Rapidan
- Stable Craft Brewing – Waynesboro
- Strangeways Brewing – Fredericksburg, Richmond
- Sugar Hill Cidery – Norton
- The Winery at Kindred Pointe – Mt Jackson
- Troddenvale at Oakley Farm – Warm Springs
- Tumbling Creek Cider Company – Abingdon
- West Creek Cider – Richmond
- Wild Hare Hard Cider – Leesburg, Middleburg, Warrington
- Winchester Ciderworks – Winchester

=== Washington ===
- Alma Cider – Mount Vernon
- Alpenfire Cider – Port Townsend
- Archibald James Wine & Ciderworks – Leavenworth
- Bad Granny Hard Cider – Chelan
- Bardic Brewing and Cider – Spokane Valley
- Bellingham Cider Company – Bellingham
- BoatHouse CiderWorks – Orcas
- Brownrigg Hard Cider – Seattle
- Bushel & Barrel Ciderhouse – Poulsbo
- Camano Cider – Camano Island
- Channel Marker Cider – Seattle
- Chatter Creek Cider – Woodinville
- Chelan Craft Cider – Chelan
- CiderHead – Honey Moon Mead & Cider – Bellingham
- Cockrell Hard Cider – Puyallup
- Core Hero Hard Cider – Edmonds
- Dragon's Head Cider – Vashon
- Driftwood Hard Cider – Langley
- D's Wicked Cider – Kennewick
- Eaglemount Wine and Cider – Port Townsend
- Elemental Cider Co. – Arlington
- Fierce County Cider – Puyallup
- Finnriver Farm & Cidery – Chimacum
- Goose Ridge Estate Vineyard and Winery – Richland
- Greenbank Cidery – Greenbank
- Greenwood Cider Company – Seattle
- Hammered Dwarf Cider – Snohomish
- Hard Heidi's Cider – Sequim
- Heisen House Vineyards – Battle Ground
- Incline Cider Company – Tacoma
- Independent Cider – Leavenworth
- Inland Cider Mill – Spokane
- Jester & Judge – Stevenson
- Liberty Ciderworks – Spokane
- Locust Cider – Seattle, Gig Harbor, Olympia, Redmond, Spokane, Tacoma, Vancouver, Walla Walla, Woodinville
- Lost Giants Cider Company – Bellingham
- Madrone Cellars & Cider – Friday Harbor
- Manchester Road Cider Company – Chelan
- McMenamins Cider – Seattle
- Methow Valley Ciderhouse – Winthrop
- Mill Haus Cider Co. – Eatonville
- Misfit Island Cider Company – Langley
- Nashi Orchards – Vashon
- Offset Ciderworks – Seattle
- Ole Swede Cider – Tonasket
- One Tree Hard Cider – Spokane
- Pear Up Cider – Wenatchee
- Phillipi Ciderhouse & Distillery – Wenatchee
- Puget Sound Cider Company – Renton
- Ragged & Right Cider Project – Mount Vernon
- Renaissance Orchards – Ferndale, Washington
- Rockridge Orchards & Cidery – Enumclaw
- Rusty Grape Cider – Battle Ground
- Schilling Cider – Seattle
- Seattle Cider Company – Seattle
- Sixknot Cider – Winthrop
- Slightly Furry Beverage Company – Seattle
- Snowdrift Cider Co. – Wenatchee
- Soundbite Cider – Everett
- Spin Cider – Olalla
- Spire Mountain Ciders – Olympia
- Steelhead Cider – Chelan
- St-Lô Cider – Seattle
- Tart Hard Cider – Olympia
- Three Kees Cider – Snohomish
- Tieton Cider Works – Yakima
- Trailbreaker Cider – Liberty Lake
- Twilight Cider Works – Mead
- Union Hill Cider Co. – East Wenatchee
- Washington Gold Cider – Chelan
- Watercore Cider – Wenatchee
- Westcott Bay Cider – Friday Harbor
- Wheel Line Cider – Ellensburg
- Whitewood Cider Co. – Olympia
- Winsome Ciderworks – Woodinville
- Yonder Cider – Wenatchee

=== Washington, D.C. ===
- ANXO Cidery

=== West Virginia ===
- Hawk Knob – Lewisburg
- Swilled Dog – Upper Tract

=== Wisconsin ===
- AeppelTreow Winery & Distillery – Burlington
- Brix Cider – Barneveld
- Cider House of Wisconsin – McFarland
- Ciderboys Cider Company – Stevens Point
- Door Peninsula Winery – Sturgeon Bay
- Ela Cider Company – Waterford
- Ferro Farms – Lake Geneva
- Forgotten Fire Winery – Marinette
- Island Orchard Cider – Ellison Bay
- Lost Valley Cider Co. – Milwaukee
- Maiden Rock Winery & Cidery – Stockholm
- Mershon's Artisan Cider – Stoughton
- Restoration Cider Company – Madison
- Rushford Meadery and Winery – Omro
- The Cider Farm – Mineral Point
- Upstream Cider – Stevens Point
- Vines & Rushes Winery – Ripon
- Von Stiehl Winery – Algoma
- White Winter Winery – Iron River
- Forward Cider – Myra

=== Wyoming ===
- Farmstead Cider – Jackson

== See also ==
- List of cider brands
- Cider in the United States
- Beer and breweries by region
- Beer in the United States
- List of microbreweries
