= Cider in the United States =

History and production of cider in the United States

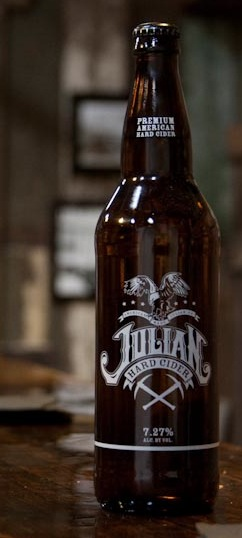
American Hard Cider in a Bottle

In the United States, the definition of cider is broader than in Europe. There are two types: one is the traditional fermented product, called hard cider, and the second is sweet or soft cider. However, in some regions, cider is the alcoholic version, whether made from apples or pears, and apple cider is the non-alcoholic version.

== Hard cider ==
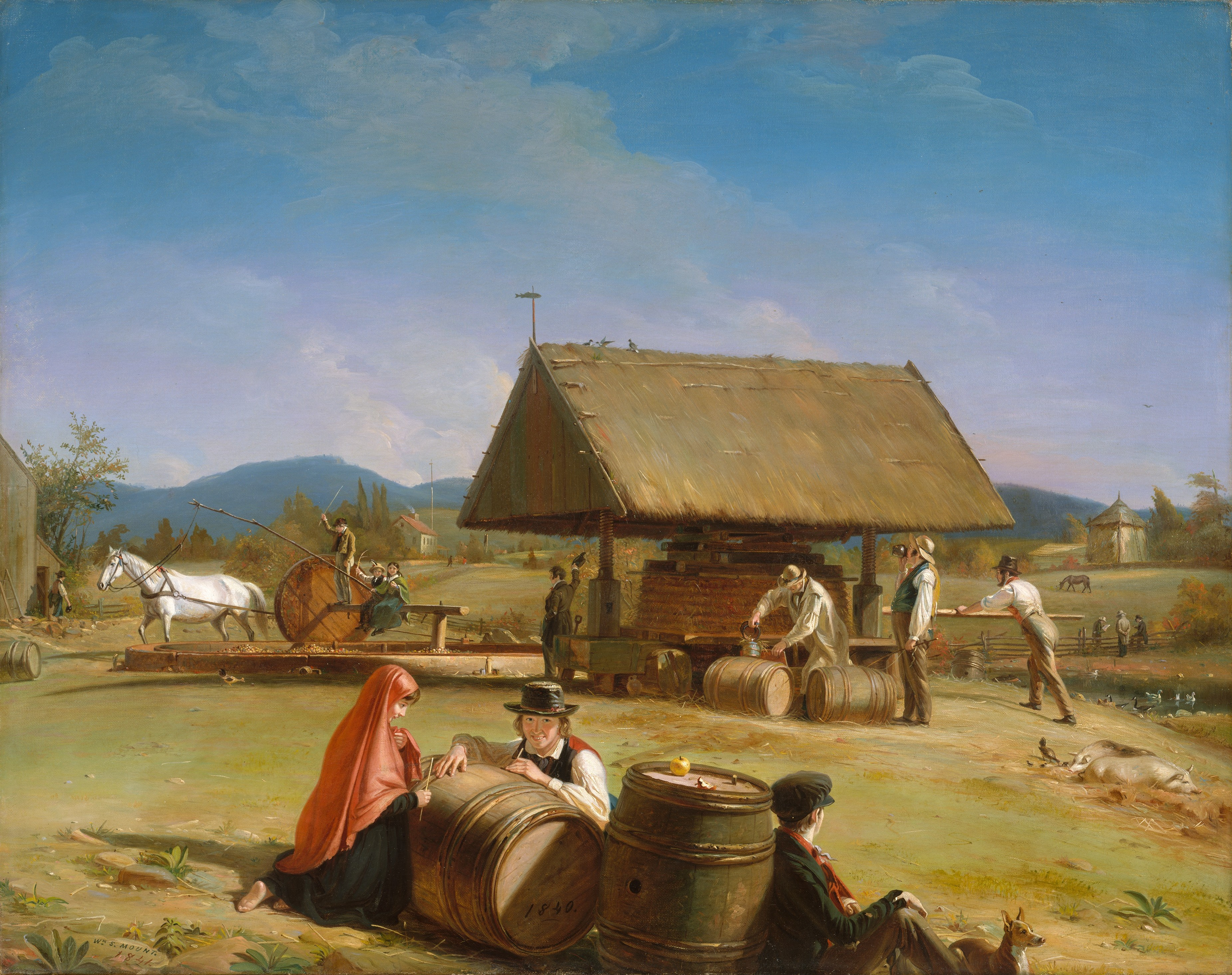
Cider Making, painting by William Sidney Mount, 1840–1841, depicting a cider mill on Long Island

The history of cider in the United States is very closely tied to the history of apple growing in the country. Most of the 17th- and 18th-century emigrants to America from the British Isles drank hard cider and its variants. Apples were one of the earliest known crops in the English-speaking New World; ships' manifests show young saplings being planted in barrels and many farmers bringing bags of seed with them, with the first settlers headed to what is now the Southeast. Within thirty-five years of the settlement of Jamestown in 1607, the land was put to plow to grow tobacco, which provided a source of revenue for the colonists and made British settlement a success in the New World after several failed attempts. However, other edible cash crops, like rice, maize, and apples, were grown as they had value in the markets of growing cities like London, Edinburgh, Dublin, and Cardiff.

Nine days after the Puritans landed, a man by the name of William Blackstone planted the first apple trees in the New England colonies. The first recorded shipment of honeybees to America, important for the pollination of apples, is recorded in 1622 in Virginia. In New England, John Winthrop, governor of Massachusetts Bay Colony in 1632, recorded his tenants paying their rent on Governor's Island in two bushels of apples a year. In 1634 Lord Baltimore instructed settlers of the new colony of Maryland to carry across the sea "kernels of pears and apples, especially of Pipins, Pearemains, and Deesons for making thereafter of Cider and Perry."

There are records of at least one English apple cultivar used for cider and cooking, Catshead, being grown on Berkeley Hundred Plantation in Virginia around this time; later introductions from the UK would have included Foxwhelp, Redstreak, and the extinct Costard. Other records from the Tidewater South show wealthier farmers and plantation owners arranging for the import of French apple varieties, such as Calville Blanc, Pomme d'Api, and Court Pendu Plat, likely in part due to qualities they wanted to improve in the stock available and the difficulty there was in keeping early breed-stock alive. They faced an uphill battle in cultivating many crops, however, because the honeybee is not a native insect to America and knowledge of the husbandry of orchard mason bees would remain limited until three centuries later. In Europe, honeybees were and still are the main means of pollination for apples, cherries, and pears, and thus some of the earliest pleas for new supplies sent home to Britain by Jamestown colonists were for beehives. Only about 20% of apple trees produced from apple seeds will grow a fruit comparable to the parent plant, while about 60% will be passable for consumption and the remaining 20% will be "crab apples", unfit for most human tastes. The records of all the thirteen colonies indicate that the favored method of propagation from 1607 to 1737 was not grafting since this method was expensive and the reserve of the wealthy using crabapple rootstock.

Diseases, pests, and temperature all presented challenges to growing in Eastern America. Tent caterpillars are parasites to Southern crab apple trees, black cherry trees, chokecherries, beach plums, and the sweet crabapple - members of the family Rosaceae, native to the Eastern United States. They made no distinction between these and the European derived young apple, cherry, quince, plum, and pear trees of the colonists, which had evolved no defense mechanism against moth larvae that would destroy the tree by eating the leaves. Fungi like cedar-apple rust destroyed trees' abilities to produce fruit, as it infects their buds and makes them sterile. In the case of the British or French derived apples, it proved disastrous since, unlike native Malus species, it had no immunity and would eventually die.

In 17th century Britain, orchards had been kept in a relatively open area for generations as most of the forest had been already cleared. But in America, leaving the trees without a surrounding fence in the open resulted in attracting nearby populations of black bears, woodchucks, skunks, raccoons, elk, and deer looking for food. The need for apple cultivars which would have a much higher yield of apples at harvest time proved to be paramount so that the entire crop would not be lost to animals, something that is still practiced today but began in colonial times. The climate of the American Southeast also had more extremes, where temperatures would easily exceed 26 °C in summer but fall below 3 °C in winter. Most of the cider, cooking, and dessert apples brought from the oceanic climate of Northwest Europe were not bred for high heat and humidity or late season frosts. Later, in the North, settlers from the British Isles had to adapt many of their husbandry practices as well because winter temperatures were cold with long snowy winters, and the first frost came much earlier. In the South, despite the longer growing season, it was difficult to get apples and pears to live long enough to bear fruit, let alone make cider or perry, and whatever cider they did produce was likely sour and of poor quality.

The earliest known successful orchard in America began in Massachusetts Bay Colony near what is today modern Boston. New England was successful in producing the first viable apples, evidenced by the fact that the oldest known and named apple varieties come from Massachusetts Bay Colony, Plymouth Colony, and Providence Plantation. This includes Roxbury Russet in 1634, High Top Sweet by 1630, and Rhode Island Greening in 1650 - all of which still survive and are still used for cider making and baking of pies. John Endicott, another New Englander, began one of the first known nurseries for apples and pears, and in 1648 he is recorded as selling 500 young trees to a William Trask, for which he received 250 acres of land. Approximately 20 years earlier it is believed that he planted a garden full of fruits selected for alcohol production, near what is present day Salem, Massachusetts of which one pear tree still survives. Later, as his trees matured, he began to sell them to new settlers and their bounty of cider and perry to local taverns, beginning one of the earliest examples of large scale propagation in the New World of apples and cider. By the 1660s regulations on the consumption and distribution of alcohol were being put into place, and court records show fines were being levied for drunkenness on hard cider in Massachusetts Bay Colony, in Maryland, and Virginia, among other places. In 1676, Nicholas Spencer, secretary of the Virginia House of Burgesses, speculated on the cause of the riots of the past two years, "All plantations flowing with syder, soe unripe drank by our licentious inhabitants, that they allow no time for its fermentation but in their brains."

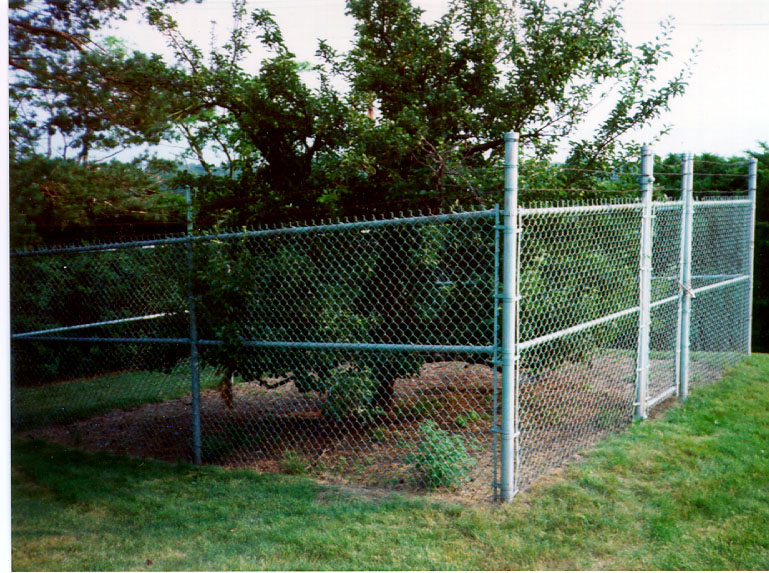
The Endicott Fruit Tree is a pear tree that was planted in the 1630s. It is the oldest living cultivated fruit tree in North America. Local law stipulates that it must remain undisturbed and is the town's prized possession, appearing on its seal. The Endicott family was a very prominent one that played a role in dispersing cider and perry apples right through the nineteenth century. The USDA has taken cuttings to examine it for its longevity and possibly plant its clones so the DNA may live on after the tree dies; the cultivar itself is quite rare.

In 1682, Governor Carteret of New Jersey wrote, "At Newark is made great quantities of syder, exceeding any that we have in New England, Rhode Island, or Long Island". A thousand hogsheads (238,481 liters) were filled that year in Newark. Around this time it became a trend to breed versatile apples that would go well with a joint of pork, could be peeled and baked in a pie or rendered into apple butter, but also had enough juice to ferment into alcohol and could be pressed into cider come autumn harvest. Unbeknownst to the British settlers of central colonies and Appalachia, it is likely some of the cultivars brought by Germans and Swedes introduced genetics that were much hardier to cold weather than the stock they possessed. The crossbreeding of these on other settler's lands via pollination introduced genetics that were very valuable to climates like Southern Appalachia. Ultimately the result of the mixed heritage of the Americas was a motley foundation stock from all over Northern Europe, resulting in seedlings and breeds of mixed provenance, such as the Harrison Cider Apple, Rambo, Black Gilliflower, Newtown Pippin, Green Cheese, and Baldwin. Many of these older apples are still used in cookery and in cider making even in the present day.

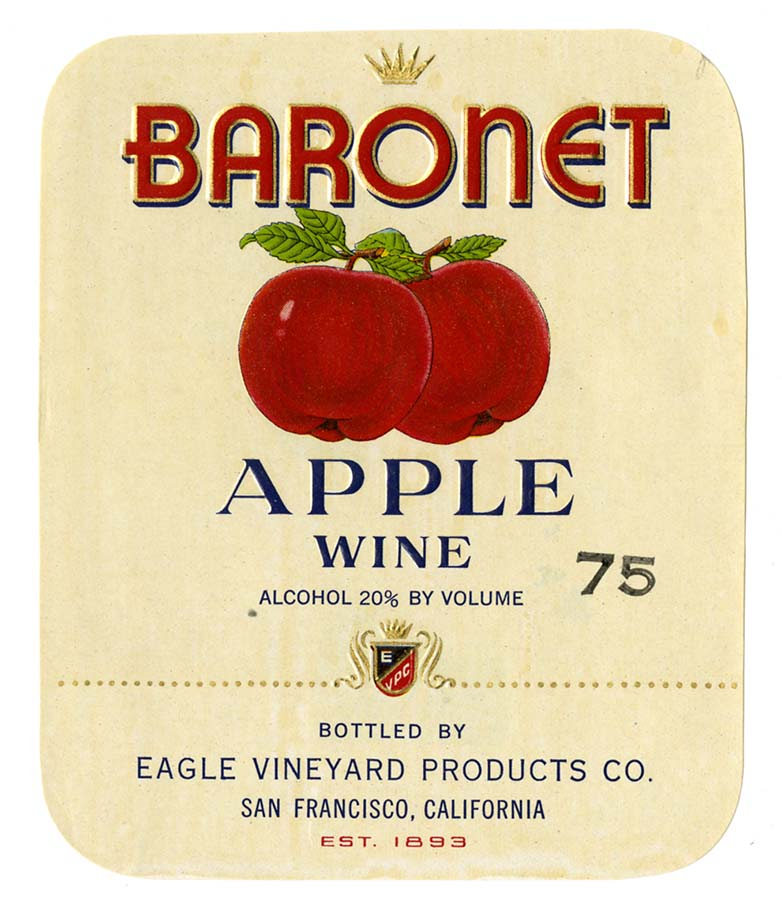
Eagle Vineyard, Baronet Apple Wine. Label from California Historical Society.

By the 18th century, apple cider was a staple at every family table; at harvest many apples were pressed into cider, the remainder placed carefully into barrels to store through winter for eating or replenishing supply. Pehr Kalm, a Swedish naturalist, noted in his travels in 1749 that nearly every home on Staten Island had a small orchard attached and in the colonial capital, Albany, apples were being pressed for cider to be exported south to New York City. Settlement along the frontier often included a legal requirement whereby an orchard of mature apple trees bearing fruit within three years of settlement were required before a land title was officially granted. For example, The Ohio Company required settlers to plant not less than fifty apple trees and twenty peach trees within three years. These plantings would guarantee land titles. In 1767, the average New England family was consuming seven barrels of hard cider annually, which equates to about 35-gallons per person. By 1775, one in ten New England families, most of them farmers, had a cider mill on the property. In one of his letters to his wife, Abigail, John Adams complained about the quality of Philadelphia alcohols and of being homesick for her cider. Thomas Jefferson grew several varieties of apple at his home in Virginia and his wife Martha Jefferson oversaw their harvest and brewing while she was mistress of the plantation. Ciderkin, a slightly alcoholic beverage made from cider pomace, could also be found on colonial tables, and was often served for breakfast. Applejack, made in the North, was made in a similar manner to Canadian ice cider every winter as an alternate means to concentrate alcohol when it was far too cold outside to bring out the cider press.

The taste for hard cider continued into the 19th century in pockets of the East Coast, but with the combination of immigration from Central and Eastern Europe, where lager beer is the traditional staple, and the later advent of Prohibition, hard cider manufacturing collapsed and did not recover after the ban on alcohol was lifted. Temperance fanatics burned or uprooted the orchards and wrought havoc on farms to the point that only dessert or cooking apples escaped the axe or torch; only a small number of cider apple trees survived on farmland abandoned before the 1920s and are only now being found by pomologists.

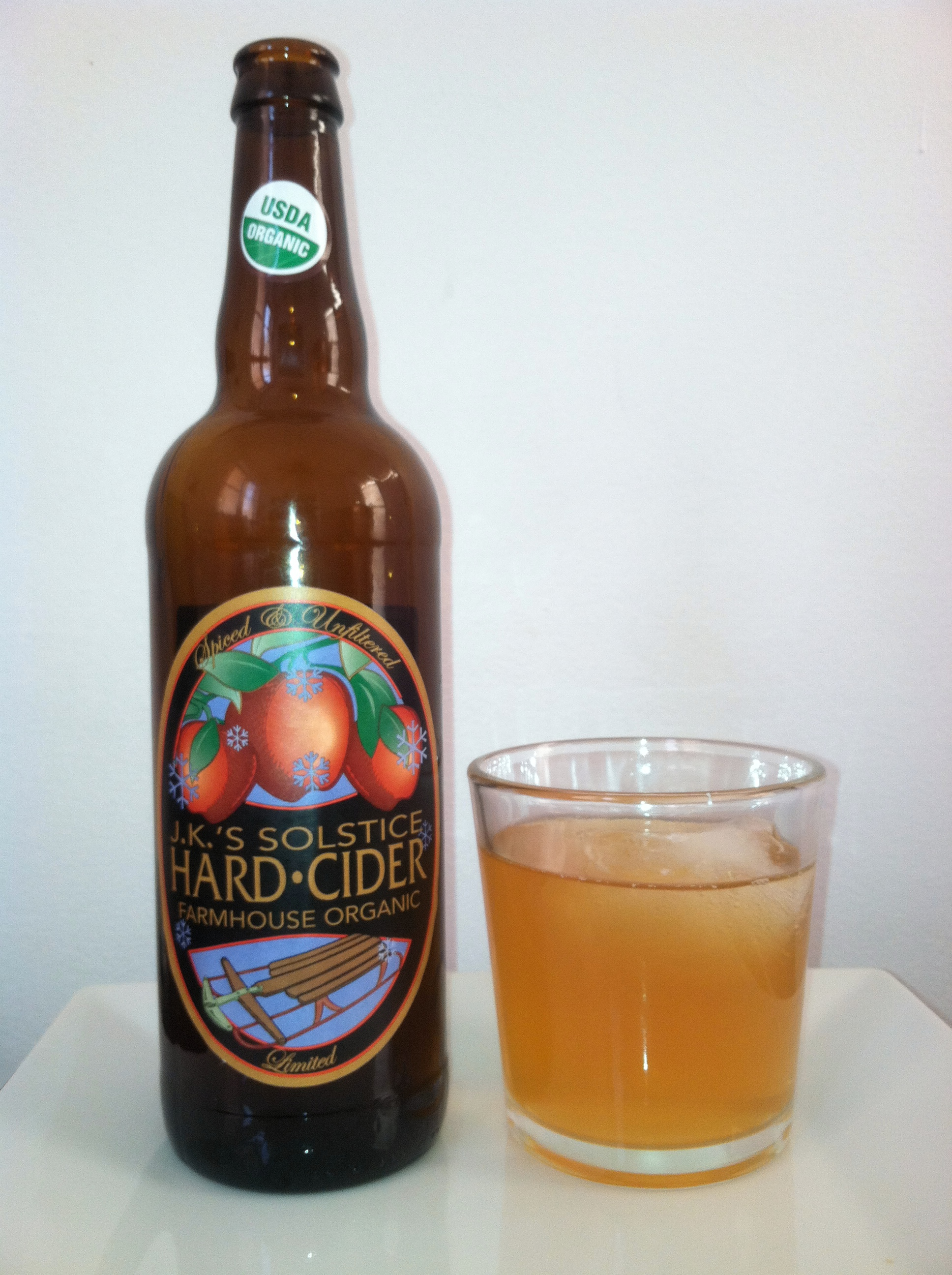
A hard cider produced in Michigan

In recent years interest has been revived in hard cider. Surviving heirloom varieties that had a role in the old orchards have been carefully catalogued, and many have been put up for sale at city farmer's markets or sold by the bushel to businesses wanting to make their own labels. On the East Coast, many have been taking cuttings of trees planted a hundred years ago and blending them experimentally into new brews, with California and the Great Lakes States following suit. Though it is currently only one percent of the alcoholic beverage market, it is outselling the craft beer and is projected to keep growing. Larger beer brewing companies, whose profits have declined due to the loss of market share to craft brews and change in public opinion on quality of their product, have bought cider making companies. The company that ferments Bulmers in Ireland purchased Woodchuck Hard Cider in 2012.

There is great diversity of taste in the types of hard cider, made by small local producers all the way up to the big beer conglomerates, and great variation from region to region. Because the US allows brewing for personal use, instructions for making homebrew are readily available on the internet. Chicago has been taking advantage of its proximity to an area in Michigan that has national importance as a major apple growing region, and Great Lakes producers are pressing an increasing amount of cider. In its first year, Michigan-based Virtue Cider pressed about 20,000 gallons of cider, or 75,708 liters, selling it in Chicago and other markets. In 2013, it pressed about 120,000 U.S. gallons (450,000 liters), and for the year 2014 it expects to press more than 200,000 U.S. gallons (760,000 liters).

== By region ==
=== New England hard cider ===
The early 20th century was difficult for the New England region in terms of alcohol production. In 1918, the Northeast suffered a particularly harsh winter that led to an apple shortage, and Prohibition and the Volstead Act destroyed most of the cider trees. As the effects of the 18th Amendment continued, Boston and the coastline of Massachusetts grew in importance as places where contraband alcohol from Eastern Canada and the Caribbean could be smuggled in by boat. Because Boston and the small fishing villages that dotted the New England coastline were a gateway for contraband alcohol, smuggling overshadowed, rather than preserved, local and rural drink. Then, the Great Depression hit and financial difficulties made many farmers abandon their orchards; the 1985 John Irving book The Cider House Rules shows that much of the surviving orchards' production had switched over to sweet cider by the 1940s, when the novel takes place.

However, the last quarter of the 20th century the cider industry in New England began a revival. Records of how cider was made were preserved, the equipment for creating sweet cider could easily be used to produce hard cider, and many of the old presses were still usable. Wine equipment could also be used in cider making. Heirloom apple varieties still survive in more remote areas of the region, sometimes hidden on abandoned farmland, and New England had contact with other countries such as Canada and Ireland that produced alcohol derived from apples, the latter country exporting it for the Irish community in Boston and the large Irish American population in the Northeast.

The earliest attempts for national revival of hard cider took place in New England in the mid-1980s. By the early 1990s cider making had reached the point that the first cider festival took place, and as of August 2014 the region had more than 44 different cideries, eighteen of them in Massachusetts alone. Notable in New England is the production of several different types of cider. Farmhouse cider is generally a simple, sweet alcoholic cider, while barrel-aged ciders tend to be aged for a few years in red oak barrels, to create a sharper flavor. Typical production methods do not use the horse and masher system of France or Europe but often are partially mechanical. Ice cider is also a product of the region. Producers have learned methods of production from their neighbors and relatives in Canada, and now ship their product to twenty different states. The conditions in New England are ideal for natural freeze distillation, with temperatures falling well below 0 °C by the second week of December. Experimental cider varieties made with ingredients like ginger and spice are also bottled, as is a variety consistent with the original brewing method native to the region in which, after an initial fermentation, sugar and raisins are added to the brew and the liquid is fermented again, boosting the alcoholic content up to 13%.

=== New York hard cider ===
New York City sits at the southern tip of the second most productive area for apple production in the country, the Hudson Valley. New York also has a long and productive history in agriculture, producing more than enough to feed itself and a substantial portion of the Northeastern US population.

The revival of cider has included New York City, and as of 2013, sales are up 70 percent. New York City also gets many of New England's brews shipped by truck every week and is becoming a major distribution center for the product. Hard cider has become a popular drink among restaurant and bar patrons in their 20s and 30s, and it is a common alternative to beer for a simple meal and for mixologists in their cocktails. There is a festival called Cider Week that takes place after the harvest in New York State is complete, the first leg taking place a few days before Halloween until All Souls Day in New York City, and again from mid-November until just before Thanksgiving in the rest of the Hudson Valley. The event has attracted major sponsors, such as Whole Foods and locavore organizations. It is known for VIP taste tests with cheese and a whole plethora of different styles, from foreign French and Spanish types to local, more experimental blends. Across the Hudson River in New Jersey, the oldest producer of Applejack in the country has been handed down through ten generations and can be found in bars across the state, fueled by a renewed interest in older style cocktails.

As of 2013 there are more than 20 producers in the state of New York, with more expected in the years to come. The increasing demand has solved a common problem for Apple producers in New York, where a crop of apples may be plentiful but have some blemished specimens that supermarkets will not take; additionally, smaller producers are freed to use older varieties that russet or cosmetically are ugly, but are well suited to being juiced or baked. Governor Andrew Cuomo and Senator Charles Schumer are re-evaluating how the local product is taxed to make it more competitive nationally.

=== California hard cider ===
California is a large contributor to the agriculture business in the United States, growing much of the nation's fruit and vegetables. New varieties of apples better adapted to the cool and rainy climate were developed for the region, most notably by breeders like Albert Etter and Luther Burbank. During World War II, California often produced the bulk of apples for consumption by troops using just one cultivar: Gravenstein, brought to California by Russian settlers in the 19th century. Much of the production was centered around Sonoma and the trees were cut down to make way for vineyards in the subsequent decades.

California had 28 hard cider producers scattered over the San Joaquin Valley and the Napa region in 2014. Orchards partially provide cideries in California with their cider apples while simultaneously importing other, more bitter, varieties from France and England to diversify the available flavor palate. Some cideries are looking at Hidden Rose and Pink Pearl, apple cultivars of West Coast origin that were originally envisioned for cooking, but have a rare mutation such that, when pressed, they will make a rosé cider.

Like their wine growing neighbors, California cideries offer tours and taste tests, as well as ship their cider for wider distribution.

=== Virginia hard cider ===
Virginia’s cider industry has expanded over the past few years, with more than 20 cideries across the Commonwealth. Virginia is the sixth-largest apple producing state by acreage in the United States. Cider styles vary from large bottle heirloom ciders to canned and draft cider. Virginia Cider Week is celebrated the second week of every November.

== Sweet or soft cider ==
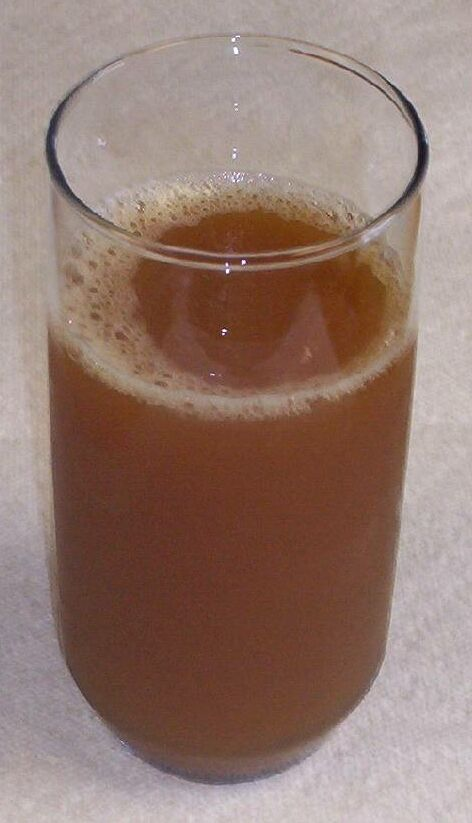
Unfiltered sweet (non-alcoholic) apple cider

In current U.S. usage, one must specify between hard or regular cider, regular being devoid of alcohol. To cater to a wide range of customers, even bars or breweries that make their own in-house beers and ciders may still offer the non-alcoholic version; one should not assume they are ordering the alcoholic version. Sweet cider typically is the direct result of pressed apples; according to the regulations of the Commonwealth of Pennsylvania, apple cider is legally defined as an "amber golden, opaque, unfermented, entirely nonalcoholic juice squeezed from apples". This is distinct from apple juice, which has a much sweeter taste, is typically heavily filtered, and may or may not be from concentrate. Both products are pasteurized and are considered unsafe for consumption or large-scale sale otherwise. Sweet cider is typically drunk in the US as the weather gets colder, and in the East it is often served hot and mulled with spices. It is often considered a feature of end-of-year holidays like Halloween, Thanksgiving, and Christmas.

Sparkling cider is the result of Prohibition Era crackdowns on alcohol and is a carbonated type of juice. It is often served at Thanksgiving and Christmas, served chilled. Sparkling cider, or other sparkling juices such as grape, is often given to children or teetotalers instead of champagne for toasts, for example at weddings or New Year's Eve.

Due to tax legislation in the US a cider becomes classified as a fruit wine when sugar or extra fruit is added and secondary fermentation increases the strength.

== See also ==
- Applejack
- American Wine
- Beer in the United States
- Cider Act
- List of cider brands
