= Woodchuck (disambiguation) =

Woodchuck, also known as a groundhog, is a rodent of the family Sciuridae.

Woodchuck may also refer to:

- Woodchuck Hard Cider, an alcoholic drink
- Junior Woodchucks, a boy scouts-like youth organization in Disney's fictional universe
- A person native-born in Vermont
