= Short Hills Wildlife Management Area =

Protected area of Virginia, United States

- IUCN category V (protected landscape/seascape)
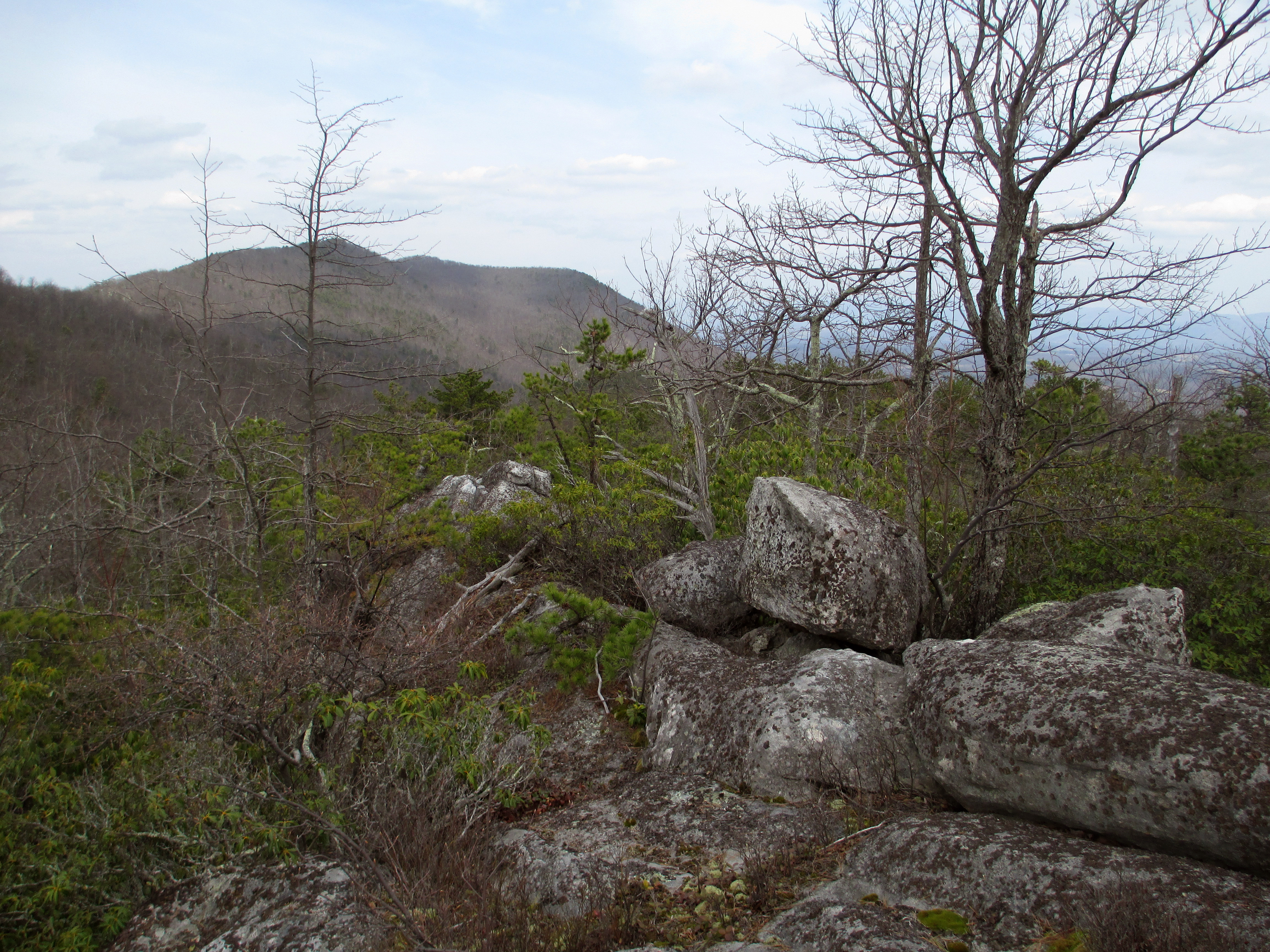
- Looking north along the Short Hills Range from within Short Hills Wildlife Management Area, March 2017

- Location within Virginia Location within the United States
- Location: Rockbridge and Botetourt counties, Virginia
- Nearest city: Lexington
- Coordinates: 37°39′21″N 79°36′40″W
- Area: 4,232 acres (17.13 km^{2})
- Established: July 2010
- Governing body: Virginia Department of Game and Inland Fisheries

Short Hills Wildlife Management Area is a 4,232-acre (17.13 km^{2}) Wildlife Management Area (WMA) located in Rockbridge and Botetourt counties, Virginia. It covers approximately 10 miles (16 km) of ridgeline along the Short Hills range.

== History ==
Short Hills Wildlife Management Area was acquired by the Virginia Department of Game and Inland Fisheries (VDGIF) in July 2010, after the land was initially secured by two non-governmental conservation organizations. Half of the WMA was first purchased by the Virginia Outdoors Foundation, which paid $3 million for a portion of the tract before donating the land to VDGIF. The other half was first purchased by the Wildlife Foundation of Virginia; that parcel was subsequently acquired by VDGIF for $3 million, utilizing Pittman–Robertson Federal Aid funds.

Although the acquisition was praised by conservation groups due to the parcel's protection of wildlife habitat and water resources, some members of the public vocally criticized the purchase due to the land's rugged nature and limited accessibility for public walk-in hunting. The long and often narrow area includes a single one-mile (1.6 km) stretch of land bordering public roads; the remainder is landlocked by private property.

== Description ==
The majority of Short Hills WMA is located in Rockbridge County with the remainder in Botetourt County. It covers approximately 10 miles (16 km) of ridges along the Short Hills range, which reaches a maximum elevation of 3,143 feet (958 m). The landscape includes 3,482 acres (14.09 km^{2}) of mixed pine and hardwood forests, as well as 750 acres (3.0 km^{2}) of former open farmland. The area also includes rocky karst topography. The headwaters of Cedar Creek, which flows through the nearby Natural Bridge rock formation, are located within the WMA.

The area is owned and maintained by the Virginia Department of Game and Inland Fisheries, and is open to the public for hunting, trapping, hiking, and primitive camping. Access for persons 17 years of age or older requires a valid hunting or fishing permit, or a WMA access permit.

As of 2017, public access points remain limited to a one-mile (1.6 km) stretch of Plank Road (Virginia State Route 610) that borders the area. A small parking area off Plank Road has also been developed for public use.

== See also ==
- List of Virginia Wildlife Management Areas
