= Vine Forest =

Historic house in Virginia, United States

- U.S. National Register of Historic Places
- Virginia Landmarks Register
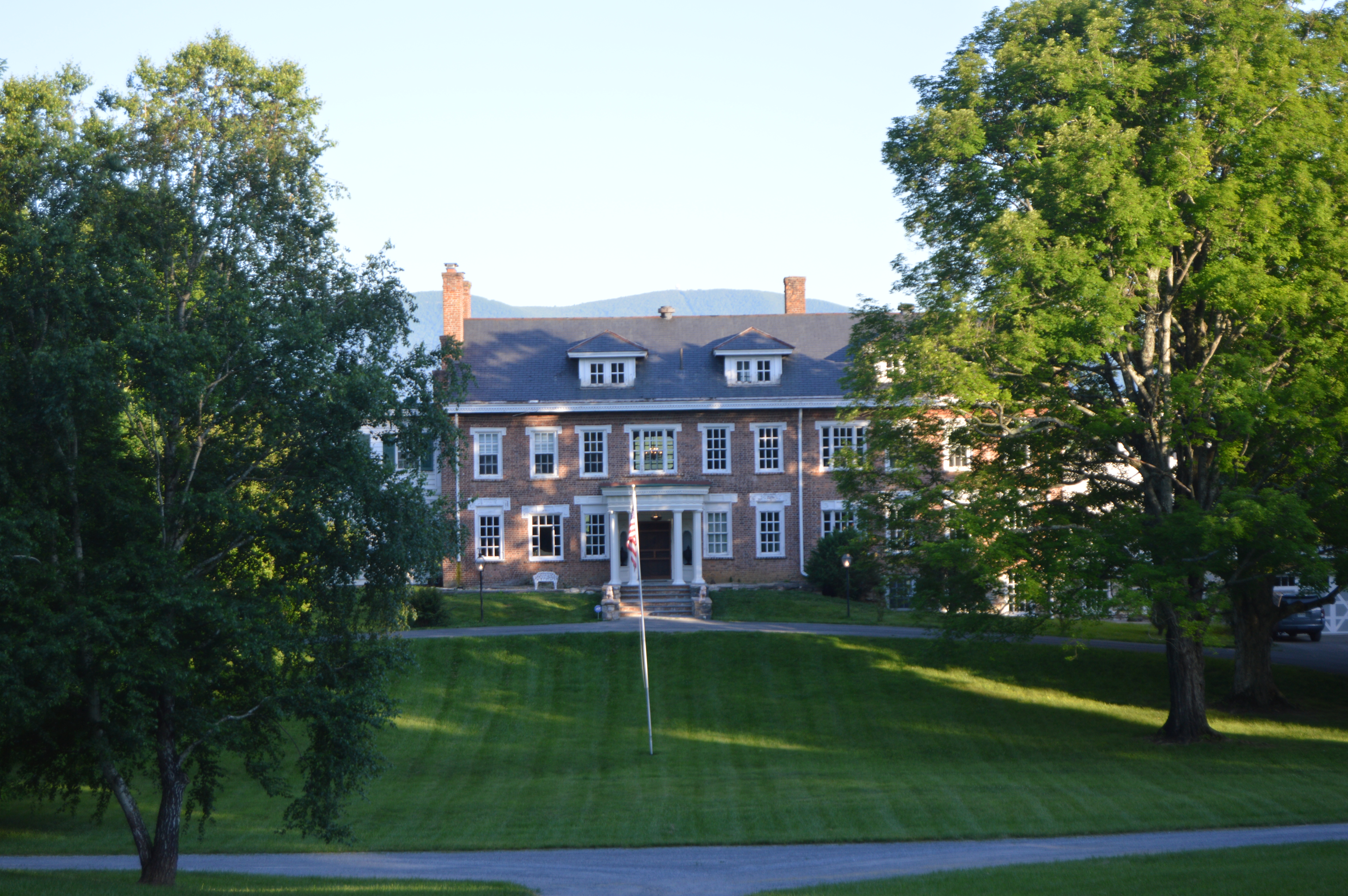
- Front of the house

- Location within Virginia Location within the United States
- Location: U.S. Route 11, 2 miles west of Natural Bridge, Virginia
- Coordinates: 37°37′31″N 79°34′42″W
- Area: 50 acres (20 ha)
- Built: 1806
- Architect: Curtis Walton
- Architectural style: Colonial Revival, Federal
- NRHP reference No.: 91001084
- VLR No.: 081-0207

Significant dates
- Added to NRHP: August 23, 1991
- Designated VLR: June 19, 1991

Vine Forest, also known as Forest Oaks, Forest Tavern, and The Inn at Forest Oaks is a historic home located near Natural Bridge, Rockbridge County, Virginia. The original section was built in 1806 by Matthew Houston, the cousin of famous Texan, Sam Houston. The original house served as a store, tavern, and home for the Houston family, the primary dwelling on their sprawling plantation.

In 1812, Houston expanded the house with substantial Colonial Revival additions, adding a two-story center hall with a full arched ceiling, reminiscent of the nearby Natural Bridge. Surviving the ravages of the American Civil War, the house stood virtually unchanged over the following century.

In 1916, the property was purchased by Ohio architect Curtis Walton and his aunt Lilly who transformed the original federal style structure into an English country manor reminiscent of Lilly's British ancestry. The two-story center hall remained, however the original arched ceiling was removed and replaced with stunning oak woodwork and arches salvaged from an English estate. Two-story frame wings and a two-story rear verandah were also added.

In addition, the Walton's built three Greek revival cottages on the property. The largest, Vine Cottage, served as a temporary home as the Manor House was being renovated.

Vine Forest was listed on the National Register of Historic Places in 1987.
