= Portland Cider Company =

Cidery based in Clackamas, Oregon, U.S.

Coordinates: 45.4153°N 122.5726°W

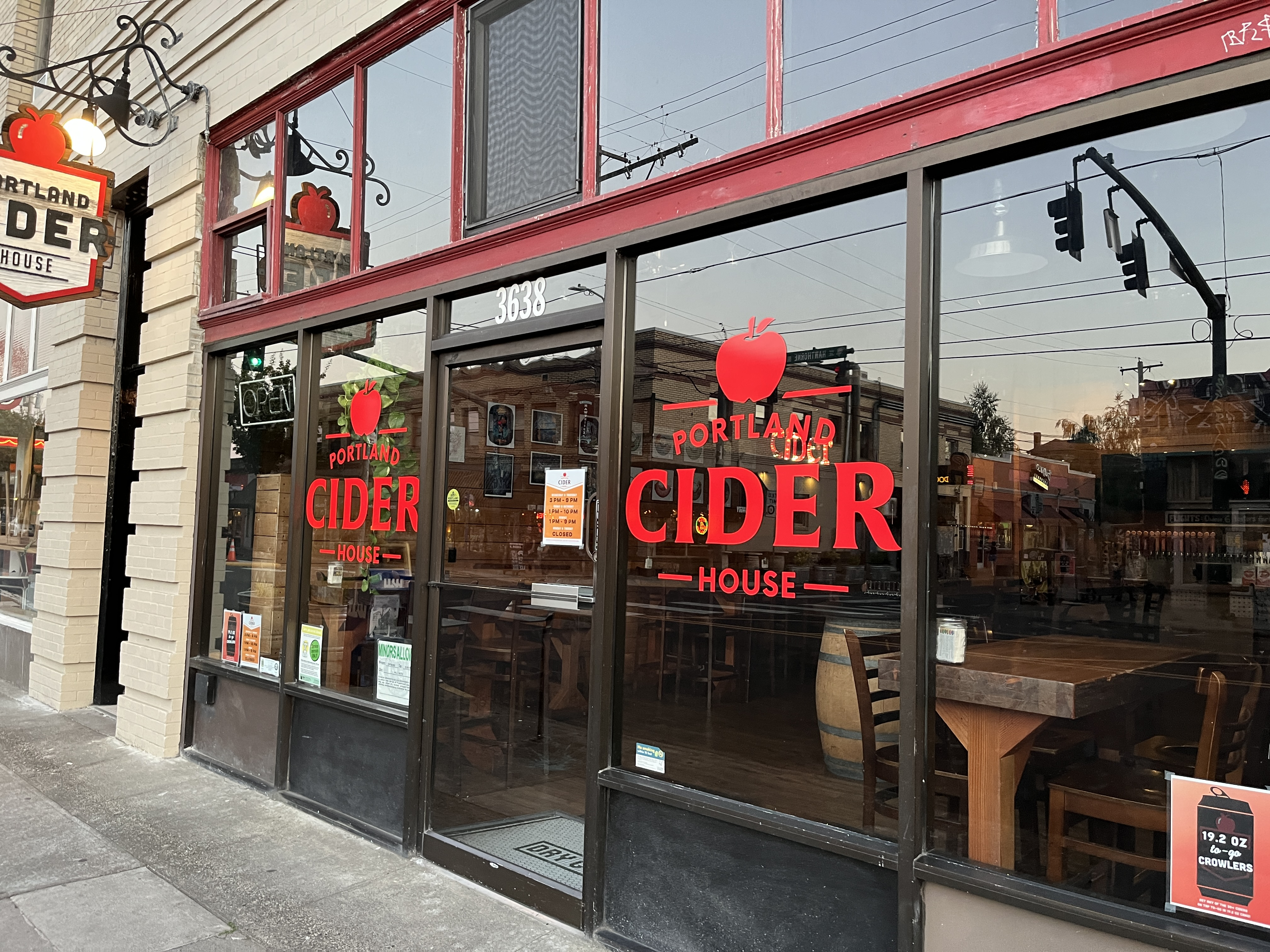
- Exterior of the defunct Portland Cider House on Hawthorne Boulevard in southeast Portland, Oregon, 2022
- Founded: 2013; 13 years ago
- Founders: Jeff and Lynda Parrish
- Headquarters: Clackamas, Oregon, United States
- Website: portlandcider.com

Portland Cider Company is a cidery based in Clackamas, Oregon, United States. It is Oregon's second largest craft cider producer. In addition to Clackamas, the business has operated taprooms in Beaverton and Portland. The Portland taproom, called Portland Cider House, closed in 2024.

== History ==
Jeff and Lynda Parrish founded Portland Cider Company in 2013. The business has become Oregon's second largest craft cider producer and is distributed in California, Colorado, and Washington. Portland Cider produces 300,000 gallons per year. It makes a community cider every year using apples and pears donated by the public.

Portland Cider has collaborated with the Hillsboro Hops.

=== Taprooms ===
Portland Cider has operated three taprooms, in Clackamas, Portland, and Beaverton. The Beaverton location was the third to open. The taproom on Hawthorne Boulevard in southeast Portland, called Portland Cider House, closed in 2024. At the pub in Clackamas, Portland Cider has served fondue with apples, cheeses, pickles, and apple-rhubarb mustard.

== Reception ==
Portland Cider's Original Gold Cider received the best-in-class trophy at the International Brewing and Cider Awards in London in 2024, which was a first for a U.S. company.

== See also ==
- Cider in the United States
- List of cideries in the United States
