= Natural Bridge, Virginia =

- Unincorporated community
- Location within Virginia Location within the United States
- Coordinates: 37°37′48″N 79°32′35″W
- Country: United States
- State: Virginia
- County: Rockbridge
- Elevation: 1,076 ft (328 m)
- Time zone: UTC-5 (Eastern (EST))
  - Summer (DST): UTC-4 (EDT)
- ZIP code: 24578
- Area code: 540
- GNIS feature ID: 1485802

Natural Bridge is an unincorporated community in Rockbridge County, Virginia, United States. The community is the site of Natural Bridge, a natural arch which gives the town its name. Natural Bridge is located at the junction of U.S. Route 11 and State Route 130. Natural Bridge has a post office with ZIP code 24578, which opened on June 1, 1800.

== Attractions ==
The main attraction in the community is the Natural Bridge. The site, a National Historic Landmark, is a natural arch within a limestone gorge formed by Cedar Creek. The land including the bridge was once owned by Thomas Jefferson, and according to legend, George Washington surveyed the bridge. Natural Bridge Zoo, Natural Bridge Caverns and the Virginia Safari Park are located nearby. In addition to the Natural Bridge, the Rockbridge Inn, Vine Forest, and Virginia Manor are listed on the National Register of Historic Places, and the heart of the resort area at the center of the village is listed as the Natural Bridge Historic District.

== See also ==
- National Register of Historic Places listings in Rockbridge County, Virginia
