= Foxwhelp =

Apple cultivar

'Foxwhelp'
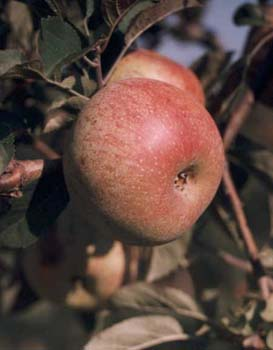
- Species: Malus domestica
- Origin: England, 1600s.

The Foxwhelp is a very old cider apple cultivar, originating in the west Midlands of England.

== History ==
This is one of the oldest surviving varieties of cider apple; it is first mentioned in John Evelyn's Advertisements Concerning Cider in his work Pomona of 1664, in which it is commented that "cider for strength [...] is best made of the Fox-whelp of the Forest of Dean, but which comes not to be drunk until two or three years old". It is usually said to have originated in Gloucestershire or Herefordshire. By the early eighteenth century, it had become one of the most prized cultivars for cider: a letter written by a Hugh Stafford in 1727 states "I have been told by a person of credit that a hogshead of cider from this fruit has been sold in London for £8 or eight guineas, and that often a hogshead of French wine has been given in exchange for the same quantity of Fox-whelp. It is said to contain a richer and more cordial juice than even the Red-streak itself".

Along with many other old varieties of apple, the Foxwhelp is now rare. Some sources state that many apples identified as Foxwhelp today are not, in fact, the original variety, which came to be known as "Old Foxwhelp" to distinguish it from later sports (such as Improved Foxwhelp, developed by H. P. Bulmer), which were selected from the original cultivar. By the 1960s the Long Ashton Research Station could locate only "a few very old trees" of Old Foxwhelp in Herefordshire and Gloucestershire. However, the Gloucestershire Apple Collection did manage to secure cuttings for propagation from an orchard in Gloucestershire, which had been used by Long Ashton as a source of Foxwhelp propagating material until the 1950s.

== Characteristics ==
The Foxwhelp is classed as a "bittersharp" cider apple, containing high levels of tannin and malic acid. It has small to medium-sized fruit, usually ripening in September, with an uneven, ridged shape, and a deep crimson skin with yellow stripes. Its flesh is acidic and yellow with a red tinge, and its juice will produce a powerful, tannic cider. Hogg found that its "extremely rich and saccharine" juice had a specific gravity of 1076, and even higher in shrivelled fruit, and noted that it was used in most Herefordshire ciders to add strength.

The tree has a naturally upright habit, with large branches; the leaves are distinctively curled and wavy. It is particularly known for its tendency to produce sports (mutations), on single branches. These mutations were a source of many of the later 'improved' varieties of Foxwhelp, such as Black Foxwhelp, Red Foxwhelp, and possibly Broxwood Foxwhelp. The 'New' or 'Rejuvenated Foxwhelp' (syn. 'Crow's Kernel', 'Canon Apple') was a 19th-century attempt to improve the old variety by a process of working scions of 'Old Foxwhelp' onto seedlings of the same variety. Hogg said that the process was begun in around 1800 by a Mr. Yeomans of Much Cowarne, and continued by a Mr. Crowe of Canon Pyon, after which the variety came to the attention of growers.

The Foxwhelp is susceptible to the disease apple scab.
