= Cider Act =

American federal legislation

The Cider Act, or CIDER Act, is a law co-sponsored by Senator Ron Wyden and Representative Earl Blumenauer along with lawmakers from other cider-producing U.S. states that reduces taxes on ciders. Previously, ciders with too high of an alcohol percentage or with a certain amount of carbonation were taxed up to fifteen times higher than normal. In addition, the legislation "boosts federal funding to speed up label and formula approval, making it faster and easier for producers to get new varieties on store shelves and on tap" at local establishments.

== See also ==
- Cider in the United States
