= Rockbridge Inn =

Historic commercial building in Virginia, US

- U.S. National Register of Historic Places
- Virginia Landmarks Register
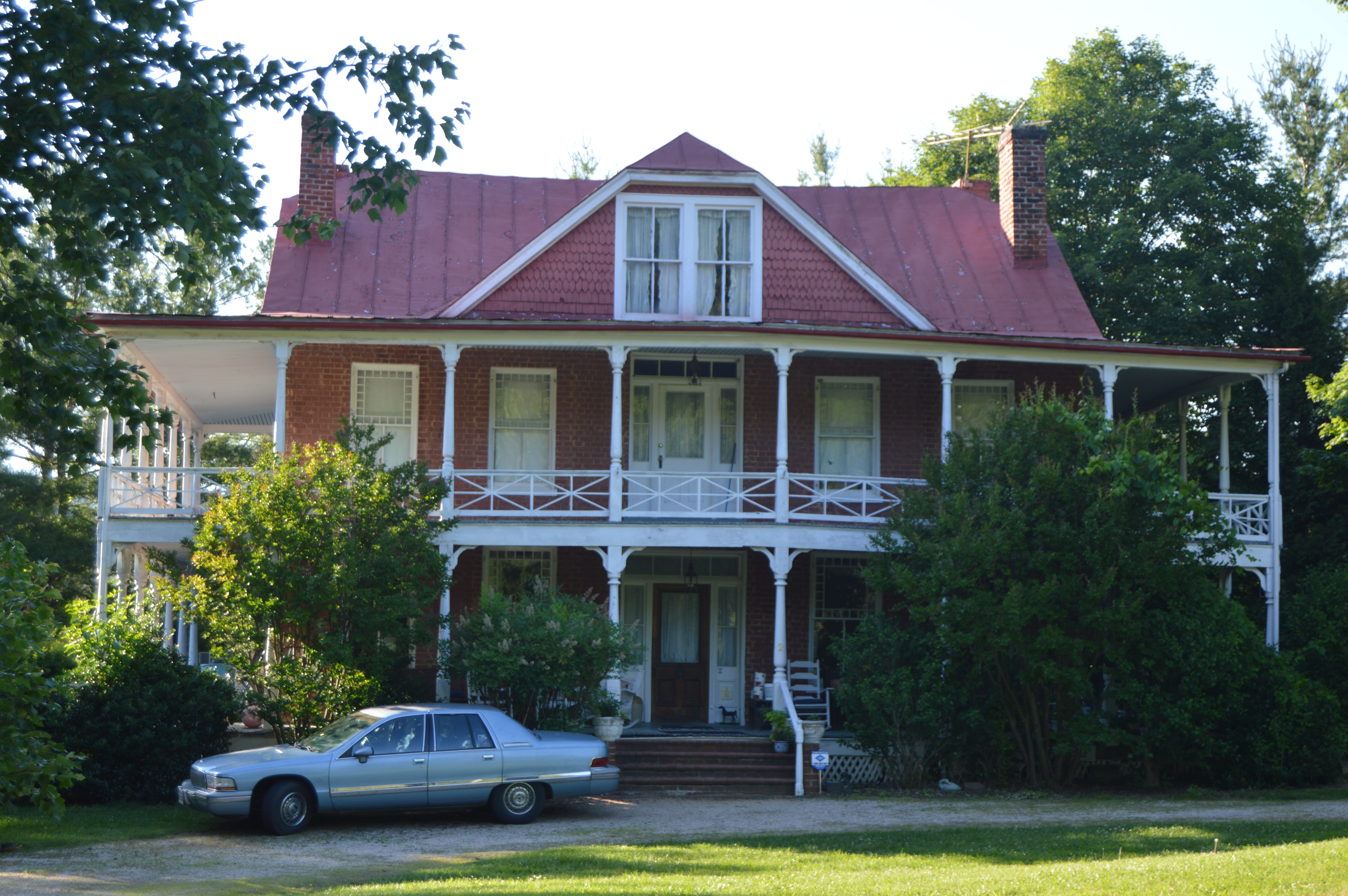
- Front of the inn

- Location within Virginia Location within the United States
- Location: Northern side of Herring Hall Rd. at its junction with Rices Hill Road, near Natural Bridge, Virginia
- Coordinates: 37°39′20″N 79°32′14″W
- Area: 1.5 acres (0.61 ha)
- Built: 1821-1823, 1841, 1880s
- NRHP reference No.: 95000398
- VLR No.: 081-0399

Significant dates
- Added to NRHP: April 7, 1995
- Designated VLR: April 28, 1995

Rockbridge Inn is a home which served as a historic inn and tavern located near Natural Bridge, Rockbridge County, Virginia. It was built between 1821 and 1823, and is a two-story, five-bay, brick building. A two-story frame wing was built in 1841. It was remodeled in the 1880s, with the addition of two-story porches and interior redecoration. It operated as an inn until the 1940s. The property was owned in the 1880s by Colonel Henry Parsons, owner of Natural Bridge.

It was listed on the National Register of Historic Places in 1995.
