= The Caverns at Natural Bridge =

Caves in Virginia (US)

- Natural Bridge Caverns
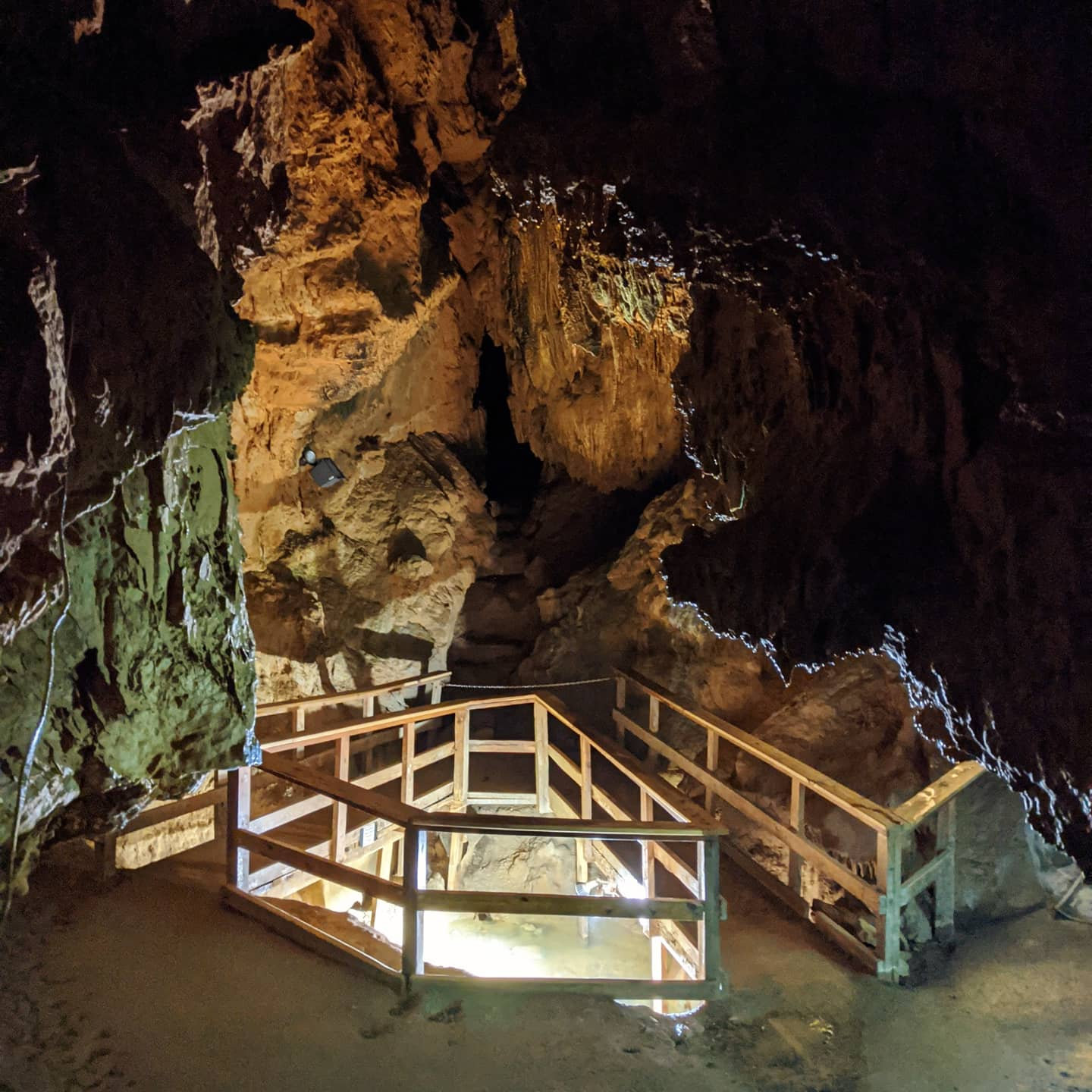
- Formations at the Caverns at Natural Bridge

- Location within Shenandoah Valley Location within Virginia Location within the United States
- Location: 6477 S Lee Hwy, Natural Bridge, Virginia 24578
- Coordinates: 37°38′8.7288″N 79°32′29.9364″W
- Depth: 347 ft (106 m)
- Discovery: 1889
- Geology: Cavern; Karst topography
- Access: yes; commercial
- Show cave opened: yes
- Features: Two unique species; various geological features: Colossal Dome Room, Mirror Lake, Well Room, Canyon Room
- Website: www.naturalbridgeva.com/caverns.html

The Caverns at Natural Bridge are a series of commercial show caves in the Shenandoah Valley of Virginia, close in proximity to both the Natural Bridge and Natural Bridge State Park. Discovered in the 1890s, it was opened to the public in 1977.

The Caverns at Natural Bridge are the deepest commercial cavern on the east coast. The Caverns are home to two unique species — a beetle called the Natural Bridge Cave Beetle (Pseudanophthalmus pontis) and the Natural Bridge Isopod (Caecidotea bowmani).

== Description ==
Guided tours and lantern tours are available. The Caverns are allegedly haunted. Tours usually last around 45 minutes.

The temperature remains a cool 54 °F (12 °C). The Caverns feature many unique structures including the Colossal Dome Room, Mirror Lake, Well Room, and the Canyon Room. The deepest part of the Cavern is 347 feet (106 meters) below the ground's surface.

The Caverns at Natural Bridge were previously called Buck Hill Caverns.

== History ==
The Caverns were discovered by brothers Jake and Joe Fitzgerald. The owner of the property at the time was Colonel Henry Chester Parsons, who was also associated with the opening of The Natural Bridge.

== Geology ==
The Shenandoah Valley is underlain with limestone and also has karst topography, forming caves throughout the region. Rainwater becomes slightly acidic as it seeps through the soil. The acid slowly erodes the calcium carbonate, the main component of limestone, creating caves, sinkholes and springs throughout the landscape. There are many caves and caverns throughout the surrounding area.
