= Woodchuck Hard Cider =

American brand of cider

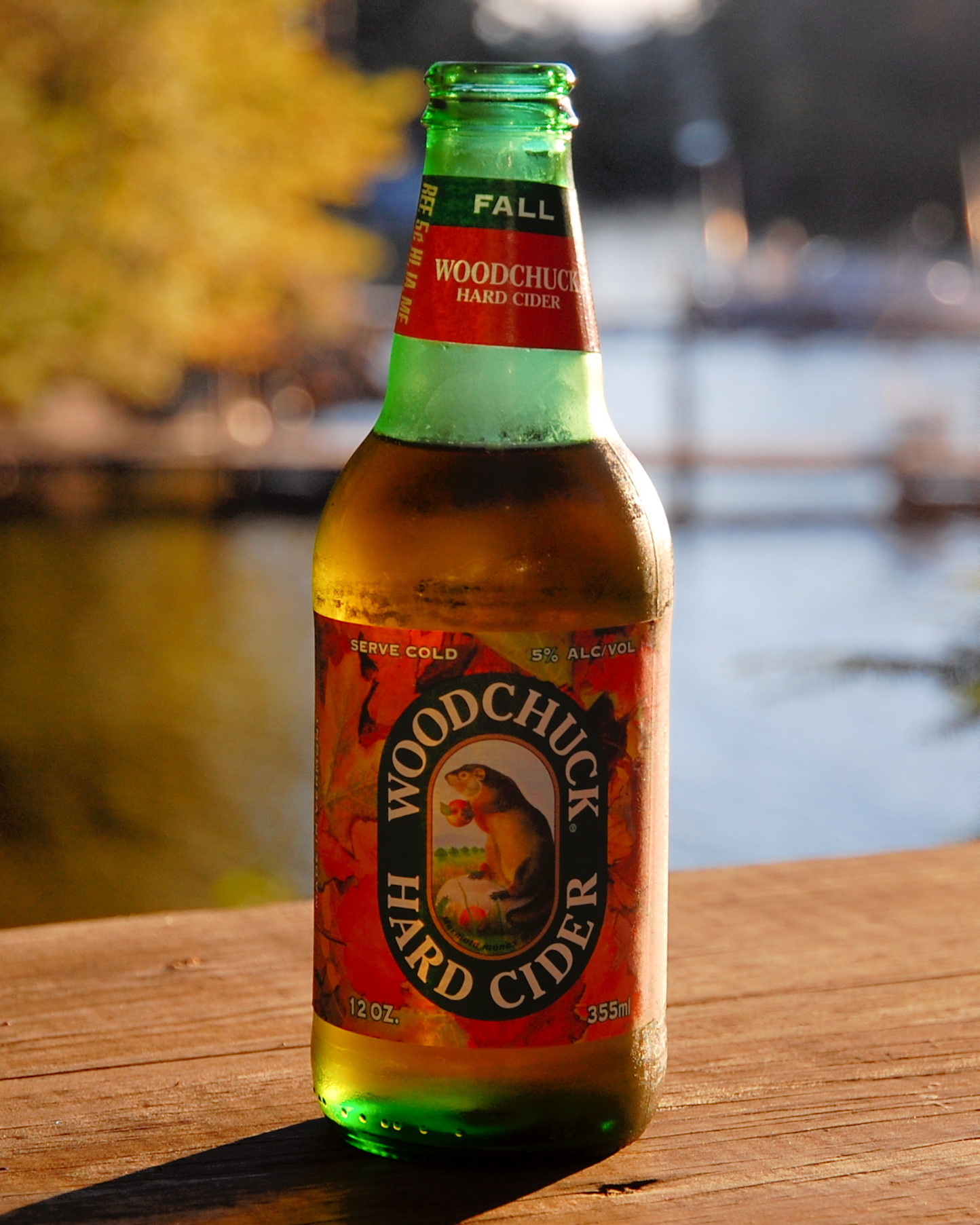
- Company type: Private
- Founded: 1991
- Founder: Joe Cerniglia, Barry Blake, and Greg Failing
- Headquarters: Middlebury, Vermont
- Website: https://www.woodchuck.com/

Woodchuck Hard Cider is a brand of hard cider produced by the Vermont Hard Cider Company, LLC, in Middlebury, Vermont. In 2011 it was the top-selling hard cider in the United States, capturing approximately 47% of the hard cider market in the country.

== History ==
Woodchuck was founded at The Joseph Cerniglia Winery in Proctorsville, Vermont, in 1991 by Joe Cerniglia and Barry Blake, along with wine maker Greg Failing. While cider production began in Cerniglia's winery, by 1996 the company was producing 400,000 cases of product per year, necessitating a move to a cidery in Springfield, Vermont.

In 2000, Woodchuck moved to its current production facility in Middlebury, Vermont, and by 2007 had become the first cider company in the nation to sell one million cases in one year. In 2012, Woodchuck Hard Cider was purchased by Irish beverage company C&C Group.

In March 2021, C&C Group announced their intent to sell Vermont Hard Cider Company to Northeast Drinks Group, a Vermont-based company, for 20 million dollars. According to executive David Mandler, the group was founded specifically in order to procure Vermont Hard Cider Company, and all employees and contracts will remain in place upon purchase. The sale was officially completed in April 2021.

== Varieties ==
Woodchuck currently offers ten core styles available in either bottles or cans, with the option to purchase a variety pack that comes with a combination of flavors. The company also offers a low calorie variety pack containing four fruit-flavored ciders, as well as a single cider in the company's 802 Collection, a product line that focuses on using solely Vermont-sourced apples at all levels of productions.

All Woodchuck ciders are made from apples and other fruits, and are therefore gluten-free as there is no grain involved in production process.

== Limited releases ==
Beginning in 2008, Woodchuck released multiple limited-edition products that corresponded with the time of year. In 2018, the seasonal releases were scrapped as Woodchuck unveiled the Tank Series, a line of limited-release ciders that would enter the market for roughly four months before being replaced with a new product.

- Spring – Hard cider flavored with locally sourced maple syrup and brown sugar. This product was released in Spring 2011.
- Belgian White – Hard cider brewed with Belgian beer yeast. Originally released in 2012 in Woodchuck's Private Reserve line, this product was brought back as a limited release in Winter 2019 due to constant requests from consumers.
- Pumpkin – Oak aged hard cider flavored with pumpkins. This product was released in Fall 2019, and crafted with a similar formula to the company's Private Reserve Pumpkin Cider first released in 2010.

== Private reserves ==
Woodchuck's Private Reserve line was first unveiled in 2010 with the launch of Private Reserve Pumpkin, a hard cider which they claimed to be the world's first pumpkin cider. Other releases include the Private Reserve Barrel Select, a product aged for six months in oak bourbon barrels along with a Woodchuck Belgian White, a cider that's produced using Belgian beer yeast.
