= Black Gilliflower (apple) =

Apple cultivar

Malus domestica 'Black Gilliflower'
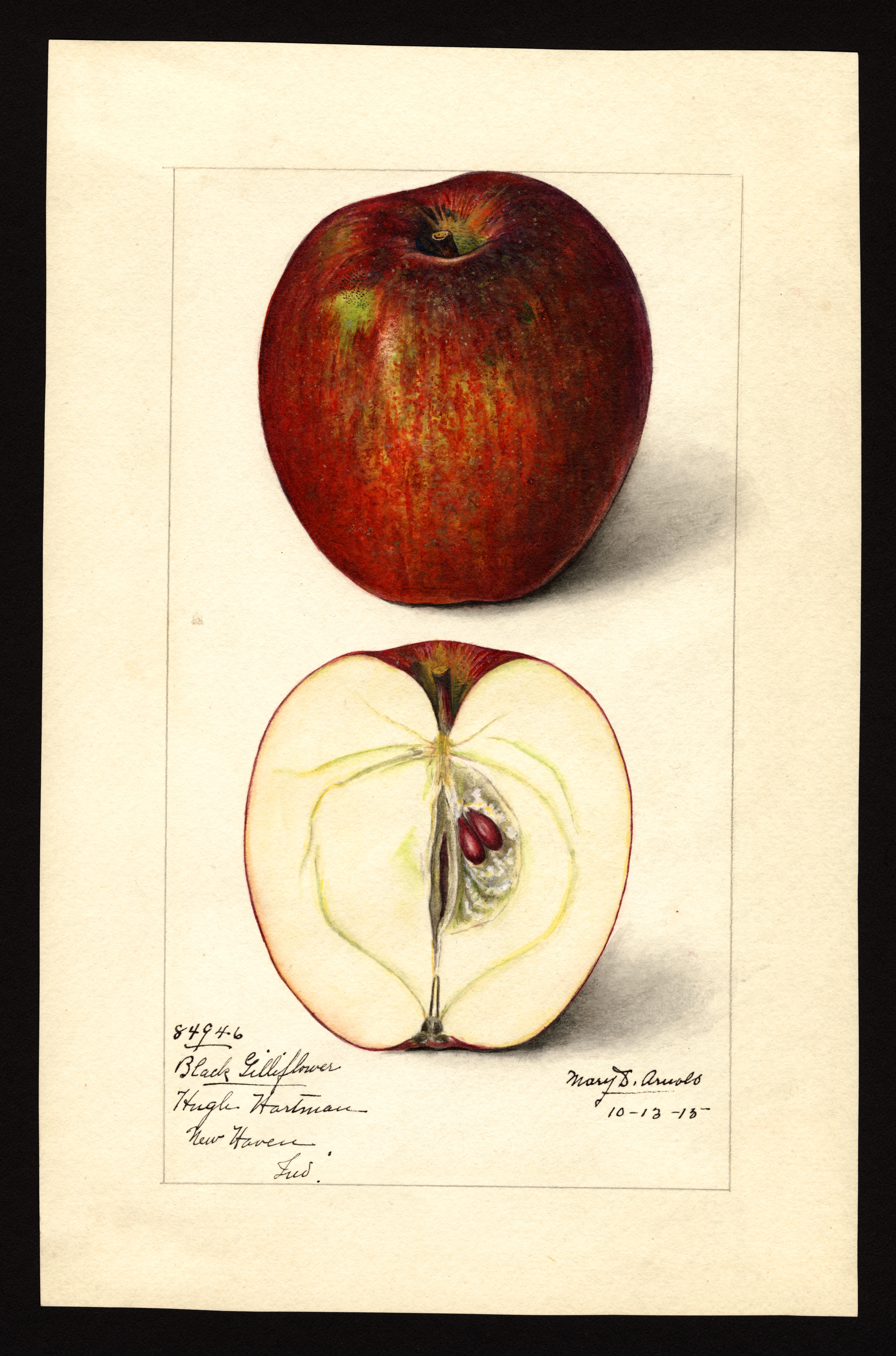
- Cultivar: 'Black Gilliflower'
- Origin: unknown, USA, before 1800

The Black Gilliflower is an apple cultivar also called simply 'Gilliflower', believed to have originated in the US in the 18th century.
