= Cedar Creek (James River tributary) =

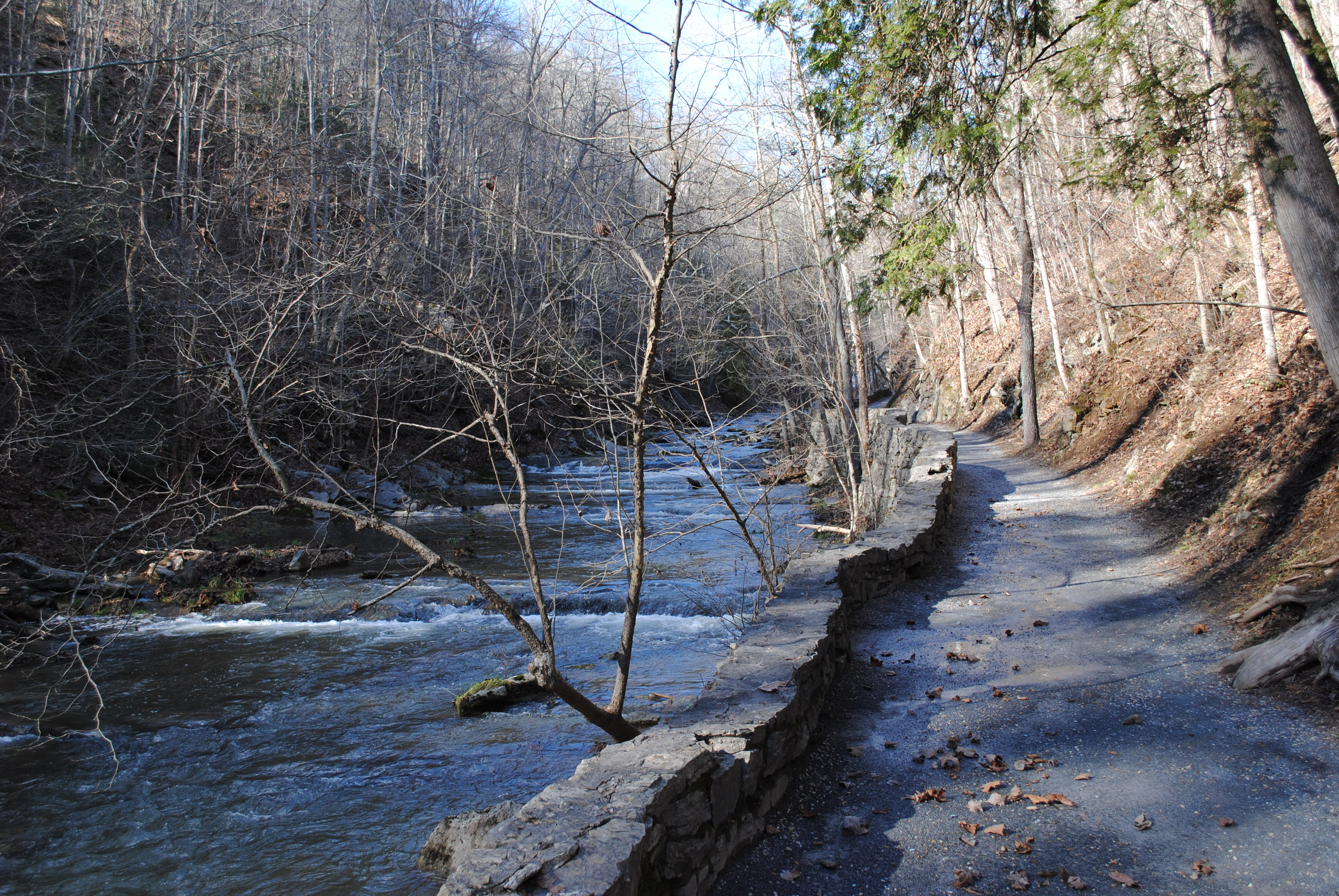
- Cedar Creek, adjacent the Cedar Creek Trail

Location
- Country: United States
- State: Virginia
- Counties: Rockbridge County, Botetourt County

Physical characteristics
- Source
  - location: Short Hills Wildlife Management Area, Botetourt County
  - coordinates: 37°37′36″N 79°38′22″W
- Mouth: James River
  - location: Gilmore Mills, Rockbridge County
  - coordinates: 37°36′29″N 79°32′33″W
- Length: 12.0 mi (19.3 km)

Cedar Creek is a 12.0-mile-long (19.3 km) tributary of the James River in the U.S. state of Virginia. It is notable for flowing through the Natural Bridge rock formation, a National Historic Landmark.

== Course ==
The creek rises at the Rockbridge-Botetourt County line near the crest of the Short Hills within the Short Hills Wildlife Management Area, and flows northeast for three miles (4.8 km) along the ridgecrest before dropping off the mountain to the east. Upon reaching the base of the mountain ridge, Cedar Creek turns south, then southeast, flowing under Interstate 81, then flowing under the Natural Bridge, which carries U.S. Route 11. The creek continues south two miles (3 km) farther, reaching the James River at Gilmore Mills.

== Cedar Creek Trail ==
The Cedar Creek Trail runs alongside Cedar Creek for one and a quarter miles (2 km), allowing visitors to see the bridge and other places of interest, including a Native American village, Saltpeter Cave, the Lost River, and Lace Falls.

== See also ==
- List of rivers of Virginia
