= Cider Making (painting) =

Painting by William Sidney Mount

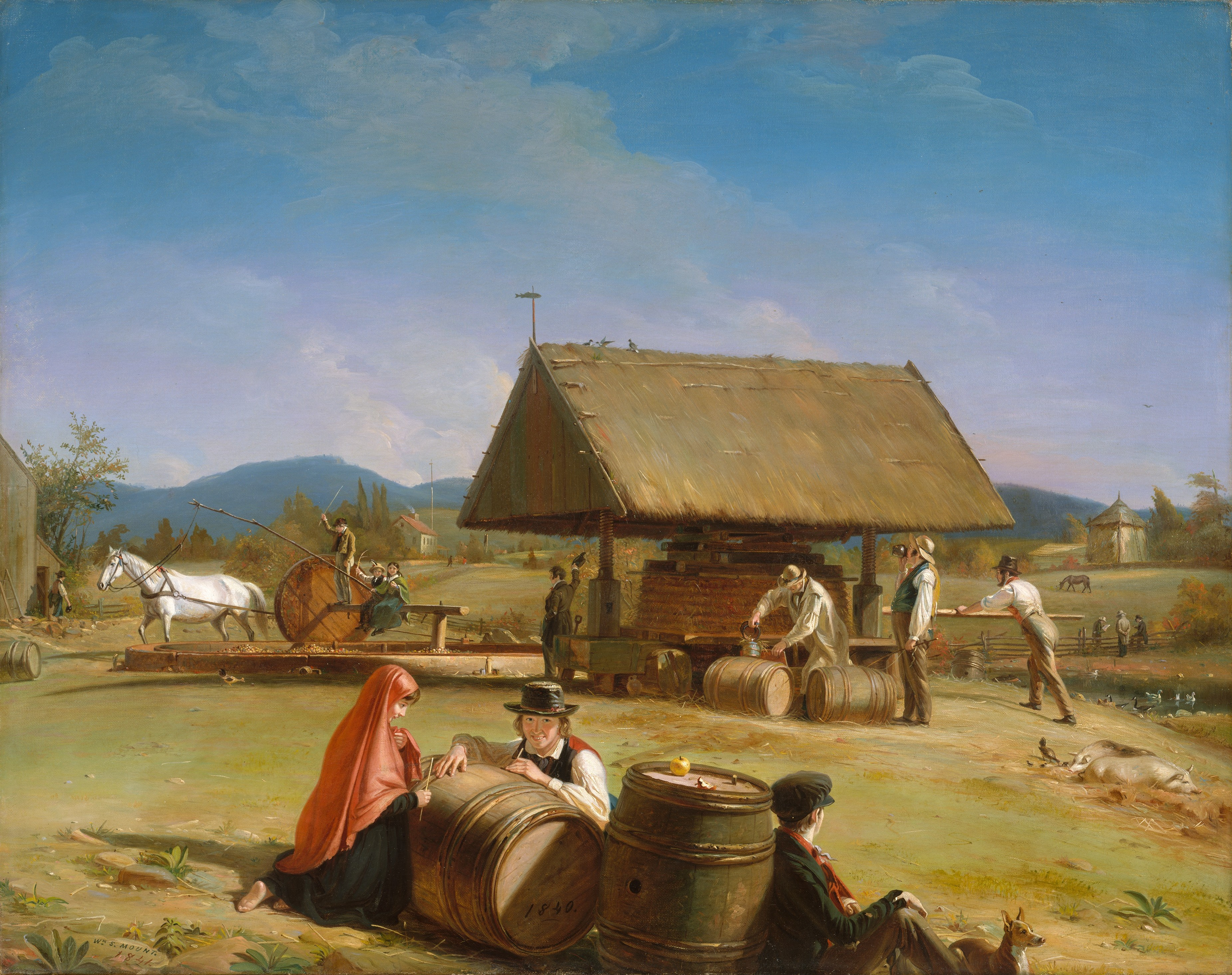
- Artist: William Sidney Mount
- Year: 1840–1841
- Medium: Oil on canvas
- Dimensions: 68.6 cm × 86.7 cm (27.0 in × 34.1 in)
- Location: Metropolitan Museum of Art; New York City
- Accession: 66.126

Cider Making is a mid 19th-century painting by American artist William Sidney Mount. Done in oil on canvas, the painting depicts the making of cider at a cider mill on Long Island. Mount's work is in the collection of the Metropolitan Museum of Art.

== Description ==
Cider Making was painted by William Sidney Mount in either 1840 or 1841. The painting can be seen as a political work; Mount, a conservative democrat, was strongly opposed to the presidency of Andrew Jackson and his successor Martin Van Buren, whose political opponent William Henry Harrison often used rural imagery to criticize the former. Harrison's Whig Party was also commonly associated with cider makers.

The cider mill depicted in the painting was located in Setauket, Long Island, and was in operation until the early 20th century. Mount was paid $250 for the painting.
