= Redstreak =

Apple cultivar

'Redstreak'
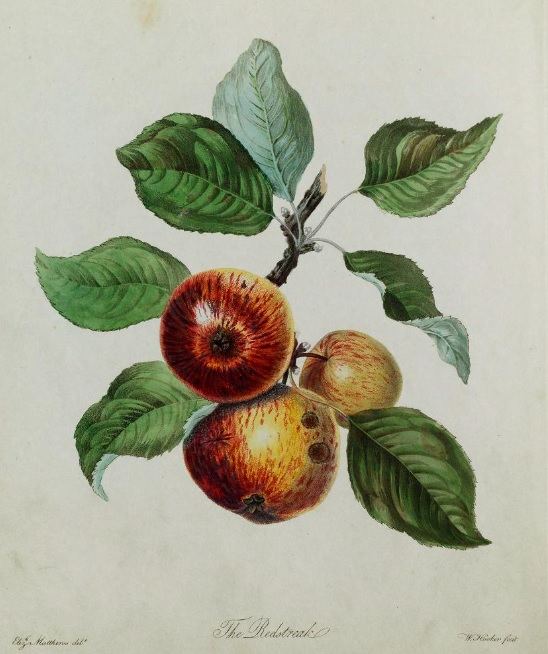
- Species: Malus domestica
- Breeder: John Scudamore, 1st Viscount Scudamore
- Origin: England, 1600s.

The Redstreak, also spelt Redstrake, Red Streak or Red-streak, is or was a very old variety of cider apple formerly commonly planted in England.

It is sometimes referred to as the Herefordshire Redstreak or Old Redstreak to distinguish it from later-developed varieties, such as the Somerset Redstreak, with a similar name.

== History ==
The variety is traditionally said to have first appeared in the early 17th century; John Evelyn recorded that it was originally named the "Scudamore Crab", having first been intensively planted by the diplomat and politician John Scudamore, 1st Viscount Scudamore. Scudamore's efforts in improving and raising fruit trees on his estate at Holme Lacy were an attempt to match the superior French cider available at the time. Scudamore had been ambassador to France, and supposedly raised this apple from a pip brought back from there.

During the 17th century, the Redstreak (as the apple was later to become known) became celebrated as the finest cider apple variety in England, and was the source of Herefordshire's reputation as the premier cider-producing region in the country. Scudamore himself assisted in popularising the drink, having tall, elegant glasses for it engraved with his and the royal arms, and setting up large-scale production at Holme Lacy, where the cider was bottled and kept in water-cooled cellars.

For a time cider made from Redstreak apples changed hands at extraordinarily high prices - as high as the best imported wine - but by the late 18th century the variety was already in decline. By the 19th century the Redstreak was reported to be almost extinct, much like the Styre, another formerly well-known cider apple variety that had suffered from an apparent decline in quality and productiveness. Thomas Knight's Pomona Herefordiensis (1811), noted that "trees of the Red-streak can now no longer be propagated; and the fruit, like the trees, is affected by the debilitated old age of the variety, and has in a very considerable degree, survived those qualities to which it was owing its former fame".

This decline may have occurred in older apple cultivars as viruses gradually built up in their tissues over time and were transferred during propagation, with increasing negative effects on productiveness, vigour and even flavour.

"Herefordshire Redstreak" apples are currently available from some nurseries, but it is unclear whether these are related to the original variety, which may now be extinct.

== Characteristics ==
William Marshall, in his late 18th-century Observations on the Management of Orchards and Fruit Liquor in Herefordshire, noted that only a "few old trees" of the Old Redstreak remained, and that the fruit was "small, roundish, of a pale yellow ground, with numerous faint red streaks; the flesh firm, full of juice, and when ripe, finely flavoured". The tree's habit was described as "singularly awkward [...] ragged and unsightly".

The Redstreak was classed as a "bittersweet" cider apple variety, and indeed was the first of the bittersweet varieties to appear in England: the second generation of bittersweet (or "French") varieties, such as Dymock Red, were produced from it.
