= Natural Bridge (Virginia) =

State park in Virginia, United States

- U.S. National Register of Historic Places
- U.S. National Historic Landmark
- The Natural Bridge

- Location within Shenandoah Valley Location within Virginia Location within the United States
- Nearest city: Natural Bridge, Virginia
- Coordinates: 37°37′39″N 79°32′43″W
- Part of: Natural Bridge Historic District (ID15001047)
- NRHP reference No.: 97001401

Significant dates
- Added to NRHP: November 18, 1997
- Designated NHL: August 6, 1998

Natural Bridge is a geological formation in Rockbridge County, Virginia, United States, comprising a 215-foot-high (66 m) natural arch with a span of 90 feet (27 m). It is situated within a gorge carved from the surrounding mountainous limestone terrain by Cedar Creek, a small tributary of the James River. Consisting of horizontal limestone strata, Natural Bridge is the remains of the roof of a cave or tunnel through which the Cedar Creek once flowed.

Natural Bridge has been designated a Virginia Historic Landmark and a National Historic Landmark. Since 2016, the bridge and its surroundings have been managed by the Commonwealth of Virginia as Natural Bridge State Park.

== Geology ==
Rocks in the area are limestones and dolomites from the Ordovician Period, which implies deposition about 470 million years ago.

The carbonates of the Natural Bridge occur within the Chepultepec Formation, making the buttress of the bridge, and the Beekmantown Formation, deposited conformably over the Chepultepec and comprising the span and the upper part of the bridge. Strata at Natural Bridge are close to horizontal, in contrast with dipping and folded beds as close as 300 feet (91 m) away along Highway 11, which points to the fact that structurally the rocks making the Natural Bridge are the bottom part of a syncline.

The process of formation of the bridge is less certain, but the ideas proposed by different individuals have in common the importance of three elements: The southeast dipping of the strata, the capability of water to slowly dissolve carbonates, and the existence of numerous fractures. Edgar W. Spencer has provided a summary of the most respected interpretations and produced the presently most widely accepted hypothesis.

According to Spencer, the Natural Bridge was the remnant of an underground river tunnel that diverted water to the south. Initially, the underground river started capturing water from the Poague Run about two miles (3.2 km) to the north, contributing to enlarge the incipient Cedar Creek drainage basin. Over time, through weathering and erosion, the underground river collapsed and disappeared almost completely, the Natural Bridge being the only surviving relic of the roof of the ancient underground river. The creek's larger flow contributed to form the present-day gorge, significantly increasing the distance from the bottom of the water flow to the roof of the underground channel. Today, the "Lost River", about one-half mile (0.80 km) upstream from the Natural Bridge, is an example supporting the hypothesis of the underground river. Water from the side of the gorge flows into the Cedar Creek, similarly as the ancestral Cedar Creek underground river allegedly flowed into the Cascade Creek, presently entering the Cedar Creek approximately 500 feet (150 m) below the Natural Bridge.

Historic Rockbridge indicates that “Natural Bridge is part of the Beekmantown Formation from the Ordovician period, estimated to be 500 million years old.”

== History ==
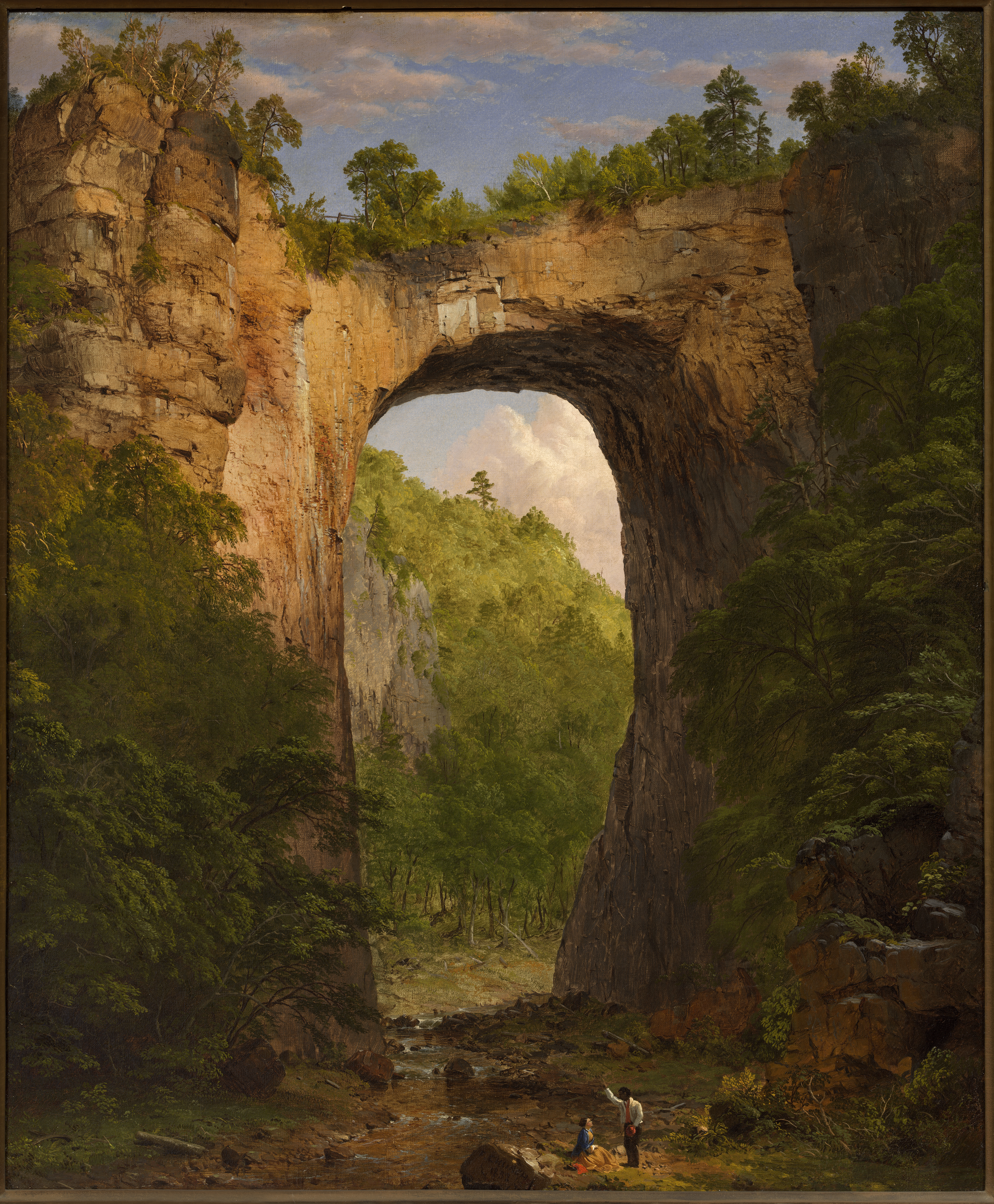
Natural Bridge by Frederic Edwin Church, 1852

The Natural Bridge was a sacred site of the Native American Monacan tribe, who believed it to be the site of a major victory over pursuing Powhatans centuries before the arrival of Europeans in Virginia.

In March 1742, a frontiersman named John Howard—along with his son and others—was commissioned by Governor William Gooch to explore the southwest of Virginia as far as the Mississippi River. The party followed Cedar Creek through the Natural Bridge, then floated in buffalo-skin boats down the New, Coal, Kanawha, and Ohio rivers to the Mississippi.

It is alleged that George Washington also came to the site in 1750 as a young surveyor. To support claims that Washington surveyed the area, tour guides claim the initials "G.W." on the wall of the bridge, 23 feet (7.0 m) up, were carved by the future president. Legend also has it that George Washington threw a rock from the bottom of Cedar Creek over the bridge. In 1927, a large stone was found, also engraved "G.W." and bearing a surveyor's cross, which historians accepted as proof that he indeed surveyed the bridge.

Thomas Jefferson purchased 157 acres (64 ha) of land including the Natural Bridge from King George III of Great Britain for 20 shillings in 1774. He called it "the most Sublime of nature's works". Jefferson built a two-room log cabin, with one room reserved for guests, beginning its use as a retreat. While President, in 1802, he personally surveyed the area. Many famous guests stayed here, including John Marshall, James Monroe, Henry Clay, Sam Houston, and Martin Van Buren.

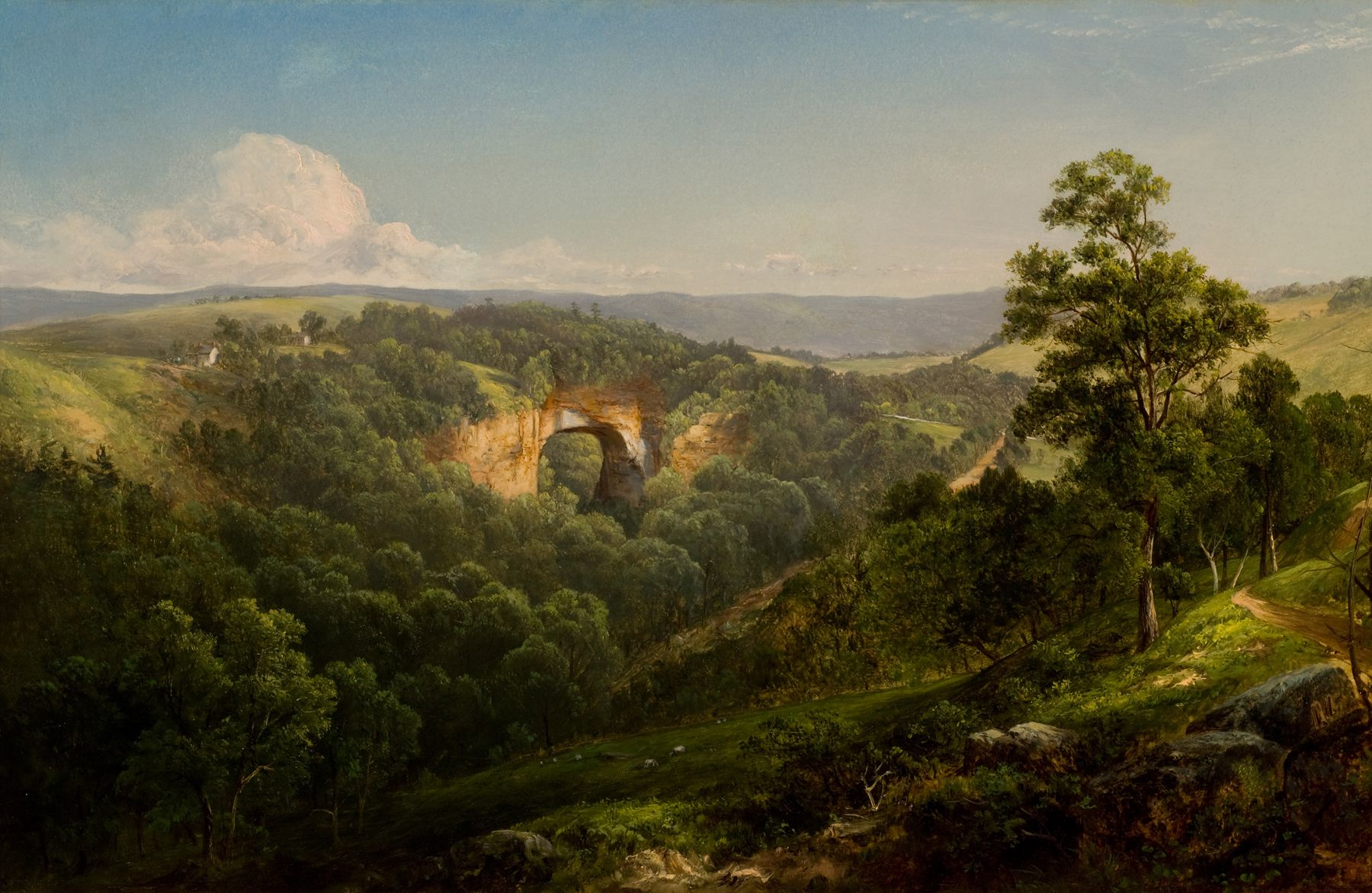
Natural Bridge, Virginia, oil on canvas, David Johnson, 1860. Reynolda House

One of the earliest paintings of the Natural Bridge was done by Jacob Caleb Ward (1809–1891) in 1835. It is on view at the Nelson-Atkins Museum in Kansas City, Missouri.

Natural Bridge was one of the tourist attractions of the new world that Europeans visited during the 18th and 19th centuries. Vacationing guests from all over the world took day trips from Natural Bridge on horseback or horse-drawn carriages to explore the countryside. In 1833, a new owner erected the Forest Inn to accommodate the increasing number of people.

The bridge had considerable notoriety during the 19th century. Herman Melville alluded to the bridge in describing Moby-Dick: "But soon the fore part of him slowly rose from the water; for an instant his whole marbleized body formed a high arch, like Virginia's Natural Bridge..." William Cullen Bryant, another American literary figure, said that Natural Bridge and Niagara Falls were the two most remarkable features of North America. During the 1880s Natural Bridge was a resort owned by Colonel Henry Parsons, who also owned the nearby Rockbridge Inn.

In 1927 a nocturnal lighting display of the arch and gorge was designed by Samuel Hibben and Phinehas V. Stephens, illuminating engineers with the Westinghouse Company. The display was formally switched on by President Calvin Coolidge in a 1927 inaugural ceremony. The original display has since been replaced with a sound and light show depicting the biblical seven days of the Creation as described in Genesis.

In 2013, nearly 1,500 acres (6.1 km^{2}), including the bridge, were slated to be sold at auction. To prevent piecemeal development of the landmark, the Virginia Conservation Legacy Fund (VCLF) purchased the bridge, hotel, and surrounding land for $9.1 million, made possible by a loan from the Virginia Clean Water Revolving Loan Fund. When the VCLF soon found itself unable to make payments on that loan, the Commonwealth of Virginia offered to manage the property as a Virginia State Park.

== Natural Bridge State Park ==
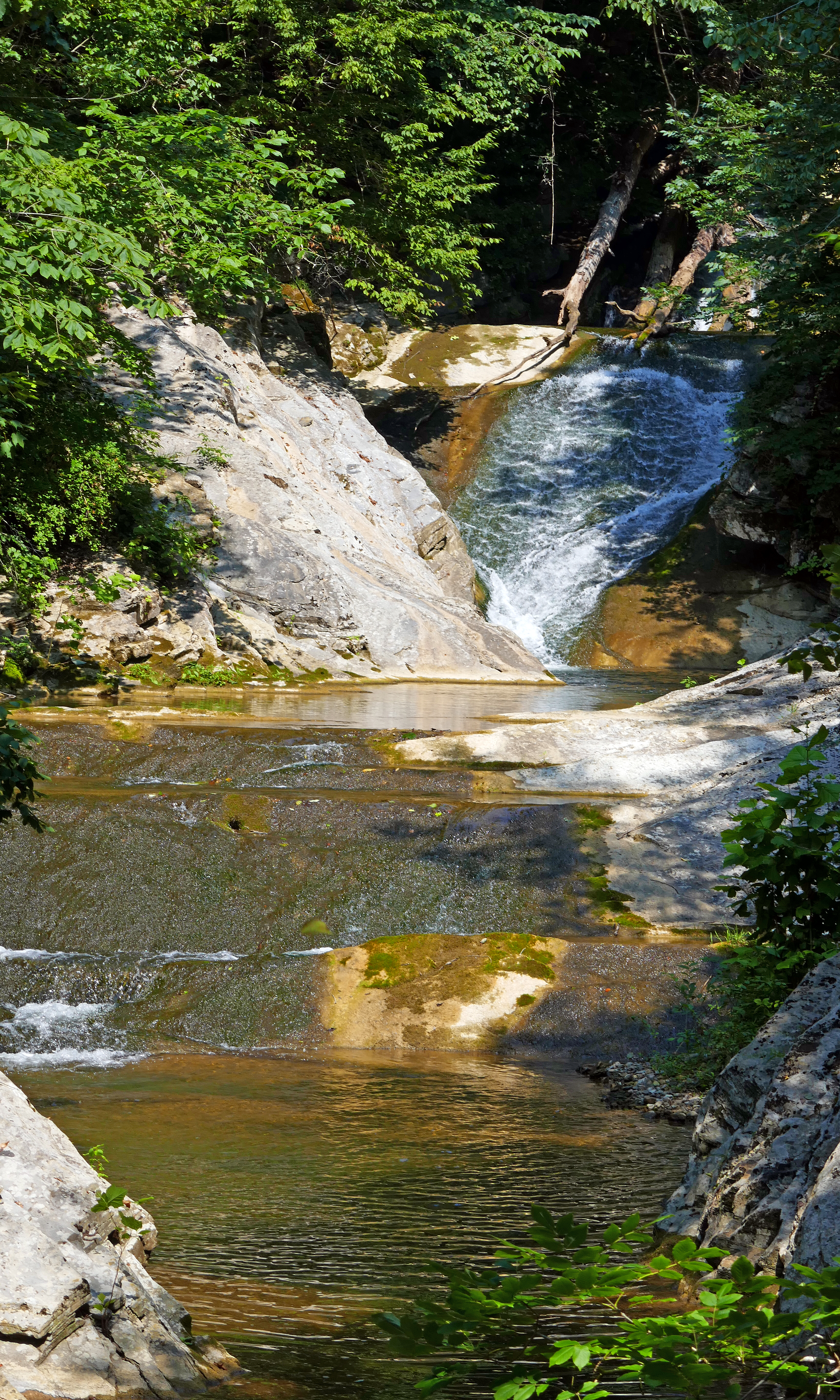
Lace Falls on Cedar Creek in Natural Bridge State Park, Rockbridge County, Virginia.

Natural Bridge State Park officially opened on September 24, 2016. As a state park, the property is owned and managed by the Virginia Department of Conservation and Recreation.

Visitors must purchase tickets to view the bridge from below, although the park's fees under state management are about half what had been charged under prior ownership. U.S. Route 11 (Lee Highway) runs on top of the bridge, but protective fences make it difficult to see anything besides the roadway.

The state park includes several long-standing attractions, including the trail under the bridge along Cedar Creek and the 30-foot-tall (9.1 m) Lace Falls. One change under state ownership was the removal of Foamhenge, a full-size replica of Stonehenge made entirely out of styrofoam that was formerly located on the property. The attraction was moved to Fairfax County after it was determined that the art installation did not fit with the state park's mission.

The new state park was designated an "Affiliated Area" by the National Park Service in 2016. The designation does not imply ownership or management by the federal government, though it does allow for their technical and financial assistance.

== See also ==
- List of bridges on the National Register of Historic Places in Virginia
- List of National Historic Landmarks in Virginia
- List of Virginia state parks
- National Register of Historic Places listings in Rockbridge County, Virginia
