= Crispin (disambiguation) =

Crispin may refer to:

== People ==
- Crispin (given name)
- Crispin (surname)
- Crispin and Crispinian, Christian saints
- Crispin of Pavia, Bishop of Pavia and saint
- Crispin (bishop of Csanád)
- Crispin of Viterbo (1668–1750), Italian saint and member of the Order of Friars Minor Capuchin

== Ships ==
- SS Crispin (1907), a cargo ship built in 1907 and sunk in 1917
- HMS Crispin (1940), a cargo ship and ocean boarding vessel launched in 1934 and sunk in 1941
- HMS Crispin, a destroyer launched in 1945 and renamed PNS Jahangir in 1956

== Books ==
- Crispin: The Cross of Lead, a 2002 children's novel
- Crispin: At the Edge of the World, a 2006 children's novel
- Crispin: The Pig Who Had It All, a 2000 picture book by Ted Dewan

== Characters ==
- Crispin (Shannara), a character in Terry Brooks' Shannara novels
- Crispin (wizard), a character in King's Quest V: Absence Makes the Heart Go Yonder! video game
- Crispin, a character in The Mistmantle Chronicles by M. I. McAllister
- Crispin, a supporting character from the 2003 film Daddy Day Care
- Crispin, a character from the visual novel Class of '09

== Other uses ==
- Crispin (apple) or Mutsu apple, a cross between the Golden Delicious and the Indo apple varieties
- Crispin Hard Cider Company
- Crispin School, a secondary school in Street, Somerset, England
- Crispin, the subject of Wallace Stevens' long poem "The Comedian as the Letter 'C'"
- Crispin, a trade name for tramadol

== See also ==
- St Crispins Hospital, a psychiatric hospital in Duston, Northamptonshire, England
- St Crispin's School, a co-educational comprehensive school in Wokingham, Berkshire, England
- Crispin rival de son maître, a one-act farce by Alain-René Lesage that was first produced in 1707
- Order of the Knights of St. Crispin, American labor union of shoeworkers
- Saint Crispin's Day, the feast day of the Christian saints Crispin and Crispinian
- St Crispin Street Fair, annual fun fair held in town centre streets of Northampton, England
- Crispian
- Crispiano, town and comune in southeast Italy
