= Crespin (surname) =

Crespin is a surname. A Spanish variant of the name is Crespín. Notable people with the surname include:

- Augusto Crespin (born 1956), Salvadoran artist
- Elias Crespin (born 1965), Venezuelan kinetic artist
- Irene Crespin (1896–1980), Australian geologist and micropalaeontologist
- Jean Crespin (c. 1520–1572), French Protestant lawyer and printer
- Marie-José Crespin (1936–2025), Senegalese magistrate
- Rafaela Crespín Rubio (born 1976), Spanish politician
- Régine Crespin (1927–2007), French soprano
- Renée Crespin du Bec (died 1659), Countess de Gebriand, the first female ambassador in the history of France

== See also ==
- Crespin Carlier (c. 1560–1636), French organ builder
- Joe Benny Corona Crespín, known as Joe Corona (born 1990), American soccer player
- Crispin (surname), people with this surname
