= Stephen J. Challacombe =

Professor of oral medicine

Stephen J. Challacombe FRC(Path), FDSRCS, FMedSci
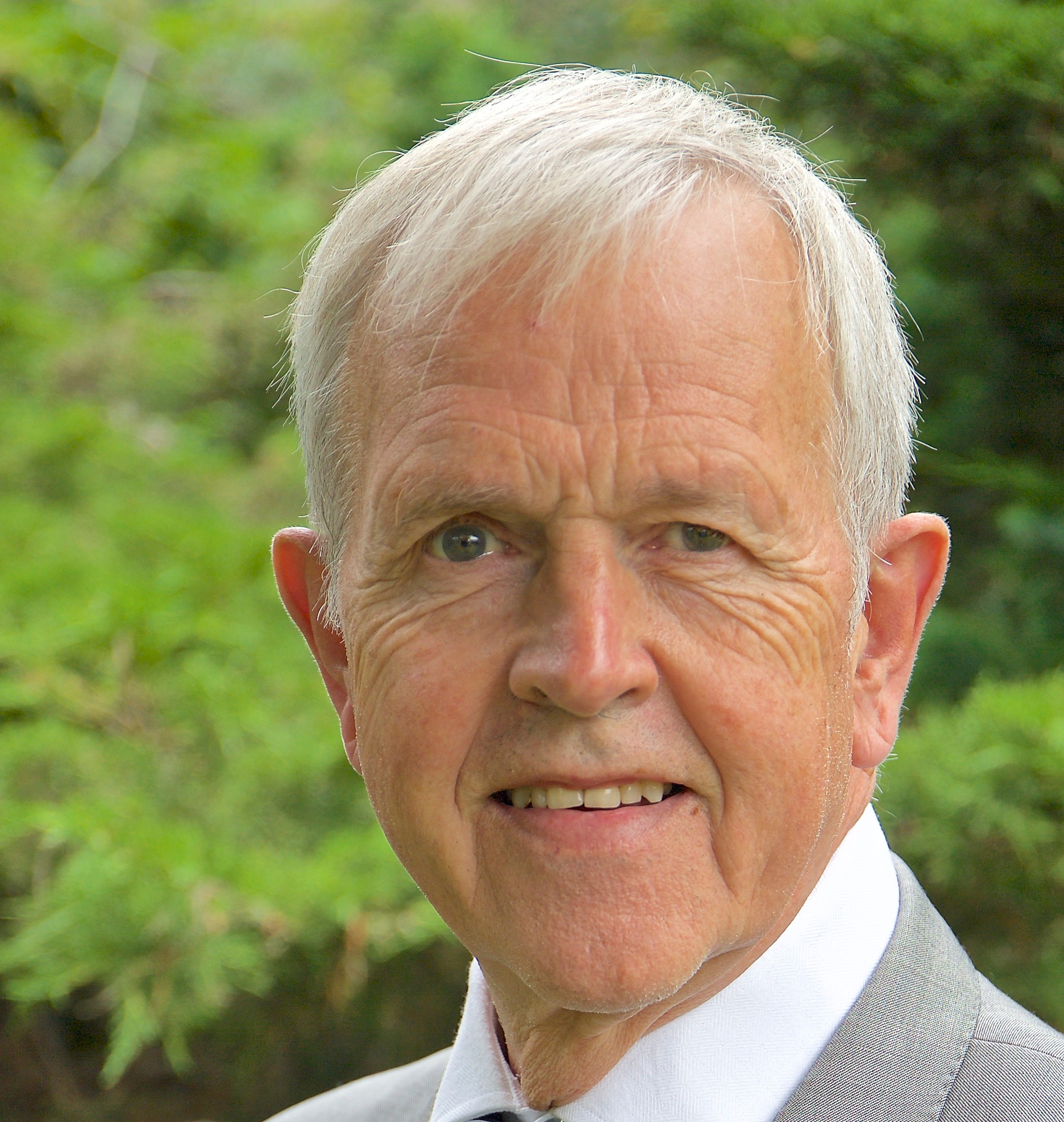
- Professor Stephen Challacombe (2019)
- Born: April 1946 (age 80)
- Education: Guy's Hospital Dental School
- Known for: Challacombe scale; Oral health
- Spouse: Tina
- Children: 2
- Scientific career
- Fields: Oromucosal immunology; Global health inequalities
- Workplaces: King's College, London; UMDS; Guy's Hospital

Stephen James Challacombe (born April 1946) is professor of oral medicine at King's College in London, best known for research in oromucosal immunology and for developing the Challacombe scale for measuring the extent of dryness of the mouth. He led the team that laid out research challenges of global health inequalities and oral health, particularly relating to the oral manifestations of HIV.

Challacombe was the Martin Rushton Professor of Oral Medicine at King's College, London and the University of London, a consultant in diagnostic microbiology and immunology to Guys & St Thomas Hospitals, and Dean for external affairs at King's College London Health Schools.

He has been an author, co-author, editor and co-editor of a number of publications and a recipient of several awards and fellowships. Medical societies of which he has been president include the International Association for Dental Research, British Society for Oral and Dental Research, European Association of Oral Medicine and the Hunterian Society, and the world's oldest rugby club, Guy's Hospital RFC.

== Early life ==
Stephen Challacombe was born in April 1946. He attended Culford School, where he played sports including rugby.

== Mucosal immunology ==
Challacombe initially worked in the field of immunology. In 1978, he was appointed assistant professor and senior research fellow in the Department of Immunology at the Mayo Clinic in the United States, and completed the fellowship in 1979.

From 1984 to 2011, Challacombe was consultant in diagnostic microbiology and immunology to Guys & St Thomas Hospitals. During this time, he became professor of oral medicine in the department of Oral Medicine and Pathology at Guy's Hospital in 1986 and the Martin Rushton Professor of oral medicine in 1988.

== Later career ==
Challacombe was appointed Director of External Strategy at the Dental Institute in 2005 and a year later became Dean for King's College London KCL External Affairs, holding both posts until 2011.

His experience has also included coordinating conferences and university departments, managing grants, finances and research, and teaching.

=== Challacombe scale ===
Challacombe developed the Challacombe scale for measuring the extent of dryness of the mouth in human beings. It was launched in 2011 at Tylney Hall in Hampshire and has become widely used as a medical tool for assessing and monitoring dry mouth.

=== Global oral health ===
Challacombe became involved in clinical research in oral HIV and AIDS, and has chaired international workshops on the oral manifestations of HIV infection in the UK, South Africa, Thailand, China, and India. In 1991 and 1993, he contributed to the consensus meeting on the classification of oral lesions in HIV. He was chairman of the International Steering Committee on Oral Health and Disease in HIV infection between 2000 and 2017.

In 2011, Challacombe led the team that laid out research challenges of global health inequalities and oral health, particularly relating to Noma, tuberculosis, sexually transmitted disease and HIV, four of the most serious global oral health infections. With regards to clinical signs in the mouth in AIDS, he identified a significant role for dentists.

Later, using Sierra Leone as a case study to develop oral health programmes in low-income countries, he worked with the King's Sierra Leone Partnership's dentistry section, as a member of The Kings Centre for Global Health.

In 2020, he co-authored a review which proposed using povidone-iodine to reduce cross-infectivity of COVID-19, and highlighted the role of saliva in the transmission of the disease.

=== History of medicine ===
As a historian of medicine, his lectures have included a series on the London medical students at Belsen.

== Awards and honours ==
=== Awards ===
Challacombe is a recipient of a number of awards including:

- Colgate (Hatton) Research Prize, British Division, IADR (1977)
- Kendall-Hench Research Fellowship, Mayo Clinic, Minnesota, USA (1978)
- Basic Research in Oral Science Award, IADR. (1981)
- Distinguished Scientist Award for Experimental Pathology, IADR, (1997)
- DSc (h.c.), University of Athens (2012)
- American Academy of Oral Medicine Samuel Charles Miller award (2018)
- Distinguished Alumni Award of the Mayo Clinic (2017).

=== Presidencies ===
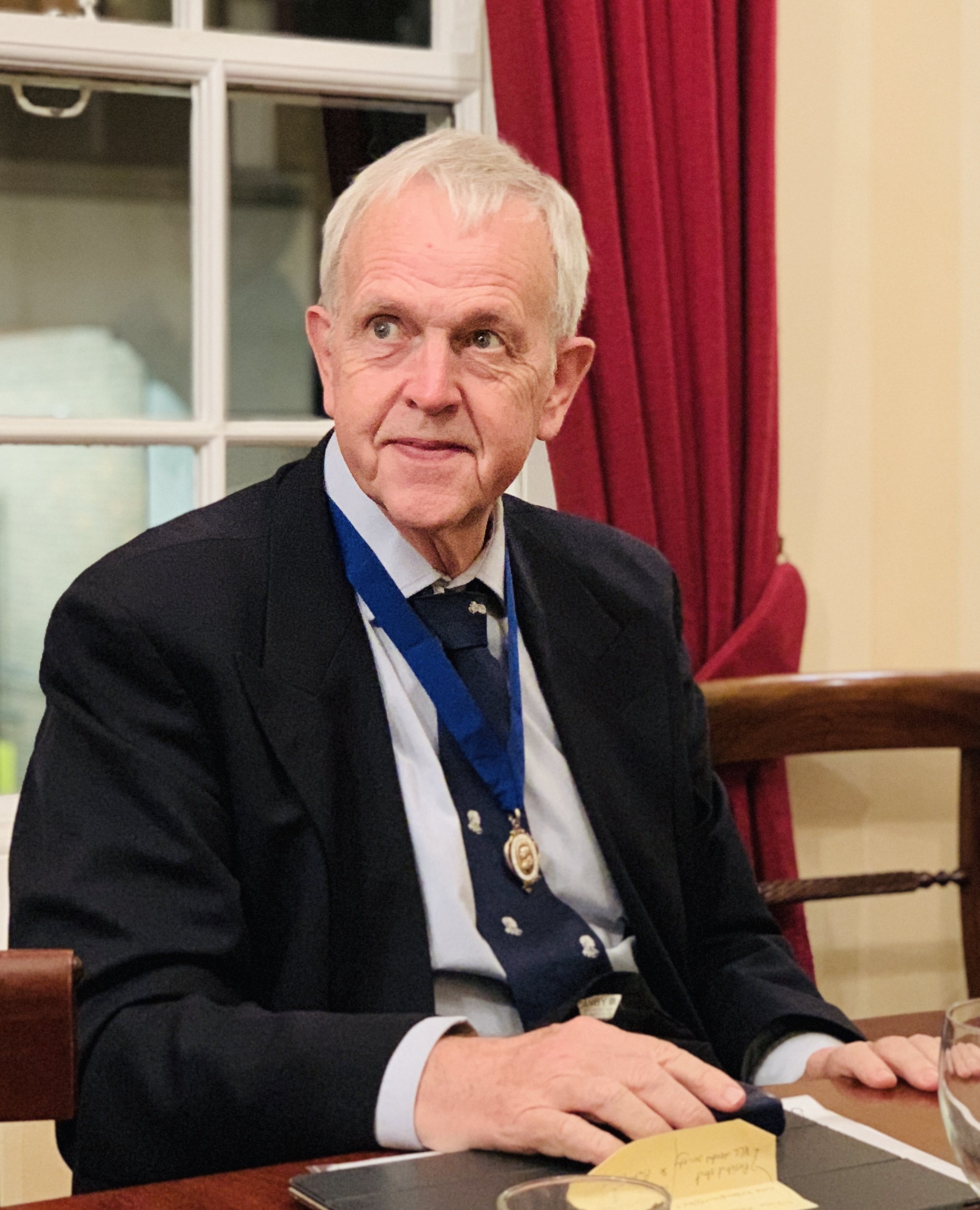
Stephen Challacombe, Hunterian Society (October 2019)

He has been president of:

- International Association for Dental Research (IADR) (2003)
- British Society for Oral and Dental Research (2000–02)
- British Society for Oral Medicine (1996–98)
- Odontological section of Royal Society of Medicine (1997–98)
- British Dental Association (BDA) Metropolitan Branch (2000–01)
- European Association of Oral Medicine (2008–10)
- Hunterian Society (2006-7), (2018–19)
- History of Medicine Society (2019–20)

He has also been president of the world's oldest rugby club, Guy's Hospital RFC.

=== Chairmanships ===
He was chairman of:

- International steering committee on Oral Health & Disease in AIDS (2000–17)
- Mucosal immunology group of the British Society for Immunology (1987-1992)
- NIDCR OHARA External Experts Advisory panel (2007- 2013)

=== Fellowships ===
He is a fellow of the:

- Royal College of Pathologists
- Royal College of Surgeons of Edinburgh
- Academy of Medical Sciences, United Kingdom (1998)
- King's College, London (2010)
- Royal College of Surgeons of England

== Personal life ==
He is married to Tina and they have two children.

In 2013, he joined the Board of Governors of Culford School. He also continues to support students of the world's oldest rugby club, Guy's Hospital RFC.

== Writing ==
He has been an author, co-author, editor and co-editor of a number of publications including nine books, over 240 peer-reviewed research papers and 160 other works on various aspects of oral and maxillofacial medicine. These have included publications on induction of secretory immune responses, oral tolerance and on immunological aspects of the oral cavity. His interest on mucosal immunity in HIV and how HIV can present with signs in the mouth, has resulted in over 25 research articles.

=== Selected publications ===
==== Articles ====
- Challacombe, S J; Tomasi, T B (1 December 1980). "Systemic tolerance and secretory immunity after oral immunization". Journal of Experimental Medicine. 152 (6). Rockefeller University Press: 1459–1472. doi:10.1084/jem.152.6.1459. ISSN 0022-1007. PMC 2186016. PMID 7452148. S2CID 17098839.
- Challacombe, S. J. (1983). "SALIVARY ANTIBODIES AND SYSTEMIC TOLERANCE IN MICE AFTER ORAL IMMUNIZATION WITH BACTERIAL ANTIGENS*". Annals of the New York Academy of Sciences. 409: 177–193. doi:10.1111/j.1749-6632.1983.tb26868.x.
- "Oral mucosal lesions : what the general practitioner needs to know", Wynnum, Qld (2009), DVD-ROM
- Challacombe, S.J. (2011). "Beijing Declaration 2009". Advances in Dental Research. 23. doi:10.1177/0022034511399085.
- Osailan, S.M.; Pramanik, R.; Shirlaw, P.; Proctor, G.B.; Challacombe, S.J. (2012). "Clinical assessment of oral dryness: development of a scoring system related to salivary flow and mucosal wetness". Oral Surgery, Oral Medicine, Oral Pathology and Oral Radiology. 114: 597–603. doi:10.1016/j.oooo.2012.05.009.
- Challacombe, SJ; Tappuni, AR; Ranganathan, K (2016). "The mouth and <scp>AIDS</scp>: lessons learned and emerging challenges in global oral health: introduction". Oral Diseases. 22: 5–6. doi:10.1111/odi.12426.
- Challacombe, SJ (2016). "Global oral inequalities in<scp>HIV</scp>infection". Oral Diseases. 22: 35–41. doi:10.1111/odi.12408.
- Das, P; Challacombe, SJ (2016). "Dry Mouth and Clinical Oral Dryness Scoring Systems". Prim Dent J. 5: 77–79. doi:10.1177/205016841600500110. PMID 29029657.. (With P. Das)
- Ghotane, SG; Challacombe, SJ; Gallagher, JE (2019). "Fortitude and resilience in service of the population: a case study of dental professionals striving for health in Sierra Leone". BDJ Open. 5: 7. doi:10.1038/s41405-019-0011-2. PMC 6513870. PMID 31098298.

==== Books ====
- Advances in Mucosal Immunology : Proceedings of the Fifth International Congress of Mucosal Immunology, co-authored with Thomas T MacDonald, Paul W Bland, Christopher R Stokes, Richard V Heatley, Allan Mcl Mowat Dordrecht, Springer Netherlands, (1990), ISBN 9789400918481, OCLC 840304723
- Food allergy, co-authored with Jonathan Brostoff, Saunders, (1998), Clinics in immunology and allergy, v. 2, no. 1. OCLC 9254958
- Food Allergy and Intolerance, co-authored with Jonathan Brostoff, Saunders (2002) ISBN 9780702020384
- Oral and Maxillofacial Medicine: The Basis of Diagnosis and Treatment, Churchill Livingstone
