= Inspiration FM =

Community radio station in Northampton, United Kingdom

Coordinates: 52.239338°N 0.897768°W

- Northampton; England
- Frequencies: 107.8 MHz and DAB+
- RDS: IFM107.8

Programming
- Format: Multicultural

Ownership
- Owner: Inspiration FM

History
- First air date: 1994 as a Pirate; November 1996 as an RSL; 24 July 2008 with a Community Radio Licence

Links
- Website: Inspiration FM

Inspiration FM is a community radio station based in Northampton, England. It is a community led and managed radio service, providing access, information, entertainment and training, and encourages and promotes a voice for those who are under-represented or socially excluded to provide an outlet for creativity, shared vision and expression.

The station broadcasts from its studios in Northampton town centre. The transmitter for a low-powered transmitter was located offsite at the University of Northampton campus, to north of the town. The transmitter has more recently moved to Goodwill Solutions CIC building on Moulton Park Industrial Estate and then on the roof of Northampton Fire Station. The transmitter is now on the roof of the Nationwide building in Moulton Park. The transmitter has since been moved to their studio in Northampton.

From September 2024, Inspiration FM began broadcasts on DAB+, via the shared small scale Northampton multiplex.

== History ==
The roots of Inspiration FM are as a pirate radio station, that first started broadcasting in 1994 as a result of collaboration between young men and women of African Caribbean descent who shared a passion for music, dance and communication. The "Inspiration Family" as they have become known, identified the needs of the diverse Northamptonshire communities who were under-represented in media. Programmes on this community radio station are multicultural and tailored to reflect its mainly Punjabi, African and Irish listeners.

Working with organisations including local councils, the Council for Ethnic Minority Communities and the Black Policeman's Association means that this project has moved beyond negative images and now creates positive role models for all young people. With over 60 volunteers and eight committee members, weekends and evenings are spent working with others, especially young people, encouraging them to use their spare time in a positive constructive manner.

Inspiration FM's first legal broadcast was from 18 November to 15 December 1996 on a 28-day Restricted Service Licence (RSL) and since then it has been on-air on a total of 15 RSLs. A show for the Greek community was added to the station's line up in 1997, the first and only show of its kind outside London, and the station was included among the limited number of RSL stations who were allowed to broadcast during the Millennium celebrations.

In 2000 Inspiration FM's Mark Dean was approached by BBC Radio Northampton's Editor about presenting a programme to reach all sectors of the community and the show Inspirations was formed. With Marks strong links within the community the Inspirations Show has been going strong covering hard hitting local and international news, and guest stars like Beyoncé.

The Somali community show began in 2003 and a Polish community show was included in 2007 to cater for the large influx of Poles to Northampton after Poland joined the EU in 2004.

In 2004 the organisation was awarded the Queen's golden jubilee award for voluntary service by groups in the community.

On 24 July 2008 Inspiration FM was awarded a 5-year community radio licence by Ofcom and began 24/7 broadcasts when it was officially opened by Northampton Mayor Marianne Taylor on Saturday, 24 July 2010.

DJ Mkhukhwini became a regular guest on BBC Radio 1Xtra after he was spotted presenting the African community show on Inspiration FM since 2011. Jason D Lewis Fri 8-11 pm featured on CapitalXtra in the Guest Mix on Robert Bruce's Homegrown 4-7 pm show on Saturday 16 March 2019

== Programmes ==
Broadcasts from Inspiration FM's studios in Sheep Street Northampton include popular genres like R&B, Reggae, Gospel, Rap, Funk, Dance, Old Skool, Soul music, Asian, African, Greek, Eastern European and Irish Folk music, the local Band Review Show on a Wednesday evening, and a regular Children's show on Saturday mornings.

Programming is aimed at representing areas of the community that are currently under-represented by mainstream radio, this includes the Afro-Caribbean, Irish and Asian although many more are also represented including Children.

The policy of "Inspiration FM" Multi-Cultural in its programming – for the people, by the people.

On Fridays, 6-8 pm The Dance Music show with Mark Manning supported by Gehric Barreau of GT-Systems.

Jason D Lewis Friday 8-11 pm plays new Hip Hop, Rap, UK, RnB, Dancehall and Afrobeats. Jason D Lewis featured on Capital Xtra in the Guest Mix on Robert Bruce's Homegrown 4-7 pm show on Saturday 16 March 2019.

The boys in blue is a radio show that is broadcast from 7-9 am on Saturdays. It features Kieron Lawson as main-host/cohost, Simeon Njela as cohost and Malachi McNally as well. All 3 football fans support rivaling sides (Kieron with Everton, Simeon as Manchester United and Malachi with Liverpool). However, these rival fans do know a lot of football and give a valid opinion to various matters in the footballing world. They cover football on every form, local all the way to the Continental competitions.

== Activities ==
Inspiration FM is a major sponsor of the Northampton Carnival and one of Inspiration FM's founding members Mark Dean sits on the organising committee.

Inspiration FM produces the "Inspirations" Afro-Caribbean Show for BBC Radio Northampton.
