= Antonio Mano Azul =

Portuguese physician

Antonio Mano Azul is a Portuguese physician specialising in stomatology. He was president of the European Association of Oral Medicine in 2000–02. He was professor of microbiology and oral surgery at the Faculty of Medicine of Lisbon.

He was the director of the Revista Portuguesa de Estomatologia e Cirurgia Maxilo-facial (Portuguese Journal of Stomatology and Maxillofacial Surgery).
