= Oral Oncology =

- Discipline: Oncology
- Language: English
- Edited by: Robert Ferris

Publication details
- Former name(s): European Journal of Cancer. Part B, Oral Oncology
- History: 1965-present
- Publisher: Elsevier
- Frequency: Monthly
- Impact factor: 5.337 (2020)

Standard abbreviations
- ISO 4: Oral Oncol.

Indexing
- ISSN: 1368-8375
- OCLC no.: 36724465

Links
- Journal homepage; Online access; Online archive of European Journal of Cancer. Part B, Oral Oncology

Oral Oncology is a monthly peer-reviewed medical journal published by Elsevier covering research about head and neck cancer. It is the official journal of the International Association of Oral Pathologists, the European Association of Oral Medicine, and the International Academy of Oral Oncology.

== Abstracting and indexing ==
The journal is abstracted and indexed in:

- Elsevier BIOBASE
- CINAHL
- Current Contents/Clinical Medicine
- MEDLINE/PubMed
- EMBASE
- Science Citation Index
- Scopus
- Global Health

According to the Journal Citation Reports, the journal has a 2020 impact factor of 5.337.
