= European Association of Oral Medicine =

European dental organization

- European Association of Oral Medicine logo
- Abbreviation: EAOM
- Founder: Miguel Lucas Tomás
- Website: Official website

The European Association of Oral Medicine (EAOM) is a dental organization established in 1998 with mainly European representatives, but some non-European. It was founded by Miguel Lucas Tomás (Spain), Crispian Scully (United Kingdom), Isaac van der Waal (Netherlands), Sir David Mason, Tony Axéll (Scandinavia), Antonio Azul (Portugal), and Stephen Challacombe (United Kingdom).

== List of presidents ==
The presidents of the EAOM have been:

- 1998-2000 - Professor Isaac van der Waal, Netherlands
- 2000-2002 - Professor Antonio Mano Azul, Portugal
- 2002-2004 - Professor Crispian Scully CBE, UK
- 2004-2006 - Professor Antonio Carrassi, Italy
- 2006-2008 - Professor Peter Reichart, Germany
- 2008-2010 - Professor Stephen Challacombe, UK
- 2010-2012 - Professor Jose Bagan, Spain
- 2012-2014 - Professor Stephen Porter, UK
- 2014 - Professor Alexandra Sklavounou, Greece
- 2017 - Professor Marco Carrozzo (10th president)
