= Crispen =

Crispen is a given name. Notable people with the given name include:

- Crispen Chakanyuka (1943–2002), Zimbabwean sculptor
- Crispen Mutakanyi (born 1970), Zimbabwean middle-distance runner

== See also ==
- Crispin and Crispinian
- Crispin (given name)
