= Kayli Mills =

American voice actress (born 1994)

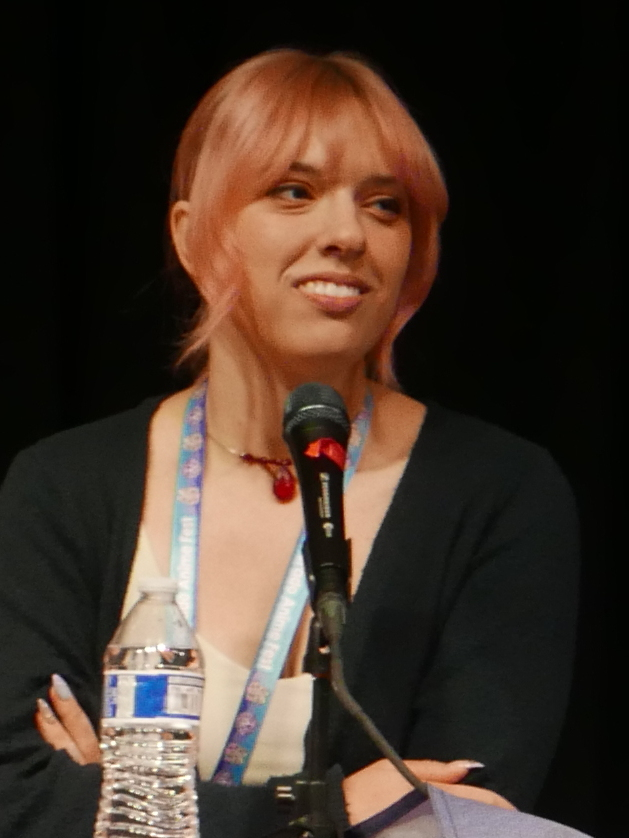
- Mills in 2025
- Born: December 10, 1994 (age 31); Michigan, U.S.
- Other names: MewKiyoko; Kiyo
- Education: Lansing Community College; University of New South Wales
- Occupation: Voice actress
- Years active: 2014–present
- Website: www.kaylimillsva.com

Kayli Mills (born December 10, 1994) is an American voice actress and YouTuber who voices for English versions of anime and Japanese video games. Some of her major roles include Emilia in Re:Zero – Starting Life in Another World, Alice and Rapi in Goddess of Victory: Nikke, Akira Kazama in Street Fighter V, Alice Zuberg in Sword Art Online, Valac Clara in Welcome to Demon School! Iruma-kun, and Jecka in Class of '09.

== Early life ==
Mills grew up in Michigan, moving quite frequently during her childhood, which inhibited her desire to act on stage. In middle school, she began singing and voice acting online. On July 26, 2008, she created a YouTube account under the username "MewKiyoko", where she would upload English-language covers of Japanese anime songs. She studied in Ōtsu, Japan, for 3 months, and worked on a cruise ship during her stay in the country. In 2013, she was part of the online J-pop song cover group IroKokoro Project, appearing in the music video for "Waon" by Yunchi and performing the song's chorus. She then studied abroad in Sydney, Australia.

== Career ==
Since 2016, Mills has been active in the video game voice acting industry. TheGamer noted she "had already established herself when she took on the role of former Turk Cissnei in Final Fantasy 7 Rebirth and the remake of Crisis Core".

Some of her major roles include Emilia in Re:Zero – Starting Life in Another World, Alice and Rapi in Goddess of Victory: Nikke, Akira Kazama in Street Fighter V, Alice Zuberg in Sword Art Online, Valac Clara in Welcome to Demon School! Iruma-kun, Keqing in Genshin Impact and Jecka in Class of '09.

== Personal life ==
Mills uses they/she pronouns and is non-binary. She came out as an abuse victim in a 2025 social media post.

== Filmography ==
=== Animation ===
List of voice performances in animation
Year	Title	Role	Notes	Source
2020	ZooPhobia	Vanexa	Speaking voice Ep. "Bad Luck Jack"; web short	Tweet, Credits in-animation on YouTube
2022	Ejen Ali	Kim	Disney+ Hotstar dub	

=== Films ===
List of voice performances in animation films
Year	Title	Role	Notes	Source
2018	Shopkins: Wild	Rainbow Kate		

=== Anime ===
Year	Title	Role	Notes	Source
2017	Occultic;Nine	Miyū Aikawa		
2017	Fate/Apocrypha	Fiore Forvedge Yggdmillenia		
2017	March Comes In like a Lion	Hinata Kawamoto		
2018	Kakegurui	Runa Yomozuki	Netflix dub	
2018	Granblue Fantasy The Animation	Mary		
2018	Sword Gai	Sayaka		
2018	Re:Zero − Starting Life in Another World	Emilia		
2018	The Seven Deadly Sins	Deldry, Dolores		
2018	The Testament of Sister New Devil BURST	Yuki Nonaka		
2018	Hero Mask	Tina Hearst	Netflix dub	
2019	Hunter × Hunter	Pyon		
2019	The Morose Mononokean II	Keshi		
2019	Record of Grancrest War	Priscilla, Emma, Colleen Messala		
2019	Sword Art Online: Alicization	Alice Zuberg		
2019	Gundam Build Divers	Sarah		
2019	Mob Psycho 100	Minori Asagiri		Resume
2019	KonoSuba	Yunyun		
2019	Cells at Work!	Eosinophil, Campylobacter		
2019	Kemono Friends	Hululu		
2019	Teasing Master Takagi-san	Takagi	Season 2	
2019	Welcome to Demon School! Iruma-kun	Clara Valac, Keebow Valac, Konchie Valac, Ran Ran Valac, Sin Sin Valac, Clara's Mother		
2020	Ascendance of a Bookworm	Freida		
2020	Magia Record: Puella Magi Madoka Magica Side Story	Tsukasa Amane	ADR Script Writer	
2020	In/Spectre	Karin Nanase		
2020	Fly Me to the Moon	Kaname Arisugawa		
2020	Black Rock Shooter	Kagari Izuriha		
2020	Lord El-Melloi II's Case Files: {Rail Zeppelin} Grace Note	Gray		
2020–22	Ghost in the Shell: SAC_2045	Kanami		
2020–present	The Misfit of Demon King Academy	Sasha Necron	2 seasons	
2021	D4DJ First Mix	Esora Shimizu	ADR Script Writer	
2021	Full Dive	Alicia		
2021	The Duke of Death and His Maid	Viola		
2021	Dropout Idol Fruit Tart	Hemo Midori		
2021	King's Raid: Successors of the Will	Cleo		
2021	Love Live! Nijigasaki High School Idol Club	Kasumi Nakasu		
2021	Hortensia Saga	Nonnoria Foly		
2021	Rumble Garanndoll	Yakumo		
2022	LBX Girls	Suzuno		
2022	Odd Taxi	Yuki Mitsuya		
2022	Blue Reflection Ray	Hiori		
2022	Pokémon Master Journeys: The Series	Regina		
2022	Dolls' Frontline	HK416		
2022	Kakegurui Twin	Kokoro Aiura, Runa Yomozuki		
2022	Engage Kiss	Kisara		
2022	PuraOre! Pride of Orange	Riko Saginuma	ADR Script Writer	
2023	KonoSuba: An Explosion on This Wonderful World!	Yunyun		
2023	A Place Further than the Universe	Hinata Miyake		
2023	Digimon Adventure	Potamon, Jagamon, Lunamon		
2023	Jujutsu Kaisen	Yuko Ozawa		
2024	The Grimm Variations	Elf Girl	Episode 4: "The Elves and the Shoemaker"	
2024	Kimi ni Todoke	Ume "Kurumi" Kurumizawa	Season 3	
2024	Mission: Yozakura Family	Ayaka Kirisaki		
2024	Rascal Does Not Dream of Bunny Girl Senpai	Kaede Azusagawa		
2025	Blue Box	Hina Chono		
2025	Secrets of the Silent Witch	Isabelle		
2026	Playing Death Games to Put Food on the Table	Momono		

=== Film ===
Year	Title	Role	Notes	Source
2018	Accel World: Infinite Burst	Risa Tsukiori		Resume
2019	Sound! Euphonium: The Movie – Our Promise: A Brand New Day	Sapphire Kawashima		
2020	Ni no Kuni	Nanako Hayashi		
2021	KonoSuba: God's Blessing on this Wonderful World! Legend of Crimson	Yunyun		
2021	The Island of Giant Insects	Mami Miura		
2024	My Hero Academia: You're Next	Anna Scervino		
2024	Rascal Does Not Dream of a Knapsack Kid	Kaede Azusagawa		

=== Video games ===
Year	Title	Role	Notes	Source
2014–2023	Yandere Simulator	Kuroko Kamenaga, Sakyu Basu		
2016	The Legend of Heroes: Trails of Cold Steel II	Rosine, Mint		Resume
2017	Fire Emblem Heroes	Mareeta, Thea, Tsubasa		Resume
2017	Mary Skelter: Nightmares	Princess Kaguya		Resume
2018	SMITE	Star Salvager Skadi		Resume
2018	The Witch and the Hundred Knight 2	Chelka/Milm		Resume
2018	MapleStory 2	Madria		
2018	Valkyria Chronicles 4	Riley Miller		
2019	God Eater 3	Female Voice #7		Resume
2019	Death end re;Quest	Shina Ninomiya		Resume
2019	Crystar	777 / Nanana		Resume
2019	Pokémon Masters EX	Rosa		
2019	River City Girls	Misako		In-game credits
2019	Daemon X Machina	Abyss, Heaven		
2019	Shantae and the Seven Sirens	Plink		
2019	Code Vein	Female player character voice 7		
2020	One-Punch Man: A Hero Nobody Knows	Additional voices		
2020	Phantasy Star Online 2	Quna		Resume
2020	Deadly Premonition 2: A Blessing in Disguise	Lise Clarkson		
2020	Death end re;Quest 2	Shina Ninomiya		Resume
2020	Genshin Impact	Keqing	Version 5.6 and earlier; replaced by Rosie Day from 5.7 onward	
2021	Re:Zero − Starting Life in Another World: The Prophecy of the Throne	Emilia		In-game credits
2021	Class of '09	Jecka		IMDb
2021	Akiba's Trip: Hellbound & Debriefed	Sister		
2021	MapleStory	Female Kain, Illin, Royce		
2021	Street Fighter V	Akira Kazama		
2021	Shadowverse: Champion's Battle	Shiori Yonazuki		Resume
2021	Lost Judgment	Mami Koda		
2021	Mary Skelter Finale	Princess Kaguya		
2022	Sucker for Love: First Date	Estir		In-game credits
2022	Relayer	Eight		
2022	Fire Emblem Warriors: Three Hopes	Additional voices		
2022	Tower of Fantasy	Mi-a, Pepper		
2022	Soul Hackers 2	Tatara		
2022	Goddess of Victory: Nikke	Rapi, Alice		
2022	Crisis Core: Final Fantasy VII Reunion	Cissnei		
2022	River City Girls 2	Misako		
2023	Arknights	Muelsyse		
2023	Gal Guardians: Demon Purge	Aoi Uno		
2023	Class of '09: The Re-up	Jecka		In-game credits
2023	The Legend of Heroes: Trails into Reverie	Tio Plato, Fran Seeker, Soldiers & Citizens of Zemuria		
2023	Rune Factory 3 Special	Daria		
2023	Detective Pikachu Returns	Additional voices		
2023	Granblue Fantasy Versus: Rising	Sheffy		
2023	Ready or Not	Student		
2024	Persona 3 Reload	Natsuki Moriyama, Additional voices		
2024	Final Fantasy VII Rebirth	Cissnei		
2024	Class of '09: The Flip Side	Jecka		
2024	Card-en-Ciel	Bleuet, Merrow, Aoi Uno, Anita Bellman, Scylla, Aoi Uno		
2024	Strinova	Flavia		
2025	Dynasty Warriors: Origins	Diaochan		
2025	Raidou Remastered: The Mystery of the Soulless Army	Kaya Daijouji		
2026	Code Vein II	Protagonist		
2026	Class of '09: Puzzle Showdown	Jecka		
2026	School Days Remastered	Hikari Kuroda		
2026	Professor Layton and the New World of Steam	Mystella		

=== Web series ===
Year	Title	Role	Notes	Source
2023	Class of '09: Give Me a Fry	Jecka		
2024–present	Class of '09: The Anime	Jecka		
