= Crespin =

Crespin is the name or part of the name of several communes in France:

- Crespin, Aveyron, in the Aveyron department
- Crespin, Nord, in the Nord department
- Crespin, Tarn, in the Tarn department
- Saint-Crespin, in the Seine-Maritime department

For the surname with a list of people bearing this name, see Crespin (surname)
