= Class of '09 (disambiguation) =

Class of '09 may refer to:

- Class of '09 (drama thriller), 2023 American television series.
- Class of '09 (franchise), a series of video games and anime.

== See also ==
- Class of '07
