= Crispian =

Crispian may refer to:

- Saint Crispin (died 285 or 286), martyr
- Crispian Hollis (born 1936), English bishop
- Crispian Mills (born 1973), English singer, songwriter, and guitarist
- Crispian Sallis (born 1959), British art director
- Crispian Scully (1945–2017), British professor of oral medicine
- Crispian St. Peters (born 1939 as Robin Peter Smith), English pop singer in the 1960s
- Crispian Steele-Perkins (born 1944), English virtuoso classical trumpeter

== See also ==
- Crispin (disambiguation)
