= Crispin (given name) =

- Gender: Masculine

Origin
- Origin: Latin: Crispus
- Meaning: curly-headed

Crispin is a masculine given name.

== People ==
- Crispin Agnew (born 1944), Scottish advocate, herald and former explorer
- Crispin Beltran (1933–2008), Filipino politician and labor leader
- Crispin Blunt (born 1960), a Member of Parliament
- Crispin Bonham-Carter (born 1969), English actor
- Crispin John Cansino (born 1999), Filipino basketball player
- Crispin Castro Monroy (born 1936), Mexican politician
- Crispin Conroy (born 1963), Australian diplomat
- Crispin Duenas (born 1986), Canadian Olympic recurve archer
- Crispin Freeman (born 1972), American voice actor
- Crispin Gardiner (born 1942), New Zealand physicist
- Crispin Glover (born 1964), American film actor
- Crispin S. Gregoire (born in 1956), Permanent Representative to the United Nations for the Commonwealth of Dominica
- Crispin Grey-Johnson (born 1946), Gambian politician
- Crispin Gray, guitarist and songwriter for musical groups Queen Adreena and The Dogbones
- Crispin Hunt, English lead singer of the Britpop group Longpigs
- Crispin Nash-Williams (1932–2001), British mathematician
- Crispian St. Peters (1939–2010) English singer and songwriter
- Crispin Salvador (1937–2002), Filipino writer and intellectual known for his novels, essays and short-fiction
- Crispin Sartwell (born 1958), American philosophy professor, anarchist and journalist
- Crispin Shumina, member of the Pan-African Parliament from Zambia
- Crispin Tickell (born 1930), English diplomat, environmentalist and academic
- Crispin van den Broeck (1523–1591), Flemish painter
- Crispin Wright (born 1942), English philosopher

== Fictional characters ==
- Crispin, from Noli Me Tangere by Jose Rizal
- Crispin, from Class of '09
