= Jose Bagan =

Spanish academic

Jose Vicente Bagan was president of the European Association of Oral Medicine for 2010–12. He is professor of oral medicine and the chairman of the stomatology service at the University of Valencia. He is the author of 10 books.

== Selected publications ==
- Oral Medicine and Pathology at a Glance
- Oral and Maxillofacial Diseases
