= Challacombe scale =

Medical scale measuring mouth dryness

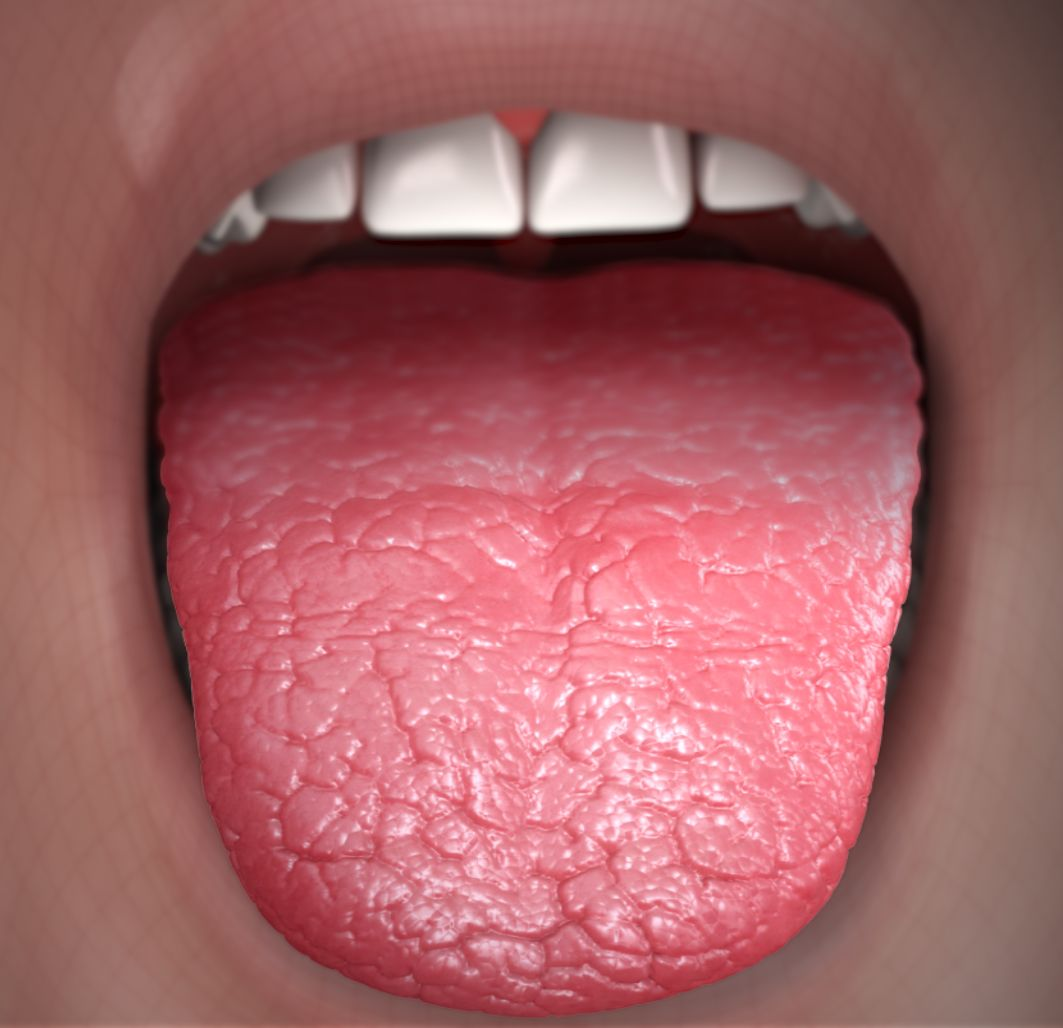
- Dry mouth
- Purpose: To identify and quantify dryness of the mouth

The Challacombe scale is a widely used diagnostic medical tool designed to produce a clinical oral dryness score (CODS) which quantifies the extent of dryness of the mouth, with the aim of making a decision of whether to treat or not, and to monitor its progression or regression.

The scale can be used to assess salivary flow and therefore calculate a risk of dental caries. In addition, it has a particular use in the assessment of dry mouth in Sjögren syndrome.

Based on a 10-point scale of clinical physical findings, a score of one is least severe and 10 most severe.

== Medical use ==
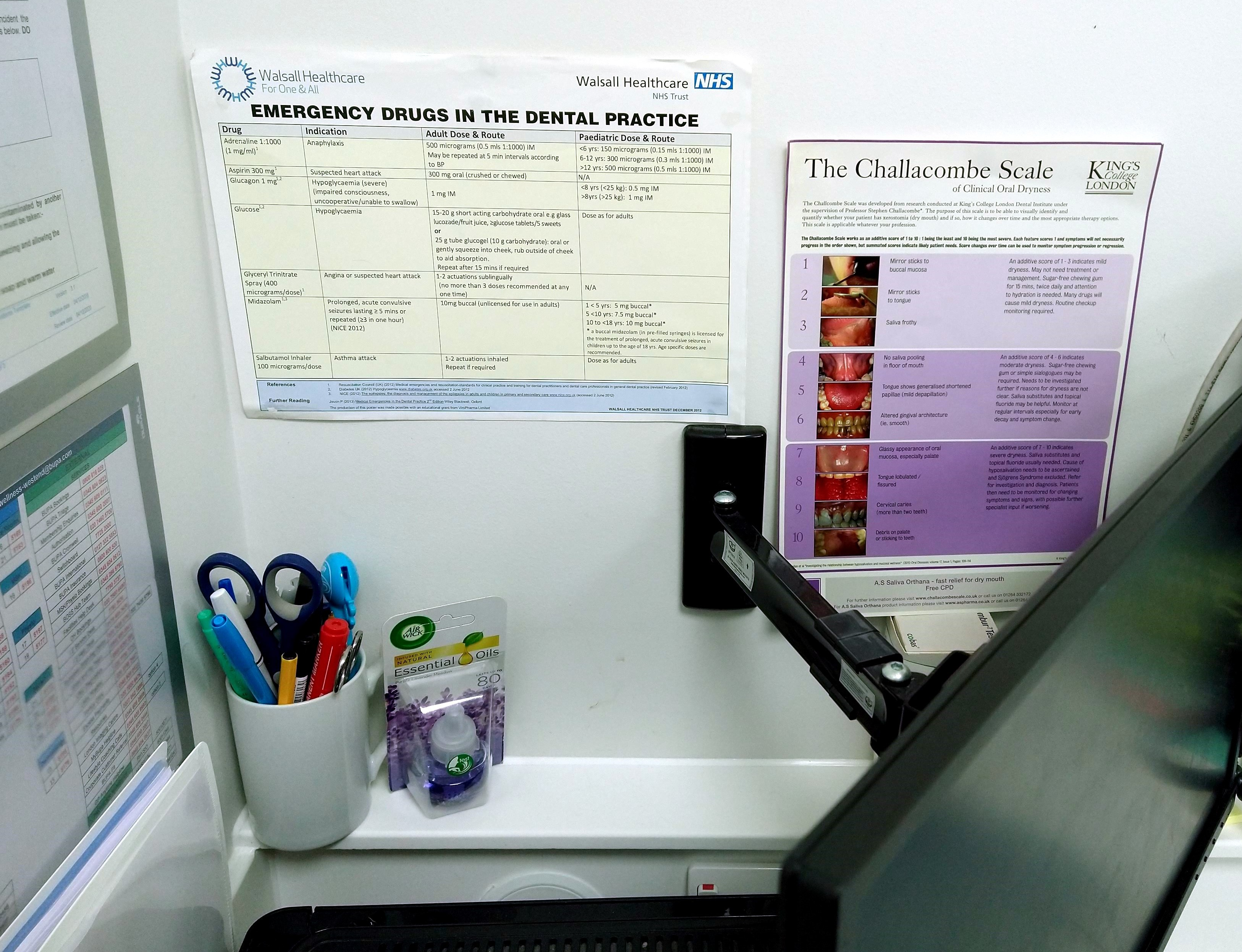
Challacombe scale inside a dental hygienist's surgery

Dry mouth (xerostomia) is frequently caused by medication and to a lesser extent, by anxiety or Sjögren's syndrome. It can be useful to have the extent of dryness recorded. That is, if a person has a complaint of a dry mouth, the clinician can apply the Challacombe scale to determine its severity and whether treatment is required. The scale also provides a common reference point, allowing progress or deterioration to be monitored.

The Challacombe score can be used to assess dry mouth in Sjögren syndrome and to assess salivary flow and therefore calculate a risk of dental caries, which are more likely in drier mouths.

The score correlates with the rate of salivary flow and with the wetness of the mouth, indicated by the thickness of the mucosal film on the inside of the cheeks, on the palate and on the tongue.

While a high score indicates the need for treatment and investigation, a low score may indicate the need not to intervene, a decision frequently more difficult to make.

== Procedure and interpretation of results ==
The following factors are used to evaluate the dryness of the mouth. The presence of each accrues one point and further referral and assessment is required for scores of 7 or more. As the mouth becomes drier, each feature is often seen in sequence with the score progressively increasing. Scores may change, for better or worse, allowing monitoring. Example images accompany the features.

1. Dental mirror sticks to buccal mucosa
2. Mirror sticks to tongue
3. Saliva frothy
4. No saliva pooling in floor of mouth
5. Tongue shows generalised shortened papillae (mild depapillation)
6. Altered gingival architecture (i.e. smooth)
7. Glassy appearance of oral mucosa, especially palate
8. Tongue lobulated/fissured
9. Cervical caries (more than two teeth)
10. Debris on palate or sticking to teeth

Score	Severity and management
1–3	A score totalling 1–3 is indicative of mild dryness and may not require further management. A medication history may reveal the cause, and treatment is with twice daily chewing of sugar-free chewing gum and keeping hydrated. Follow-up is by regular monitoring.
4–6	A score totalling 4–6 is indicative of moderate dryness and requires sugar-free chewing gum or simple sialogogues. Further investigation is needed if the cause is unclear, and saliva substitutes and topical fluoride may be helpful. Regular follow-ups to check for early dental decay and symptom change are required.
7–10	A score totalling 7–10 is indicative of severe dryness and needs saliva substitutes and topical fluoride. The reasons for reduced salivation needs assessment and Sjögren syndrome needs to be excluded. A referral is required for further investigation and diagnosis, particularly if symptoms and signs worsen.

== History ==
The Challacombe scale was launched on 2 September 2011 and based on research conducted at King's College London Dental Institute under the supervision of professor Stephen Challacombe.

== See also ==
- Dehydration
