= Fox Barrel =

California hard apple cider company

- Company type: Subsidiary
- Industry: Alcoholic beverage
- Founded: 2004
- Founder: Bruce Nissen & Sean Deorsey
- Defunct: 2014
- Successor: Crispin Hard Cider Company
- Headquarters: Colfax, California, US
- Products: Perry
- Owner: Crispin Cider Company
- Parent: MillerCoors
- Website: foxbarrel.com

Fox Barrel is a brand of perry (marketed as "pear cider") made in Colfax, California, United States.

== History ==
The Fox Barrel company was co-founded in 2004 by Bruce Nissen and Sean Deorsey. It was purchased by Minneapolis, MN based Crispin Cider Company in early 2010.

Fox Barrel perry and Crispin cider are both now made in a cidery in Colfax, CA located at 1213 South Auburn Street, directly off of Interstate 80, between Sacramento and Tahoe.

Crispin and Fox Barrel were purchased by MillerCoors in 2012. Fox Barrel products were folded into the Crispin Label in 2014.

== Awards ==
2007

- Gold Medal Winner at San Diego County Fair (Pear)
- First Place Winner at West Coast Brewers Craft Convention (Pear)
- Gold Medal California State Fair (Pear)
- Bronze Medal Winner at G.L.O.W.S (Pear)
- Silver Medal Winner at G.L.O.W.S (Black Currant)
