= The Witch and the Hundred Knight =

2013 video game

- Developer: Nippon Ichi Software
- Publishers: JP: Nippon Ichi Software; WW: NIS America
- Artist: Takehito Harada (character designer)
- Composer: Tenpei Sato
- Engine: PhyreEngine
- Platforms: PlayStation 3, PlayStation 4
- Release: PlayStation 3: JP: July 25, 2013; EU: March 21, 2014; NA: March 25, 2014; AU: March 27, 2014; PlayStation 4: JP: September 25, 2015; NA: March 1, 2016; AU: March 3, 2016; EU: March 4, 2016
- Genre: Action role-playing game
- Mode: Single-player

The Witch and the Hundred Knight (魔女と百騎兵, Majo to Hyakkihei) is a 2013 action role-playing video game developed and published by Nippon Ichi Software for the PlayStation 3. An enhanced port for the PlayStation 4, The Witch and the Hundred Knight: Revival Edition, was released in 2015.

The game's story revolves around Metallia, a powerful swamp witch who summons the legendary Hundred Knight in order to defeat her rival, the Forest Witch Malia, and cover the world in swamp mud.

The Witch and the Hundred Knight received mixed reception from critics, who praised the unconventional story but faulted the game for various gameplay and technical issues, including a game-breaking bug. The game was followed by a sequel released in 2017.

== Gameplay ==
The Witch and the Hundred Knight is an action RPG played from a top-down isometric view. The player character, the Hundred Knight, can equip up to 5 weapons and cycle through them to create combos. The player can also equip different "facets" that not only change their appearance but alter their stats and weapon proficiencies. As the game progresses, the player will gain access to special abilities and powers that can help them in battle and increase the bonus gauge, which leads to better rewards after clearing a stage.

The game world is linear, with new stages being unlocked one after another. However, the player can go back and revisit previous stages to find new areas and items. The player's main base of operations is Metallia's house in Niblhenne Swamp, where they can save their game and access a basic merchant. If the player activates a Pillar in the field, they can warp directly back to base and start at that Pillar when they re-enter the level.

If the player is KO'ed while exploring, they will return to Metallia's house and forfeit any items they acquired during their adventure. The player may raid NPC villages to gain items, although this increases the player's "karma," possibly causing NPCs to attack the player on sight if it is too high. By picking up Anima from defeated enemies, the player can use Metallia's Bucket List to do such things as lower Karma and unlock new abilities.

While exploring the world, fighting enemies, and using special abilities, the player consumes Giga Calories, or Gcals for short. When the player runs out of Gcals, their HP begins to quickly and continuously deplete until they are KO'ed. The player can restore Gcals by consuming food items or devouring weakened enemies in a short [quick time event]. This creates "garbage" in the Hundred Knight's stomach that takes up space and must be expelled through the use of special items.

The Revival PS4 port version improves on graphics and makes a new Metallia-playable mode available.

== Plot ==
The game takes place in the dark fantasy world of Medea, where there exists a highly poisonous swamp, Niblhenne, bounded by a large forest. Metallia, the self-proclaimed "Swamp Witch," lives in the swamp along with her robotic servant, Arlecchino. Despite not being an officially recognized witch, Metallia is incredibly powerful and immortal, though her one weakness is that she cannot leave the swamp at all. She has been at war with Forest Witch Malia for 100 years, until she finally summons the Hundred Knight to turn the tide in her favor. The Hundred Knight turns out to be far smaller and weaker than she envisioned, but it does have the ability to release "Pillars" that have sealed in the swamp. She sends the Hundred Knight out on a mission to release all Pillars and spread the swamp across the world to extend her power and reach.

The Hundred Knight defeats Malia and Metallia curses her into a mouse despite learning that she was her "mother". Afterwards, she encounters Visco, a princess who has been cursed to look like a dog and desires Malia's help. Metallia tricks Visco into joining her, but is unable to cure Visco's curse. She also meets Lucchini, a beastman astrologer who desires to become her apprentice, and Mani, a smart-mouthed "punk" swamp fairy who is the Hundred Knight's backup guide. She continues spreading the swamp until she is invited to the witches' "Nighttime Soiree", which would make her a real witch. The excited Metallia does all the required preparations only to learn that they were a prank by the witches to make her look like a fool. The depressed Metallia shuts herself in while Visco and the Hundred Knight infiltrate Brockenturm, the witches' gathering place, to unlock the Pillars there and allow Metallia to come. She arrives and exacts her revenge by destroying Brockenturm and defeating several of the witches, forcing them to recognize her as a real witch.

Afterwards, Metallia is invited to become the court witch of the kingdom of Amataya, but it turns out to be a plan orchestrated by the Church of Niike and Belda the Scum Witch to destroy the other witches, accusing them, and Metallia, of being evil. Metallia is captured but the Hundred Knight saves her from being executed and defeats Belda. The seemingly happy ending is ruined when Lucchini betrays Metallia, and helps his evil father Totopepe kill everyone in Amataya's castle, including Visco. He reveals that he is a powerful astrologist who viewed the end of the world countless times, and hates Metallia as even she could not change the destruction fated to befall the world, despite him believing in her as the only hope.

Metallia escapes to another universe, and causes it to become unstable, destroying it and using its power to revive everyone in the real world. Totopepe is killed, and Metallia allows Lucchini to flee. Visco, however, remains dead. The Hundred Knight breaks the final swamp's seal under Amataya and they journey to the bottom, where they find Great Witch Uruka. Metallia is shocked that Uruka is her mentor, the Old Hag. Uruka tells Metallia that she was actually artificially created from a seed in order to drain the swamp, which are the remnants of the perished ancient god Niike who was killed by the witches. The more Metallia uses her magic, the more the poisonous swamp drains, ultimately destroying all magic but saving the world from the Green Spots plague and the further threat of Niike returning. Malia was a co-conspirator, provoking her to use her magic power. She also claims the Hundred Knight was a part of Niike, but his power was sapped due to Metallia taking away his true name as part of the contract.

Suddenly, Mani appears, also betraying Metallia and revealing that she was Niike's former confidant and lover, the witch Aguni. Mani kills Uruka and goes to join the reviving Niike. Metallia breaks her contract with the Hundred Knight and agrees to become the new seal for Niike to keep him contained, but the Hundred Knight convinces her to fight and destroy Niike instead. The Hundred Knight kills Niike (in the form of a "mega" version of himself), and then finally Aguni, who morphs into a twisted monster in her rage at seeing Niike killed. After this, Metallia finds Visco's soul, and despite Visco's wishes, sacrifices herself to revive Visco. The Hundred Knight, however, presents a seed that he uses to eventually revive Metallia again.

== Development ==
Development on The Witch and the Hundred Knight began around April 2010, while it was expected to be complete in one or one-and-a-half years, the game was delayed over time because of many issues. NIS claimed they did not want the graphics or visuals of the game to look inferior to other titles. There was talk, early in development, about making it an open world game, but instead NIS chose to focus on the 3D graphics technology. The development team has been working on the action part of the game and reducing load times, and the open world were scrapped.

== Release ==
The Witch and the Hundred Knight was originally scheduled for release in Japan on June 28, 2012, but was later pushed back to an indefinite 2013 release date, and was eventually released on July 25, 2013. The game was released in Europe on March 21, 2014, in North America on March 25, 2014, and in Australia on March 27, 2014. There is both a regular and limited-edition version of the game. The limited edition comes with a 44-page hardcover visual book, a Metallia Nendoroid Petit figurine, and the game's soundtrack on two discs.

== Reception ==
Reception

Aggregate score
Aggregator	Score	
Aggregator	PS3	PS4
Metacritic	53/100	63/100

Review scores
Publication	Score	
Publication	PS3	PS4
Destructoid	6/10	N/A
Electronic Gaming Monthly	7/10	N/A
Famitsu	31/40	N/A
GameRevolution	5/10	N/A
GameSpot	6/10	N/A
GamesRadar+	3/5	N/A
Hardcore Gamer	3/5	3.5/5
IGN	5.8/10	N/A
PlayStation Official Magazine – UK	5/10	N/A
Push Square	5/10	6/10
RPGamer	1.5/5	N/A
USgamer	4/5	N/A
The Escapist	2.5/5	N/A
Slant Magazine	1.5/5	N/A

The game received "mixed" reviews on both platforms according to the review aggregation website Metacritic. In Japan, Famitsu gave it a score of three eights and one seven for the PlayStation 3 original.

Cubed3 praised the "awesomely dark" main character Metallia, but noted there were some gripes in the gameplay, including repetitive exploration and unreliable camera angles. A major bug that spontaneously occurs at seemingly any time, forcing the game to return to the PS3 system menu - losing all unsaved progress in the process - is also a factor in the game not being received more favourably. The Revival Edition on PlayStation 4 fared better, with Cubed3 praising the changes that improved the game and made it more accessible, whilst seemingly removing or reducing the rate of the crash bug.

411Mania gave the original game a score of seven out of ten, calling it "a fun time killer in small doses. With an interesting story and plenty of fun hack-and-slash looting to be had, you would not be amiss picking up this tile if you don't mind dealing with a few technical and visual issues." The Digital Fix, however, gave it five out of ten, saying, "There's a good amount of content (around thirty to forty hours at least) to The Witch and the Hundred Knight – it's just a shame that it never really comes together." The Escapist gave it a similar score of two-and-a-half stars out of five, saying, "If any one element of The Witch and The Hundred Knight had been truly great, you could look over some of its warts, but without any strong focus it's just a bog standard action RPG that's artificially attempted to be made interesting with tons of superfluous gameplay mechanics tacked on."

Common Sense Media gave it two stars out of five, saying, "The gameplay is accessible, lighthearted, and expansive, but it really doesn't break any new ground for the genre. Plus, combat gets repetitive after a while, and the dialogue sequences border on silly and offensive. The developer didn't try to make the story understandable to those unfamiliar with its brand of humor, which could alienate some players from even trying the game. And, although there are many areas to explore, there isn't any replayability after you finish the single-player adventure." Slant Magazine gave it one-and-a-half stars out of five, calling it "entertainment of the tawdriest variety, and while a game has no obligation to be significant, it'd be nice if it wasn't so mindless." Metro gave it a similar score of three out of ten, saying, "It's great to see the creators of Disgaea trying something new but this charmless, needlessly confusing, action role-player is a failure on almost every level."

== See also ==
- The Witch and the Hundred Knight 2 - a sequel released in 2017 featuring a different witch
