= Northampton Carnival =

Annual event in Northampton, England

Coordinates: 52.2257°N 0.8957°W

Northampton Carnival Arts Consortium.

The Northampton Carnival has had strong traditions in the town from the 1960s through the Midsummer Meadow times in the 1980s, to its short break in the late 1990s, until its revival in 2005.

The current carnival spans two days from a Friday to Saturday in June and includes concerts, events, community stalls and a fair ground in Delapre Park, a carnival procession through the town centre, including the Abington Street pedestrianised area, which take place on the Saturday, and a series of events featuring performers, dancers and workshops from community groups from Northampton and other towns that take place in the Market Square on the final day, Sunday.

== History ==
The earliest example of the Northampton Carnival's roots is a float photographed in 1914 which can be seen going past the Guildhall.

In the 1970s and early 1980s the carnival parade took place during the week and started in the evening after tea time but was afterwards switched to Sunday afternoons.

Midsummer Meadow and Abington Park were approved by the Borough Council as assembly points for the 1996 carnival scheduled for 23 June, with the Midsummer Meadow car park to be newly resurfaced.

The carnival took a break in the late 1990s and early 2000s with the St Crispin Street Fair which ran from 1993 to 2004 filling the streets of the town centre for two days in October. In 1997 the Northamptonshire 'Roots and Culture Fest' multicultural festival was established and was held in the summer until 2004 after which it merged with the revived carnival.

The theme of the carnival when it returned in 2005 was "Celebrate Masquerade" and in 2006 the parade took place on Saturday, 17 June with a theme of "Colours of the Rainbow".

The 2007 carnival took place over the three days of 8, 9 and 10 June, with a theme of "Earth, Wind, Fire and Water".

In 2008 Ashil Patel of Patel Samaj was chosen as Culture Prince, Hanisha Patel of the Gujarati Supplementary School was Culture Princess, Priya Patel of the Gujarati Community (IHWO) was Runner Up and Sushma Patel of Patel Samaj was Culture Queen. Best Carnival Parade Troupe was Mahogany meets Northampton. Best Carnival Float was Delapre Primary School & Friends and Royal & Derngate. Best Live Music was Samba Bandits. Best Visiting Troupe was St.Kitts & Nevis and Friends. The carnival theme was "Masque - Exploring Dual Identities" and the events took place from Friday-Sunday, 13-15 June.

The 2009 carnival took place on Saturday, 13 June 2009, with the main procession setting off from Delapre park at 2pm, winding through the town centre and returning at 4.30pm. The theme was "Sole of the people". The prize winners were:

- Best Live Music:
- Runner up – NCAC Steel Pan Explorers,
- Winner – The Richardson’s Brass Band,
- Best Float Design:
- Runner Up – Razzle Dazzles,
- Winner – Vernon Terrace Primary School,
- Best Visiting Float:
- Runner Up – St Kitts & Nevis & Friends (Luton),
- Winner – Utopia Mas (Bedford),
- Best Visiting Troupe:
- Runner Up – W.A.C.A (Wellingborough Afro Caribbean Association),
- Winner – Mahogany Meets Northampton.

The 2013 Northampton Carnival took place on Saturday, 8 June.

== See also ==
- Description of 1936 Carnival, Accessed 2014_01_22
