= Miguel Lucas Tomás =

Spanish physician (1937–2023)

Miguel Lucas Tomás (13 September 1937 – 6 February 2023) was a Spanish physician who was professor of medical stomatology at Complutense University of Madrid. He was the founder of European Association of Oral Medicine. Tomás died on 6 February 2023, at the age of 85.
