= Elias Crespin =

Venezuelan artist

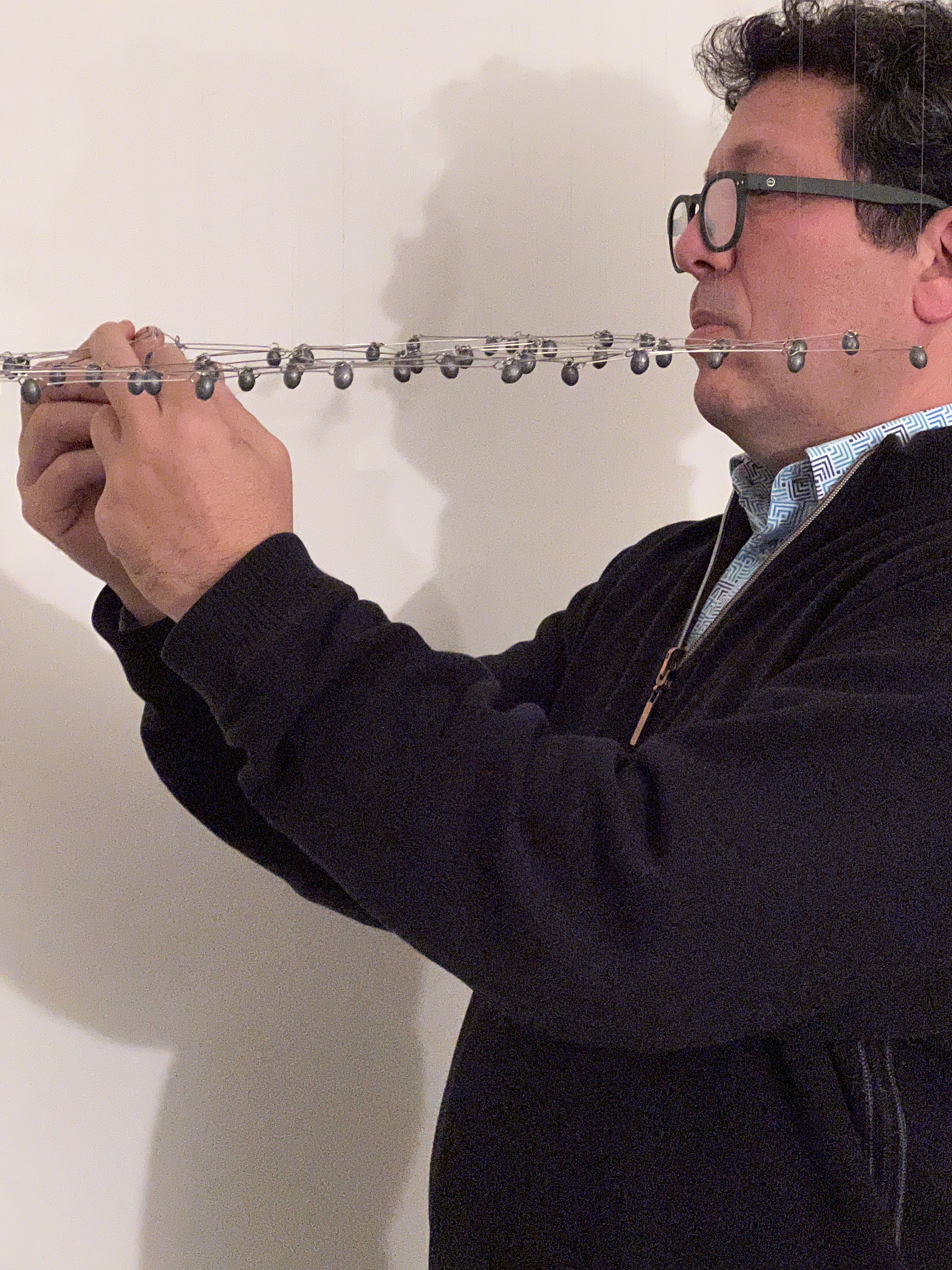
- Elias Crespin with one of his works
- Born: 1965 (age 59–60); Caracas, Venezuela
- Notable work: L'Onde du Midi, 2020, Louvre
- Style: Sculpture, kinetic art, robotic art

Elias Crespin (born 1965) is a Venezuelan kinetic artist. Crespin is known for his moving, motorized sculptures, made of series of suspended geometric elements that slowly evolve and unfold in the air. He lives in Paris.

== Career ==
=== L'Onde du Midi ===
In 2019 he was commissioned by Jean-Luc Martinez, director of the Louvre Museum, Paris, to create a sculpture. This followed commissions to Georges Braque, Anselm Kiefer, Cy Twombly, and François Morellet. In January 2020, L'Onde du Midi was inaugurated, hovering over 19th century stairs on the North side of the Louvre Colonnade. The work is a succession of 128 aluminium tubes, painted blue, that undulates from order to chaos following an algorithmic choreography.

== Early life ==
He was born in Caracas, Venezuela.

He started his career as an engineer and informatician. In 2000, he began experimenting with algorithms and motors to create "electrokinetic" sculptures. These led to his first piece, Malla electrocinética, in 2002.

In 2008, he moved to Paris.

== Bibliography ==
His works feature in permanent collections such as the Louvre, the Maison de l’Amérique Latine in Paris, the Museum of Fine Arts, Houston, El Museo del Barrio in New York, the MALBA in Buenos Aires, or the Ullens Center for Contemporary Art, Beijing

Some of his works are permanently exhibited:

Louvre Museum Paris, France; Onde du Midi, 2020

House of Latin America, Paris, France, Transparente 60, 2016

The Nelson-Atkins Museum, Kansas City, Missouri. Grand HexaNet, 2018

Museum of Fine Arts, Houston, Texas.; Equiláteros, 2008

Museum of Fine Arts, Buenos Aires, Argentina; Trianguconcéntricos, 2009

MALBA The Latin American Art Museum of Buenos Aires, Malla Electrocinética II, 2009

Exhibition catalogues

- Negative Space. Trajectories of Sculpture in the 20th and 21st Centuries, under the direction of Peter Weiermair, ZKM Center for Arts and Media, Karlsruhe, Germany, 2021 ISBN 9780262044868, 0262044862
- Artistes & Robots, under the direction of Laurence Bertrand Dorléac and Jérôme Neutres, Réunion des musées nationaux - Grand Palais, Paris, France, 2018 ISBN 9782711871094, 2711871096
- The Urge to create Visions...1929-2017, Center of Polish Sculpture, Radom, Poland, 2017
- De Nature en Sculpture, Fondation Villa Datris, L’Isle-sur-la-Sorgue, France, 2017
- Slow Motion, Maison de l’Amérique Latine / Editions Hermann, Paris, France, 2017
- Geometrische Choreographien, Das Kleine Museum : Weissenstadt, Germany, 2015
- Elias Crespin, Galerie Denise René, Paris, France, 2014
- Elias Crespin. Temps suspendu, Galerie de la Marine, Nice, France, 2014
- Elias Crespin. Parallels, Cecilia de Torres, Ltd., New York, NY, USA, 2012
- Elias Crespin. Hiperficies, Ars Longa, Paris, France, 2010
- Dynamo. Un siècle de mouvement et lumière dans l'art. 1913-2013, under the direction of Serge Lemoine, RMN, Paris, France, 2013 ISBN 9782711860500, 2711860507
- Turbulences II, Fondation Boghossian / Espace culturel Louis-Vuitton, Brussels, Belgium, 2013
- Turbulences, Espace Culturel Louis Vuitton, Paris, France, 2012
