= Stephen Porter (professor) =

English professor

- Occupation: Professor of Oral Medicine

Academic work
- Institutions: University College London; University College London Hospital Royal Free Hospital

Stephen Porter is Director of UCL Eastman Dental Institute where he has been Professor of Oral Medicine since 1997. He is a consultant in Oral Medicine at University College Hospital, London and a member of the Faculty of Dental Surgery of the Royal College of Surgeons. Porter has published more than 450 scholarly works, including the scientific journals The BMJ, The British Dental Journal and The Journal of the American Dental Association.

== Early life and education ==
Porter was born in Lanarkshire, Scotland. He was educated at The High School of Glasgow and Langside College, Glasgow before graduating from the University of Glasgow with a Bachelor of Science (Biochemistry) and Bachelor of Dental Surgery. Porter went on to graduate from the University of Bristol with a Doctor of Philosophy (PhD), Bachelor of Medicine/Bachelor of Surgery and a Doctor of Medicine.

He was awarded a Fellowship of The Royal College of Surgeons (FRCS) and The Royal College of Surgeons of Edinburgh in 1987.

== Research and career ==
Porter is Professor of Oral Medicine and Head of the Division of Maxillofacial Medical Diagnostic & Surgical Sciences at UCL Eastman Dental Institute. He was appointed as Director of the UCL Eastman Dental Institute in 2008.

Porter's research has focused on identifying diagnosing and preventing pre-cancer and cancer of the mouth and establishing treatments that lessen the adverse effects of cancer therapy. His research has reported several firsts including: reporting the impact of AIDS and HIV disease on the mouth, discovering the immunogenetic basis of aggressive periodontitis, reporting the viral cause of Kaposi's sarcoma (HHIV-8) in the mouth of some immune deficient patients and describing the oral disease and the impact on oral health of scleroderma.

He has worked with a host of patient groups to improve oral health and access to dental treatment for children and adults with complex medical problems, including SRUK, Lupus UK and Ehlers-Danlos Support UK.

== Awards ==
- Honorary Doctorate of Medicine, University of Gothenburg, 2011
- Menzies Campbell Medal, Royal College of Surgeons of England, 2015
- Edward Leo Sheridan Medal, Royal College of Surgeons of Ireland, 2020
