= Crispin Hard Cider Company =

Minnesota hard apple cider company

Crispin Cider Company
- Company type: Subsidiary
- Industry: Alcoholic beverage
- Founded: 2004
- Founder: Joe and Lesley Heron
- Headquarters: Minneapolis, United States
- Products: Hard ciders
- Production output: 6 million bottles (2010)
- Revenue: $5 million (2010)
- Owner: Molson Coors
- Parent: Molson Coors Beverage Company
- Divisions: Fox Barrel Cider
- Website: www.crispincider.com

Crispin Cider is a hard apple cider company based and produced in Minneapolis, Minnesota by Minneapolis Cider Company.

Crispin was formerly located in Minneapolis. The company acquired Fox Barrel Cider in 2010. The purchase included its cidery in Colfax where the company is now headquartered. In early 2011, Crispin began importing a dry English cider, Browns Lane (named after the original Jaguar factory in Coventry), from England. In 2012, Crispin was acquired by MillerCoors a subsidiary of Molson Coors. The founders of Crispin went on to open Copper & Kings American Brandy in 2014. In 2023 Crispin re-launched with the Minneapolis Cider Company with new varieties and the original Crispin recipe.
