= British Society for Oral and Dental Research =

British Society for Oral and Dental Research logo

The British Society for Oral and Dental Research is a UK-based professional society established in 1953. The society aims to:

- Support and represent the oral health research community in the UK.
- Encourage junior workers to become involved in oral and dental research.
- Facilitate the dissemination and application of research findings relating to oral health and the interactions between oral and systemic health.
