= Revista Portuguesa de Estomatologia e Cirurgia Maxilo-facial =

Medical journal

Revista Portuguesa de Estomatologia e Cirurgia Maxilo-facial (English: Portuguese Journal of Stomatology and Maxillofacial Surgery) is a discontinued journal of stomatology and maxillofacial surgery. The last issue was volume 57, number 4 for October-December 2016. It was indexed in Scopus.
