= Augusto Crespin =

Salvadoran painter

- Born: July 24, 1956 (age 68); Mejicanos, El Salvador
- Known for: Artist
- Spouse: Edmidlia Guzman
- Website: instagram.com/acrespines/

Augusto Crespin is a Salvadorans artist known for his ink drawings, paintings, and engravings, and illustrations.

== Early life and education ==
Crespinwas born in El Salvador in July 1956. He studied ink drawing and painting in the Academy of Valero Lecha from 1969 to 1973, engraving with the Japanese master Futaba Ando in the Centro de Artes de El Salvador in 1975, and further studies in engraving with the Japanese masters Hodaka Yoshida and Futaba Ando in the University of Costa Rica in 1981.

== Career ==
Crespin has participated in over 100 collective exhibitions in Asia, Europe and America, including Germany, Canada, Costa Rica and Japan. He has also had 32 individual exhibitions ranging from Canada, Germany, Denmark and Costa Rica to El Salvador.

Crespin held office as national director of arts at the Ministry of Culture of El Salvador during 2015. Since then he has stayed at the Ministry of Culture, acting as Director of National Collection of Visual Arts from 2016 to 2018 and is currently director of the San Jacinto Exhibition Hall.

Using his experience growing up during the Salvadoran Civil War, Crespin frequently conveys social criticism in his ink drawings and paintings. This translates into depictions of violence and deformities in times of war, and of poetic beauty during peace times.

Crespin had previously explained the concept to which he adheres in search for inspiration through a monologue he gave during an interview in War Zones:

"...I know these streets, I know this city [San Salvador], I have seen it change... I have seen it fall down from bombs, no? So in this way I have seen... The demonstration when Monsignor Romero died, it was an enormous multitude in the streets of San Salvador. And to see this multitude and to hear the gunshots and see all those scenes, it touches you, it hits you, no? You realize that the painting you did, which I did, in earlier years, didn't respond to the moment being lived. So to see all this pain, all this desperation, I realized that in my painting I had to vary, to change, because I consider that painters have to be present with their epoch. If not, what will the future say, when they look and see the work, the results of an author, if he didn't paint his period?"
