= Marie-José Crespin =

Senegalese magistrate (1936–2025)

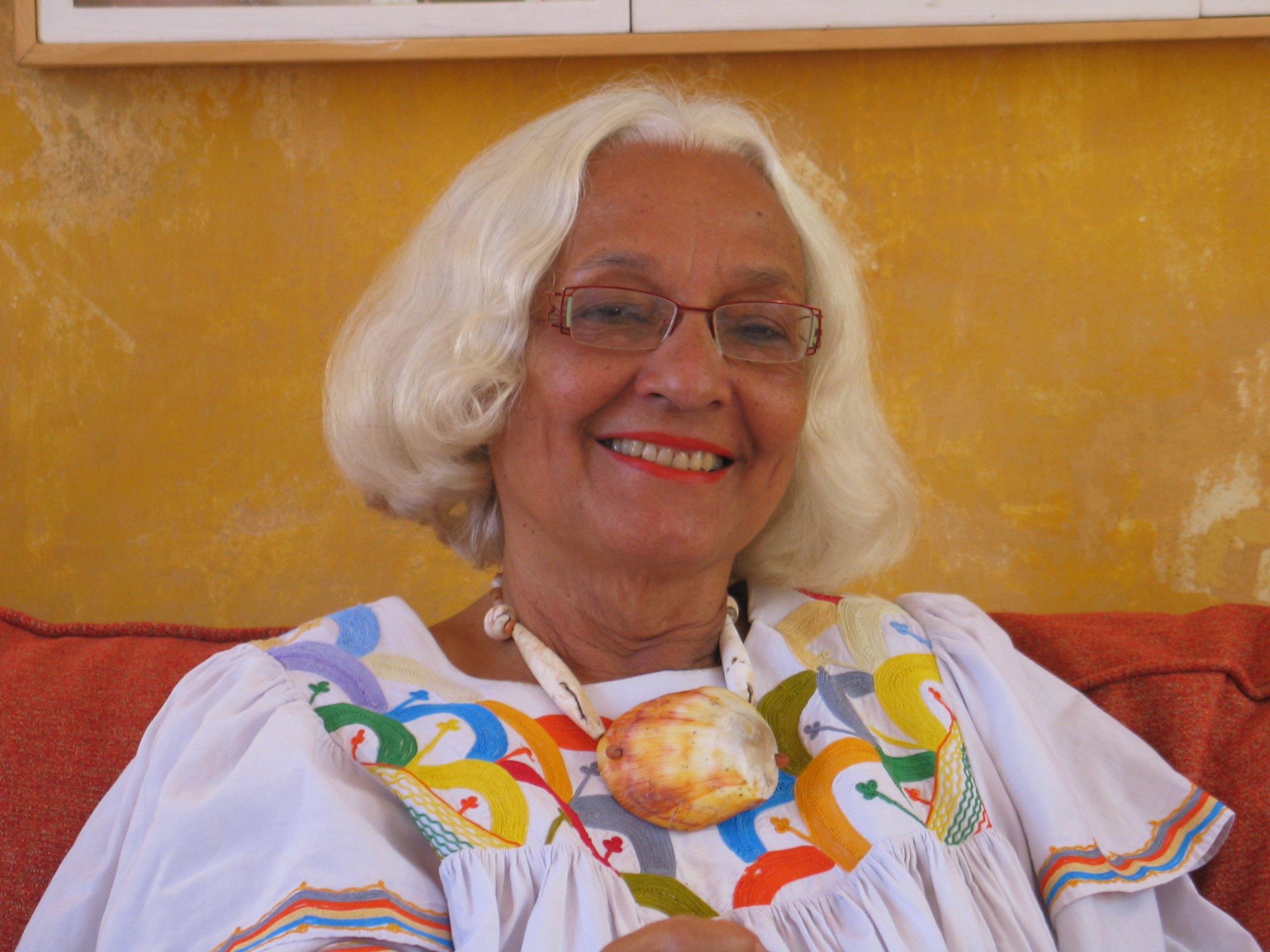
- Crespin in 2009
- Born: 27 July 1936; French Dahomey, French West Africa
- Died: 6 February 2025 (aged 88)
- Other names: Magistrate

Marie-José Crespin (27 July 1936 – 6 February 2025) was a Senegalese magistrate.

After her retirement from the bench, Crespin worked as a jewelry designer and hosted an exhibition dedicated to the island of Gorée.

== Life and career ==
Born in Dahomey on 27 July 1936, her father and grandfather were lawyers. In 1940, her family moved to Dakar. In 1961, upon Senegal's independence, she was one of the first four magistrates of the country alongside Ousmane Camara, El Hadji Diouf, and André Gilbert.

Crespin worked in the Senegalese court system for 41 years. She served as a member of the Court of Cassation and Constitutional Council from 1992 until retiring in 2001. She was also an examining magistrate and was the first woman to preside over the assizes in criminal cases in Senegal.

In 2002, Crespin retired from the civil service and dedicated herself to creating jewelry with beads. She also set up a permanent exhibition of old engravings and slavery in Gorée in her home on the island, which served as the basis for her work Trésors de l'iconographie du Sénégal colonial.

Crespin died on 6 February 2025, at the age of 88.

== Distinctions ==
- Knight of the Ordre des Arts et des Lettres
- Grand Cross of the National Order of Merit of Guinea
- Commander of the Ordre national du Mérite
