= Crispin S. Gregoire =

Dominican diplomat

H.E. Crispin S. Gregoire

Former Permanent Representative to the UN for the Commonwealth of Dominica
- In office 1 October 2002 – 1 February 2010

Personal details
- Born: 1956 (age 69–70) Commonwealth of Dominica
- Spouse: Elvira Oluchi-Gregoire

Crispin S. Gregoire (born 1956, Commonwealth of Dominica) is a businessman from Dominica and was the Permanent Representative to the United Nations for the Commonwealth of Dominica until 2010. He presented his credentials to Secretary-General Kofi Annan on 1 October 2002.

== Career ==
Gregoire currently directs a consulting practice focused on public-private partnerships in energy transition, democratic governance, climate resilience, and nonprofit management and governance.

As Special Advisor in the Cabinet of the 68th President of the UN General Assembly, Gregoire directed the organization and convening of the High Level Meeting of the General Assembly on Indigenous Peoples, also known as the first World Conference on Indigenous Peoples.

Following his tenure as a UN Ambassador/Permanent Representative, he served as Chief, Strategic Monitoring of Caribbean Country Offices at United Nations Development Program's Headquarters.

During his tenure as a UN Ambassador, he was the visionary founder of the United Nations International Day of Remembrance of the Victims of Slavery and the Transatlantic Slave Trade, and a co-founder of the United Nations Slavery Memorial.

Gregoire was Director of Consulting and Training for Africa and Latin America at BoardSource Inc. in Washington, D.C., prior to assuming his position at the United Nations. He has worked in many organizations, some of which include Program Consultant for the Ford Foundation in New York City, Program Adviser to TechnoServe, Inc. in Norwalk, Connecticut, Acting Director for the New York City Department of Health's Injury Prevention Program, Dominica Field Office Director for the Save the Children Federation in Westport, Connecticut, Associate Producer for CBS Evening News in New York, a Program Associate for Appropriate Technology International in Washington, D.C., and an Adjunct Instructor at Brooklyn College in New York.

== Education ==
Gregoire has a Bachelor of Arts in International Relations degree from Columbia University, and a Master of Education degree in Adult Education and Economic Development from Howard University. He speaks fluent English and Dominica Kweyol, and is efficient in Spanish and French.

== See also ==
- List of current permanent representatives to the United Nations
