= The Witch and the Hundred Knight 2 =

2017 video game

- US cover art
- Developer: Nippon Ichi Software
- Publishers: JP: Nippon Ichi Software; AS: Sega; WW: NIS America
- Director: Kenta Asano
- Producer: Souhei Niikawa
- Composer: Tenpei Sato
- Platform: PlayStation 4
- Release: JP: February 23, 2017; AS: May 25, 2017; NA: March 27, 2018; EU: March 30, 2018; AU: April 13, 2018
- Genre: Action role-playing game
- Mode: Single-player

The Witch and the Hundred Knight 2 (魔女と百騎兵2, Majo to Hyakkihei 2) is an action role-playing video game developed and published by Nippon Ichi Software for the PlayStation 4. A sequel to The Witch and the Hundred Knight, the game released in February 2017 in Japan and in March 2018 in North America and Europe. It takes place in a different universe as the original title, and centers around Amalie, a member of an anti-witch organization, who secretly enlists the help of Chelka - a witch inhabiting the body of her younger sister Milm - to uncover a conspiracy within the organization and save the world of Kevala from disaster, with the assistance of the mysterious Hundred Knight. The game received mixed reviews from critics, who praised the art and music, but criticized the game's story and characters, repetitive combat, and lack of innovation compared to its predecessor.

== Gameplay ==
The Witch and the Hundred Knight 2 is an action role-playing game with a top-down isometric view. Players fight their way through a variety of levels as Hundred Knight, a magical creature that can be equipped with five types of weapons: swords, hammers, staffs, lances, and spears. Each weapon type differs in attack range, speed, and motion. By changing the order of use, players create many different combos.

== Plot ==
The world of Kevala is corrupted by the Witch Disease, an illness developed in children under age 10. Its cause is unknown. A third eye appears on the forehead of those infected with the Witch Disease, and when the eye opens they awaken as a witch. A girl named Amalie lives in a remote village after she lost her parents to a witch. Her younger sister Milm is the only family she has left. One day, Milm suddenly disappears and Amalie eagerly searches for her. When she is about to give up, Milm shows up again, covered in mud and with the witch's eye on her forehead.

Upon the beginning of the game's events, Milm is seen being operated on by the Weiss Ritter, an anti-witch organization, to cure the Witch Disease. It seems to fail and result in her death, but then a witch named Chelka awakens in Milm's body and destroys the entire building. This also causes Milm's Hundred Knight doll to come alive as well, and begin fighting for Chelka. When Amalie discovers that Milm is alive and Chelka is in her body, the two of them move into the abandoned Durga Castle and Hundred Knight starts obeying Amalie's orders as well. They forge an uneasy relationship, with Amalie unwilling to hurt Chelka, and Chelka unable to harm Amalie lest Milm come to the surface.

The Hundred Knight's exploits defeating the witch Isabel are credited to Amalie, causing her to become a Holy Valkyrie. However, when Amalie realizes that the Valkyries are murdering the children with the Witch Disease that the WR cannot operate on, she starts to doubt her mission. She is sent to defeat Prim, the world's strongest witch, which the Hundred Knight does successfully, but they find records of misdeeds by the WR in Prim's castle. This leads Amalie to infiltrate the WR and discover that they have been covering up the fact that there is no cure for the Witch Disease, and she is actually an artificial witch who was never "cured".

This causes her to be forced to fight one of the Valkyries, defeating her. For this, she is branded a traitor and sentenced to death, though she surrenders willingly, losing hope that Milm will ever return to normal. However, Chelka rescues her. They defeat another of the Valkyries and, later, go after Theodore, the leader of the WR, though they are stopped by the final Valkyrie, Gabrielle, who reveals herself to be Francesca, the first witch, and actually a "Holy Maiden". They attempt to kidnap Milm, whose third eye is actually one of the three eyes of the all-powerful witch Rangda, and use the eyes to rebirth the world into a twisted utopia, but they are stopped with the help of Prim. However, the end of the world continues regardless.

Chelka and the others realize that the world has been going in an endless cycle for thousands of years, and discover a supply of mana that was removed from the cycle. They decide to absorb this "Manathree" and fight Rangda directly to break the cycle and prevent the world's destruction. The Hundred Knight succeeds in defeating Rangda's illusions and Chelka destroys Rangda herself. They realize that Rangda created the cycle and isolated the world from the multiverse to prevent the godlike interdimensional being, Niike, from destroying it as he did once before. Chelka decides to return the world to the multiverse, and all the other characters, living and dead, are reborn in a new world as non-witches.

== Development ==
The Witch and the Hundred Knight 2 was first revealed in May 2015 through a short video in which Nippon Ichi Software confirmed that the game was in development. In October 2016, director Kenta Asano told Dengeki PlayStation that the PlayStation 4 was chosen as platform for the game because The Witch and the Hundred Knight Revival, an enhanced port of the original game for the system, was well received. A Winter 2017 release was announced at the same time. Later that month, the February 23 release date was revealed. The game was released in North America and Europe in March 2018.

== Reception ==
Reception

Aggregate score
Aggregator	Score
Metacritic	61/100

Review scores
Publication	Score
Eurogamer	6/10
Famitsu	33/40
IGN	6.3/10
RPGFan	45/100

The Witch and the Hundred Knight 2 received a 33/40 score in issue 1472 of Famitsu upon its Japanese release. Commercially, the game was not as successful in Japan as its predecessor. According to Media Create, only 13,421 physical copies of the game were sold during the week of release, compared to 49,209 copies in the week of launch of the first game for PlayStation 3 in 2013.

The game saw similar mixed reviews to its predecessor upon its Western release, with an aggregate score of 61 out of 100 on Metacritic, based on 24 reviews.

Antonio Savino of Eurogamer Italia rated the game 6/10, saying that while the gameplay and customization were "engaging", the narration style combined with the game's repetitive levels makes the game "too boring" and "not very satisfying".

Alana Hagues of RPGFan rated the game 45/100, saying that while she never played the original, the sequel was "one of the most mind-numbing experiences I've had to wade through in recent years". While praising the main character's ability to switch between facets, and the game's combat, she criticized the story, saying it "goes hardly anywhere", and the characters, saying "I hated nearly everyone". Stating that Chelka was "the most irritating and bratty interpretation of a witch I've ever encountered", she said that while Amalie was bearable, she nevertheless "never gets a chance to prove herself". She also criticized the fact that "the first game's unique environments have been scrapped in favour of procedurally generated dungeons," stating that "the lack of variety wore very thin very quickly". In conclusion, she states that "I'd struggle to recommend the game even to fans of the original".

Joshua Carpenter of RPGamer rated the game an even lower 1.5/5, calling it "the worst gaming experience I've had in recent memory". With regards to the story, he called Amalie "a sympathetic, likable character", but criticized her lack of prominence in the gameplay, saying that "every time a crisis happens, she is shunted aside, and Hundred Knight comes to save the day". Saying that the combat "ultimately dooms" the game due to how the weapons handle, he also stated that with the upgrade system, "the execution is lacking". Declaring that the game had "repetitive dungeons, bad combat, and poorly-designed boss encounters", he concluded that the game "doesn't have enough good ideas to be worth saving".
