= Crispin (surname) =

Crispin is a surname. Notable people with the surname include:

- Ann C. Crispin (1950–2013), American science fiction writer
- Edmund Crispin (1921–1978), pseudonym of Robert Bruce Montgomery, an English crime writer
- Gilbert Crispin (c. 1055 – 1117), Christian author and Anglo-Norman monk
- Jessa Crispin (born 1978), editor-in-chief of Bookslut, a litblog and webzine
- Joe Crispin (born 1979), American professional basketball player
- Jon Crispin (born 1981), American collegiate basketball player
- Mark Crispin (born 1956), inventor of the IMAP protocol

== See also ==
- Crespin (surname), people with this surname
