= HMS Crispin =

Two ships of the Royal Navy have been named HMS Crispin:

- HMS Crispin (1940) was an Ocean boarding vessel requisitioned in 1940 and lost in 1941
- HMS Crispin (R68) was a C-class destroyer ordered as Craccher and launched in 1945. She was sold to Pakistan in 1956 and renamed Jahangir.
