= Xerostomia =

Dryness of the mouth

- Other names: Dry mouth, dry mouth syndrome
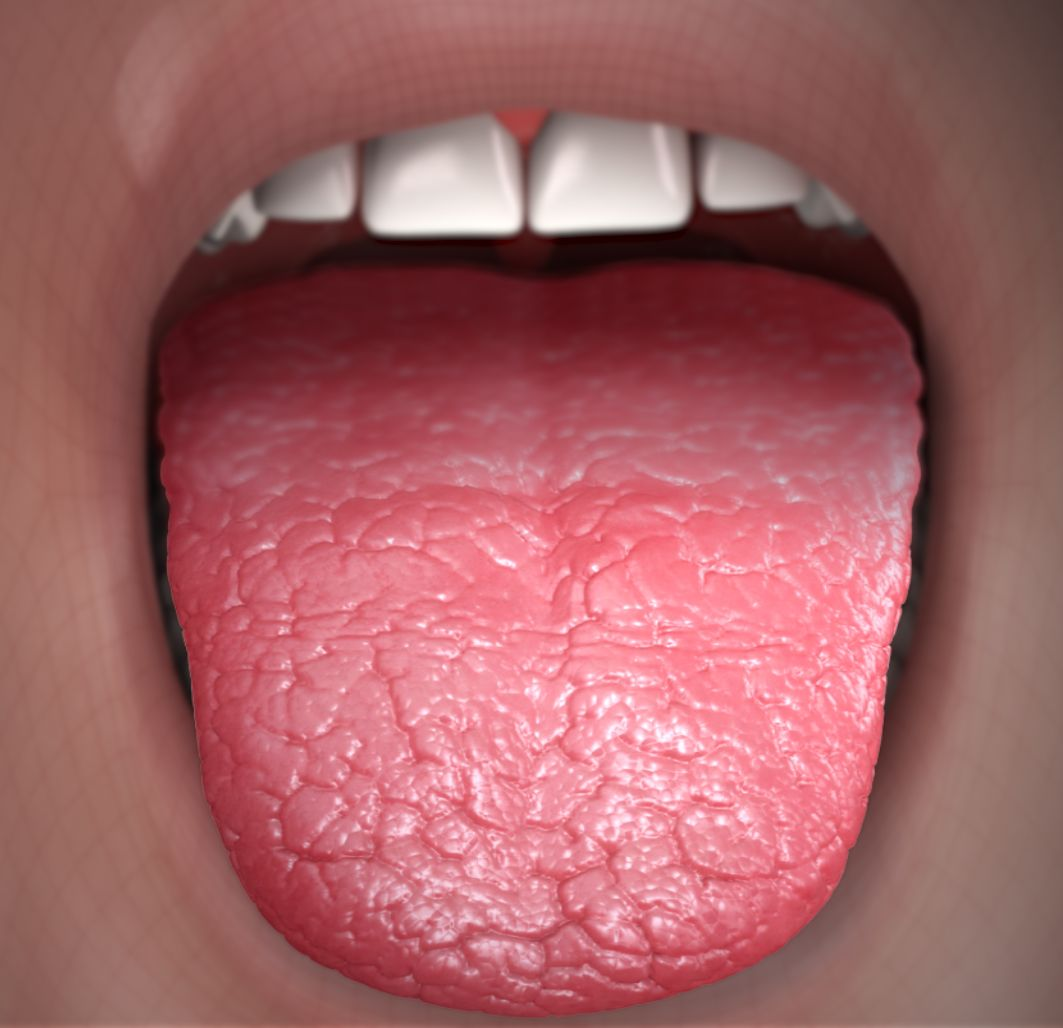
- 3D medical illustration still showing decreased or insufficient functioning of salivary glands.

Xerostomia, also known as dry mouth, is a subjective complaint of dryness in the mouth, which may be associated with a change in the composition of saliva, reduced salivary flow, or have no identifiable cause.

This symptom is very common and is often seen as a side effect of many types of medication. It is more common in older people (mostly because individuals in this group are more likely to take several medications) and in people who breathe through their mouths. Dehydration, radiotherapy involving the salivary glands, chemotherapy and several diseases can cause reduced salivation (hyposalivation), or a change in saliva consistency and hence a complaint of xerostomia. Sometimes there is no identifiable cause, and there may sometimes be a psychogenic reason for the complaint.

== Definition ==
Xerostomia is the subjective sensation of dry mouth, which is often (but not always) associated with hypofunction of the salivary glands. The term is derived from the Greek words ξηρός (xeros) meaning "dry" and στόμα (stoma) meaning "mouth". A drug or substance that increases the rate of salivary flow is termed a sialogogue.

Hyposalivation is a clinical diagnosis that is made based on the history and examination, but reduced salivary flow rates have been given objective definitions. Salivary gland hypofunction has been defined as any objectively demonstrable reduction in whole and/or individual gland flow rates. An unstimulated whole saliva flow rate in a normal person is 0.3–0.4 ml per minute, and below 0.1 ml per minute is significantly abnormal. A stimulated saliva flow rate less than 0.5 ml per gland in 5 minutes or less than 1 ml per gland in 10 minutes is decreased. The term subjective xerostomia is sometimes used to describe the symptom in the absence of any clinical evidence of dryness. Xerostomia may also result from a change in composition of saliva (from serous to mucous). Salivary gland dysfunction is an umbrella term for the presence of xerostomia, salivary gland hyposalivation, and hypersalivation.

== Signs and symptoms ==
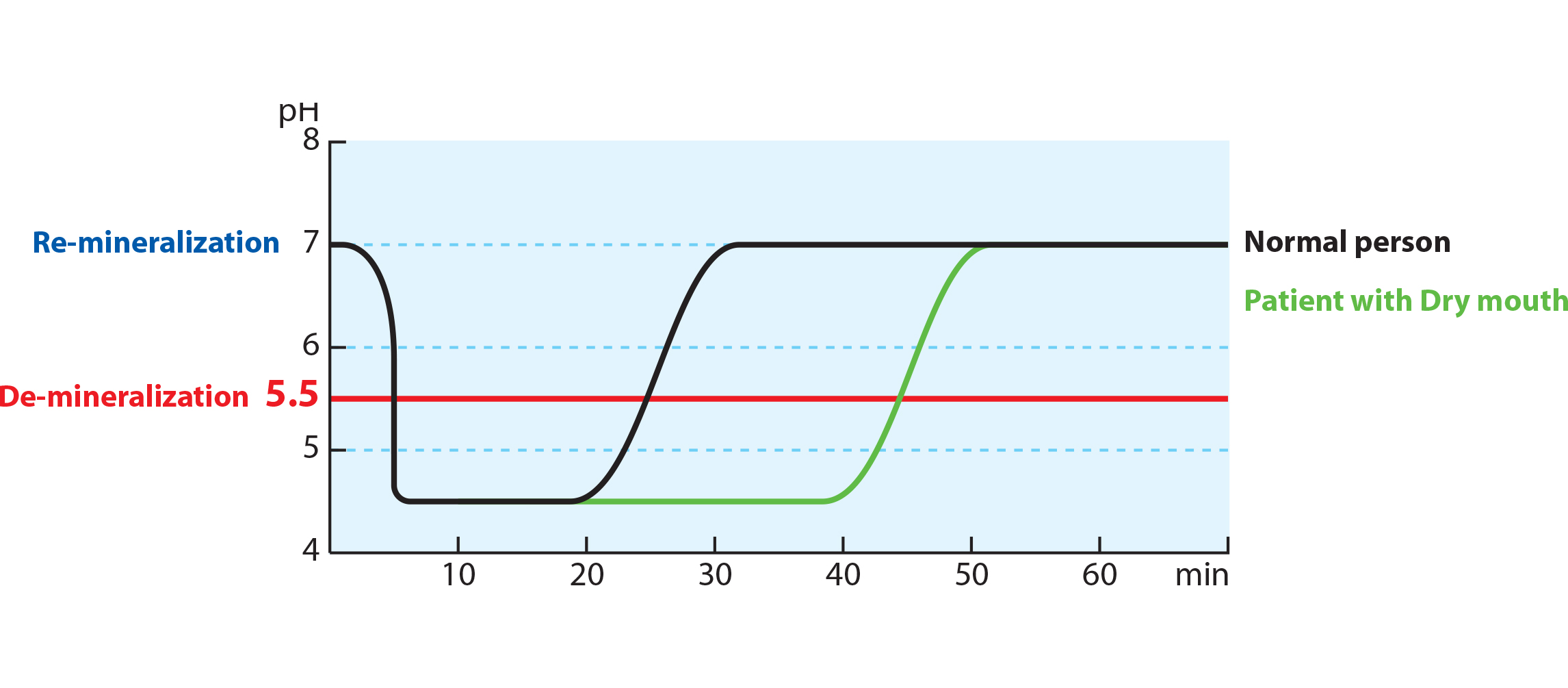
Diagram depicting mouth acidity changes after consuming food high in carbohydrates. Within 5 minutes the acidity in the mouth increases as the pH drops. In persons with normal salivary flow rate, acid will be neutralized in about 20 minutes. People with dry mouth often will take twice as long to neutralize mouth acid, leaving them at higher risk of tooth decay and acid erosion

Hyposalivation may give the following signs and symptoms:

- Dental caries (xerostomia related caries) – Without the buffering effects of saliva, tooth decay becomes a common feature and may progress much more aggressively than it would otherwise ("rampant caries"). It may affect tooth surfaces that are normally spared, e.g., cervical caries and root surface caries. This is often seen in patients who have had radiotherapy involving the major salivary glands, termed radiation-induced caries. Therefore, it is important that any products used in managing dry mouth symptoms are sugar-free, as the presence of sugars in the mouth support the growth of oral bacteria, resulting in acid production and development of dental caries. In addition, reduced salivary flow and altered composition can result in a lowered buffering capacity and pH, which contributes to dental caries and tooth surface demineralization. Research shows that enamel demineralization typically begins when oral pH drops below about 5.5, while root dentin, being more vulnerable, can start to erode at a higher pH of around 6.7. Many saliva substitutes and oral moisturizers are formulated with a pH below 6.7, which can pose a risk to dentin over time.
- Acid erosion. Saliva acts as a buffer and helps to prevent demineralization of teeth.
- Oral candidiasis – A loss of the antimicrobial actions of saliva may also lead to opportunistic infection with Candida species.
- Ascending (suppurative) sialadenitis – an infection of the major salivary glands (usually the parotid gland) that may be recurrent. It is associated with hyposalivation, as bacteria are able to enter the ductal system against the diminished flow of saliva. There may be swollen salivary glands even without acute infection, possibly caused by autoimmune involvement.
- Dysgeusia – altered taste sensation (e.g., a metallic taste) and dysosmia, altered sense of smell.
- Intraoral halitosis – possibly due to increased activity of halitogenic biofilm on the posterior dorsal tongue (although dysgeusia may cause a complaint of nongenuine halitosis in the absence of hyposalivation).
- Burning mouth syndrome – a burning or tingling sensation in the mouth.
- Saliva that appears thick or ropey.
- Mucosa that appears dry.
- A lack of saliva pooling in the floor of the mouth during examination.
- Dysphagia – difficulty swallowing and chewing, especially when eating dry foods. Food may stick to the tissues during eating.
- The tongue may stick to the palate, causing a clicking noise during speech, or the lips may stick together.
- Gloves or a dental mirror may stick to the tissues.
- Fissured tongue with atrophy of the filiform papillae and a lobulated, erythematous appearance of the tongue.
- Saliva cannot be "milked" (expressed) from the parotid duct.
- Difficulty wearing dentures, e.g., when swallowing or speaking. There may be generalized mucosal soreness and ulceration of the areas covered by the denture.
- Mouth soreness and oral mucositis.
- Lipstick or food may stick to the teeth.
- A need to sip drinks frequently while talking or eating.
- Dry, sore, and cracked lips and angles of mouth.
- Thirst.

However, sometimes the clinical findings do not correlate with the symptoms experienced. For example, a person with signs of hyposalivation may not complain of xerostomia. Conversely a person who reports experiencing xerostomia may not show signs of reduced salivary secretions (subjective xerostomia). In the latter scenario, there are often other oral symptoms suggestive of oral dysesthesia ("burning mouth syndrome"). Some symptoms outside the mouth may occur together with xerostomia.

These include:

- Xerophthalmia (dry eyes).
- Inability to cry.
- Blurred vision.
- Photophobia (light intolerance).
- Dryness of other mucosae, e.g., nasal, laryngeal, and/or genital.
- Burning sensation.
- Itching or grittiness.
- Dysphonia (voice changes).

There may also be other systemic signs and symptoms if there is an underlying cause such as Sjögren's disease, for example, joint pain due to associated rheumatoid arthritis.

== Cause ==
The differential of hyposalivation significantly overlaps with that of xerostomia. A reduction in saliva production to about 50% of the normal unstimulated level will usually result in the sensation of dry mouth. Altered saliva composition may also be responsible for xerostomia.

=== Physiological ===
Salivary flow rate is decreased during sleep, which may lead to a transient sensation of dry mouth upon waking. This disappears with eating or drinking or with oral hygiene. When associated with halitosis, this is sometimes termed "morning breath". Dry mouth is also a common sensation during periods of anxiety, probably owing to enhanced sympathetic drive. During periods of stress, the human body responds in a 'fight or flight' state which interferes with the saliva flow in the mouth. Dehydration is known to cause hyposalivation, the result of the body trying to conserve fluid. Physiologic age-related changes in salivary gland tissues may lead to a modest reduction in salivary output and partially explain the increased prevalence of xerostomia in older people. However, polypharmacy is thought to be the major cause in this group, with no significant decreases in salivary flow rate being likely to occur through aging alone.

=== Drug induced xerostomia ===
Table 1 – Medications associated with xerostomia
- Psychoactive medications such as antidepressants, opiates, antipsychotics, and medical cannabis
- Antihypertensives
- Bronchodilators
- Proton-pump inhibitors
- Antihistamines
- Diuretics
- Antineoplastics

Aside from physiological causes of xerostomia, iatrogenic effects of medications are the most common cause. A medication which is known to cause xerostomia may be termed xerogenic. Over 400 medications are associated with xerostomia. Although drug induced xerostomia is commonly reversible, the conditions for which these medications are prescribed are frequently chronic. The likelihood of xerostomia increases in relation to the total number of medications taken, whether the individual medications are xerogenic or not. The sensation of dryness usually starts shortly after starting the offending medication or after increasing the dose. Anticholinergic, sympathomimetic, or diuretic drugs are usually responsible.

=== Sjögren's syndrome ===
Xerostomia may be caused by autoimmune conditions which damage saliva-producing cells. Sjögren's syndrome is one such disease, and it is associated with symptoms including fatigue, myalgia and arthralgia. The disease is characterised by inflammatory changes in the moisture-producing glands throughout the body, leading to reduced secretions from glands that produce saliva, tears and other secretions throughout the body. Primary Sjögren's syndrome is the combination of dry eyes and xerostomia. Secondary Sjögren's syndrome is identical to primary form but with the addition of a combination of other connective tissue disorders such as systemic lupus erythematosus or rheumatoid arthritis.

=== Celiac disease ===
Xerostomia may be the only symptom of celiac disease, especially in adults, who often have no obvious digestive symptoms.

=== Radiation therapy ===
Radiation therapy for cancers of the head and neck (including brachytherapy for thyroid cancers) where the salivary glands are close to or within the field irradiated is another major cause of xerostomia. A radiation dose of 52 Gy is sufficient to cause severe salivary dysfunction. Radiotherapy for oral cancers usually involves up to 70 Gy of radiation, often given along with chemotherapy which may also have a damaging effect on saliva production. This side effect is a result of radiation damage of the parasympathetic nerves. Formation of salivary gland ducts depends on the secretion of a neuropeptide from the parasympathetic nerves, while development of the end buds of the salivary gland depends on acetylcholine from the parasympathetic nerves.

=== Sicca syndrome ===
"Sicca" simply means dryness. Sicca syndrome is not a specific condition, and there are varying definitions, but the term can describe oral and eye dryness that is not caused by autoimmune diseases (e.g., Sjögren syndrome).

=== Other causes ===
Oral dryness may also be caused by mouth breathing, usually caused by partial obstruction of the upper respiratory tract. Examples include hemorrhage, vomiting, diarrhea, and fever.

Alcohol may be involved in the cause of salivary gland disease, liver disease, or dehydration.

Smoking is another possible cause. Other recreational drugs, such as methamphetamine, cannabis, hallucinogens, or heroin, may be implicated.

Hormonal disorders, such as poorly controlled diabetes, chronic graft versus host disease, or low fluid intake in people undergoing hemodialysis for renal impairment, may also result in xerostomia due to dehydration.

Nerve damage can be a cause of oral dryness. An injury to the face or surgery can cause nerve damage to the head and neck area which can affect the nerves that are associated with the salivary flow.

Xerostomia may be a consequence of infection with hepatitis C virus (HCV).

A rare cause of salivary gland dysfunction may be sarcoidosis.

Infection with Human Immunodeficiency Virus/Acquired immunodeficiency Syndrome (AIDS) can cause a related salivary gland disease known as Diffuse Infiltrative Lymphocytosis Syndrome (DILS).

Similar to taste dysfunction, xerostomia is one of the most prevalent and persistent oral symptoms associated with COVID-19. Despite a close association with COVID-19, xerostomia, dry mouth and hyposalivation tend to be overlooked in COVID-19 patients and survivors, unlike ageusia, dysgeusia and hypogeusia.

== Diagnostic approach ==
A diagnosis of hyposalivation is based predominantly on the clinical signs and symptoms. The Challacombe scale maybe used to classify the extent of dryness. The rate of the salivary flow in an individual's mouth can also be measured. There is little correlation between symptoms and objective tests of salivary flow, such as sialometry. This test is simple and noninvasive, and involves measurement of all the saliva a patient can produce during a certain time, achieved by dribbling into a container. Sialometery can yield measures of stimulated salivary flow or unstimulated salivary flow. Stimulated salivary flow rate is calculated using a stimulant such as 10% citric acid dropped onto the tongue, and collection of all the saliva that flows from one of the parotid papillae over five or ten minutes. Unstimulated whole saliva flow rate more closely correlates with symptoms of xerostomia than stimulated salivary flow rate. Sialography involves introduction of radio-opaque dye such as iodine into the duct of a salivary gland. It may show blockage of a duct due to a calculus. Salivary scintiscanning using technetium is rarely used. Other medical imaging that may be involved in the investigation include chest x-ray (to exclude sarcoidosis), ultrasonography and magnetic resonance imaging (to exclude Sjögren's syndrome or neoplasia). A minor salivary gland biopsy, usually taken from the lip, may be carried out if there is a suspicion of organic disease of the salivary glands. Blood tests and urinalysis may be involved to exclude a number of possible causes. To investigate xerophthalmia, the Schirmer test of lacrimal flow may be indicated. Slit-lamp examination may also be carried out.

== Treatment ==
The successful treatment of xerostomia is difficult to achieve and often unsatisfactory. This involves finding any correctable cause and removing it if possible, but in many cases it is not possible to correct the xerostomia itself, and treatment is symptomatic, and also focuses on preventing tooth decay through improving oral hygiene. Where the symptom is caused by hyposalivation secondary to underlying chronic disease, xerostomia can be considered permanent or even progressive. The management of salivary gland dysfunction may involve the use of saliva substitutes and/or saliva stimulants:

- Saliva substitutes – These are viscous products which are applied to the oral mucosa, which can be found in the form of sprays, gels, oils, mouthwashes, mouth rinses, pastilles or viscous liquids. This includes water, artificial salivas (mucin-based, carboxymethylcellulose-based), and other substances (milk, vegetable oil):
  - Mucin Spray: 4 Trials have been completed on the effects of Mucin Spray on Xerostomia, overall there is no strong evidence showing that Mucin Spray is more effective than a placebo in reducing the symptoms of dry mouth.
  - Mucin Lozenge: Only 1 trial (Gravenmade 1993) has been completed regarding the effectiveness of Mucin Lozenges. Whilst it was assessed as being at high risk of bias, it showed that Mucin Lozenges were ineffective when compared to a placebo.
  - Mucoadhesive Disk: These disks are stuck to the palate and they contain lubricating agents, flavouring agents and some antimicrobial agents. One trial (Kerr 2010) assessed their effectiveness against a placebo disk. Strangely, patients from both groups (placebo and the real disk) reported an increase in subjective oral moistness. No adverse effects were reported. More research is needed in this area before conclusions are drawn.
- Biotene oral Balance Gel & toothpaste: One trial has been completed (Epstein 1999) regarding the effectiveness of Biotene Oral Balance gel & toothpaste. The results showed that Biotene products were "more effective than control and reduced dry mouth on waking".
- Saliva stimulants – organic acids (ascorbic acid, malic acid), chewing gum, parasympathomimetic drugs (choline esters, e.g. pilocarpine hydrochloride, cholinesterase inhibitors), and other substances (sugar-free or xylitol mints, xylitol mouthwash, nicotinamide). Medications which stimulate saliva production traditionally have been administered through oral tablets, which the patient goes on to swallow, although some saliva stimulants can also be found in the form of toothpastes. Lozenges, which are retained in the mouth and then swallowed are becoming more and more popular. Lozenges are soft and gentle on the mouth and there is a belief that prolonged contact with the oral mucosa mechanically stimulates saliva production.
  - Pilocarpine: A study by Taweechaisupapong in 2006 showed no 'statistical significant improvement in oral dryness and saliva production compared to placebo' when administering pilocarpine lozenges.
  - Physostigmine Gel: A study by Knosravini in 2009 showed a reduction in the oral dryness and a 5 times increase in saliva following physostigmine treatment.
  - Chewing gum increases saliva production but there is no strong evidence that it improves dry mouth symptoms.
  - The Cochrane oral health group concluded 'there is insufficient evidence to determine whether pilocarpine or physostigmine' are effective treatments for Xerostomia. More research is needed.
  - Dentirol chewing gum (xylitol): A study by Risheim in 1993 showed that when subjects had 2 sticks of gum up to 5 x daily, the gum gave subjective dry mouth symptom relief in approximately 1/3 of participants but no change in SWS (stimulated whole saliva).
  - Profylin lozenge (xylitol/sorbitol):A study by Risheim in 1993 showed that when subjects had 1 lozenge 4 to 8 x daily, Profylin lozenges gave subjective dry mouth symptom relief in approximately 1/3 of participants but no change in SWS (stimulated whole saliva).

Saliva substitutes can improve xerostomia, but tend not to improve the other problems associated with salivary gland dysfunction. Parasympathomimetic drugs (saliva stimulants) such as pilocarpine may improve xerostomia symptoms and other problems associated with salivary gland dysfunction, but the evidence for treatment of radiation-induced xerostomia is limited. Both stimulants and substitutes relieve symptoms to some extent. Salivary stimulants are probably only useful in people with some remaining detectable salivary function. A systematic review compromising of 36 randomised controlled trials for the treatment of dry mouth found that there was no strong evidence to suggest that a specific topical therapy is effective. This review also states that topical therapies can be expected to provide only short-term effects, which are reversible. The review reported limited evidence that oxygenated glycerol triester spray was more effective than electrolyte sprays. Sugar free chewing gum increases saliva production but there is no strong evidence that it improves symptoms. Plus, there is no clear evidence to suggest whether chewing gum is more or less effective as a treatment. There is a suggestion that intraoral devices and integrated mouthcare systems may be effective in reducing symptoms, but there was a lack of strong evidence. A systematic review of the management of radiotherapy-induced xerostomia with parasympathomimetic drugs found that there was limited evidence to support the use of pilocarpine in the treatment of radiation-induced salivary gland dysfunction. It was suggested that, barring any contraindications, a trial of the drug be offered in the above group (at a dose of five mg three times per day to minimize side effects). Improvements can take up to twelve weeks. However, pilocarpine is not always successful in improving xerostomia symptoms. The review also concluded that there was little evidence to support the use of other parasympathomimetics in this group. Another systematic review showed, that there is some low-quality evidence to suggest that amifostine prevents the feeling of dry mouth or reduce the risk of moderate to severe xerostomia in people receiving radiotherapy to the head and neck (with or without chemotherapy) in the short- (end of radiotherapy) to medium-term (three months postradiotherapy). But, it is less clear whether or not this effect is sustained to 12 months postradiotherapy.

A 2013 review looking at non-pharmacological interventions reported a lack of evidence to support the effects of electrostimulation devices, or acupuncture, on symptoms of dry mouth.

== Epidemiology ==
Xerostomia is a very common symptom. A conservative estimate of prevalence is about 20% in the general population, with increased prevalences in females (up to 30%) and the elderly (up to 50%). Estimates of the prevalence of persistent dry mouth vary between 10 and 50%.

== History ==
Xerostomia has been used as a test to detect lies, which relied on emotional inhibition of salivary secretions to indicate possible incrimination.

== See also ==
- Xerosis (dry skin)
