= Crispian Scully =

Crispian Scully CBE (1945–2017) was emeritus professor of oral medicine at University College London, and author of Scully's Oral Medicine. He was an inaugural Fellow of the Academy of Medical Sciences (1998).
