= St Crispin Street Fair =

Annual funfair in Northampton, England

Coordinates: 52°14′17.35″N 0°53′46.9″W

6

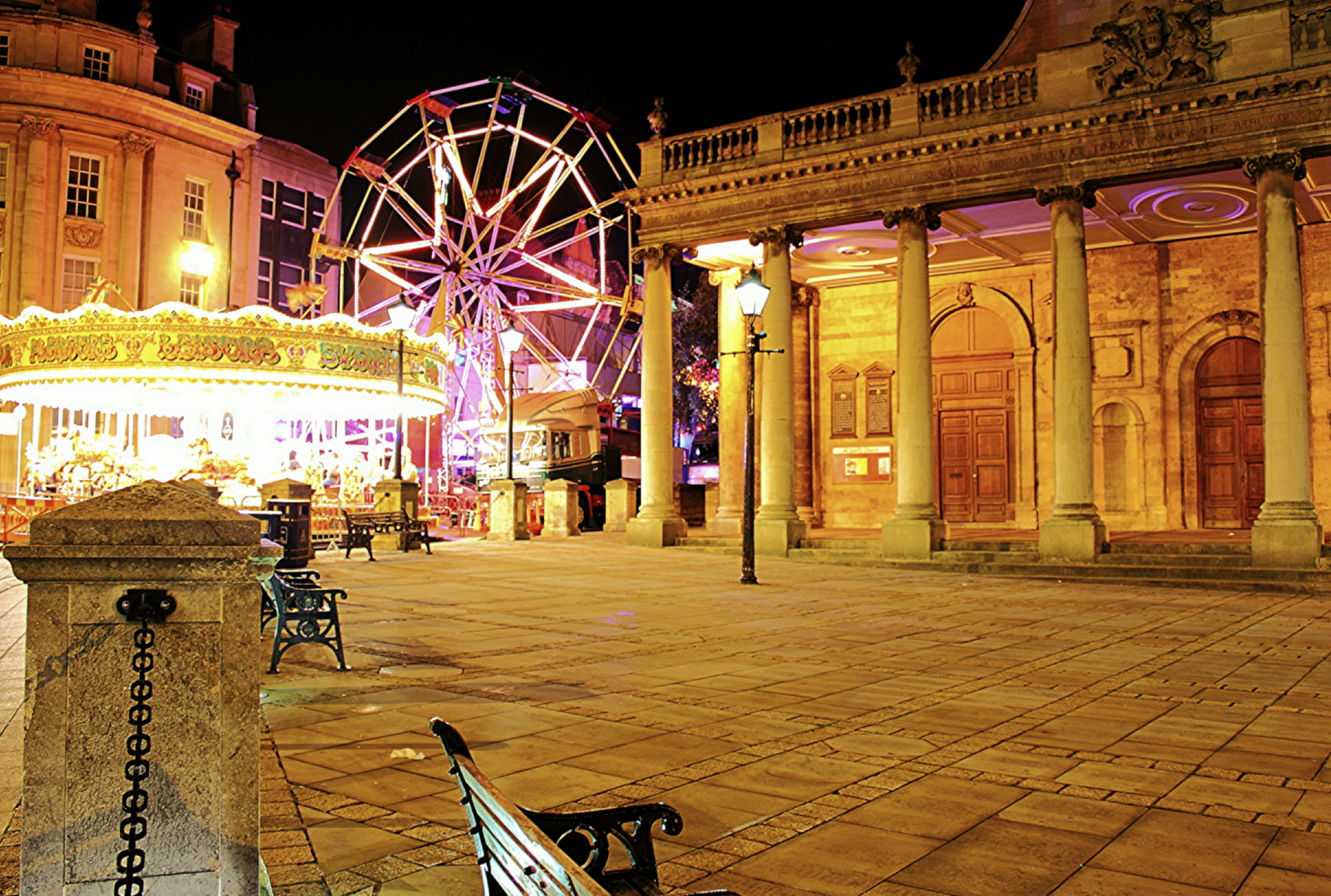
The fair in 2012

The St Crispin Street Fair was a fair held periodically from 1994 to 2004 in the Market Square of Northampton, England. It was organised by Northampton Borough Council.

The event was a travelling funfair with over 100 amusement rides, usually operating on several days of the October half-term school holiday with the precise days varying from year to year. In 2005, the Council abandoned the project due to financial reasons, but it was resumed in 2012. However, shop owners raised concerns about how the new fair could affect their business during Hallowe'en weekend. In 2014, the fair was held from 25 to 29 October with a large part of it held on a nearby car park. It was last organised from 21 to 29 October 2019.
