= Class of '09 (franchise) =

Visual novel video game series

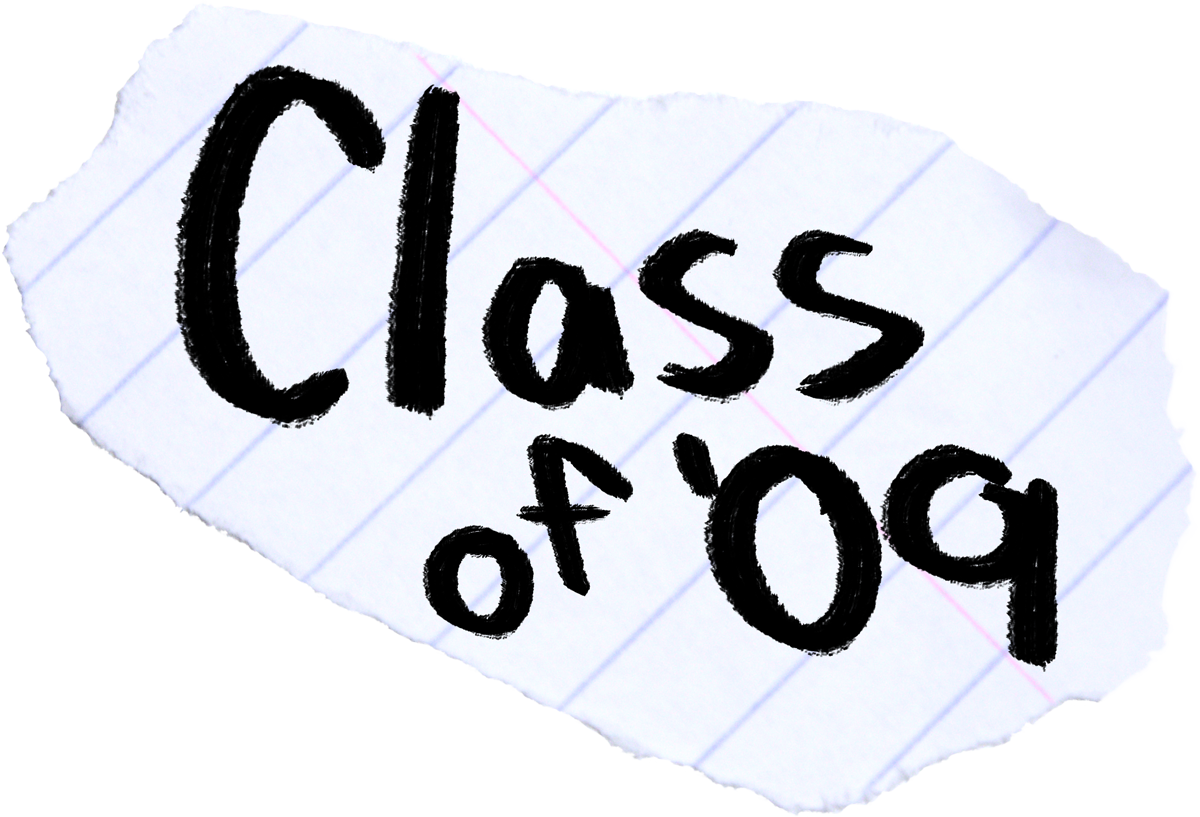
- Created by: Max "SBN3" Field

Films and television
- Short films: Class of '09: Give Me a Fry (2023); Class of '09: The Anime (2024); Class of '09: Kicked Out (2025); Class of '09: Lunch Table Beats (2026)

Games
- Video games: Class of '09 (2020/2021); Class of '09: The Re-Up (2023); Class of '09: The Flip Side (2024); Class of '09: Puzzle Showdown (2026)

Miscellaneous
- Publisher: Wrath Club
- Developer: Max "SBN3" Field
- Platforms: Windows macOS; Linux itch.io

Class of '09 is an American comedic video game series consisting of three visual novels and a puzzle video game. The series was developed and written by Max "SBN3" Field, who also voices several of the male characters, and published by Wrath Club for personal computers. Field has marketed the first installment as an "anti-visual novel", a "rejection sim", and an "interactive sitcom". The visual novels follow high school students Nicole (voiced by Elsie Lovelock) and Jecka (voiced by Kayli Mills), who quickly become friends, collaborating on various unethical schemes or attempts to bully, manipulate, and undermine their peers. Both characters live in a fictionalized version of Burke, Virginia, and regularly travel to the surrounding Washington metropolitan area. The first three installments in the series are set between the fall of 2007 and the Summer of 2009.

The first game, Class of '09, was released as freeware on itch.io on October 8, 2020, followed by a commercial release for Linux, macOS, and Windows on June 10, 2021. Class of '09: The Re-Up was released on June 1, 2023, and Class of '09: The Flip Side on September 23, 2024. A fourth game, Class of '09: Puzzle Showdown, was announced on June 12, 2026, with a release date of July 17, 2026; it departs from the visual novel format in favor of story-based puzzle gameplay.

The first two games received generally positive reviews from the independent outlets that covered them, with praise directed at their voice acting and comedic writing; The Flip Side received a more negative critical response. The series has also produced several animated shorts.

== Gameplay ==
Gameplay of Class of '09: The Re-Up. The protagonist, Nicole, confronts a guidance counselor over his behavior toward students.

The visual novels consist primarily of voiced dialogue interspersed with narrative choices, which the player selects through pop-up text messages on an on-screen mobile phone: a T-Mobile Sidekick in the first two games and a Motorola Razr in the third. Every line of dialogue in the trilogy is voice-acted, which reviewers have noted is uncommon for visual novels, particularly those produced in English.

The degree of interactivity varies across the series: the first game has 15 endings reached through frequent choice points, the second has seven, and the third has five, with longer non-interactive sequences between decisions. Unlocking an ending adds a new message to the phone on the title screen, usually describing events that follow that ending.

== Premise ==
In the first two games the player controls Nicole, a 17-year-old who matter-of-factly describes herself as a sociopath in the opening monologue. Nicole has moved repeatedly between states and school districts as a result of her mother's multiple divorces, and her estranged father has recently committed suicide by firearm (a fate at the end of one narrative thread, though by hanging; his suicide note only says "Nicole's fault"). She then enrolls at yet another new high school, identified in-game as simply as "LHS", in the Washington metropolitan area. Exterior shots are modeled on Lake Braddock Secondary School in Burke, Virginia, and most in-game text messages use the northern Virginia 703 area code.

=== Class of '09 ===
The first game covers Nicole's junior year, beginning in September 2007. Three classmates—Crispin, Jeffery, and Kylar (all voiced by SBN3)—pursue her romantically, and player choices determine how she responds. In keeping with the game's "rejection sim" framing, many routes involve Nicole turning her pursuers' own words and actions against them, humiliating them socially or provoking them into destructive behavior; outcomes across routes include an accidental death and a school shooting. Nicole's friend Jecka provides much of the game's exposition, including introductions to each of the three boys.

Other storylines center on adults at the school, including a photography teacher who attempts to recruit students into white-nationalist extremism, a gym coach who behaves sexually toward female students, and a guidance counselor who does the same. Nicole's abuse of alcohol and other drugs recur throughout the game. The game has 15 endings, with outcomes ranging from Nicole transferring schools again, to graduating, to dying by suicide. (One may immediately return to the point of divergence, however, an option provided by the game itself, which is personified as being florid as its characters.)

=== Class of '09: The Re-Up ===
The second game is set in the fall of 2008, during Nicole's senior year, and opens with the declaration "It's Not A Sequel Just The Re-Up" (stylized in all caps). It expands the roles of Nicole's classmates Ari (Kira Buckland), Megan (Tiana Camacho), Emily (Valerie Rose Lohman), Karen (Corinne Sudberg), and Kelly (Katy Johnson), who had minor parts in the first game. Depending on the route, Nicole can befriend, romantically pursue, bully, or otherwise antagonize these characters, and each character's personal problems are explored in the process. Jecka again supplies exposition on the supporting cast.

Other routes follow Nicole seeking money through illegal means after her circumstances deteriorate, including manufacturing and selling crack cocaine and performing sex work; in some of these storylines she exposes the secrets of the teachers at her school, such as drug addiction and the use of online prostitution services. The game has 13 opening scenarios, all involving Nicole skipping class, that converge at a shared decision point, with some route restrictions in place to preserve continuity. Routes are generally longer than in the first game, with less frequent decisions.

=== Class of '09: The Flip Side ===
The third game makes Jecka the player character. Its routes are split between April 2008, running parallel to events of the first game, and June 2009, shortly after Jecka and Nicole graduate from high school. Storylines depict Jecka's home life with her abusive father, a coercive sexual relationship initiated by her history teacher Mr. Katz, and her involvement in foot-fetish sex work to pay household bills. In one of the routes, Jecka drinks heavily while struggling with early adulthood; in another, she and former classmate Kelly discover that a shopping mall is being used as a front for distributing child sexual abuse material (CSAM). Nicole appears as a supporting character and, in some routes, acts antagonistically toward Jecka; two of the five routes also depict Jecka rationalizing her role in another character's death. The game has five endings, the fewest in the series.

=== Class of '09: Puzzle Showdown ===
The fourth game replaces the visual novel format with a tile-matching design resembling the Puzzle League series. The central plot concerns a figure known as "the Puzzler" (Stuart Zagnit), challenging the protagonists of the first three games to a series of Match-3 competitions after they click on an internet spam ad offering a free cell phone. Within the narrative, the female characters are generally depicted as disinterested in or annoyed by the competition. In contrast, other characters exhibit strong engagement; for example, Jeffery becomes highly devoted to the game. Additionally, several male characters, including Chustler (Chain Hustler), a parody of Chet Hanks depicted as a tanned white man affecting an appropriated accent, taunt the female characters into competing against them after being confronted about their misogynistic behavior.

Notably, Puzzle Showdown is the first entry with moments that take place significantly after the protagonists' graduation from high school. Kelly, a supporting character in the earlier games, becomes a major protagonist in a secondary storyline, with one route involving her becoming a far-right talk radio host some time after graduating from university, and another following her into her 30s as she founds a nonprofit charity and runs for political office while facing a scandal from her past.

== Themes ==
Recurring subjects across the series include sexual abuse, drug abuse, depression, self-harm, suicide, bullying, radicalization, gun violence, the underground economy, internet addiction, toxic video game culture, sex work, and misogyny. Reviewers have observed that the series' adult authority figures—teachers, counselors, and other officials responsible for protecting teenagers—are consistently depicted as corrupt, predatory, or ineffective. Pedophilia is also referred to.

Field has said that the games' more serious plot elements are drawn from real accounts, including a social media post by a young woman describing a hospitalization after an overdose, and from his own observations of inappropriate teacher–student dynamics in American schools, which he described as "stuff you don't realize is weird when you're a kid".

Critics have characterized the series in differing terms: Natalie.TF reads the trilogy as principally concerned with Nicole's trauma-driven self-destruction, while The Refined Geek describes its world as one in which every character is dysfunctional. The Mary Sue criticized The Flip Side's extended depictions of Jecka's exploitation—including her relationship with Mr. Katz and her fetish sex work—arguing that they functioned as spectacle rather than satire.

== Adaptations ==
An animated short, Class of '09: Give Me a Fry (originally titled: Class of '09: The Anime Short), was released on October 23, 2023. A 12-minute animated pilot, Class of '09: The Anime Pilot, followed on December 14, 2024. Two further shorts have been released: Class of '09: Kicked Out on July 2, 2025, and Class of '09: Lunch Table Beats on March 13, 2026.

== Reception ==
The original Class of '09 received generally positive reviews from independent gaming sites, which praised its voice acting, comedic writing, and willingness to address taboo subject matter within the visual novel format. 3rd-Strike noted that the experience became progressively more depressing as routes were explored, and The Refined Geek wrote that the game's commitment to making every character repellent was both its defining quality and a potential limitation.

The Flip Side was reviewed more negatively. The Mary Sue called it "a weak ending to a beloved trilogy", criticizing its reduced player agency, the shift in Nicole's characterization, and its extended depictions of Jecka's abuse. Natalie.TF argued that the smaller number of longer routes placed greater narrative weight on each one, and found that three of the five endings failed to deliver satisfying conclusions, including one that the reviewer felt killed off a popular character purely for shock value. User reviews of The Flip Side on Steam are rated "mixed", in contrast to the "overwhelmingly positive" user ratings of the first two games.

Apple's App Store has declined to host the series, citing its content. Field has criticized the decision, arguing that the platform permits games depicting graphic violence, such as Grand Theft Auto: San Andreas, while refusing a visual novel about issues faced by teenage girls.
