= The Chequers, Potters Bar =

Pub in Hertfordshire, England

The Chequers
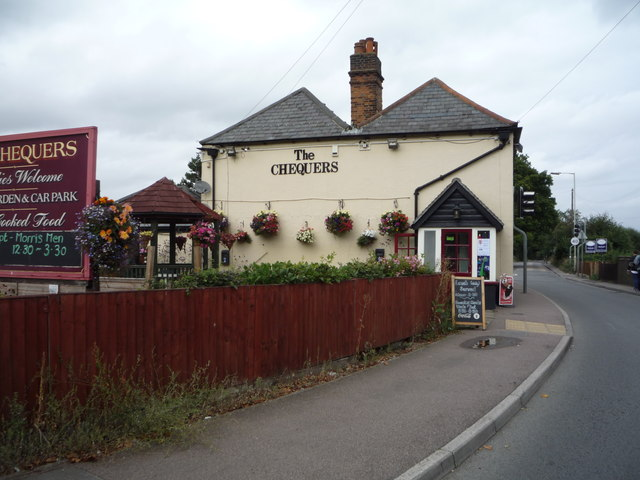
- The Chequers

General information
- Status: Closed
- Town or city: Potters Bar
- Country: United Kingdom
- Coordinates: 51°42′0.742″N 0°9′52.902″W
- Closed: 30 December 2019

The Chequers was a public house which occupied a Grade II listed building in Potters Bar, England. Originally opening in the 1700s, the pub moved site across the road and opened in its current location in the 1840s. Although there is no consensus as to when the current building was originally constructed, (Note: Sources suggest it was built in the 1500s or 1700s) it started as two separate houses which were joined together before the pub moved onto the site.

The building was made Grade II listed in 1985, but the pub shut on 30 December 2019. Before it closed it was the only pub in the British Isles to have traffic lights on site. The pub's namesake is thought to be the chequer tree.

== History ==
=== As an independent pub (before 1815) ===
Originally occupying the building across the road from its current site, the specific opening date of the pub is unknown. The earliest records of the pub are those showing the Jacques family as the license-holders from around 1770 until 1805, with the pub opening on its current site in the 1840s. The building it currently occupies was never intended to be a pub, and constructed by joining two buildings, which were from either the 1500s or 1700s.

=== As a chain pub (1815–2000) ===
From 1815 the pub passed through the hands of various chains - first the Hatfield Brewery tied estate, and by 1837 was in the hands of Alfred Pryor, then his son Edward in 1876. In 1881 the company was renamed to Pryor Reid when Edward's brother in law, Percy Reid, joined the company. In 1920 the Chequers and its company of the same name was sold to Benskins Brewery, which in 1956, was bought by Ind Coope, which in turn merged into Allied Breweries in 1961. In 1978, as part of a larger trade, the pub was transferred to the now defunct Courage Brewery. The pub was made Grade II listed on 12 August 1985, just before it received a major refurbishment in 1987.

=== Second period as independent and closure (2000–2019) ===
The pub became independent again in 2000 when it was taken over by Paul and Gill Englefield. On 30 December 2019, the pub closed, but the owners said it may reopen. However there were concerns from residents regarding the pub's future. In 2020, Hertsmere Borough Council received a planning application for ten apartments on the site. In response "save our pub" was graffitied onto the building. Before it closed, it was the only public house in the UK to have traffic lights on its site, with a set in the car park.
