= Cider in the United Kingdom =

Cider in the United Kingdom is widely available at pubs, off licences, and shops. It has been made in regions of the country where cider apples were grown since Roman times; in those regions it is intertwined with local culture, particularly in the West Country.

The UK is the largest producer of cider in Europe and has enjoyed a renaissance in the 21st century, with a greater diversity of producers, brands and consumers than ever before.

== History ==
Since the early Roman era, dessert and cider apples had been spreading out of the Mediterranean and naturally would have eventually been brought to Gaul, a province of the Roman Empire after the defeat of Vercingetorix in 46 BC by Caesar, and Franconia, parts of which would have formed Magna Germania.

Much later the northern part of Gaul, heavily populated by a mix of Gauls, Romans, and other Celts, became Normandy and the domain of the lords that grew apples on their fiefdoms. The Normans were most certainly a vector for the arrival of continental apples to England—the word cider derives etymologically from the 12th-century French word cidre—but older accounts tell a different story.

Saxon chronicles before their conquest of the Britons mention cider-like drinks and also mention the production of a drink called æppelwīn, an ancient cognate of the Modern German ’apfelwein’’, both literally meaning a wine or alcohol made from apples. Though it is unknown if there is any relation between the ancient drink and the modern German product, at least one account indicates the drink was a luxury item that only the wealthy could afford. There is also evidence from the mid-late Anglo-Saxon period of the growth of orchards before, during, and after Christianisation of this group and their ceremonial use, most famously the custom of Wassail at Yuletide, and it is known that monks grew apples in their gardens.

There is also more recent evidence that indicates that the Romans were growing apples and pears in their stay in Britain, and one of the Vindolanda tablets indicates that the largely Asturian-derived guardsmen near Hadrian's Wall, men with an apple and cider culture predating their own conquest by Rome, were seeking the best apples that could be found locally.

One scholar, Professor Christine Fell, posits that a drink served was an apple-based alcohol using honey as a sweetener and extra fermentation agent and served in small cups that are often found in Saxon burials with the dead.

A journalist and beer scholar, Martyn Comell, notes that with the rise of the word cider in the 12th century, the use of beór as a word disappears entirely from use as well. No form of the word was ever in use again before the 1500s, where beer was renamed following its import from German, bier, and thereafter the word began to describe a grain-based alcohol of barley or wheat, sometimes brewed with hops and malt.

Further final evidence from an archaeological dig in Gloucester in 2002 suggests that crab apples, in addition to their traditional use as a foodstuff, were also being pressed into an alcohol sweetened with honey. With the invasion of 1066 the natural sugar in the Norman apples slowly displaced the need for honey as a sweetening agent and so began the love affair between the English and their apples and cider. Increased planting of apple trees began in earnest as soon as the feudal system introduced by William of Normandy could be secured, and continued down over what is becoming close to a thousand years.

One of the earliest mentions of a named apple cultivar in English comes from the Plantagenet era near the end of the 12th century, ”Costard”. This apple was an all-purpose apple that was occasionally used in cider and remained wildly popular until at least the 19th century: as an illustration, a slang term for the head or brain in the works of Shakespeare is ”costard”, a word a man who spent his life traveling back and forth between his wife in Warwickshire and the theatre in London would have known very well; indeed Shakespeare named one of his clowns after the product in the case of Love's Labour's Lost.

In Renaissance England, a ”costermonger” was a seller of apples or wares and remained so right up until the 1960s, long after the apple it was named for became extinct. With the introduction of hops in the earlier reign of Henry VIII, the production of cider declined a bit but through the efforts of His Majesty's fruiterer new plantings of French varieties began in what is now Kent, setting the stage for more cross pollination with varieties already present and the expansion over the reign of Henry's children and great nephew into Herefordshire, Gloucestershire, and eastern Wales.

Not all of the apples in the UK have ever been grown solely for dessert purposes, and indeed in British cookery the distinction between cider apples, cooking apples, and dessert apples has remained intact since before the Tudors and spread wherever the British colonized, with some blurring of lines in North America due to necessity and scarcity.

== Early publications on the subject of cider making ==
=== Vinetum Brittanicum: A Treatise of Cider ===
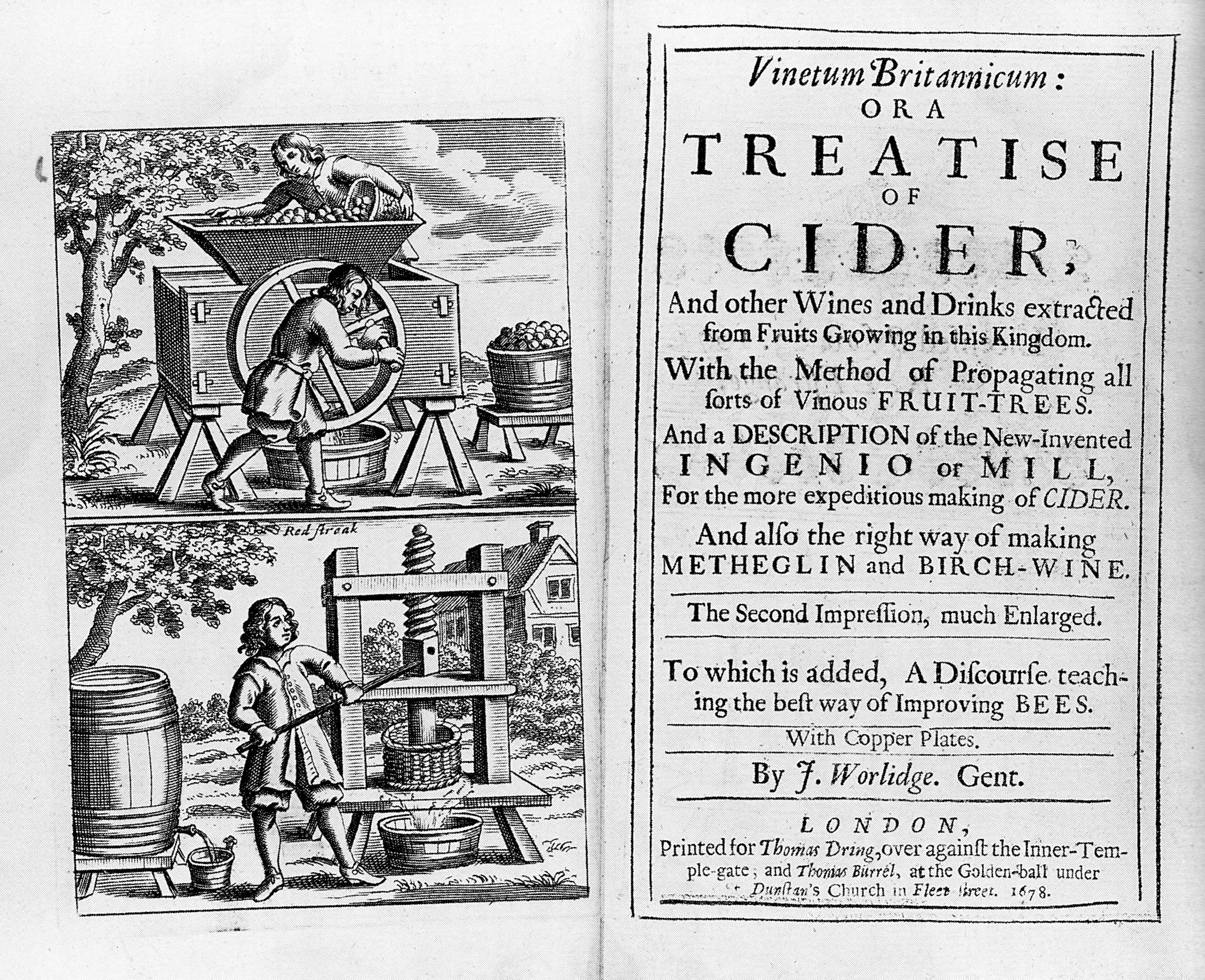
Title page of second edition of Vinetum Britannicum, 1678

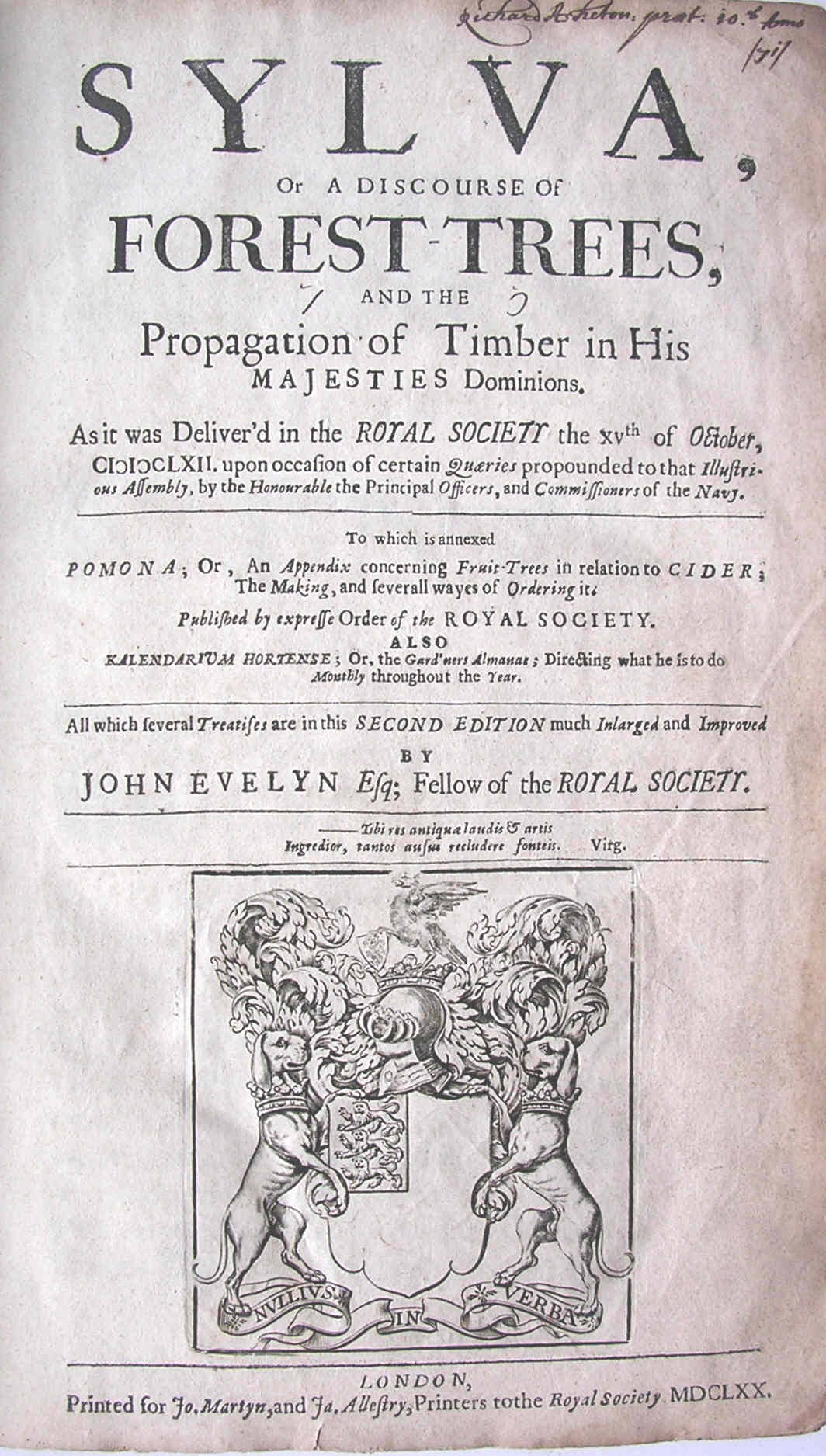
Title page of second edition of Sylva. In 1702, the "Pomona" appendix was added.

In 1676, John Worlidge wrote his Vinetum Brittanicum, a treatise on the production and processing of apples that gives great insight into how little the method has changed in 340 years. Worlidge was writing at a time in which some of the earliest written intact horticulture tracts were being produced in Britain, alongside cookbooks. Both advocate for proper storage of the apples, told which were the correct ones to use for cooking and for drinking, and in the case of Worlidge, advocated the new technique of fermentation in bottles, something that had come into vogue in the 1630s when glass was first strengthened with coke.

=== Sylva, or A Discourse of Forest-Trees and the Propagation of Timber ===
In 1702 an appendix was added to John Evelyn's previous publication of 1664, Sylva. This newly added appendix was named "Pomona: concerning fruit-trees in relation to cider, the making and several ways of ordering it". It is one of the first English cider essays consisting of contributions from several other authors, notably a Dr Beale of Yeovil, as well as Evelyn himself.

== Present day ==
In the present day, the United Kingdom drinks the most cider in the world, if one includes white cider which would not legally qualify as cider in many other countries. It is very common to find cider on tap in pubs and in bottles and cans at the local off-licence and large supermarkets. UK cider is mostly associated with the West Country, the West Midlands, and portions of the Home Counties and East Anglia, more specifically places like Somerset, Devon, Herefordshire, Worcestershire, Kent, Sussex, Suffolk, Norfolk and more recently Buckinghamshire and Cheshire. It is also produced in Wales, Scotland and Northern Ireland. Cider is available in sweet, medium and dry varieties. Recent years have seen a significant increase in cider sales in the UK. The National Association of Cider Makers (NACM) estimates a minimum of 480 active cider makers in the UK. As of 2008, UK cider production comprised 61.9% of cider produced in the EU, and a 7.9% share of UK alcohol servings. There has equally been a marked increase in demand for cider amongst the young: Since 2001, UK supermarket Tesco has increased its cider range by 60%, tripling its premium cider category to keep up with demand.

== Overview ==
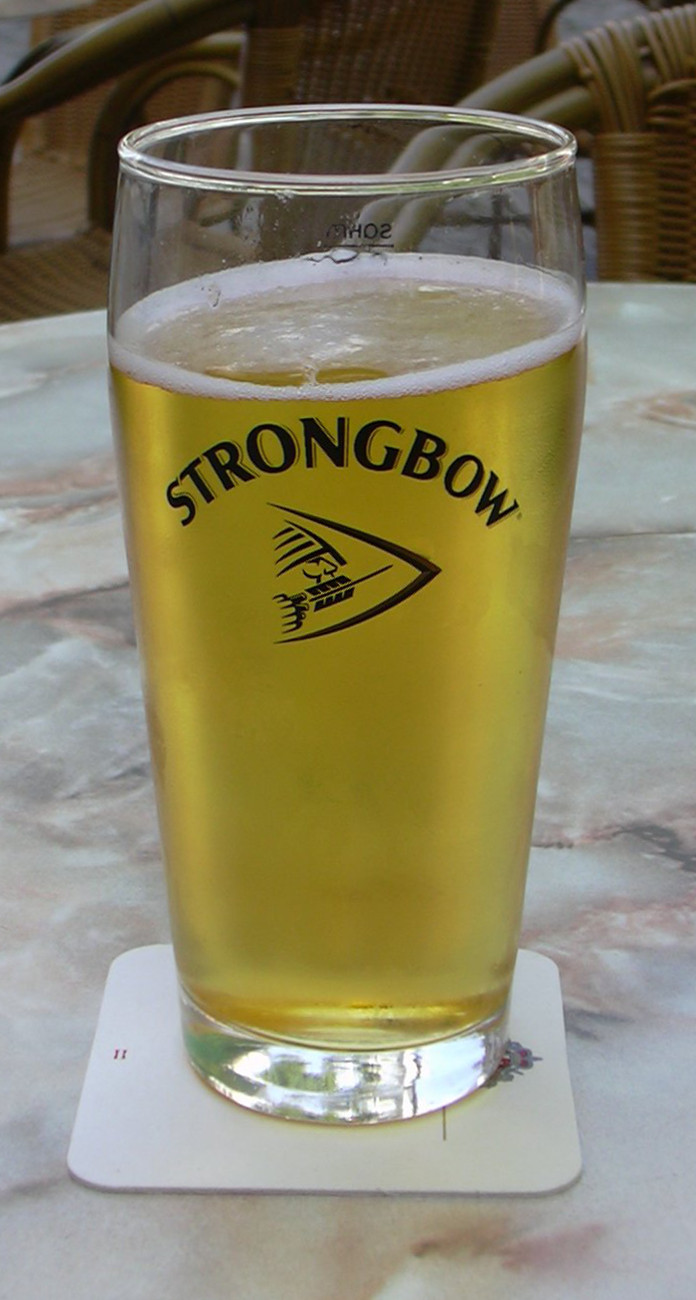
A pint glass of Strongbow cider

There are two broad main traditions in cider production in the UK: the West Country tradition and the eastern Kent and East Anglia tradition. The former are made using a much higher percentage of true cider apples and so are richer in tannins and sharper in flavour. Kent and East Anglia ciders tend to use a higher percentage of, or are exclusively made from, culinary and dessert fruit; Kentish ciders such as Biddenden's, Rough Old Wife and Theobolds are typical of this style. They tend to be clearer, more vinous and lighter in body and flavour.

At one end of the scale are the traditional, small farm-produced varieties. These are non-carbonated and usually cloudy orange in appearance. Britain's West Country contains many of these farms which have an abundance of ancient varieties of specialist cider-apples. Production is often on such a small scale, the product being sold only at the site of manufacture or in local pubs and shops. At the other end of the scale are the factories mass-producing brands such as Strongbow and Blackthorn.

Mass-produced cider, such as that produced by Bulmers, is likely to be pasteurised and force-carbonated. The colour is likely to be golden yellow with a clear appearance from the filtration. White ciders are almost colourless in appearance.

== Consumption ==
Consumption of cider in the UK per pints per head from 1952 to 1991
Year	Consumption
1952	4.5
1957	4.1
1962	3.6
1967	4.8
1972	6
1977	8.2
1982	10.7
1987	11.2
1992	13.2

== Commercial cider ==
=== White cider ===
White cider is made from pomace, the dry apple pulp left over after juicing, and the final product is almost colourless. Some manufacturers make white cider from imported apple concentrate mixed with glucose or corn syrup.

A key market segment exists in the UK for strong mass-produced cider at 7.5% alcohol by volume. Cider with higher than 7.5% alcohol has a higher rate of excise duty. This makes white cider at the lower duty level the cheapest form of commonly available alcohol in the UK, both to buy and to produce. The drink was first produced in the 1980s, and typical brands include White Lightning, Diamond White, Frosty Jack, 3 Hammers and White Strike. By volume of alcohol, the excise duty on cider is lower than any other drink. The duty, as of 2011, was £35.87 per 100 litres of cider of up to 7.5% alcohol. 100 litres of table wine or alcopops would attract £241.23 of duty, wine under 5.5% was charged £102.21, £139.28 for 100 litres of 7.5% beer, and £191.40 for the equivalent alcohol volume of spirits.

Before 1996, brands could be labelled at up to 8.4% alcohol when they actually contained 7.4%. This happened because the duty was levied on the actual strength of the alcohol, but Trade Descriptions legislation allowed the label to overstate the alcohol content by up to 1%. After 1996, White Lightning was then sold in both 7.4% and 8.4% strengths, due to uncertainty about whether consumers would prefer the pricier, stronger drink, or the original and still cheap one, which was thought incorrectly to have been reduced in strength.

Until 2005, the market-leading White Lightning brand was being sold on an almost continual 50% extra free promotion, giving 3 litres of 7.5% cider for a typical selling price of £2.99. Scottish Courage, which owned the brand, decided that year to restrict bottle size to 2 litres as part of its responsible drinking strategy. A spokesman for the company spoke of white cider in general, "It is the cheapest way to buy alcohol in the UK. This is pocket money these days. There is no other alcohol category that has the same challenge as white cider. One three litre plastic bottle of white cider contains twice full recommended weekly alcohol intake for a male or female drinker" (225 mL, 22.5 units, of pure alcohol content compared with the recommended maximum of 14 units). This led to a 70% drop in sales of White Lightning, but increased sales of the brand owner's weaker, more profitable brands. Other manufacturers followed by increasing prices and scrapping their 3-litre bottles.

The price increases on 7.5% cider has increased sales of 5% mass-market cider, which is still widely available in 3-litre bottles in supermarkets.

Since September 2010, HM Revenue and Customs has decreed that, to be called cider, a drink must contain at least 35% apple or pear juice and must have a pre-fermentation gravity of at least 1033 degrees. The legislation was introduced to stop cheap, high-alcohol-content drinks being called cider, thus taking advantage of the lower duty rates applied to cider.

=== "Real" cider ===
The Campaign for Real Ale (CAMRA) defines "real" cider as a product containing at least 90% fresh apple juice, with no added flavourings or colourings. Their definition prohibits the use of apple and pear concentrates, and prohibits substantial chaptalisation of the juice (adding sugar prior to fermentation) except in years when the level of natural sugar in the fruit is low. They allow the addition of sweetener for taste after fermentation, and allow limited dilution after fermentation. CAMRA states that the practice of adding a substantial amount of sugar at the fermentation stage to produce a high-alcohol (12–14% abv) beverage that is then diluted with water down to 8.5% abv or less does not conform to their definition of real cider. Some traditional cider enthusiasts consider this requirement is insufficiently strict and prefer ciders made wholly from apple juice, using apple peel as the source of yeasts.

More leniently, UK law defines cider as containing at least 35% apple or pear juice, which may be from concentrate. The gap between the legal minimum juice content and the traditional method (nearly 100% juice) has led to traditional cider enthusiasts refusing to acknowledge many mass-produced drinks bearing the name "cider" as being so at all. Enthusiasts have similarly been critical of manufacturers labelling perry as "pear cider".

== By region ==
=== West of England and West Midlands ===
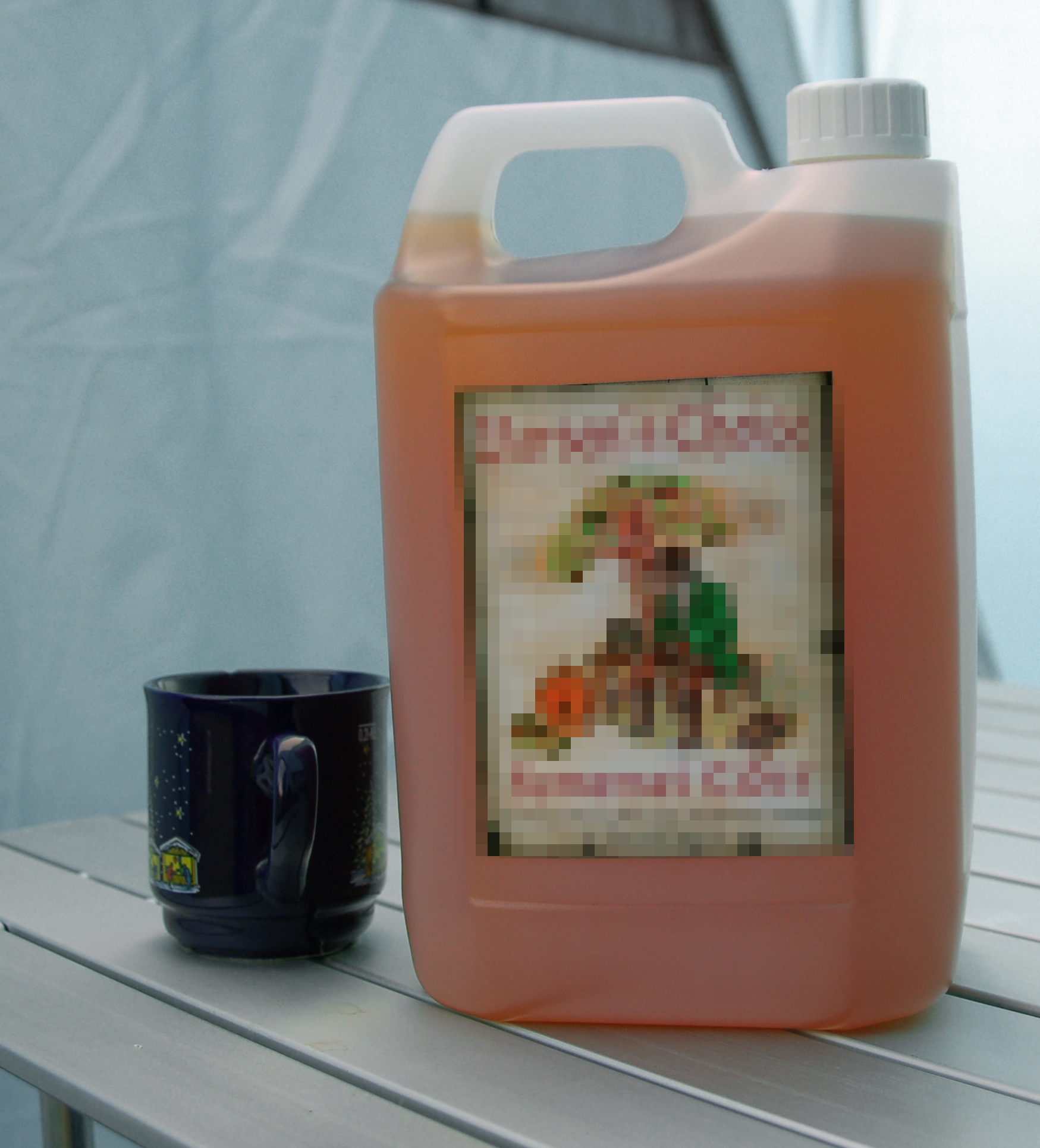
Scrumpy from Somerset

Cloudy, unfiltered ciders made in the West Country are often called "scrumpy", from "scrump", a local dialect term for a small or withered apple. Ciders from Gloucestershire, Herefordshire and Worcestershire made from traditional recipes have a Protected Geographical Indication (PGI) awarded by the European Union in 1996. There are over 25 cider producers in Somerset alone, many of them small family businesses. Historically, farm labourers in Devon, Wiltshire, Dorset, Cornwall and Somerset would receive part of their pay in the form of a substantial daily allowance of cider and local traditions such as the Wassail recall the earlier significance of cider-apple.

Large producers in the West of England and West Midlands include Thatchers Cider in Sandford, Somerset, Bulmers (the producer of Strongbow) in Hereford, as well as Brothers Cider and Gaymer Cider Company, both based in Shepton Mallet, Somerset. There is also Weston's Cider in Much Marcle, Herefordshire. Hogans Cider in Alcester, Warwickshire produces cider from apples from Gloucestershire, Herefordshire & Worcestershire. Healey's Cornish Cyder Farm produces Rattlers branded cider in Truro, Cornwall. As of 2018 there were at least 11 other commercial cider producers in Cornwall. There are still many cider producers in Devon. The number of cider producers in Dorset is rising.

During the 17th and 18th centuries, a condition known as Devon colic, a form of lead poisoning, was associated with the consumption of cider, vanishing after a campaign to remove lead components from cider presses in the early 19th century. The lead poisoning was also prevalent in Herefordshire as lead salts were added to the cider as a sweetener, being much cheaper than sugar.

=== Wales ===
Cider is seidr in Welsh.

Smallhold production of cider made on farms as a beverage for labourers died out in Wales during the 20th century. Cider and perry production experienced a significant increase in the early 2000s, with a number of small firms commencing production across Wales. The Campaign for Real Ale (CAMRA) has actively encouraged this trend, and Welsh ciders and perries have won many awards at CAMRA festivals; meanwhile, the establishment of groups such as UKCider and the Welsh Perry & Cider Society have spurred communication among producers.

Welsh varieties of apples and pears are often distinct from those grown in England, giving cider from Wales a unique flavour profile different from ciders from nearby regions. As such, Traditional Welsh Cider was submitted for Protected Designation of Origin (PDO) status in 2014.

=== Channel Islands ===
The Channel Islands once had a strong cider-making tradition likely largely due to the cultural and linguistic ties it had with the Normandy region of France. Cider had been produced in the area since the Middle Ages, but production increased dramatically in the 16th century when commercial opportunities offered by cider exports spurred the transformation of feudal open-field agriculture to enclosure. By 1673, apple growing became so popular that the States of Jersey had to introduce legislation to keep farmers from growing them: the King forbade the Channel Islands from planting any more unless they had an orchard already extant because he was losing money on the tithes he normally collected. Late 18th and early 19th century accounts suggest the island of Jersey was breeding its own indigenous apples for cider making, apples with names like Noir Binet, Petit Jean, Limon, Pepin Jacob, Carré, Bretagne and de France and the islands's proximity to Brittany and Normandy encouraged the migration of seasonal workers just to pick them all, and cider was often part of their payment.

Until the 19th century, it was the largest agricultural export with up to a quarter of the agricultural land given over to orchards. In 1839, for example, 268,199 imperial gallons (1,219,260 L) of cider were exported from Jersey to England alone, and almost 500,000 imperial gallons (2,300,000 L) were exported from Guernsey 1834–1843, but by 1870 exports from Jersey had slumped to 4,632 imperial gallons (21,060 L).

Beer had replaced cider as a fashionable drink in the main export markets, and even the home markets had switched to beer as the population became more urban. Potatoes overtook cider as the most important crop in Jersey in the 1840s, and in Guernsey glasshouse tomato production grew in importance. Small-scale cider production on farms for domestic consumption, particularly by seasonal workers from Brittany and mainland Normandy, was maintained, but by the mid-20th century production dwindled until only 8 farms were producing cider for their own consumption in 1983.

The number of orchards had been reduced to such a level that the destruction of trees in the Storm of 1987 demonstrated how close the Islands had come to losing many of its traditional cider apple varieties. A concerted effort was made to identify and preserve surviving varieties and new orchards were planted. As part of diversification, farmers have moved into commercial cider production, and the cider tradition is celebrated and marketed as a heritage experience. In Jersey, a strong (above 7%) variety is currently sold in shops and a bouché style is also marketed.

In Guernsey the only commercial producer of cider is The Rocquette Cider Co. which produces a wide range of ciders and is beginning to compete on an international stage.

In Jersey, cider is used in the preparation of black butter (Jèrriais: nièr beurre), a traditional preserve.

=== Scotland ===
Cider is made in Scotland mainly by small producers, such as Nøvar Cider, Thistly Cross Cider, Steilhead Cider, Caledonian Cider Co. and Seidear. The apples are sourced in Scotland, and the resultant ciders are mainly sold near to the place of origin. Thistly Cross Cider produce many fruit flavoured ciders which are now being sold in Scottish Waitrose and Peckham's stores. Steilhead Cider is made with apples collected from within Dumfries and Galloway, and is mainly sold at farmers markets and festivals. Seidear is made from Scottish walled garden apples using the Champagne method. Other Scottish cideries are Cairn O’Mohr and Scruffy Dog Cider in Perthshire, in the Highlands there's Nøvar Cider and Caledonian Cider Co., in Fife there is Naughton Cider, Fleming's Fife Cider, Linn Cider and Aipple.

== See also ==
- Cider
- Perry – Alcoholic beverage made from pears
- Cider in Ireland

== Sources ==
- Product Specification: Gloucestershire Cider (PDF). Department for Environment, Food and Rural Affairs. 2007.
- Product Specification: Gloucestershire Perry (PDF). Department for Environment, Food and Rural Affairs. 2007.
- Product Specification: Herefordshire Cider (PDF). Department for Environment, Food and Rural Affairs. 2007.
- Product Specification: Herefordshire Perry (PDF). Department for Environment, Food and Rural Affairs. 2007.
- Product Specification: Worcestershire Cider (PDF). Department for Environment, Food and Rural Affairs. 2007.
- Product Specification: Worcestershire Perry (PDF). Department for Environment, Food and Rural Affairs. 2007.
