= Benskins Brewery =

Former brewery in Watford, England

Benskins
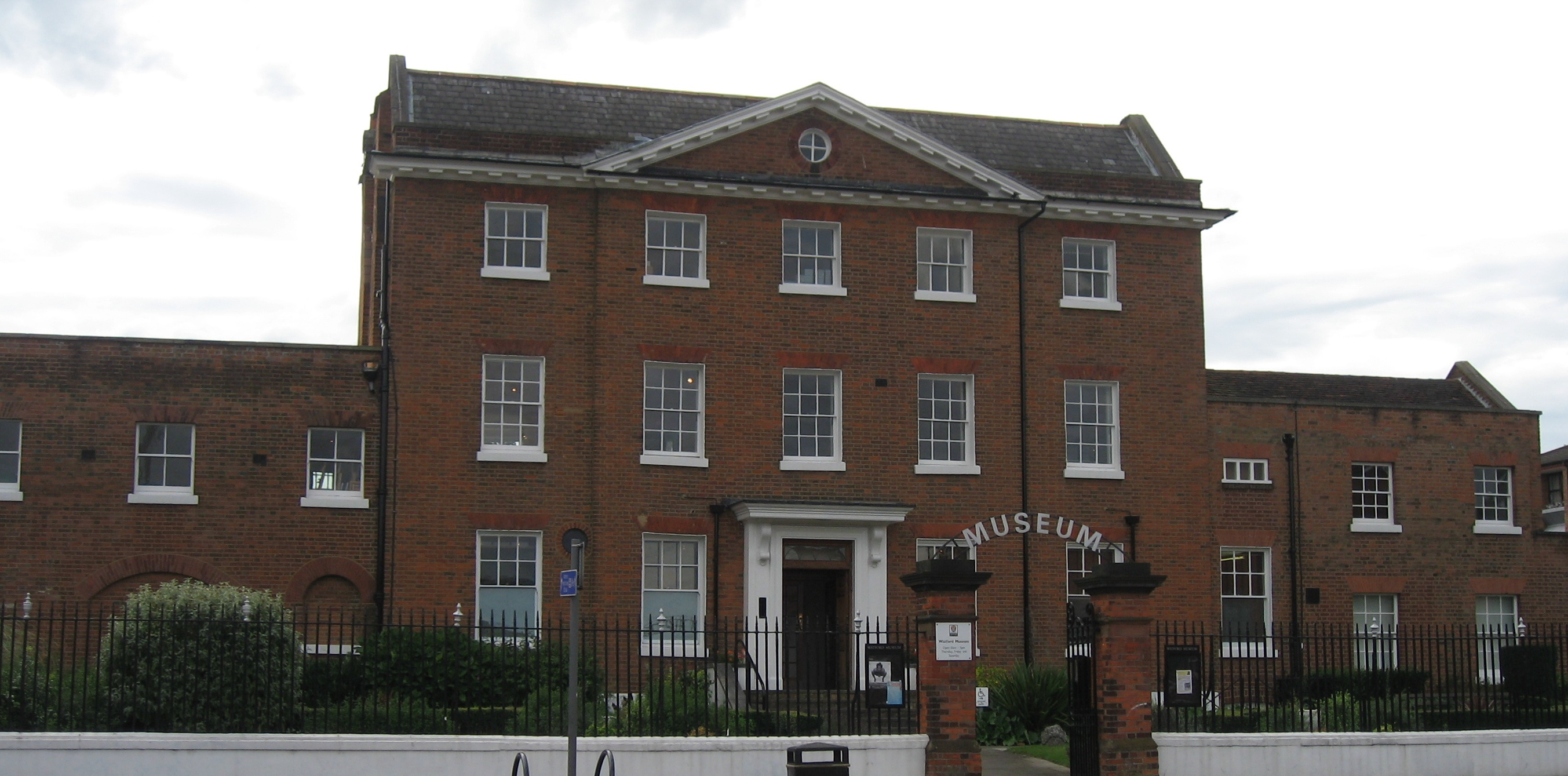
- Industry: Alcoholic beverage
- Founded: 1693
- Defunct: 1957
- Headquarters: 194 High Street, Watford, Herts; WD17 2DT
- Products: Beer
- Owner: Carlsberg International AS

Benskins was the pre-eminent brewery in Watford, and Hertfordshire's biggest brewer until its acquisition by Ind Coope in 1957.

While Benskins has not existed as an independent company for over half a century, the brand continues to be well known in north London and Hertfordshire, through being used as a brand name on many tied houses into the 1990s, and in some cases later.

== History ==
Benskins had its roots in the brewery founded in Watford by John Pope, a local miller and baker around 1693. The brewery was inherited by his second son, Daniel Pope in 1722, and passed to Daniel's sister Sarah Pope and her husband William Dyson in 1741 at his death.

For the next three generations part of the brewery was inherited by a John Dyson (son, grandson, and great-grandson of Sarah Pope and William Dyson) each of whom bought out his co-heirs. When the third John Dyson died in 1867 the brewery was sold at auction to retired London hotelier Joseph Benskin and Watford draper William Bradley for £34,000. Bradley soon left the partnership, and in 1870 Benskin continued alone.

Upon Joseph's death in 1877, the management of the brewery passed to his widow Maria, and their second son John Pusey Benskin. His third son Thomas Benskin became a partner in 1884, bringing to the company James Panton of the Wareham Brewery in Dorset, reputed to be the first person to study scientific brewing at University College, London. Thomas' son Eric Seagrave Benskin later became a director, and Colonel William Briggs, husband of Doris Benskins was appointed to the board in 1908, latterly becoming chairman.

The brewery as taken over by Benskin and Bradley in 1867 was one of the smaller Hertfordshire brewers of the time, with 42 tied houses in its estate. However, over the following ninety years Benskins became predominant in the area, ultimately acquiring all other Watford breweries; Healey's in 1898, Sedgwick's in 1923, and Wells' Watford Brewery in 1951. Healey's had previously, in the months prior to its acquisition, purchased the Victoria Brewery on St Albans Road from the Chesham Brewery. Benskins rose to become the only regional brewer Hertfordshire ever produced, and during its life its estate included pubs, beer houses and off-licences not only in its home county, but as far afield as Sussex, Essex, Suffolk, Cambridgeshire, Bedfordshire, Buckinghamshire, Kent and Greater London.

The brewery remained a family business until a take-over bid was accepted from Ind Coope on 13 March 1957. In 1959, Ind Coope merged with Ansells, and Taylor Walker & Co to form Allied Breweries. At the time of the sale to Ind Coope, the Benskins estate numbered 636 pubs and hotels, and 16 off-licences.

The Benskins name was retained for a number of years after the sale, and brewing continued at Watford until 1972. Despite the closure of the Cannon Brewery site, and its subsequent demolition in 1979, the brand was again revived and applied to a number of pubs in the Allied estate during the early 1980s. A new beer, Benskins Best Bitter, went into production in mid-1980 as part of the relaunch; however, this was brewed in Romford and bore no resemblance to any of the original Watford ales. Benskins continued to trade as a separate business unit, Ind Coope Benskins Limited, although now existing only to manage the tied estate, and maintained its head office in Watford during this time. Occupying the former Clarendon Hotel on Station Road, the hotel's original accommodation repurposed as offices whilst the former stables were converted into a new pub named after Benskins' famous logo – The Pennant (latterly The Flag (and Firkin), currently O'Neill's). Benskins Best Bitter continued to be produced in Burton-upon-Trent until it ceased production in 2002.

As a result of further mergers and acquisitions over the intervening years, ownership of the Benskins trademarks currently rests with Carlsberg International AS, Denmark.

== Acquisitions ==
Chronology of breweries, beer sellers and maltsters acquired by Benskins:

- 1895 – Crown Brewery, Hertford
- 1897 – Groome's Kings Langley Brewery (Kings Langley), Kingsbury Brewery (St Albans)
- 1898 – Healey's King Street Brewery (Watford), Hawkes & Co Brewery (Bishop's Stortford), Down & Needham (Woburn Sands)
- 1913 – Locke & Smith's Brewery (Berkhamsted)
- 1915 – Bailey's Fox Brewery (Bishop's Stortford), Barber's Brewery (Aston Clinton), Taylor's Brewery (Saffron Walden)
- 1920 – Pryor, Reid & Co Brewery (Hatfield)
- 1923 – Sedgwick's (Watford)
- 1927 – Roberts And Wilson's Brewery (Ivinghoe)
- 1929 – Wellers Brewery (Amersham)
- 1951 – Wells' Watford Brewery (Watford)

== Beers ==
Benskins Nut Brown Ale Bottle Label

Beers brewed under the Benskins name, either by Benskins at the Watford Cannon Brewery or by Ind Coope at Burton-upon-Trent or Romford.

Pale Ales: India Pale Ale, Guinea Ale, Pale Ale, Nut Brown Ale, Light Ale, Light Sparkling Ale

Mild Ales: Pale Mild, XX Ale, XXX Ale, XXXX Ale, KK Cask Mild

Bitters: Best Bitter, Jubilee Beer, Watford FC FA Cup Commemorative Ale 1984

Stouts: Brown Stout, Single Stout, Double Stout, Digestive Stout, Imperial Stout, Porter

Barley Wines: Strong Ale, Colne Spring Ale

Uncategorised: Coronation Ale (ER II), Primrose Ale, Bitter Ale

Additionally, Benskins held contracts to bottle a number of products for other producers, including Guinness' Dublin Brewery, and Gaymer's of Attleborough, Norfolk.

As of late 2012, Carlsberg UK were again producing a beer under the Benskins name, a limited availability product known as Benskins Smooth Bitter.

== Legacy ==
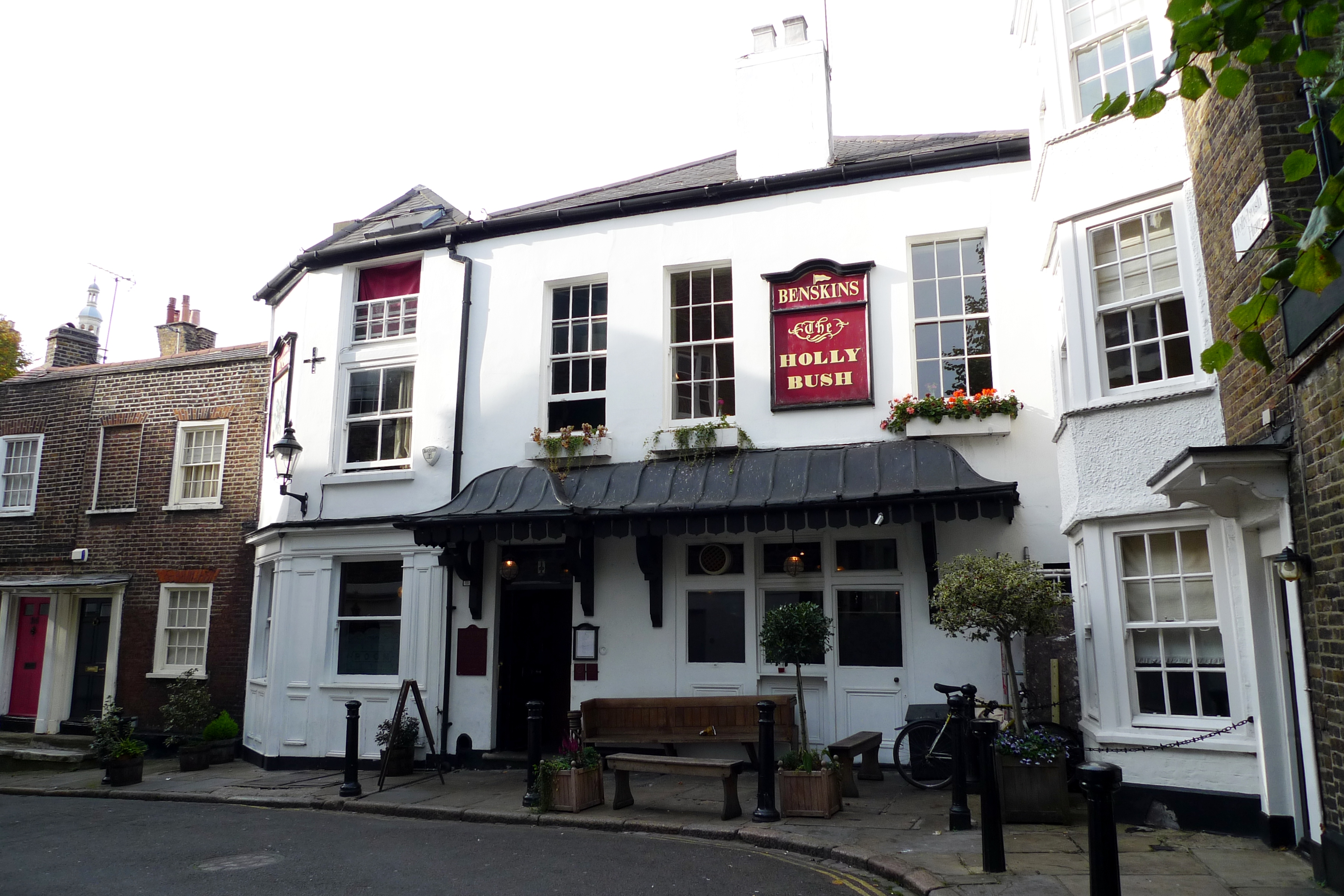
Some pubs in the Hertfordshire and north-west London area carried Benskins branding well into the 2000s. Shown is Benskins branding on the Holly Bush in Hampstead in 2009. It had been removed by 2015.

Benskins had close ties to the local football team, Watford F.C. In 1921, Benskins purchased the current Vicarage Road ground and leased it to the club, at a peppercorn rent. In 2001, the club purchased the ground from Punch Taverns, who had inherited the freehold as part of their acquisition of the Allied Domecq estate.

In 2006, the club also purchased the freehold of the Red Lion pub opposite the ground, which had previously been part of the Benskins tied estate. The pub, notable for its external tiling advertising "Benskins Celebrated Watford Ale & Stout" still extant, re-opened briefly between 2012 and 2014 under new ownership; however, it was sold on again during 2015. In September 2015, the pub was designated an Asset of Community Value by Watford Council.

Pubs in and around the Watford area carried Benskins branding into the 1990s. The Holly Bush pub in Hampstead, London, displayed a number of original brewery artefacts, but was bought by Fuller's in 2010.

The Benskins name lived on for a number of years in the name of English folk dance team Benskins Morris of Watford, although the team have now disbanded.

Before its demolition, the wider brewery site was used as a filming location for the "Heroes" episode of the British TV drama series The Professionals.

The former Brewery House of the Cannon Brewery, built in 1775, is now home to Watford Museum.

During 2010, the main part of the original brewery site was once again redeveloped, after the demise of the Watford Springs swimming pool. During the construction of the Wellspring Centre for Watford Community Church, a 15-metre deep industrial well was discovered, likely to have been the brewery's primary source of water drawn from the River Colne.
