= English rugby league sponsorship =

Corporate sponsorship of domestic league of rugby league in England dates back to the 1980s.

== History ==
The first competition to be sponsored was the Challenge Cup in 1980 when the Rugby Football League (RFL) signed a five-year deal with State Express.

=== Super League ===
The Super League has been sponsored every year apart from 2013 when it was known as Super League 2013 or Super League XVIII.

==== 1986–1997: Slalom Lager and Stones Bitter ====
The RFL Championship became the first domestic competition to be sponsored in 1980, along with the Challenge Cup sponsorship, signing a deal with Slalom Lager becoming known as the Slalom Lager Championship. In 1986, a new sponsorship deal was signed with Stones Bitter changing the league's name once again to the Stones Bitter Championship. This deal ran until 1997 and the league was named Stones Super League in 1996 when the Super League was founded.

==== 1998–1999: JJB Sports ====
JJB Sports signed a two-year deal to sponsor the Super League in 1998. The league became known as the JJB Super League. It was the first Super League season to have a playoff and Grand Final which was also named the JJB Super League Grand Final. JJB also sponsor Wigan Warriors and had the naming rights to their stadium.

==== 2000–2004: Tetley's ====
Tetley's Bitter became the third sponsor of the Super League after they signed a five-year deal in 2000 to become the Tetley's Super League. Like the JJB deal, Tetley's also had the naming rights to the Super League Playoffs and Grand Final. They also sponsored Leeds Rhinos who went on to win the 2004 Grand Final. Tetley's later went on the sponsor the Challenge Cup in 2013 and 2014.

==== 2005–2011: Engage Mutual Assurance ====
In 2005 the Super League signed its longest deal to date with Engage Mutual Assurance, thus becoming the Engage Super League. The deal lasted six years, and included the naming rights to Super League, playoffs and Grand Final. Engage continued their relationship with rugby league in 2012 by sponsoring the referees.

==== 2012: Stobart ====
In 2012 the Super League signed a unique three-year deal with Stobart Group, with the option to opt out after 12 months. The deal included naming rights thus becoming the Stobart Super League. The Stobart logo did not appear on teams kits or anywhere on the pitch including the post cuisines. No cash was invoked in the deal but Super League players and logo was advertised on 100 Stobart lorries across the country. Super League clubs and players criticised the RFL for turning down a cash deal from a betting company and after the 2012 season the RFL activated to opt out clause in the contract, despite TV audiences rising 45% and match day attendance's reaching record highs. The RFL failed to find a sponsor for 2013.

==== 2014–2016: First Utility ====
In 2014 a three-year deal was signed with utility firm First Utility, the First Utility Super League, thought to be worth around £750,000 a year (£2,250,000 in total), which was around the same amount as the Engage deal between 2005 and 2011. The First Utility sponsorship also included a major redesign of the competitions logo.

==== 2017–2019: Betfred ====
Betfred became the first bookmakers to sponsor Super League after a U-turn by the RFL who rejected an offer from Betfair in 2012. The deal is believed to be worth between £850,000 and £900,000 a year with the name becoming the Betfred Super League.

=== The Championships ===
The Championships were formed in 2003 as the National Leagues and renamed the Championships in 2008. Championship 1 (tier 3) was renamed League 1 in 2015.

==== 2003–2008: LHF Healthplan ====
In 2003 the RFL signed a five-year deal with LHF to sponsor the then National Leagues 1 and 2, the second and third division of British rugby league. The divisions became known as the LHF Healthplan National Leagues.

==== 2009–2012: Cooperative ====
After the LHF deal expired the National Leagues were renamed the Championship and Championship 1 together being known as the Rugby League Championships. A deal was then negotiated with the Cooperative Group for the naming rights, Cooperative Championships and newly established playoffs and Grand Final.

==== 2013–2016: Kingstone Press ====
A new deal was negotiated with Cider company Kingstone Press. The RFL negotiated other deal with Kingstone Press including England sponsorship and secondary Super League sponsors along with the NCL deal.

=== National Conference League ===
The National Conference League was founded in 1986 and three more divisions were added to it throughout the 90s and 2000s.

==== 1997–2011: Cooperative ====
The Cooperative Group began its long association with rugby leagues lower divisions with the NCL in 1997, signing an 11-year deal for the title sponsorship. The Co-op later sponsored the Championship and League 1.

==== 2012–2017: Kingstone Press ====
Kingstone Press Cider began their association with rugby league by sponsoring all four divisions of the NCL signing a five-year deal for the naming rights. In 2013 they also sponsored the Championship and League 1 as the Cooperative did during their sponsorship.

==== 2018-2019: Betfred ====
In 2018, Betfred were announced as sponsors of the Championship and League 1 as well as their sponsorship of Super League. They signed a two-year deal.

=== Challenge Cup ===
==== 1980–1985: State Express ====
In 1980 the RFL signed their first sponsorship deal with cigarette brand State Express 555 for the naming rights of the Challenge Cup. It was the first sponsorship deal in rugby league along with the RFL Championship being sponsored by Slalom Larger the same year.

==== 1985–2001: Silk Cut ====
In 1985 Silk Cut became the last cigarette brand to sponsor a major tournament in rugby. It was also the longest sponsorship deal in rugby league, lasting for 16 years.

==== 2002–2003: Kellogg's ====
In 2002 after the long term Silk Cut deal ended, the RFL were quick to find a new title sponsor for their flagship cup competition. They signed a short term two-year deal with Kellogg's for the naming rights, the cup now becoming the Kellogg's Nutri-Grain Challenge Cup.

==== 2004–2007: Powergen ====
In 2004 the RFL signed a new long term 4-year deal with energy supplier Powergen. Powergen were the title sponsor when the final was played at the new Wembley for the first time and Catalans Dragons became the first French, and non English side, to reach a Challenge Cup Final.

==== 2008–2012: Leeds Metropolitan Carnegie ====
In 2008 Leeds Met Carnegie became the title sponsors of the Challenge Cup, signing a five-year deal for the competition to be known as the Carnegie Challenge Cup.

==== 2013–2014: Tetley's ====
Leeds Met Carnegie ended their long association with the Cup in 2012. The RFL were qui to find a new title sponsor and did so with Tetley's Bitter continuing their long-term association with rugby league by signing a two-year deal.

==== 2015–2017: Ladbrokes ====
Ladbrokes became the first betting company to sponsor a rugby league competition after the RFL took a U-turn on betting companies sponsoring major competitions after they turned down a cash deal with Betfair to sponsor the Super League in 2012.

== Sponsors ==
The first British competition to be sponsored was the Challenge Cup in 1980 and was sponsored by State Express and was then known as the State Express Challenge Cup. The Super League has been sponsored every season since 1996 with the exception of the 2013 season.

Year	First Division/ Super League	Championships	National Conference League	Challenge Cup
1980–81	Slalom Lager (Slalom Lager Championship)	Second Division	Did not exist	State Express (State Express Challenge Cup)
1981–82	Slalom Lager (Slalom Lager Championship)	Second Division	Did not exist	State Express (State Express Challenge Cup)
1982–83	Slalom Lager (Slalom Lager Championship)	Second Division	Did not exist	State Express (State Express Challenge Cup)
1983–84	Slalom Lager (Slalom Lager Championship)	Second Division	Did not exist	State Express (State Express Challenge Cup)
1984–85	Slalom Lager (Slalom Lager Championship)	Second Division	Did not exist	State Express (State Express Challenge Cup)
1985–86	Slalom Lager (Slalom Lager Championship)	Second Division	Did not exist	Silk Cut (Silk Cut Challenge Cup)
1986–87	Stones Bitter (1986-1995: Stones Bitter Championship, 1996-1997: Stones Super League)	Second Division	Did not exist	Silk Cut (Silk Cut Challenge Cup)
1987–88	Stones Bitter (1986-1995: Stones Bitter Championship, 1996-1997: Stones Super League)	Second Division	Did not exist	Silk Cut (Silk Cut Challenge Cup)
1988–89	Stones Bitter (1986-1995: Stones Bitter Championship, 1996-1997: Stones Super League)	Second Division	Did not exist	Silk Cut (Silk Cut Challenge Cup)
1989–90	Stones Bitter (1986-1995: Stones Bitter Championship, 1996-1997: Stones Super League)	Second Division	Did not exist	Silk Cut (Silk Cut Challenge Cup)
1990–91	Stones Bitter (1986-1995: Stones Bitter Championship, 1996-1997: Stones Super League)	Second Division	Did not exist	Silk Cut (Silk Cut Challenge Cup)
1991–92	Stones Bitter (1986-1995: Stones Bitter Championship, 1996-1997: Stones Super League)	Second Division/ Third Division	Did not exist	Silk Cut (Silk Cut Challenge Cup)
1992–93	Stones Bitter (1986-1995: Stones Bitter Championship, 1996-1997: Stones Super League)	Second Division/ Third Division	Did not exist	Silk Cut (Silk Cut Challenge Cup)
1993–94	Stones Bitter (1986-1995: Stones Bitter Championship, 1996-1997: Stones Super League)	Second Division/ Third Division	Did not exist	Silk Cut (Silk Cut Challenge Cup)
1994–95	Stones Bitter (1986-1995: Stones Bitter Championship, 1996-1997: Stones Super League)	Second Division/ Third Division	Did not exist	Silk Cut (Silk Cut Challenge Cup)
1995–96	Stones Bitter (1986-1995: Stones Bitter Championship, 1996-1997: Stones Super League)	Second Division/ Third Division	Did not exist	Silk Cut (Silk Cut Challenge Cup)
1996	Stones Bitter (1986-1995: Stones Bitter Championship, 1996-1997: Stones Super League)	Second Division/ Third Division	Did not exist	Silk Cut (Silk Cut Challenge Cup)
1997	Stones Bitter (1986-1995: Stones Bitter Championship, 1996-1997: Stones Super League)	Second Division/ Third Division	Cooperative Group (Co-Op Conference)	Silk Cut (Silk Cut Challenge Cup)
1998	JJB Sports (JJB Super League)	Ford (Northern Ford Premiership)	Cooperative Group (Co-Op Conference)	Silk Cut (Silk Cut Challenge Cup)
1999	JJB Sports (JJB Super League)	Ford (Northern Ford Premiership)	Cooperative Group (Co-Op Conference)	Silk Cut (Silk Cut Challenge Cup)
2000	Tetley's (Tetley's Super League)	Ford (Northern Ford Premiership)	Cooperative Group (Co-Op Conference)	Silk Cut (Silk Cut Challenge Cup)
2001	Tetley's (Tetley's Super League)	Ford (Northern Ford Premiership)	Cooperative Group (Co-Op Conference)	Silk Cut (Silk Cut Challenge Cup)
2002	Tetley's (Tetley's Super League)	Ford (Northern Ford Premiership)	Cooperative Group (Co-Op Conference)	Kelloggs (Kelloggs Challenge Cup)
2003	Tetley's (Tetley's Super League)	LHF Healthplan (LHF National League 1 & National League 2)	Cooperative Group (Co-Op Conference)	Kelloggs (Kelloggs Challenge Cup)
2004	Tetley's (Tetley's Super League)	LHF Healthplan (LHF National League 1 & National League 2)	Cooperative Group (Co-Op Conference)	Powergen (Powergen Challenge Cup)
2005	Engage Mutual Assurance (Engage Super League)	LHF Healthplan (LHF National League 1 & National League 2)	Cooperative Group (Co-Op Conference)	Powergen (Powergen Challenge Cup)
2006	Engage Mutual Assurance (Engage Super League)	LHF Healthplan (LHF National League 1 & National League 2)	Cooperative Group (Co-Op Conference)	Powergen (Powergen Challenge Cup)
2007	Engage Mutual Assurance (Engage Super League)	LHF Healthplan (LHF National League 1 & National League 2)	Cooperative Group (Co-Op Conference)	Powergen (Powergen Challenge Cup)
2008	Engage Mutual Assurance (Engage Super League)	LHF Healthplan (LHF National League 1 & National League 2)	Cooperative Group (Co-Op Conference)	Leeds Met Carnegie (Carnegie Challenge Cup)
2009	Engage Mutual Assurance (Engage Super League)	Cooperative Group (Co-Op Championship & Championship 1)	Cooperative Group (Co-Op Conference)	Leeds Met Carnegie (Carnegie Challenge Cup)
2010	Engage Mutual Assurance (Engage Super League)	Cooperative Group (Co-Op Championship & Championship 1)	Cooperative Group (Co-Op Conference)	Leeds Met Carnegie (Carnegie Challenge Cup)
2011	Engage Mutual Assurance (Engage Super League)	Cooperative Group (Co-Op Championship & Championship 1)	Cooperative Group (Co-Op Conference)	Leeds Met Carnegie (Carnegie Challenge Cup)
2012	Stobart Group (Stobart Super League)	Cooperative Group (Co-Op Championship & Championship 1)	Kingstone Press Cider (Kingstone Press NCL)	Leeds Met Carnegie (Carnegie Challenge Cup)
2013	No Sponsor	Kingstone Press Cider (2013-2014: Kingstone Press Championship & Championship 1, 2015-2017: Kingstone Press Championship & League 1)	Kingstone Press Cider (Kingstone Press NCL)	Tetley's (Tetley's Challenge Cup)
2014	First Utility (First Utility Super League)	Kingstone Press Cider (2013-2014: Kingstone Press Championship & Championship 1, 2015-2017: Kingstone Press Championship & League 1)	Kingstone Press Cider (Kingstone Press NCL)	Tetley's (Tetley's Challenge Cup)
2015	First Utility (First Utility Super League)	Kingstone Press Cider (2013-2014: Kingstone Press Championship & Championship 1, 2015-2017: Kingstone Press Championship & League 1)	Kingstone Press Cider (Kingstone Press NCL)	Ladbrokes (Ladbrokes Challenge Cup)
2016	First Utility (First Utility Super League)	Kingstone Press Cider (2013-2014: Kingstone Press Championship & Championship 1, 2015-2017: Kingstone Press Championship & League 1)	Kingstone Press Cider (Kingstone Press NCL)	Ladbrokes (Ladbrokes Challenge Cup)
2017	Betfred (Betfred Super League)	Kingstone Press Cider (2013-2014: Kingstone Press Championship & Championship 1, 2015-2017: Kingstone Press Championship & League 1)	No Sponsor	Ladbrokes (Ladbrokes Challenge Cup)
2018	Betfred (Betfred Super League)	Betfred (Betfred Championship & League One)	No Sponsor	Ladbrokes (Ladbrokes Challenge Cup)
2019	Betfred (Betfred Super League)	Betfred (Betfred Championship & League One)	No Sponsor	Coral (Coral Challenge Cup)
2020	Betfred (Betfred Super League)	Betfred (Betfred Championship & League One)	No Sponsor	Coral (Coral Challenge Cup)
2021	Betfred (Betfred Super League)	Betfred (Betfred Championship & League One)	No Sponsor	Betfred (Betfred Challenge Cup)
2022	Betfred (Betfred Super League)	Betfred (Betfred Championship & League One)	No Sponsor	Betfred (Betfred Challenge Cup)
2023	Betfred (Betfred Super League)	Betfred (Betfred Championship & League One)	Impact Performance (Impact Performance NCL)	Betfred (Betfred Challenge Cup)
