= Penhallow =

Hamlet in Cornwall, England

Coordinates: 50°19′04″N 5°08′14″W

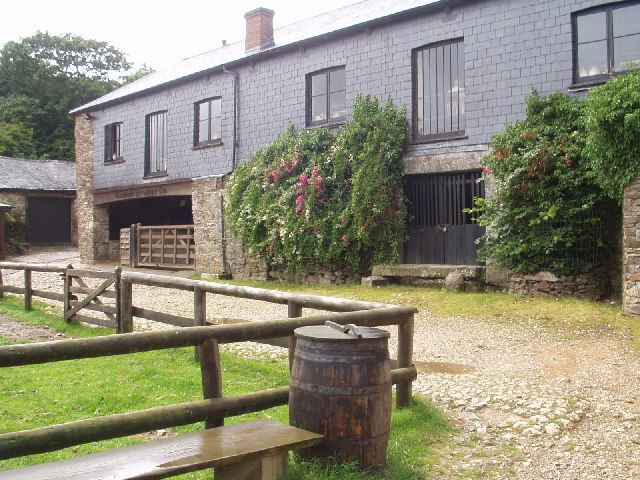
Cornish Cyder Farm, Penhallow

Penhallow is a hamlet near Perranzabuloe in Cornwall, England. Penhallow is on the A3075 main road one km south of Perranzabuloe village.

== Cornish wrestling ==
Penhallow has hosted Cornish wrestling tournaments, for prizes in the 1800s and 1990s.
