= Ansells Brewery =

Regional brewery founded in Aston, Birmingham, England

Ansells Brewery Ltd
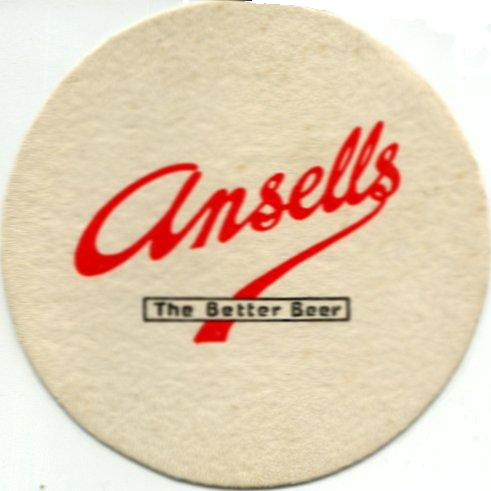
- Industry: Brewing
- Founded: 1858
- Defunct: 1981
- Fate: Became part of Allied Breweries, brewery closed due to strike action in 1981
- Successor: Ind Coope & Company
- Headquarters: Birmingham, England
- Products: Beer

Ansells Brewery was a regional brewery founded in Aston, Birmingham, England in 1858. It merged with Tetley Walker and Ind Coope in 1961 to form Allied Breweries. The brewery remained in operation until 1981, after which production transferred to Allied's Burton upon Trent brewery; some former employees later set up the Aston Manor Brewery.

== History ==
The brewery was founded by Joseph Ansell, a hop merchant and maltster, in 1858 at Aston Cross on the site of several artesian wells (the later HP Sauce factory was adjacent). William Ansell joined his father in partnership in 1867 as did his brother Edward in 1876. From 1877 the company was known as Joseph Ansell and Sons, and became a limited liability company, Joseph Ansell & Sons Ltd, in 1889. In June 1901 it became a registered company called Ansells Brewery Ltd. The company was valued at over £750,000 and included 388 licensed houses.

Ansells grew by acquiring several other smaller local brewers including Rushtons with 100 licensed houses in 1923, Lucas of Leamington with 124 licensed houses (1928) and Holt's Brewery with 250 licensed houses (1934). Holt's logo, a red squirrel seen in side profile, was subsequently adopted by Ansells to identify its own beers.

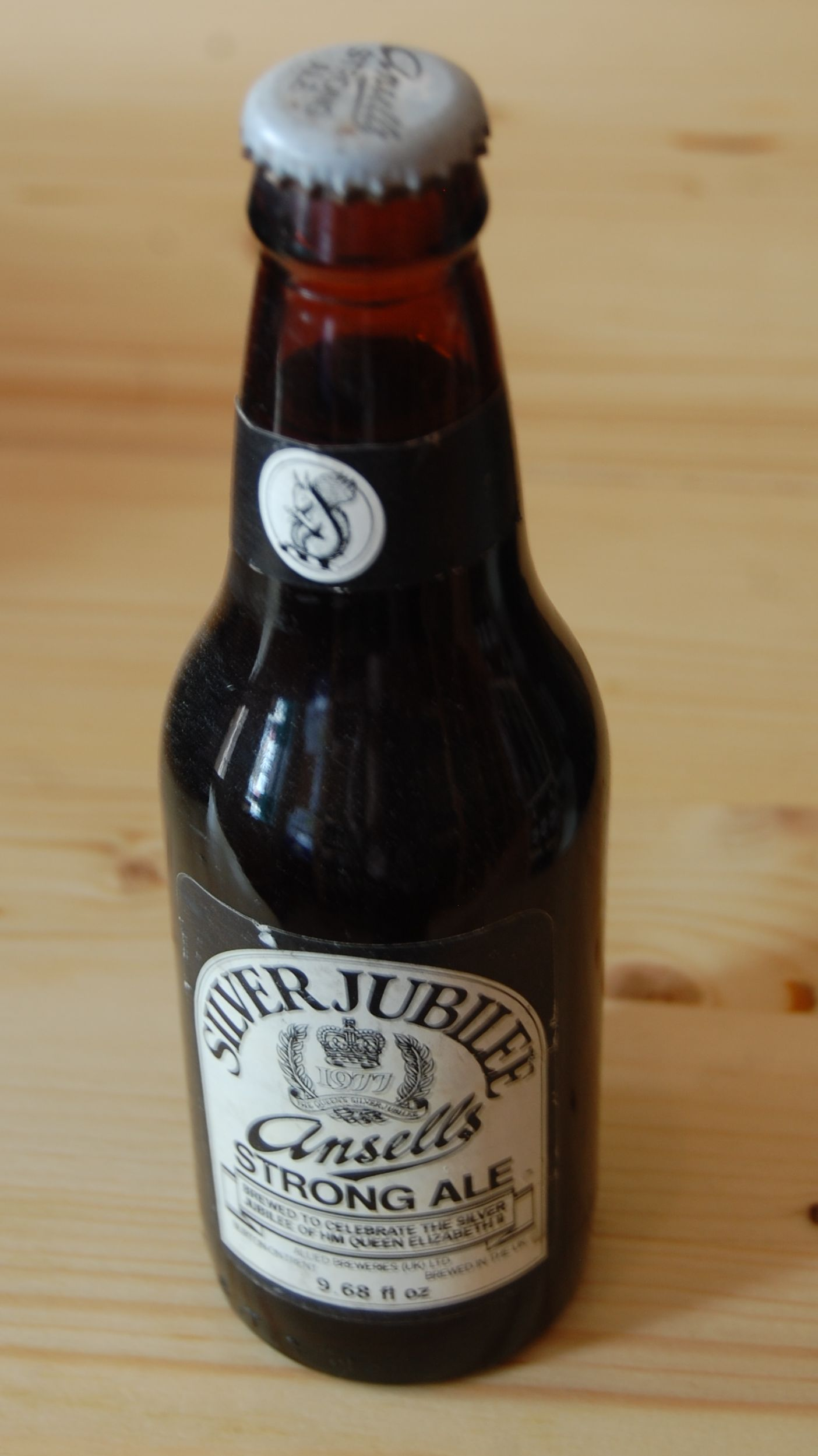
An unopened bottle of Ansells Silver Jubilee Strong Ale, from 1977, commemorating the Silver Jubilee of Elizabeth II

In 1961, Ansells merged with Tetley Walker and Ind, Coope & Co to form Allied Breweries. At the time, Ansells had an estate of 1,088 primarily managed houses in Birmingham and the West Midlands.

Throughout the 1960s and 70s, the brewery was prone to strike action by its workers. By the late 1970s the Aston Brewery was struggling to remain profitable. In 1981, as a cost-saving measure, management attempted to introduce a four-day working week. This resulted in strike action. Allied Breweries subsequently closed the brewery, and 700 jobs were lost, with 300 workers redeployed elsewhere in the company. The brewery was demolished and the site is now occupied by a car showroom. Production was subsequently moved to Allied's Burton upon Trent brewery. Some former staff set up the Aston Manor Brewery.

Ansells Mild and Best Bitter are currently produced for Allied's successor Carlsberg by JW Lees. Cask conditioned Ansell's Mild was discontinued in 2012.

== Advertising ==
Ansells sponsored the Birmingham City football team strip between 1983 and 1985, and the Stoke City kit in the early 1990s

== See also ==
- List of breweries in Birmingham
