= List of breweries in Birmingham =

Birmingham shown within the West Midlands county

This is a list of breweries in Birmingham, West Midlands, England.

== Operational breweries ==
| Name | Area | Opened |
|---|---|---|
| Aston Manor Brewery Company Ltd | Nechells | 1983 |
| Attic Brew Co | Stirchley | 2018 |
| Birmingham Brewing Company | Stirchley | 2016 |
| Brewhouse & Kitchen | Sutton Coldfield | 2015 |
| Burning Soul Brewing Ltd | Jewellery Quarter | 2016 |
| Froth Blowers Brewing Company Ltd | Erdington | 2013 |
| GlassHouse Beer Co | Stirchley | 2016 |
| Halton Turner Brewing Company | Digbeth | 2018 |
| Indian Brewery Company | Great Barr | 2015 |
| Infinity | Maypole | 2020 |
| Leviathan Brewing Ltd | Sutton Coldfield | 2019 |
| Moseley Beer Company Ltd | Moseley | 2015 |
| Ostlers Ales Ltd | Harborne | 2013 |
| Rock & Roll Brewhouse Ltd | Jewellery Quarter | 2013 |
| Sommar Brewing Company | Birmingham City Centre | 2019 |
| The Two Towers Brewery Ltd | Gun Quarter | 2010 |

== Defunct breweries ==
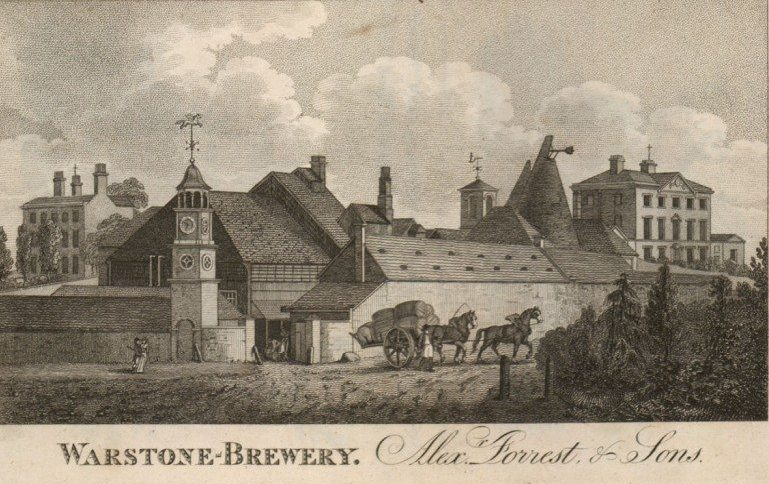
Alex Forrest and Sons' Warstone Brewery, as depicted in 'Bisset's Magnificent Guide' in 1808

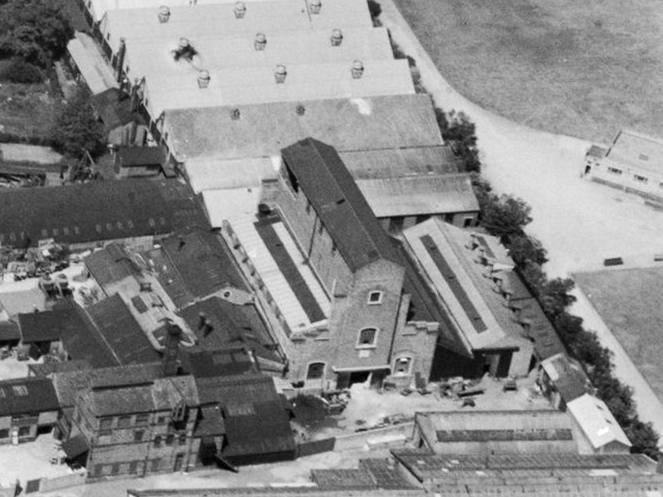
Wellhead Brewery, seen in 1950

| Name | Area | Opened | Closed |
|---|---|---|---|
| ABC (The Pride Of Aston) Ltd | Aston | 2008 | 2012 |
| Ansells Brewery Ltd | Aston | 1857 | 1981 |
| Beer Geek Brewery Limited | Nechells | 2011 | 2013 |
| Birmingham Brewery Ltd | Nechells | 2008 | 2010 |
| The Birmingham Old Brewery | | 1782 | Unknown |
| Davenport's Brewery Ltd | City Centre | 1896 | 1998 |
| Dig Brew Co | Digbeth | 2017 | 2023 |
| Faculty & Firkin | Nechells | 1997 | 1999 |
| Fiddle and Bone Brewing Company | Ladywood | 1999 | Unknown |
| Fieldmouse & Firkin at the Fighting Cocks | Moseley | 1996 | 1999 |
| The Holt Brewery Co Ltd | Nechells | 1872 | 1934 |
| Edmunds Brewhouse | City Centre | 2015 | 2018 |
| Ivybush Brewery | Edgbaston | 1994 | 1998 |
| Mitchells & Butlers Brewery | Cape Hill | 1898 | 2002 |
| Original Brewing Company Birmingham | Rubery | 1998 | 2000 |
| Thousand Trades Brewing Co. | Hall Green | 2016 | 2017 |
| Urban Brewery | Jewellery Quarter | 2009 | 2015 |
| Warstone Brewery | Jewellery Quarter | fl. 1808 | |
| Wellhead Brewery | Perry Barr | fl. 1890 | |
