= Loïc Raison =

Loïc Raison is a cider brand headquartered in Caen, Normandy. It is a subsidiary of Eclor, part of the Agrial Group.

== History ==
In 1923, Louis Raison founded a small cider house in the village of Domagné.

In 1949, the company was taken over by Loïc Raison, the son of Louis Raison.

== Operations ==
The company operates its sole historic site in Domagné, Ille-et-Vilaine.
