= Aston Manor Cider =

Cider maker and bottler in Birmingham, England

Aston Manor Limited
- Trade name: Aston Manor Cider
- Formerly: Aston Manor Brewery Company Limited (1983–2017)
- Industry: Brewing
- Founded: 1981 (45 years ago) in Aston, Birmingham, United Kingdom
- Headquarters: Witton, Birmingham, England, UK
- Products: Cider
- Website: astonmanor.co.uk

Aston Manor Limited, trading as Aston Manor Cider, is a former brewery and current cider maker and bottling company in Aston, Birmingham, England. Having started out as a beer brewery, the company now produces exclusively cider and perry. In 2008 it was the third largest cider company in the UK by market share, and the fourth largest in the world. In August 2018 Aston Manor cider was acquired by French co-operative Agrial.

== Management ==
It was managed by Peter Ellis, son of Doug Ellis, until 2013, when Gordon Johncox took over as managing director. Peter Ellis remained as executive chairman until his death in December 2017. Peter's son, James Ellis, is financial director. Cider production director is Rod Clifford.

== Products ==
Its products include the Frosty Jack's brand of white cider, Kingstone Press Cider, Friels First Press Vintage and Hop Infused Cider Knights Malvern Gold, Crumpton Oaks and 3 Hammers.

In 2017, the business won 29 awards for its products and manufacturing.

== History ==
The company was formed in 1981 by four former employees of Ansells, after Ansells closed its Aston Cross brewery. A new brewery was opened in nearby Thimble Mill Lane. In 1984, Herefordshire hop farmer Michael Hancocks, one of the company's suppliers, bought into the business. By 1998, Aston Manor was reporting profits of over £1million, with 70% of its sales being cider. Because of a slump in the market and strong competition, by 2001 profits had fallen to £740,500, but by 2009 had risen to over £3 million, due to a large rise in demand in the UK. In 2009 the company took over the Devon Cider Company, based in Tiverton, Devon and has expanded the manufacturing facilities on that site.

In spring 2013 the company planted 1,000 acres of new orchards, using 350,000 trees, on sites in Worcestershire and Herefordshire.

In the autumn of 2013, a new fruit processing and pressing facility was added in Stourport-on-Severn in Worcestershire.

In July 2014 the company moved to a new head office and logistics facility adjacent to the M6 motorway at Witton in Birmingham.

In August 2018 Aston Manor cider was acquired by French co-operative Agrial.

== Industrial sabotage plot ==
In 2001, Michael Hancocks, then managing director and a major shareholder with 12% of the shares, and whose family owned 44% of Aston Manor, organized a conspiracy to contaminate the cider products of the company's rival, H. P. Bulmer. He recruited a former Aston Manor employee, chemist Richard Gay, to produce a yeast that he planned to introduce into Bulmer's production line, recruited his daughter's partner, Paul Harris, to transport the contaminant, and paid a Bulmer's employee, Russell Jordan, £16,000 to introduce the contaminant. Jordan did not introduce the contaminant, but reported the plot to Bulmers and to the police, and the plot was foiled. If the plot had succeeded, anyone drinking the contaminated cider would have suffered diarrhoea and nausea. Following his conviction for conspiracy to defraud, Hancocks was jailed for 18 months and dismissed from the board of Aston Manor.

== See also ==
- List of breweries in Birmingham
- List of cider and perry producers in the UK
