= Devon Cider Company =

English alcohol producer

Devon Cider Company was a company founded in 1999 in Devon, England, which produced cider. In 2005 it moved to a former Whitbread brewery in Tiverton, which it purchased from brewer InBev. The company went into voluntary administration in 2007 and was restructured as a group of three companies: Devon Cider, Devon Cider Brands and Devon Commercial Property.

Devon Cider Company went into administration again in 2009 and was taken over by Birmingham-based Aston Manor Brewery, who retained the Tiverton site and in 2011 increased the workforce there.

The company produced cider under brands such as Devon Village, Superior Old Moors, 3 Hammers and Ice White.
