= 3 Hammers =

English white cider brand

3 Hammers (sometimes called Three Hammers) is a strong white cider made in Tiverton, Devon, England by the Aston Manor Brewery. Before 2009 it was made by the Devon Cider Company, until that company went into administration in 2009 and was taken over by Aston Manor. The cider is named after a small village near Tiverton.

The strength and cheapness of this and similar white ciders has made them subject to calls for higher taxation to reduce the potential for abuse. In 2006 a litre of 3 Hammers could be bought for £1.19, cheaper by volume than a bottle of Perrier water at 99p for 75 cl.

== See also ==
- Buckfast Tonic Wine
