= Cornish Cyder Farm =

Cornish drink producer

Coordinates: 50.3117°N 5.133°W

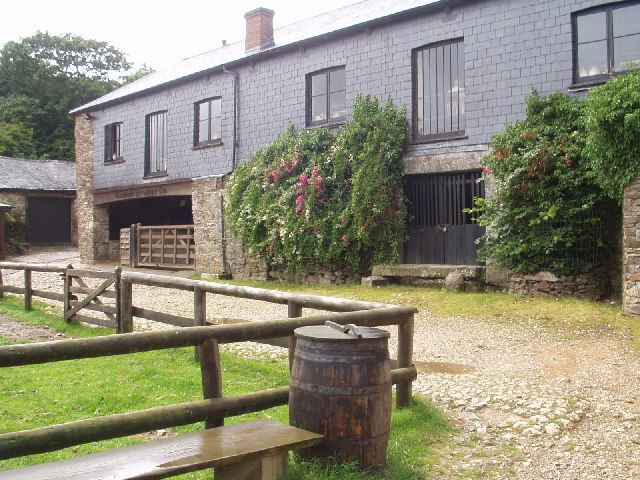
Cornish Cyder Farm, Penhallow

Healey's Cornish Cyder Farm is a small independent family-run business in Penhallow near Truro, Cornwall, England, UK. It produces and sells its own cider, brandy, whisky, gin, eau de vie, country fruit wines and apple juice. Ciders include Cornish Rattler Cyder and Pear Rattler, which is made by adding pear juice to the original Cornish Rattler. In addition, the farm produces traditional scrumpy cider, reserve and classic cider, with the latter made in second hand oak whisky barrels. The farm also produces jams, marmalades, sauces, chutneys, pickle and mustard.

== History of Healeys ==
Healey's was opened to the general public in 1986 by David and Kay Healey, after they had been running an off-licence in Mevagissey. During their time managing an off-licence they realised how popular Cornish Cyder is, they initially began making Cyder for themselves at their smallholding near St Austell. The current site of the Cyder Farm is Penhallow near Truro, Cornwall. The original farm is over 150 years old, and had been a mixed arable and cattle farm.

The whisky was produced in a partnership with St Austell Brewery. It is the first commercial whisky to be produced in Cornwall in 300 years.

== See also ==
- List of farms in Cornwall
- Cider in the United Kingdom
