= Sedgwicks Brewery =

British brewery

Sedgwick's Brewery
- Founded: 1655
- Defunct: 1923
- Headquarters: 223 High Street, Watford, Herts

Sedgwicks was a brewery located in Watford, Hertfordshire, until its sale to local rival Benskins in 1923.

== History ==
Sedgwick's is believed to have its origins in a brewhouse owned by William Smith and located in Watford High Street around 1655. Continuing under family ownership, William Smith's brewery underwent modest expansion until 1790 when it was sold to George Whittingstall.

George Whittingstall instigated more significant expansion of the brewery and tied estate until his death in 1822 when he left the brewery to a cousin, Edmund Fearnley, on condition that he change his name to Edmund Fearnley-Whittingstall.

Expansion again continued, however upon Edmund's death the brewery estate become liable for debts arising from his other business ventures, and so the decision was made to lease the brewery and tied estate to William F. Sedgwick starting from 1862.

The brewery remained in the Sedgwick family, and they expanded by purchasing the Colne Brewery, Uxbridge in 1896, Wild's Brewery, Rickmansworth in 1900, and Speedy's Brewery, Clapham, in 1923. However, later that year the brewery and tied estate was sold to local competitor Benskin's for £597,000.

== Trivia ==
British celebrity chef and television presenter Hugh Fearnley-Whittingstall, owes his name to his ancestor's entry into the brewing industry, himself being a descendant of Edmund Fearnley.
