= Cider in Ireland =

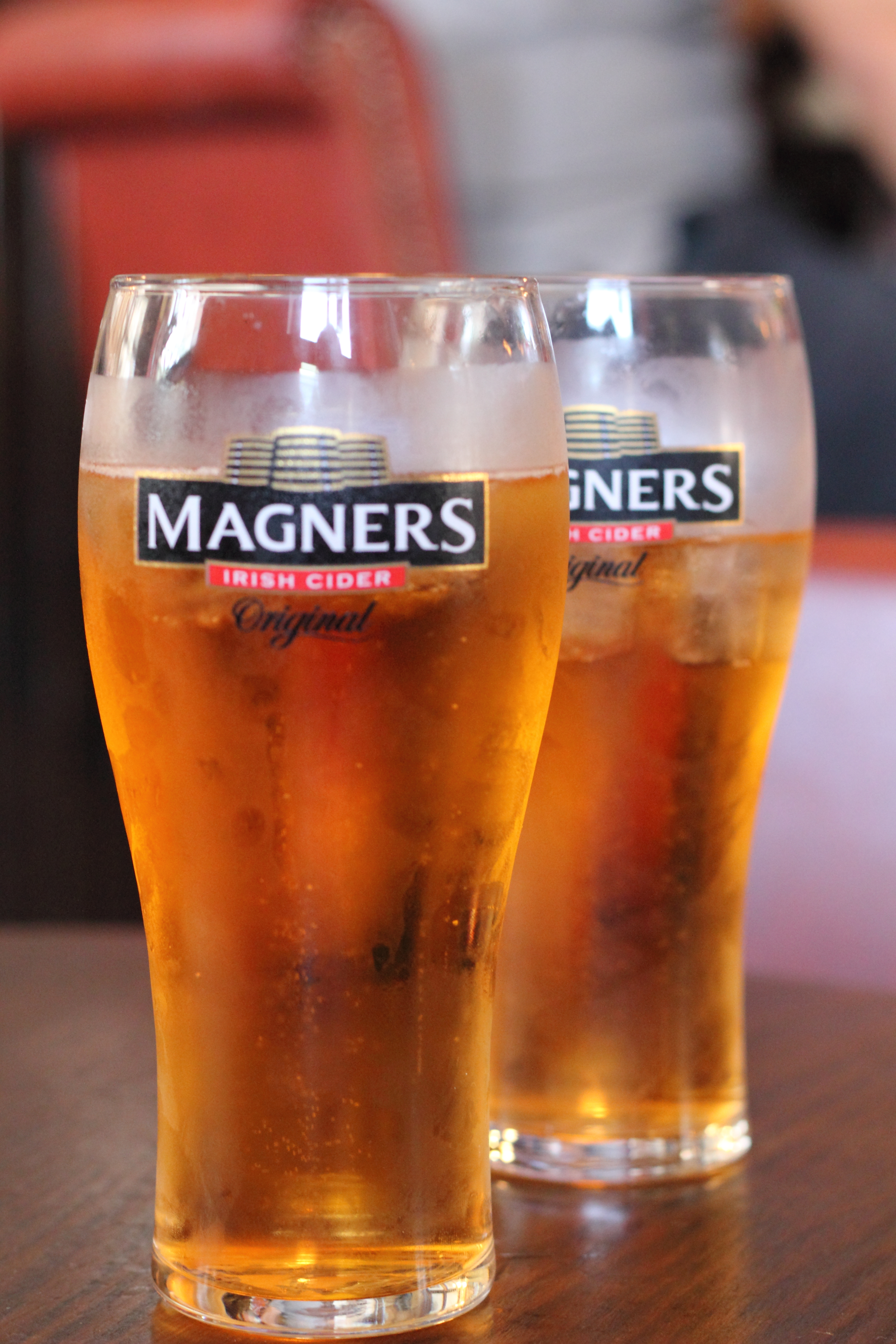
Glasses of Magners cider

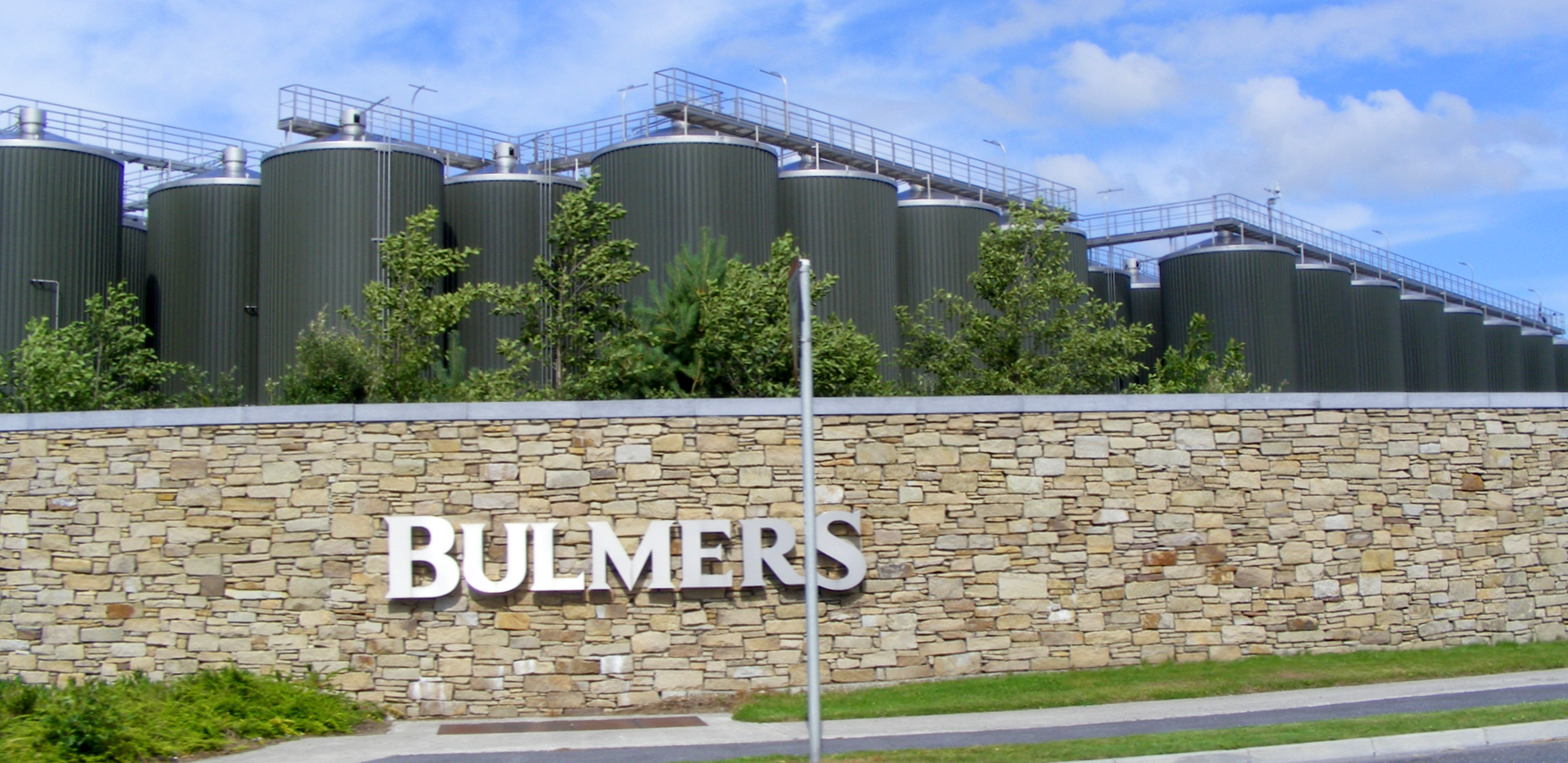
Bulmers factory, Clonmel

Cider, an alcoholic drink made from apples, is widely available in Ireland at pubs, off licences, and supermarkets. It has been made in regions of the island for hundreds of years.

The Irish language term for cider is leann úll (literally "apple beer") or ceirtlís, derived from ceirt, an Old Irish term for an apple tree (cf. the Ogham letter ceirt ᚊ).

== History ==
Apples have been eaten in Ireland since 3000 BC, with pips of Malus sylvestris (European crab apple) found on a site in County Meath.

The law tract Boetha Comaithchesa of the 7th/8th centuries AD distinguish between wild and cultivated apple trees, indicating that apples were being cultivated at the time.

Traditional regions of production were the counties of Armagh, Kilkenny, Tipperary and Waterford; it was made by monks in Ireland's many Christian monasteries. The first definite mention of cider in an Irish text is in a 12th-century document from Ulster; in 1155, a Mac Cana chieftain was praised for the quality of his cider.

Civil Surveys of the 1650s contain numerous entries regarding orchards and cidermaking. Cider production was a major industry from the 16th century onward, with immigration from Huguenots and German Palatines bringing cider-making skills to Ireland.

Richard Pococke toured Ireland in 1752, noting that Affane, County Waterford was famous for its cider, and that Shannon Grove near Pallaskenry had a cider house.

Cider making went into decline at the time of the Great Famine (1845–49). Government efforts produced a revival in the late 19th century, but the industry was hit hard again by the world wars. William Magner opened his brewery in Clonmel in 1935, producing cider on an industrial scale.

Magners rebranded cider for young people in the early 21st century, to some success.

== Present day ==
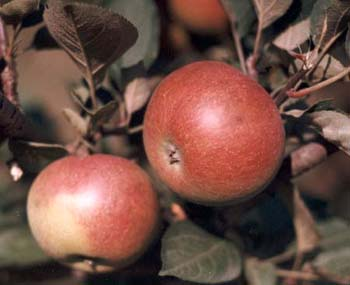
Dabinett apple

Today, cider accounts for 7.5% of alcohol consumed in Ireland; the Republic of Ireland consumes 64 million litres a year (about 13 litres or 23 pints per person), three-quarters of it of Irish origin. Craft cider is increasing in popularity. Cider makers complain that they are held back by high excise duty on ciders stronger than 6% ABV. There are 45 commercial apple growers in Ireland, with 29% of the planting area going into cider. The Dabinett is the most common cultivar.

== See also ==
- Cider in the United Kingdom
