= Kingstone Press Cider =

English cider made from apples

Kingstone Press Cider is an English cider made from apples from an orchard in Malvern in Worcestershire. Kingstone Press is Aston Manor's main cider blend.

There are three different flavours; Kingstone Press Apple, Kingstone Press Pear and Kingstone Press Wild Berry.

== Rugby league sponsorship ==
In early 2013, Kingstone Press became the title sponsor of the semi-professional Championship and Championship 1 and later became official partner of the England national team and official cider of the 2013 Rugby League World Cup. At the end of 2013, Kingstone Press became the main sponsor of the National Conference League, the top amateur competition in the UK. Towards the end of 2014, they extended their sponsorship to include the England national rugby league team and became the official cider partner of the Super League and Tetley's Challenge Cup
