= Agrial =

French food cooperative

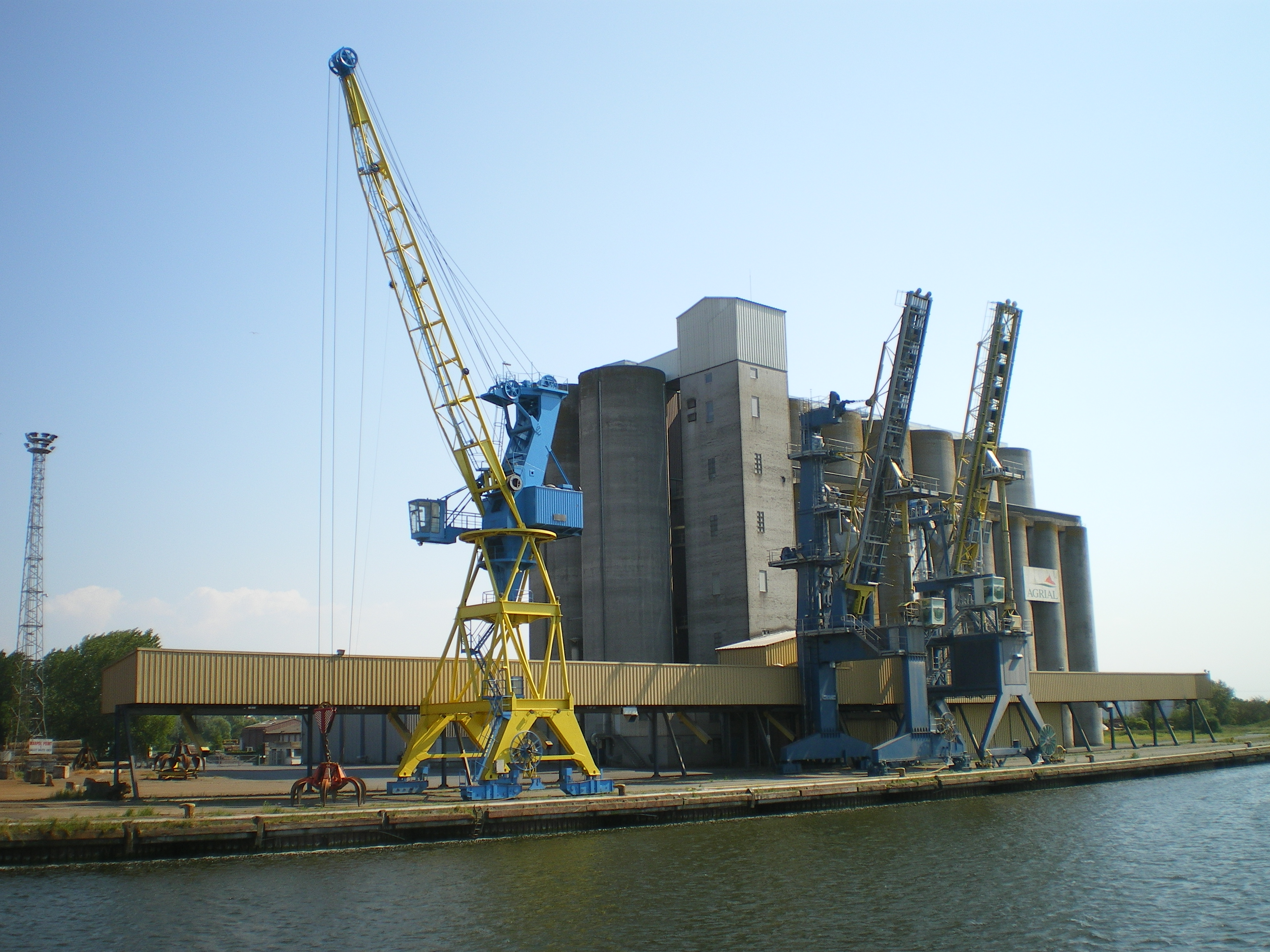
- Grain elevators in port of Caen
- Type: Cooperative corporation
- Industry: Agricultural and food-processing
- Founded: June 21, 2000
- Headquarters: Caen, France
- Key people: Arnaud Degoulet (Chairman), Ludovic Spiers
- Brands: Florette, Loïc Raison
- Revenue: ▲€ 4.2 billion (2014)
- Net income: ▲€ 44 millions (2014)
- Total equity: ▲€ 705 millions (2014)
- Number of employees: 12 000 (2014)
- Website: www.agrial.com/en/

Agrial is a French agricultural cooperative and food-processor with operations in dairy, beef, poultry, vegetables and fruit. The company has a workforce of 12,000.

== History ==
In 2004, Agrial acquired CCLF, a French cider producer.

In 2011, Agrial merged with the dairy cooperative Elle & Vire. The following year, it participated in the creation of Senagral, a joint venture with Senoble, and acquired Manzana Products, a fruit processing company based in the United States.

In 2016, it acquired Fromagerie Guilloteau, a French cheese producer.
