= Allied Breweries =

UK brewery company, 1961–1992

Allied Breweries was the result of a 1961 merger between Ind Coope (of Burton), Ansells (of Birmingham), and Tetley Walker (of Leeds).

In 1978, Allied Breweries merged with the food and catering group J. Lyons and Co to form Allied Lyons. The breweries business merged with Carlsberg in 1992 and became Carlsberg-Tetley, which is now part of Carlsberg Group, with Carlsberg-Tetley now known as Carlsberg UK.

== History ==
=== Ind Coope ===
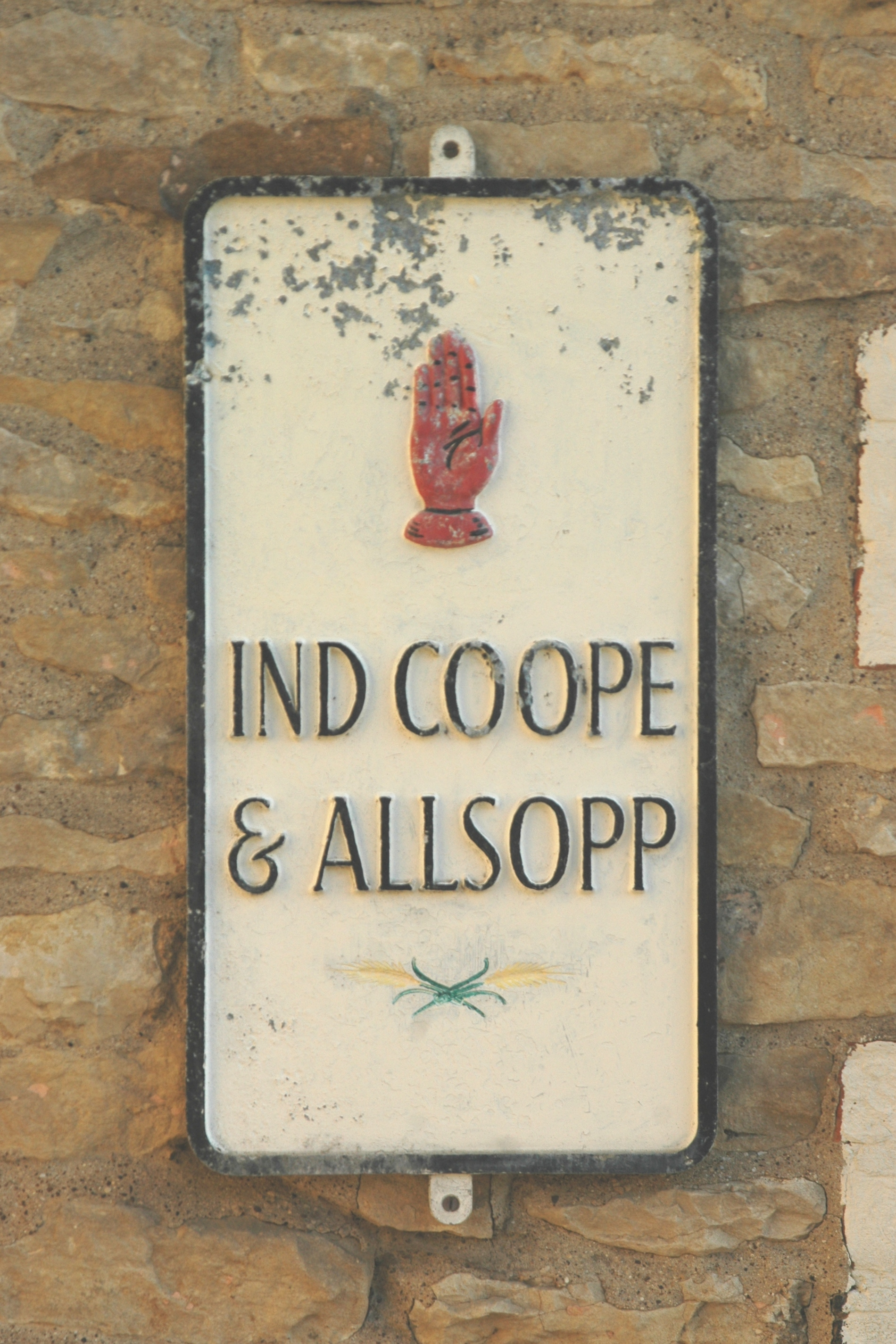
Ind Coope and Allsopps plaque outside The Plough Inn, Great Haseley, Oxfordshire

Edward Ind acquired the Star Brewery in Romford, Essex from George Cardon in 1799.

Ind entered into partnership with Octavius Coope and George Coope in 1845 to form Ind Coope. A brewery was established in Burton-on-Trent in 1856.

Ind Coope merged with Samuel Allsopp & Sons in 1934.

Ind Coope acquired Trouncers Brewery in Shrewsbury in 1954, Benskins Watford Brewery in 1957 and Taylor Walker and Friary Meux in 1959.

=== Allied Breweries ===
Ind Coope merged with Tetley Walker of Leeds and Ansells to form Allied Breweries in 1961.

In 1968, Allied made an agreed £108M bid for Showerings of Shepton Mallet, acquiring William Gaymer, Whiteway's, Britvic and John Harvey & Sons of Bristol.

In 1978, Allied Breweries merged with the food and catering group J. Lyons and Co to form Allied Lyons. The breweries business was merged with Carlsberg in 1992 and became Carlsberg-Tetley, which is now part of Carlsberg Group, with Carlsberg-Tetley now known as Carlsberg UK. Ind Coope Burton Brewery was sold by Carlsberg-Tetley to Bass in 1997. Through a series of take-overs and name changes, it is now owned by Molson Coors and operates as Burton North Brewery.
