= Peckham's =

Scottish food retail chain

- Company type: Private limited company
- Industry: Retail (Grocery)
- Founded: 1982
- Defunct: August 2018
- Headquarters: Glasgow, Scotland, UK

Peckham's is the trading name of a chain of delicatessens and cafes in Scotland. Peckham's advertised itself as a vintners, victuallers and delicatessen company, and also offered luxury hampers & gifts online.

The stores usually contained a delicatessen, cafe and an off-sales area offering wines, spirits, and other drinks. Other grocery and non-food items were also available in the branches.

Founded in 1982 by Tony Johnston, the first store was on Clarence Drive in the West End of Glasgow. The group experienced financial troubles in the 2010s, and the brand was sold, with the last branches being closed in 2018. Johnston opened a new branch in Glasgow in 2021.

== History ==
In 1982, Peckham's first opened to fill the gap in the market for specialist consumable products not available in Scotland.

It was also part of their initial ethos to be late-opening, with most stores opening until eight or ten o'clock in the evening and a number remaining open until midnight.

In 2009, Peckham's bought four Mcleish stores: two in Aberdeen, one in Dundee, and one in Broughty Ferry. All four of the former Mcleish stores have now ceased trading.

In 2011 Peckham and Rye went into administration, closing three branches - Newton Mearns, Lenzie and Raeburn Place. All of their specialty delicatessen shops were put up for sale by the administrators, 31 staff were made redundant, and a further 140 jobs were put at risk. It was also reported that Peckham and Rye previously had to fight off a sheriff court petition to wind up the business in July 2002. In 2007 the delicatessen recorded a GBP29,000 pre-tax loss as the company had difficulties absorbing rising costs. In accounts for 2009, Peckham and Rye made an after tax profit of £54,719. Changes to the licensing laws introduced September, 2009 were said to be affecting sales. Since entering administration, a total of eight branches closed - Glasgow's Prestwick Airport and Hyndland Road branches. Edinburgh's Raeburn Place and Bruntsfield Place branches and Aberdeen's Schoolhill and Union Street branches. The branches in Newton Mearns & Lenzie have also closed, causing job loss.

In April 2012, the Hyndland Road branch in Glasgow reopened.

In June 2017, Peckham's Scotland Limited was placed into liquidation shortly after the two remaining stores were taken over by Andrew Duncan and Lee Fish. The pair were able to save 25 jobs and the two remaining branches (Byres Road and Hyndland Road) and continue trading as Peckhams.

In August 2018, Peckham's announced the closure of both remaining stores after the pair failed to attract additional investment, 14 months after their purchase of the sites. Tony Johnston, the original owner of the Peckham's stores, later announced plans of opening up a new branch in Helensburgh, while suggesting that there was an existing legal battle in progress over the use of the brand in the previous two stores. He also suggested the possibility of reopening the shuttered stores.

In 2021, Johnston opened a new branch on the site of the original store on Clarence Drive in the West End of Glasgow. In January 2023, he opened a Peckham's restaurant in Helensburgh.

== Branches ==
Branches included:

- Glasgow - Byres Road
- Glasgow - Central Station
- Glasgow - Clarence Drive
- Glasgow - Clarence Drive (off-sales)
- Glasgow - Glassford Street
- Glasgow - Hyndland Road
- Aberdeen - Union Street
- Aberdeen - Schoolhill
- Aberdeen - Union Square
- Edinburgh - Bruntsfield Place
- Edinburgh - South Clerk Street
- Edinburgh - Raeburn Place
- Edinburgh - Waverley Station
- Lenzie - Kirkintilloch Road
- Newton Mearns
- Prestwick - Prestwick Airport
- Stirling - Port Street

== Notable Staff ==
Notable Peckham's staff include Ireland's 2020 Eurovision entry, Lesley Roy.
