= Taylor Walker & Co =

Defunct English brewery

Taylor Walker was a large English brewery.

== History ==
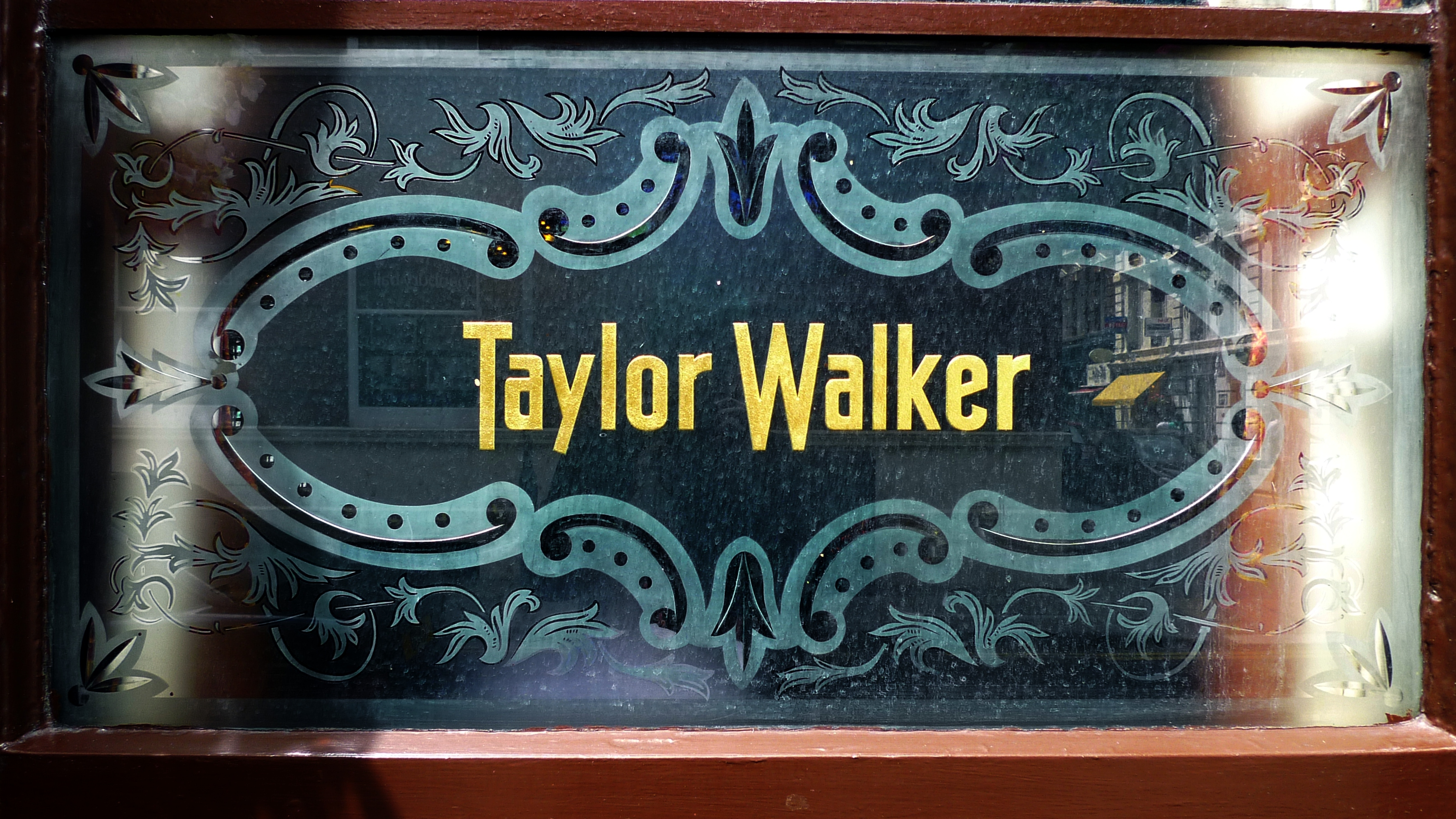
Taylor Walker name preserved in the glass of the Plough pub in London's Bloomsbury district.

Taylor Walker & Co was founded in 1730 in Stepney as Salmon and Hare, and later became Hare and Hartford. In 1796 John Taylor acquired Hare's share, and the company took the name Taylor Walker in 1816 when Isaac Walker became a partner.

The brewery moved to Fore Street, Limehouse in 1823 and into the Barley Mow Brewery in Limehouse in 1889.

Taylor Walker became a public company in 1927. In 1930, a reverse takeover by the Cannon Brewery, which owned more than 600 public houses, most in East London, gave the latter a controlling interest. The Cannon Brewery was owned by the Iggulden family. In 1903 Harold Iggulden became a major shareholder in West Ham United Football Club.

Taylor Walker was taken over by Ind Coope in 1959.

The Barley Mow brewery was closed in 1960 and was demolished in the mid-1960s.

The Barley Mow pub in Limehouse was attached to the brewery, it is now called The Narrow and is owned by Gordon Ramsay Holdings. Beer bearing the Taylor Walker name was brewed at the Burton plant of Allied Breweries until the mid-1990s. Many London pubs had the distinctive Taylor Walker lamp branding outside their premises long after Taylor Walker beer had ceased to be sold.

UK pub and bar operator, Punch Taverns, announced it would resurrect the name Taylor Walker for pubs in London and around the UK on 19 October 2010. This would unite some of the company's most historic and traditional pubs under the Taylor Walker Pubs brand. The Taylor Walker name is still owned by Carlsberg UK, who have signed an agreement with Punch Taverns to use the name for the pubs. Punch Taverns demerged its managed pubs arm as Spirit Pub Company in 2011 and around 120 pubs (106 originally + 92 being in London and the rest being in towns and cities across the UK) eventually took on the Taylor Walker name, although following the Greene King takeover of Spirit Pub Company in 2015, the Taylor Walker brand was retired with the pubs being brought under the Greene King brand.
