= Stuart Whitman on screen and stage =

Roles of actor Stuart Whitman

Stuart Whitman (born Stuart Maxwell Whitman; February 1, 1928 – March 16, 2020), was an American actor, known for his lengthy career in film and television. Whitman was born in San Francisco and raised in New York until his family relocated to Los Angeles. In 1948, Whitman was discharged from the Corps of Engineers in the U.S. Army and started to study acting. From 1951 to 1957, Whitman had a streak working in mostly bit parts in films, including When Worlds Collide (1951), The Day the Earth Stood Still (1951), Barbed Wire (1952), and The Man from the Alamo (1952). On television, Whitman guest-starred in series such as Dr. Christian, The Roy Rogers Show, and Death Valley Days, and also had a recurring role on Highway Patrol. Whitman's first lead role was in John H. Auer's Johnny Trouble (1957).

In the late 1950s, 20th Century Fox was on a drive to develop new talent, hence Whitman was signed to the star-building program. Whitman, now in the lead cast, acted in Darby's Rangers (1958), China Doll (1958), Ten North Frederick (1958), The Decks Ran Red (1958), Hound-Dog Man (1959), These Thousand Hills (1959), The Story of Ruth (1960), Murder, Inc. (1960), The Comancheros (1961), and The Mark (1961), the latter of which he was nominated for an Academy Award for Best Actor.

Some of Whitman's subsequent roles included The Longest Day (1962), Those Magnificent Men in Their Flying Machines (1965), Cimarron Strip (1967), Night of the Lepus (1972), etc. Whitman also acted regularly on television, with some of his credits including Fantasy Island,, The Streets of San Francisco, Love, American Style, Quincy, M.E., The Pirate, Condominium, Knight Rider, Matt Houston, A-Team, S.W.A.T., Murder, She Wrote, Once Upon a Texas Train, Knots Landing, The Adventures of Brisco County, Jr., and Walker, Texas Ranger. From 1988 to 1992, he acted as Jonathan Kent on the TV series Superboy. He was seen in projects until 2000, after which he was reported to be retired, and died in 2020.

== Selected filmography ==
- A Date with Judy (1948) as Young Man in Ballroom (uncredited)
- The Day the Earth Stood Still (1951) as Sentry (uncredited)
- When Worlds Collide (1951) as man by Bank During Instigation (uncredited)
- The Roy Rogers Show: "The Feud" (1952) as Groom
- Barbed Wire (1952) as Cattle-Buyer (uncredited)
- One Minute to Zero (1952) as Officer (uncredited)
- All I Desire (1953) as Dick in Play (uncredited)
- The Man from the Alamo (1953) as Orderly (uncredited)
- All American (1953) as Zip Parker
- The Veils of Bagdad (1953) as Sergeant (uncredited)
- Appointment in Honduras (1953) as Telegrapher (uncredited)
- Walking My Baby Back Home (1953) as Patient (uncredited)
- Rhapsody (1954) as Dove
- Prisoner of War (1954) as Captain (uncredited)
- Silver Lode (1954) as Wicker
- Return from the Sea (1954) as New j.g. (uncredited)
- Brigadoon (1954) as New York Club Patron (uncredited)
- Passion (1954) as Vaquero Bernal (uncredited)
- Interrupted Melody (1955) as man on Beach (uncredited)
- The Magnificent Matador (1955) as man at the Arena (uncredited)
- King of the Carnival (1955, Serial) as Mac, the Acrobat [Ch.1]
- Diane (1956) as Henri's Squire (uncredited)
- Seven Men from Now (1956) as Cavalry Lt. Collins
- Hold Back the Night (1956) as Radio Operator (uncredited)
- Highway Patrol (1956–57) as Sgt. Walters (12 episodes) / Bill Martin (Episode: "Harbor Story")
- Crime of Passion (1957) as Laboratory Technician
- War Drums (1957) as Johnny Smith (uncredited)
- The Girl in Black Stockings (1957) as Prentiss
- Johnny Trouble (1957) as Johnny Chandler
- Hell Bound (1957) as Eddie Mason
- Bombers B-52 (1957) as Maj. Sam Weisberg (uncredited)
- Have Gun – Will Travel (January 25, 1958) Season 1, Episode 20, "The Last Laugh" as Gil Borden
- Darby's Rangers (1958) as Sgt. / SSgt. / Sfc. Hank Bishop
- Ten North Frederick (1958) as Charley Bongiorno
- China Doll (1958) as Lt. Dan O'Neill
- The Decks Ran Red (1958) as Leroy Martin
- The Sound and the Fury (1959) as Charlie Busch
- These Thousand Hills (1959) as Tom Ping
- Hound-Dog Man (1959) as Blackie Scantling
- The Story of Ruth (1960) as Boaz
- Murder, Inc. (1960) as Joey Collins
- The Fiercest Heart (1961) as Steve Bates
- The Mark (1961) as Jim Fuller
- Francis of Assisi (1961) as Count Paolo of Vandria
- The Comancheros (1961) as Paul Regret
- Convicts 4 (1962) as Principal Keeper
- The Longest Day (1962) as Lt. Sheen
- The Day and the Hour (1963) as Capt. Allan Morley
- Shock Treatment (1964) as Dale Nelson / Arthur
- Rio Conchos (1964) as Captain Haven
- Signpost to Murder (1964) as Alex Forrester
- Those Magnificent Men in Their Flying Machines (1965) as Orvil Newton
- Sands of the Kalahari (1965) as Brian O'Brien
- An American Dream (1966) as Stephen Richard Rojack
- Fool's Gold (TV movie) (1967) as Marshal Crown
- Cimarron Strip (TV series) (1967–1968) as Marshal Jim Crown
- The Last Escape (1970) as Lee Mitchell
- The Invincible Six (1970) as Tex
- Ternos Caçadores (1970) as The Prisoner
- The F.B.I. (TV series) (1970–1973) as Rex Benning / Damian Howards / Wesley Ziegler
- City Beneath the Sea (1971) as Admiral Michael Matthews
- Captain Apache (1971) as Griffin
- Revenge! (1971) as Mark Hembric
- Night of the Lepus (1972) as Roy Bennett
- The Woman Hunter (TV movie) (1972) as Paul Carter
- Night Gallery (TV series appearance) (1972) as Tom Ogilvy / Capt. Hendrick Lindemann (segment "Lindemann's Catch")
- Run, Cougar, Run (1972) as Hugh McRae
- The Streets of San Francisco (Episode: "The Set-Up") (1973) as Nick Carl
- The Cat Creature (TV movie) (1973) as Lt. Marco
- Shatter (1974) as Shatter
- Welcome to Arrow Beach (1974) as Deputy Rakes
- Crazy Mama (1975) as Jim Bob
- Las Vegas Lady (1975) as Vic
- Mean Johnny Barrows (1976) as Mario Racconi
- Strange Shadows in an Empty Room (1976) as Capt. Tony Saitta
- Eaten Alive (1976) as Sheriff Martin
- Oil! (1977) as John Carter
- Assault in Paradise (1977) as William Whitaker
- The White Buffalo (1977) as Winifred Coxy
- Run for the Roses (1977) as Charlie
- Ruby (1977) as Vince Kemper
- La mujer de la tierra caliente (1978) as The Man
- The Pirate (TV miniseries) (1978) as Terry Sullivan
- The Seekers (TV miniseries) (1979) as Rev. Blackthorn
- The Treasure Seekers (1979) as Stack Baker
- Guyana: Crime of the Century (1979) as Reverend James Johnson
- Delta Fox (1979) as The Counselor
- Cuba Crossing (1980) as Tony
- Condominium (TV movie) (1980) as Marty Liss
- Under Siege (1980) as The Inspector
- Demonoid (1981) as Father Cunningham
- The Monster Club (1981) as Sam – Movie Director
- Tales of the Unexpected (1981) as Sam Jenner
- Magnum Thrust (1981)
- Butterfly (1982) as Rev. Rivers
- When I Am King (1982) as Smithy
- Invaders of the Lost Gold (1982) as Mark Forrest
- Horror Safari (1982) as Mark Forrest
- Simon & Simon (1982) (TV series appearance)
- Knight Rider (1984) (TV series appearance) as Frank Sanderson
- The Master (1984) (TV series appearance) as Hellman
- Fantasy Island (1978–1984) (TV series appearance) as Rex Reinhardt / Jesse Moreau / Joel Campbell / ...
- Matt Houston (1982–1984) (TV series appearance) as Mr. McCormick / Carl 'The Champ' Ross
- Cover Up (1984) (TV series appearance) as Sheriff Skinner
- The Treasure of the Amazon (1985) as Gringo
- Hunter (1985) as Raymond Bellamy
- Beverly Hills Cowgirl Blues (1985) as Josh Rider
- The A-Team (1983–1985) as Chuck Easterland /Jack Harmon
- First Strike (1985) as Capt. Welch
- Murder, She Wrote (1984–1986) as Charles Woodley / Mr. Bonner
- Vultures (1987) as Carlos 'Carl' Garcia
- Once Upon a Texas Train (1988) as George Asque
- Deadly Intruder (1988) as Capt. Pritchett
- Moving Target (1988) as Joe Frank
- Superboy (TV series) (1988) as Jonathan Kent
- Deadly Reactor (1989) as Duke
- The Color of Evening (1990) as George Larson
- Omega Cop (1990) as Dr. Latimer
- Mob Boss (1990) as Don Francisco
- Heaven and Earth (1990) as narrator (English version) (voice)
- Smoothtalker (1990, Produced by Eduardo Montes-Bradley, directed by Tom Milo) as Lt. Gallagher
- Sandman (1993) as Isaac Tensor
- Lightning in a Bottle (1993) as Jonah Otterman
- Trial by Jury (1994) as Emmett, Valerie's Father
- Improper Conduct (1994) as Frost
- Walker Texas Ranger: Deadly Reunion (1994) as Laredo Jake Boyd
- Land of Milk & Honey (1995) as Robert Riselli
- Second Chances (1998) as Buddy
- The President's Man (2000, TV Movie) as George Williams (final film role)
- Jay Sebring....Cutting to the Truth (2020, Documentary) as himself

== Selected stage work ==
- Venus (1954)
- The Country Girl (1991)
