= Stuart Whitman =

American actor (1928–2020)

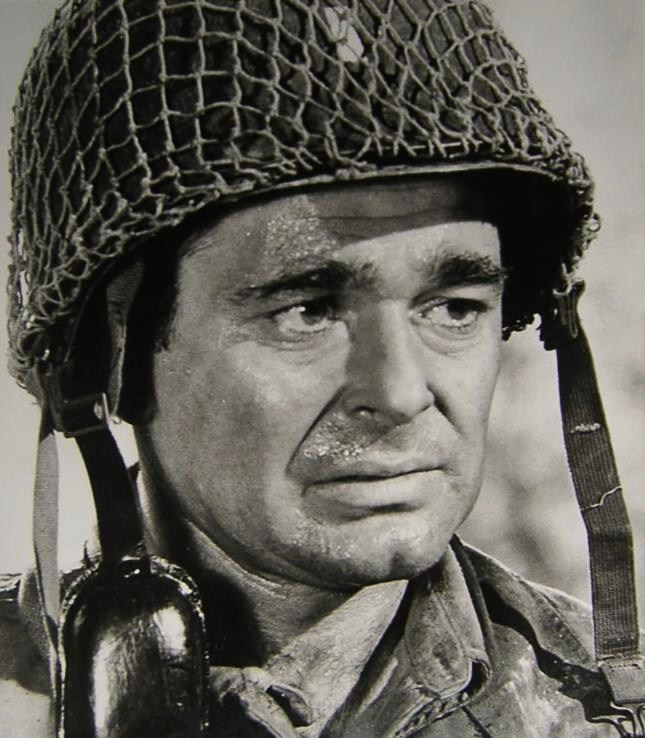
- Whitman in The Longest Day (1962)
- Born: Stuart Maxwell Whitman; February 1, 1928; San Francisco, California, U.S.
- Died: March 16, 2020 (aged 92); Montecito, California, U.S.
- Occupation: Actor
- Years active: 1940–2000
- Spouses: Patricia LaLonde (m. 1952; div. 1966) Caroline Boubis (m. 1966; div. 1974) Julia Paradiz (m. 2006)
- Children: 5

Stuart Maxwell Whitman (February 1, 1928 – March 16, 2020) was an American actor, known for his lengthy career in film and television. Whitman was born in San Francisco and raised in New York until the age of 12, when his family relocated to Los Angeles. In 1948, Whitman was discharged from the United States Army Corps of Engineers and started to study acting and appear in plays. From 1951 to 1957, Whitman had a streak working in mostly bit parts in films, including When Worlds Collide (1951), The Day the Earth Stood Still (1951), Barbed Wire (1952) and The Man from the Alamo (1952). On television, Whitman guest-starred in series such as Dr. Christian, The Roy Rogers Show, and Death Valley Days, and also had a recurring role on Highway Patrol. Whitman's first lead role was in John H. Auer's Johnny Trouble (1957).

In the late 1950s, 20th Century Fox was on a drive to develop new talent, hence Whitman was signed to the star-building program. Whitman, now in the lead cast, acted in Darby's Rangers (1958), China Doll (1958), Ten North Frederick (1958), The Decks Ran Red (1958), Hound-Dog Man (1959), These Thousand Hills (1959), The Story of Ruth (1960), Murder, Inc. (1960), The Comancheros (1961), and The Mark (1961), the latter of which he was nominated for an Academy Award for Best Actor.

Some of Whitman's subsequent roles included The Longest Day (1962), The Day and the Hour (1962), Those Magnificent Men in Their Flying Machines (1965), Cimarron Strip (1967), and Night of the Lepus (1972). Whitman also acted regularly on television, with credits including Have Gun – Will Travel, The Streets of San Francisco, Love, American Style, Quincy, M.E., The Hardy Boys/Nancy Drew Mysteries, The Pirate, Condominium, Knight Rider, Matt Houston, A-Team, S.W.A.T., Fantasy Island, Murder, She Wrote, Once Upon a Texas Train, Knots Landing, The Adventures of Brisco County, Jr. and Walker, Texas Ranger. From 1988 to 1992, he acted as Jonathan Kent on the TV series Superboy. He was seen in projects until 2000, after which he was reported to be retired, and died in 2020.

== Early life ==
Stuart Maxwell Whitman was born on February 1, 1928, in San Francisco, California, the elder of two sons of Cecilia (née Gold) and Joseph Whitman. His family was Jewish. His mother was a Russian Jewish immigrant, while his paternal grandparents were Polish Jews. However, in the 1950s, Whitman described himself to Hedda Hopper as "a real American – have a little bit of English, Irish, Scotch, and Russian – so I get along with everyone."

Whitman was interested in acting from the age of five. His father at the time was working as a ticket collector at Tammany Hall, and he would sometimes be allowed to watch plays. His parents had married in their teens and traveled frequently during his childhood – his father became a lawyer who moved into property development. Whitman started his education in New York, in Manhattan and Poughkeepsie. "I went to so many schools—26 in all!—that I was always an outsider," he later recalled. "It wasn't until high school that I could really read ... I always sat in the back of the room." Whitman's early love for acting came through when he did three summer stock plays in New York when he was 12, but "nobody took that seriously," he said.

His uncle thought he had potential as a boxer, and secretly trained him. When World War II broke out, Joseph Whitman moved to Los Angeles to run oil-cracking plants for the government. His family settled in Los Angeles, and Whitman graduated from Hollywood High School in 1945.

After school, he enlisted in the U.S. Army and served in the Corps of Engineers for three years at Fort Lewis, Washington. During this time, he occasionally boxed, winning 31 of his 32 bouts. Whitman was a lightweight boxer for the Army during his tenure. The boxing match for which he was most known was one where he had a difficult time against U.S. Army boxer Denny Dennison (né Archibald Dennison Scott III), against whom he had boxed at Hollywood High School. Denny, who had entered active duty in January 1944, after five months of the delayed-entry program, had defeated his third opponent, considered his toughest matchup. Whitman was honorably discharged from the Army in 1948, while his close friend, Scott, completed officer candidate school the following year, ending his service with the rank of colonel.

Whitman originally intended to follow his father into law and used the G.I. Bill to enroll in Los Angeles City College. He minored in drama. During his first year, he "figured that law was a real bore", and began to develop ambitions to be an actor.

"I reached a point where I said, 'What are you going to do with your life? You got to get something going'", he said. "I decided I wanted to spend most of my time on me. So I decided to develop me and educate me." "My father wanted me to join his law firm and dabble in real estate on the side," recalled Whitman. "There was a family row about boxing, but nothing like the battle when I told my father I was going to be an actor. He said, 'If that's the case, you're on your own.' No money from him. And he kept his word."

His father did sell Whitman a bulldozer, which his son used to support himself in college. Whitman would hire it (and himself) out to others to clear lots, uproot trees, and level off rugged terrain. This work earned him up to $100 a day. He and his father later went into real estate development together, purchasing various lots in and around Los Angeles.

Whitman joined the Michael Chekhov Stage Society, and studied with them at night for four years. He was considering a career in professional football, but injured his leg at college. He joined the Ben Bard Drama School in Hollywood, and debuted in the school's production of Here Comes Mr Jordan, which ran for six months.

== Career ==
=== 1951–1957: Early roles and first leads ===
Whitman was spotted by a talent scout while at City College. He made his screen debut, credited as Kip Whitman, in a bit part in Rudolph Maté's When Worlds Collide, which was released in November 1951. He followed this with another small part, using the same pseudonym, in Robert Wise's The Day the Earth Stood Still, released in September of that same year.

In 1952, Whitman continued playing small roles, starting with George Archainbaud's Barbed Wire, released in July, and Tay Garnett's One Minute to Zero, released in August. In December 1952, he signed a contract with Universal, which put him in Douglas Sirk's All I Desire, released in July 1953, and Jesse Hibbs's The All American, released in October.

Whitman was still cast in small parts in features premiering in 1953. This began with Budd Boetticher's The Man from the Alamo, released in August. Following this was Jacques Tourneur's Appointment in Honduras, which premiered on October 16. The next was George Sherman's The Veils of Bagdad, in November. Finally, Lloyd Bacon's Walking My Baby Back Home started its theatrical run in December.

In 1954, Whitman continued to be seen in minor film roles. First was Charles Vidor's Rhapsody at Metro-Goldwyn-Mayer (MGM), on April 16. On May 14, it was Andrew Marton's Prisoner of War, followed in June by Allan Dwan's Silver Lode. On July 25, it was Lesley Selander's Return from the Sea. Premiering on October 6 was Passion. He then appeared in Brigadoon on October 22. He starred on stage in Christopher Fry's Venus Observed at the Coast Theatre in 1954. On television, Whitman acted in episodes of Dr. Christian, The Roy Rogers Show, and Death Valley Days.

On July 1, 1955, Whitman appeared as a man on the beach in Curtis Bernhardt's Interrupted Melody. Also that year, Whitman had a minor role in the serial King of the Carnival.

In 1956, Whitman continued with the same types of roles, starting with Allan Dwan's Hold Back the Night on July 29, followed by Budd Boetticher's Seven Men from Now on August 4. Another acting credit was the Republic Pictures film Diane.

Starting that year, he began a recurring role as Sgt. Walters on the television series Highway Patrol, appearing in a total of sixteen episodes. Whitman explained that, at the time, he was working part-time in a slaughterhouse, and when he got the role, he and its star Broderick Crawford got along immediately and became friends. From that point on, whenever Whitman was low on cash, he would call Crawford who would gladly invite him to appear in another episode, on the premise that he could drink while Whitman handled most of the dialogue.

In 1957, Whitman's film roles gradually grew in size with the following films: Gerd Oswald's Crime of Passion, which opened in February, and Reginald LeBorg's War Drums, in April. On September 21, Whitman had his first leading role in John H. Auer's Johnny Trouble, produced by John Carroll, who had Whitman under contract for one film a year for seven years; the Los Angeles Times said he "reminds of both Robert Ryan and James Dean." In October, he appeared in two releases: Hell Bound and Howard W. Koch's The Girl in Black Stockings. On November 30, it was Gordon Douglas' Bombers B-52.

Early prominent roles in 1957 were in the syndicated military dramas Harbor Command, about the United States Coast Guard, and The Silent Service, based on true stories of the submarine service of the United States Navy. Around that time, Whitman acted in "Until the Man Dies", episode 16 of the first season of Zane Grey Theatre.

=== 1958–1961: Success on and off the screen ===
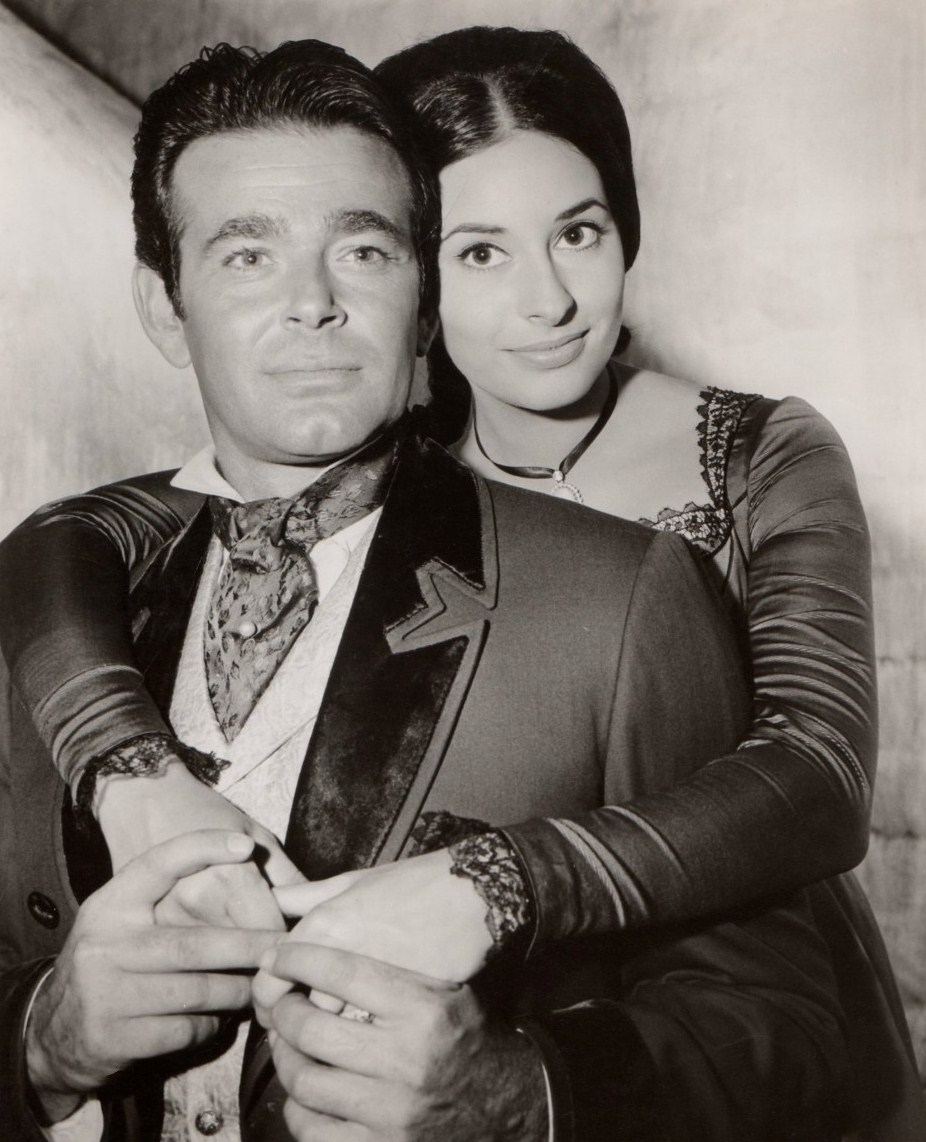
Whitman and Ina Balin in The Comancheros (1961)

By this time, Whitman's side career as a real estate developer was thriving. He developed hundreds of acres in such places as Anaheim, Benedict Canyon, and Panorama City, often in partnership with his father. "Because of it, I've never worked as an extra," he said in 1958. "I've never accepted a part that I wouldn't have thought advanced my career. I've never taken an acting job, in movies or TV, which paid less than $250 a week."

In the late 1950s, 20th Century Fox was on a drive to develop new talent. Head of production Buddy Adler said, "We must bring young people back into film theatres and the best way is to develop young stars as a magnet. While stories have become more important than ever, we must seek our fresh, youthful talent to perform in them." Whitman was one of a number of new names signed to Fox by Adler as part of a $3–4 million star-building program. Whitman's contract was for seven years.

In January 1958, William A. Wellman's Darby's Rangers premiered. During the film's production, roles fluctuated: the lead, Charlton Heston, left the film and James Garner was given the lead, while Whitman wound up with Garner's original role, which dominated the first half of the picture then barely appeared in the second half. Whitman was one of several actors who tested for the role of Bart Maverick In March 1958, the contract with FOX became exclusive. In June, production of Richard Fleischer's These Thousand Hills began. In May, Ten North Frederick began its theatrical run. Whitman later said he did this to get a choice small part and "many good things came from that". In August, Whitman appeared in China Doll.

In October, MGM's production of Andrew L. Stone's The Decks Ran Red, in which he was cast, was released. According to Whitman, he helped with the signing of his friend Broderick Crawford, promising the studio that Crawford would stay sober throughout the shoot. Crawford was hired and maintained his promise.

At that time, director Andrew L. Stone wanted Whitman to appear in The Last Voyage (1960), but the role went to Robert Stack instead. Fox granted him another role when he replaced Robert Wagner in The Sound and the Fury (1959). Also in 1959, Whitman acted in "The Last Laugh", the 20th episode of the first season of Have Gun – Will Travel. Another TV credit came with The Court of Last Resort, in an episode called "The Westover Case".

In 1958, Hedda Hopper wrote a piece on Whitman which said he could be the "new Clark Gable":

This is a fresh personality with tremendous impact. He's tall and lean with shock of unruly black hair and dark hazel eyes which harden to slate grey when he plays a bad man or turns on the heat in a love scene. When he comes into camera range, the audience sits up and says: "Who dat?"

In 1959, Whitman acted in several features. In February, Richard Fleischer's Western These Thousand Hills premiered. In March, The Sound and the Fury was released. At Fox, Whitman graduated to leading-man parts. In November, Don Siegel's Hound-Dog Man premiered. Whitman had an excellent role co-starring with Fabian Forte playing his "fourth heel in a row... I had a ball because the character was a real louse, everything hanging off him and no inhibitions. I like those kind of guys, I suppose because I can't be that way myself."

In May 1960, the Los Angeles Times did a profile on Whitman, calling him "an actor of growing importance in a business that needs stalwarts to follow in the steps of the Clark Gables, Gary Coopers, and John Waynes... Whitman is like a finely trained athletic champion – a modest but self-assured chap who seems to know where he is going."

The premiere of Henry Koster's Biblical drama The Story of Ruth, in which Whitman had replaced Stephen Boyd as Boaz, was in June 1960. Whitman's next release was in July, with the gangster tale Murder, Inc.. "I've done lots of different parts since I left Hollywood High School and City College", said Whitman in a 1960 interview, "so the sudden switch didn't bother me too much. I hope 20th Century Fox will keep the roles varied and interesting." Whitman said the production of Murder, Inc. was troubled. First, when he was reading the script, he was under the impression that he was going to play the role for which Peter Falk was already cast, but he was actually cast as the romantic lead. Additionally, director Stuart Rosenberg was fired by the studio because they felt he was taking too much time setting up shots. Once fired, an actor's sitdown strike began, and it was announced that a full strike was going to happen. This put the studio under pressure to finish the project, hence producer Burt Balaban, who shares the directorial credit with Rosenberg, stepped in and finished the film in a week, and on the exact day when the strike started.

In January 1961, Guy Green's The Mark had its London premiere. The role came about when Whitman was frustrated with the sort of roles he was getting. "I had been knocking around and not getting anything to test my ability", he said. When Richard Burton turned down the role of a child molester in The Mark to do Camelot on stage, Whitman said that he was asked by his agent to fly to Ireland to act in the film, without his agent telling him what it was about. Whitman didn't know the controversial nature of the role until he read the script on location. Impressed and frightful of the content, Whitman had doubts and asked himself if he was in the right business, but came to the conclusion that he could pull it off. Whitman's performance earned him rave reviews and an Oscar nomination for Best Actor. He said the film "doubled my rating as an actor". However, he later said, "I had a tough time breaking my image in that movie... it blocked my image as a gutsy outdoorsman."

On April 11, 1961, Whitman appeared in The Fiercest Heart, which was shot in South Africa and debuted in San Francisco. On July 12, Whitman appeared in Michael Curtiz's religious epic Francis of Assisi. According to Whitman, while on the set, Curtiz told him that he would like him for a role in his next film, the Western The Comancheros, an adaptation of a novel by Paul Wellman. Whitman loved the idea, but was booked by the studio elsewhere. The only way to rectify this was for Whitman to talk with the film's star John Wayne, as only Wayne could ask the studio heads to arrange for Whitman to play the part. Whitman went and introduced himself to Wayne and convinced him to do this. On November 1, The Comancheros premiered. In it, Whitman played Paul Regret, who flees the law to avoid death but is eventually captured by Texas Ranger Captain Jake Cutter (Wayne).

Around the same time, Jerry Wald cast Whitman in The Hell Raisers, about the Boxer Rebellion, but it was never filmed. Whitman also lobbied unsuccessfully to play the lead in Sanctuary (1961). Later in 1961, he announced he would form his own production company to make Mandrake Route by Frederick Wakeman. He also stated that his bulldozer had "developed into quite a sideline. I'm sure I still wouldn't be in the picture business without it."

In an interview later that year, Whitman said, "I've had to battle and say what is an actor? It's a fellow who plays someone else. But now I realize it's the image that makes a star. John Wayne is a great example of a super actor. Gary Cooper is another one. My image? I think it's being free and easy and all man. I say to myself I want to become an actor, I want to lose myself in each role. But that's not the way to become an actor."

=== 1962–1969: Hollywood leading man ===
On June 15, 1962, Millard Kaufman's Convicts 4 premiered, in which Whitman appeared. On October 11, Whitman appeared in the all-star World War II epic The Longest Day. It was directed by several major directors, and opened in Los Angeles on that day. Whitman was cast in the role after being asked to deliver a box of cigars to producer Darryl F. Zanuck at the time of shooting. Zanuck asked him to be part of it and Whitman agreed. Zanuck directed Whitman's segments. Also that year, Whitman announced that he might do Mandrake Root, The Victors (1963), or a film with either Marilyn Monroe or Lewis Milestone.

However, in 1963, instead of choosing any of these roles, Whitman played an American pilot in the French film The Day and the Hour, directed by René Clément, shot in Paris and set during World War II. As described by Whitman, he got the part through Alain Delon, who he bumped into in an elevator at the Beverly Hills Hotel. Delon invited him to meet the director, and eventually worked out a way to loan him out from his studio contract. During the production of the film, Whitman disagreed with Clément on the direction of a torture scene and swore to Clément that he himself could handle it. After coincidentally sitting on a plane next to Sidney Buchman, who co-wrote The Mark, they re-wrote the scene together. Whitman directed the scene but did not direct again. He described Clément as one of the finest French directors. He enjoyed the experience, saying, "I busted through at last and can now get an honest emotion, project it and make it real. You become egocentric when you involve yourself to such an extent in your role; your next problem is in learning how to turn it off and come home and live with society. It took a lot of time and energy to break through, so I could honestly feel and I'm reluctant to turn it off. Now I know why so many actors go to psychiatrists."

Also that year, Whitman acted in the second episode of the first season of Bob Hope Presents the Chrysler Theatre, called "Killing at Sundial". In it, Whitman plays a Native American who became wealthy throughout life and is now seeking to avenge the death of his father, who was lynched years prior. Also at that time, Whitman was announced as the lead in Cardinal (1963), and he lobbied to play Jimmy Hoffa in an adaptation of The Enemy Within by Robert F. Kennedy; however, the first role was lost to Tom Tryon and the second film was never made. He then adjusted his contract with Fox to stipulate one film a year for five years. After several months off, Whitman announced plans to produce his own film, My Brother's Keeper, based on a novel about the Collyer brothers. However, he moved on to do other projects.

On February 19, 1964, Whitman acted in Shock Treatment, which opened in Los Angeles. On November 12, Gordon Douglas' Western Rio Conchos opened, with Whitman cast as one of its three leads. The other two were Richard Boone and Anthony Franciosa. Whitman said that he didn't like the script, but producer Darryl F. Zanuck told him that if he would do it, he would then be cast as a lead in Ken Annakin's upcoming film, Those Magnificent Men in Their Flying Machines (1965), in a role the studio had initially intended to give Dick Van Dyke. Whitman went on to have a meeting with actor Boone and director Douglas. He thought highly of them and accepted. Annakin had to accept the studio's wishes, and despite Whitman not being his first choice, Annakin was very happy with Whitman's performance.

On February 10, 1965, George Englund's Signpost to Murder premiered, which starred Whitman. On May 3, Whitman was confirmed as the main actor for Cy Endfield's Sands of the Kalahari. Whitman became the lead after the production company courted many actors such as Richard Burton, Robert Mitchum, Albert Finney, Marlon Brando and Warren Beatty. Eventually, George Peppard was cast as the lead but abandoned it early into the production, and while Alan Bates was considered, Whitman was confirmed. Whitman said that he won the role after reading in Variety about the departure of Peppard; he went to the Beverly Hills Hotel and bumped into the producer, to whom he jokingly suggested himself for the role. The producers called him that same evening to fly to Africa to star in it. Whitman found the shoot difficult, due to the hot weather and the fact that the baboons, with whom he had fight scenes, were not properly trained and lived in decrepit conditions, as well as having no animal control. The film premiered on November 10.

June 16, 1965, saw the release of Annakin's Those Magnificent Men in Their Flying Machines. In this British period comedy film, Whitman is featured amongst an international ensemble cast, including Sarah Miles, Robert Morley, Terry-Thomas, James Fox, Red Skelton, Benny Hill, Jean-Pierre Cassel, Gert Fröbe and Alberto Sordi. The film, revolving around the craze of early aviation circa 1910, is about a pompous newspaper magnate (Morley) who is convinced by his daughter (Miles) and fiancée (Fox), a young army officer, to organize an air race from London to Paris. A large sum of money is offered to the winner and it hence attracts a variety of characters who participate. Whitman appears as the American entrant, one of its top participants. The film received positive reviews, in which they said the film was funny, colorful, clever and captured the early enthusiasm for aviation. It was treated as a major production, one of only three full-length 70 mm Todd-AO Fox releases in 1965, with an intermission and musical interlude being part of the original screenings. Because of the Todd-AO process, the film was an exclusive roadshow feature initially shown in deluxe Cinerama venues, where customers needed reserved seats purchased ahead of time. The film grossed $31.1 million theatrically and made $29.9 million in home video sales. Audiences, both then and now, have been nearly unanimous in assessing the film as one of the "classic" aviation films.

In 1966, Whitman appeared in Robert Gist's An American Dream, based on a novel by Norman Mailer. Around this time, Whitman returned to Bob Hope Presents the Chrysler Theatre in the episode "The Highest Fall of All", in which he played a suicidal stuntman who is willing to do an extremely dangerous fall for a director.

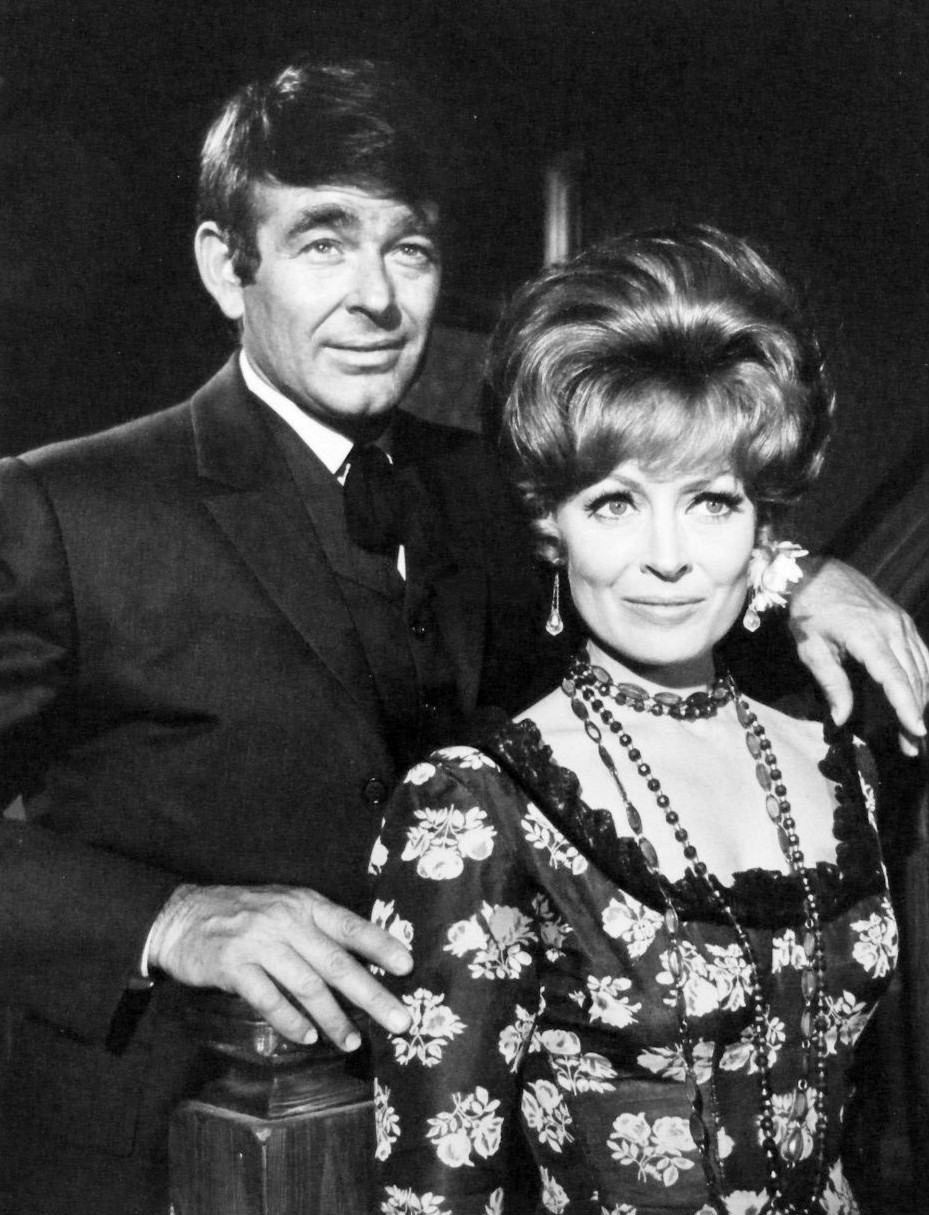
Whitman and Victoria Shaw in Cimarron Strip (1967)

Whitman had turned down a number of offers to star on television series over the years, including Mannix and Judd, for the Defense. "I wanted more diversity in acting," he said. "I felt I would limit myself." However, on September 7, 1967, the TV show Cimarron Strip premiered, starring Whitman. "A lot of big people told me I was the number one man the networks wanted," said Whitman. The show was expensive, costing $350,000–$400,000 per episode with each having a broadcast time of 90 minutes, and was the most expensive drama series made up to that time. The series was produced by Whitman's own company. "I always wanted to play a cop with a heart, a guy who would use every possible means not to kill a man," he said. "TV has needed a superhero... and I think Crown can be the guy." While Whitman received good reviews for his performance, many criticized the show for having thin plots, and it was met with disappointing ratings. Its time slot had major competition: Daniel Boone came out on top, and while The Flying Nun remained, Batman was pushed to another time slot and Cimarron Strip was cancelled.

In 1969, Whitman acted in Sweet Hunters. According to John Gregory Dunne's book The Studio (1969), Whitman was suggested for the title role in The Boston Strangler (1968) by John Bottomly, the Massachusetts assistant attorney general who prosecuted Albert DeSalvo. Instead, the role went to Tony Curtis.

=== 1970–1987: Subsequent projects ===
In 1967, Whitman admitted, "I'm the type who must work constantly." In the early 1970s, he worked increasingly in Europe. "I left Hollywood because it was getting to be a mad mess!" he said. "There are only about two really good scripts going around and they always go to the industry's two top stars. I thought that in Europe, something better might come my way—and it did! I've made mistakes in the past, but I kept bouncing back. I always thought that an actor is destined to act, but I now realize that if you do one role well, you get stuck with it!"

On September 25, 1970, Whitman was seen in the Bracken's World episode "Murder Off-Camera". Also that year, Whitman appeared in the films The Last Escape and The Invincible Six. He was also in an episode of The F.B.I., and appeared in several more.

On October 26, 1971, Whitman acted in Captain Apache, The City Beneath the Sea, and the television film Revenge!

On January 12, 1972, "Lindemann's Catch", an episode of Rod Serling's Night Gallery, aired, written by Rod Serling and directed by Jeff Corey. The story is about a cold hearted sea captain (Whitman) who captures a mermaid.

In July, Whitman acted in William F. Claxton's newly released horror film Night of the Lepus. In it, Whitman and Janet Leigh play a couple of zoologists who are looking for ways to reduce the rabbit population that has infested a nearby ranch. They test a serum on some rabbit specimens that would cause them birth defects, and hence reduce the population. One of them escapes, and soon after the area is infested and under attack by giant rabbits. The production was troubled and the film was critically lambasted upon release. Whitman said that he ended up with the role because at the time he was working with Lee Remick on a film called The Candy Man, which was cancelled. When he requested his salary and was turned down, he was told he would be compensated only if he took the lead in Night of the Lepus, the screenplay of which he found to be ridiculous right from the start. He went on to say that the film damaged his reputation and wasn't bankable. Despite its poor reputation, the film developed a cult status, but was retrospectively described by critics as ridiculous and unintentionally funny.

October 18 was the premiere of Disney's Run, Cougar, Run, directed by Jerome Courtland and starring Whitman. On December 2, Whitman appeared in the "Carnival/The Vaudevillians" episode of Fantasy Island. That same month, on the 10th, Whitman made a second appearance on Night Gallery in an episode titled Fright Night. Another TV show in which he appeared was Ghost Story. Whitman also appeared in The Woman Hunter that year.

On January 25, 1973, Whitman guest starred in an episode of The Streets of San Francisco titled "The Set Up". On April 13, the made-for-television film The Man Who Died Twice premiered, with Whitman in the lead role. On September 21, Whitman appeared in the "Love and the Lifter; The Comedienne; The Lie; The Suspicious Husband" episode of Love, American Style. On November 23, Whitman acted in the Hec Ramsey episode "A Hard Road to Vengeance".

In 1974, Whitman acted in the horror movie Welcome to Arrow Beach.

During the week of October 20, 1975, Call Him Mr Shatter premiered, in which Whitman had the lead role. On October 29, Whitman guest starred in the "Man in the Middle" episode of Cannon. On November 27, Fred Williamson's Mean Johnny Barrows premiered, in which Whitman played a supporting role. Also that year, Whitman acted in Jonathan Demme's Crazy Mama.

On January 24, 1976, Whitman appeared in part one of the two-part episode "The Running Man" of the show S.W.A.T.. On March 9, Whitman was the leading man in the Italian action film Strange Shadows in an Empty Room, premiering in Italy before going worldwide. It was shot in Canada, both in Ottawa and Montreal. According to director Alberto de Martino, Whitman agreed to the project in order to work outside of Hollywood. On the 23rd of that month, Las Vegas Lady was released, in which Whitman took part. Also that year, the film The Treasure Seekers wrapped, where Whitman played a role. It was written by and starred Rod Taylor, and co-starred Elke Sommer. Due to problems while shooting and in post production, the film only achieved a limited release a number of years later. Finally he acted in Harry O, and Ellery Queen.

On the second of January 1977, the episode "Hot Ice Cold Hearts" of the TV show Quincy, M.E. aired, with Whitman as a guest star. On February 19, he guest starred in Most Wanted, in the episode "Tunnel Killer". In early June, Whitman appeared in Ruby, which opened theatrically. On October 5, Whitman appeared in J. Lee Thompson's The White Buffalo, starring Charles Bronson. On October 16, Whitman appeared in The Hardy Boys/Nancy Drew Mysteries episode "The Mystery of the African Safari". As early as October 19, Whitman appeared in the newly released Maniac! On November 30, Tobe Hooper's Eaten Alive premiered, with Whitman in a supporting role. That year, he also acted in Mircea Drăgan's Oil – The Billion Dollar Fire. Whitman said that he found shooting a Romanian film problematic because extras would talk during rehearsals and takes. When Whitman complained to the assistant director, who then reported the issue to the director, he returned telling him to continue or they would shoot him. From that point on, Whitman accepted the work conditions.

In 1978, Whitman acted in a television miniseries directed by Ken Annakin called The Pirate. Also that year, he appeared in the Henry Levin film Run for the Roses.

On February 8, 1979, the three-part mini-series Women in White first aired, and Whitman shared the lead with Susan Flannery. On November 14 and 15, 1979, the four-hour, two-part mini-series The Seekers aired, in which Whitman played a supporting role. That year, Whitman also acted in the film Delta Fox.

In 1980, Whitman acted in René Cardona Jr.'s Guyana: Cult of the Damned, and Los Traficantes De Panico, also known as Under Siege. On November 29, Whitman guest starred in Condominium, which first aired on WPIX. The telefilm is a two-part episode of the four-hour long adaptation of the John D. MacDonald novel. Whitman also acted in Cuba Crossing, and The Monster Club.

On April 19, 1981, Whitman appeared in the Tales of the Unexpected episode "The Boy Who Talked with Animals". Whitman also appeared in the season 5 episode of Fantasy Island called "The Lady and the Monster; The Last Cowboy". In films, Whitman appeared in Demonoid, When I Am King, and Horror Safari.

In 1982, he appeared in Matt Cimber's film Butterfly. On October 16, Whitman appeared in the "Curse of the Moreaus; My Man Friday" episode of Fantasy Island. On November 18, Whitman appeared in the Simon & Simon episode called "The Rough Rider Rides Again".

On April 5, 1983, Whitman appeared in the season one episode of The A-Team titled "West-Coast Turnaround".

On April 30, 1984, Whitman hosted the documentary Hollywood Roughcuts. On May 27, Whitman appeared in the "Big Iron" episode of Knight Rider. On November 25, Whitman appeared in "Hit, Run, and Homicide", an episode of Murder, She Wrote. On December 7, Whitman played a killer in the show Matt Houston. On the 8th of that month, Whitman also appeared in the "Midnight Highway" episode of the show Cover Up. Also that year, he appeared in episodes of Hotel. In films, Whitman appeared in First Strike.

In 1985, Whitman appeared in Deadly Intruder and René Cardona Jr.'s The Treasure of the Amazon. On television, Whitman appeared in the series Finder of Lost Loves, an episode of Tales from the Darkside,, the Hunter episode "The Biggest Man in Town", and The A-Team episode "Blood, Sweat and Cheers". That year, CBS aired the television film Beverly Hills Cowgirl Blues, starring James Brolin and Lisa Hartman with a supporting turn from Whitman.

In 1986, the film Vultures aired on TV, starring Whitman and Meredith MacRae. It also had a home video release. On January 22, 1986, Whitman was a guest star on Blacke's Magic. On February 17, Whitman was also the guest on TV-show Hardcastle and McCormick. On October 9, Whitman appeared in the episode "Phil After All These Years" of the show Simon & Simon.

On February 10, 1987, CBS first aired the television-film adaptation of Mary Higgins Clark's novel Stillwatch, where Whitman played a supporting role. On May 27, Whitman appeared in the season finale of Hotel. In November, he appeared in the "Trouble in Eden" episode of Murder, She Wrote. Also that year, Whitman appeared in one episode of Jack and Mike.

=== 1988–2000: Later career and retirement ===
In 1988, Whitman appeared in the television-film Once Upon a Texas Train and an episode of J.J. Starbuck. On May 2, the first episode of Ernest Hemingway's biography miniseries called Hemingway premiered, in which Whitman played the subject's father. The first season of the series Superboy began that year, which focused on Superman/Clark Kent during his college years; Whitman played Jonathan Kent.

During his tenure on Superboy, Whitman appeared in other projects. In 1989, Whitman acted in Deadly Reactor and Gypsy.

In 1990, Whitman started to play a recurring character on Knots Landing. Also that year, Whitman played supporting roles in Moving Target, Omega Cop, and Mob Boss.

In 1991, Whitman provided the narration for the Japanese film Heaven & Earth and acted in The Color of Evening. On stage, Whitman acted in The Country Girl. In a 1991 interview with the Los Angeles Times, Whitman said, "I was bankable for a while, then I did a couple of shows that didn't make any money. Then I wasn’t bankable... As an actor, you've got to keep working. You've got to do something to feed the family, put the kids through school."

In 1992, Whitman appeared in an episode of Murder, She Wrote. That year, Whitman had supporting roles in the films Smooth Talker and Sandman.

In 1993, Whitman appeared in an episode of the TV show Time Trax. In films, Whitman appeared in Lightning in a Bottle and Private Wars. Whitman also guest starred in the two-hour special debut of the TV series The Adventures of Brisco County, Jr..

In 1994, Whitman was a guest on the television show Walker, Texas Ranger. In films, Whitman appeared in Improper Conduct and Trial by Jury.

In 1995, Whitman appeared in the television film Wounded Heart and an episode of the TV series Courthouse.

In 1996, Whitman appeared in the film Land of Milk & Honey and the short film Two Weeks from Sunday. Also that year, Whitman appeared in the television film Shaughnessy: The Iron Marshal, an adaptation of the Louis L'Amour novel Shaughnessy.

In 1997, Whitman voiced a character in the children's animated series Aaahh!!! Real Monsters.

On February 1, 1998, Whitman was awarded a star on the Hollywood Walk of Fame. Also that year, Whitman appeared in the film Second Chances.

In 2000, Whitman appeared in the television film The President's Man.

Afterwards, Whitman was reported to be retired. He became financially independent through a combination of property developments and his acting income. "I didn't need to act to make a living, but had a real passion for it – I just loved to act," said Whitman.

== Personal life ==
=== Family and relationships ===
Whitman's first marriage was to Patricia LaLonde (October 13, 1952 – 1966). They had four children—Tony (born 1953), Michael (born 1954), Linda (born 1956), and Scott (born 1958)—before getting divorced.

Stuart remarried in 1966, to French-born Caroline Boubis. They had one son together, Justin, before divorcing in 1974. In 2006, he wed Julia Paradiz, a Russian woman he met at a friend's wedding in St. Petersburg, Russia in 1971.

=== Friendships ===
In an interview, Whitman said that he and Broderick Crawford clicked upon meeting on the set of Highway Patrol. Whenever Whitman was low on cash, he would tell Crawford, who continued to re-invite him. Both would hang-out outside of the workplace. Later, Whitman helped Crawford to be cast in The Decks Ran Red.

Another The Decks Ran Red co-star Whitman commented on was Dorothy Dandridge, who was going through a divorce and had to institutionalize her mentally ill daughter. Whitman was impressed with her strength and described her as a goddess.

Whitman said that when he first met Peter Falk on the set of Murder, Inc., they had their differences but eventually became friends. Whitman found The Mark director Guy Green difficult to work with, finding him demanding and too strict, but they became good friends afterwards. On the set of Sands of the Kalahari, Whitman said he became best friends with fellow cast members Stanley Baker and Theodore Bikel. While he didn't click with Jim Brown at first, they too became friends.

In the same piece, Whitman said that Terry-Thomas was one of his best friends. After their collaboration on Those Magnificent Men in Their Flying Machines, both would meet for drinks, visit one another, and swim in the ocean while on Whitman's beachfront home in Malibu.

== Death ==
Whitman died on March 16, 2020, from skin cancer at his Montecito, California home. Survivors included his wife, Julia; four children from his first marriage, Linda Whitman van Hook and Anthony, Michael and Scott Whitman; a son from his second marriage, Justin Whitman; a brother, actor Kipp Whitman; seven grandchildren; and four great-grandchildren.

== Awards and honors ==
- Nominated for Best Actor Academy Award – The Mark (1961)
- Winner (cast member) Western Heritage Awards – The Comancheros (1961)
- Included on the Hollywood Walk of Fame (1998)

== Works cited ==
- Petkovich, Anthony (2013). "Interview with Stuart Whitman". Shock Cinema. No. 44.
