= Richard H. Cutting =

American film and television actor

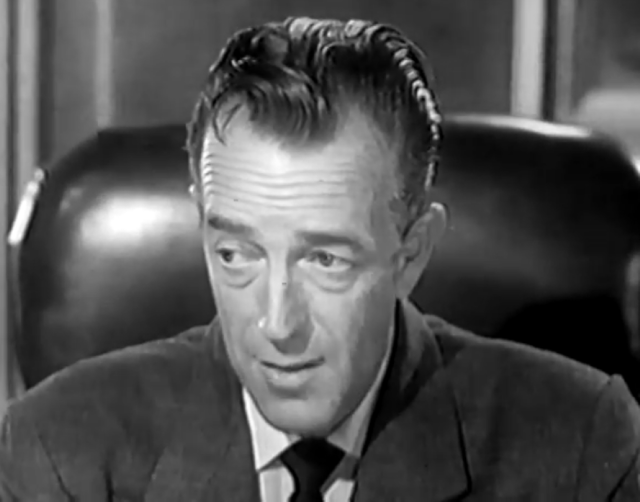
- Cutting in Medic, 1956
- Born: Richard Hiram Cutting; October 31, 1912; Massachusetts, U.S.
- Died: March 7, 1973 (aged 60); Woodland Hills, California, U.S.
- Occupations: Film and television actor
- Spouse: Edwina Booth Waterbury (m. 1951)

Richard Hiram Cutting (October 31, 1912 – March 7, 1973) was an American film and television actor.

== Life and career ==
Cutting was born in Massachusetts. He began his screen career in 1953, appearing in the film Law and Order. In the same year, he appeared in the films The Great Jesse James Raid, The Man from the Alamo, War Paint and City of Bad Men, and provided the voice of a radio announcer in the film It Came from Outer Space.

Later in his career, Cutting made his television debut in the NBC western television series Hopalong Cassidy. He guest-starred in numerous television programs including Bonanza, Wagon Train, Tales of Wells Fargo, The Legend of Jesse James, Sugarfoot, Death Valley Days, 26 Men, Perry Mason, Maverick, Cheyenne and The Man Behind the Badge. He also appeared in the films such as South Pacific, The Great Jesse James Raid, War Drums, The Girl in Black Stockings, The Horse Soldiers, The Last of the Fast Guns, The Monolith Monsters, Rock All Night, Attack of the Crab Monsters and Outside the Law.

Cutting retired from acting in 1967, last appearing in the film The Ride to Hangman's Tree.

== Personal life and death ==
Cutting married Edwina Booth Waterbury, a great-granddaughter of actor Edwin Booth and granddaughter of writer Edwina Booth Grossman.

Cutting died on March 7, 1973, in Woodland Hills, California, at the age of 60.
