= Dennis Holahan =

American attorney and actor (born 1942)

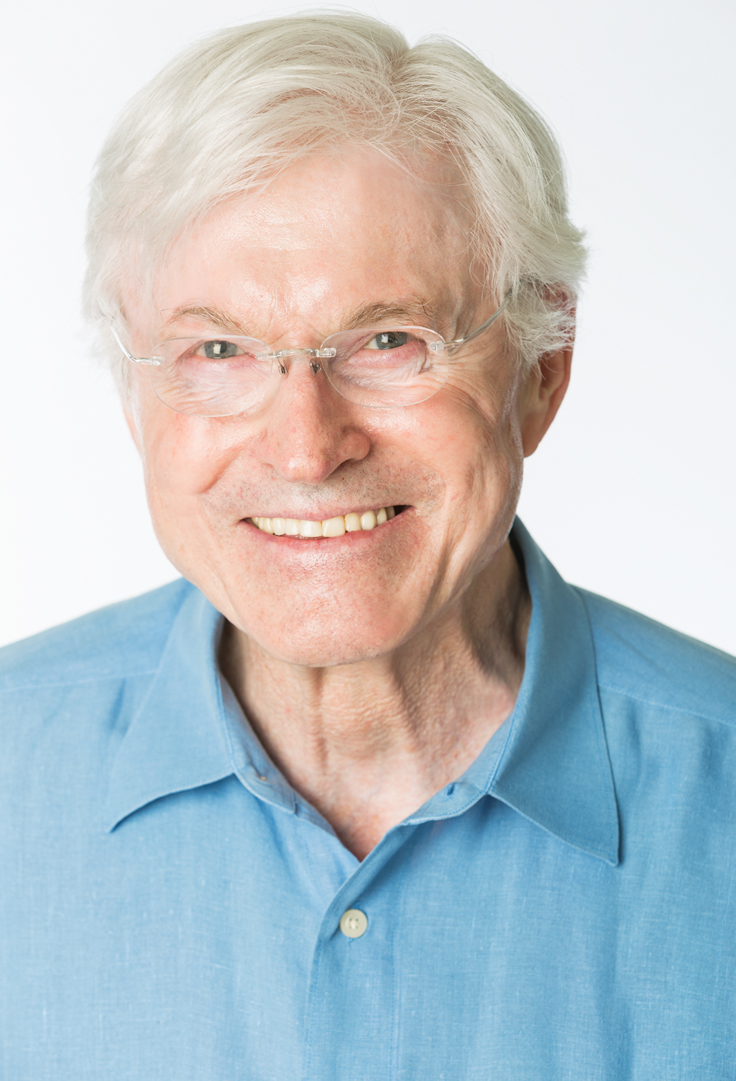
- Born: November 7, 1942 (age 83); Stamford, Connecticut, U.S.
- Education: Phillips Academy; Yale University (BA); University of California, Hastings Law School in San Francisco (JD)
- Occupations: Actor; entertainment lawyer
- Years active: 1973–present
- Spouses: Wylie O'Hara (m. 1966; div. 1972) Loretta Swit (m. 1983; div. 1995)
- Children: 2
- Military career
- Allegiance: United States
- Branch: United States Navy
- Service years: 1966–1969
- Rank: Lieutenant (junior grade)
- Conflicts: Vietnam War
- Awards: Meritorious Unit Commendation

Dennis Holahan (born November 7, 1942) is an American attorney and former actor. He was a partner in the San Francisco office of Lewis Brisbois Bisgaard & Smith, California’s largest law firm, where he specialized in entertainment, media, and intellectual property cases as well as more general matters in the firm’s commercial litigation practice. Prior to joining Lewis Brisbois in 2014, Dennis maintained one of the top entertainment and business-related litigation boutiques in Los Angeles for more than 20 years.

== Early life and education ==
Holahan was raised in Connecticut. After graduating from Yale University in 1965, Holahan served as an officer (Lieutenant, J.G.) in the United States Navy on an amphibious assault ship in Vietnam from 1967 to 1969. He was awarded the Vietnam Service Medal with a silver star for five campaigns, a National Defense Service Medal, a Meritorious Unit Commendation, the Republic of Vietnam Meritorious Unit Citation, and the Republic of Vietnam Campaign Medal.

== Career ==
Holahan graduated from Hastings College of Law in 1973. At Hastings he was the recipient of the Hale Moot Court Prize for Best Brief, was an editor of the Hastings Law News, 1972–73, and a founder of the Hastings Child Care Center. After Hastings he worked for a litigation firm in the financial district in San Francisco for two years.

=== Acting ===
From 1976 to 1992, he took a hiatus from his law practice to pursue a successful career as an actor in films and television. Holahan is best known for appearing with Al Pacino in the crime film Scarface as Jerry the Banker. Notable other roles included Collision Course, Kuffs, Haywire (mini-series) and Aspen Extreme, as well as television appearances in M*A*S*H, Hill Street Blues, Lou Grant and The Rockford Files. He also appeared in the movie The Vegas Strip War in 1984 playing Jimmy Weldstrom. He played a lawyer in his 1981 appearance on The White Shadow. His character interviewed James Hayward (Thomas Carter) for a summer job.

=== Return to law ===
In 1992 Holahan went back to the legal career he had put on hold in 1976. He started the Law Office of Dennis Holahan, which was based in Los Angeles and specialized in entertainment law, winning several high profile cases.

== Personal life ==
He has two children from his first marriage to Wylie O'Hara (daughter of the author John O'Hara; 1966–1972), and seven grandchildren. Holahan was married to actress Loretta Swit from 1983 to 1995. They did not have children. They met when he appeared in M*A*S*H in Season 11, Episode 10 as a Swedish UN delegate.

Holahan is active in drug and alcohol recovery and has served on the board of McIntyre House, a non-profit recovery house for men recovering from alcoholism and drug addiction located in Los Angeles. Holahan also has served on the board of Worth Our Weight, a non-profit organization in Santa Rosa, California, which trains and educates teenagers and young adults who have survived foster care programs and teaches them how to work in the fine dining industry.

== Filmography ==
=== Films ===
Year	Title	Role	Notes
1980	Haywire	Bill II	Television
1981	Halloween II	Morgan Strode	
1983	Scarface	Jerry, The Banker	
1984	The Vegas Strip War	Jimmy Weldstrom	Television
1986	The Fifth Missile	Warden	Television
1986	Hyper Sapien: People from Another Star	Aric	
1988	Wildfire	Mitch	
1989	Collision Course	Derek Jarryd	
1990	Menu for Murder	Steve Mann	Television
1991	Rich Girl	Lawyer	
1992	Kuffs	Dr. Will Carlton	
1993	Aspen Extreme	Henri	
1995	3 Ninjas Knuckle Up	EPA Man	

=== Television ===
Year	Title	Role	No. of episodes
1978	Lou Grant	Jack Patterson	1 episode
1978	The Hardy Boys/Nancy Drew Mysteries	Arthur Philips	1 episode
1978–1979	The Incredible Hulk	Art Philbin	2 episodes
1979	The Rockford Files	Agent Kaiser	1 episode
1980	Beyond Westworld	Captain Farrell	1 episode
1980–1983	Dallas	George Walker	2 episodes
1981	The Dukes of Hazzard	Harry Joe	1 episode
1981	The White Shadow	Ed Barter	1 episode
1981	Hill Street Blues	Councilman Tom McAurley	2 episodes
1982	CHiPs	Fred	1 episode
1983	M*A*S*H*	Per Johannsen	1 episode
1983	Alice	Rob	1 episode
1983	The Fall Guy	Usher	1 episode
1984	Blue Thunder	Richard J. Lassiter	1 episode
1984	Who's the Boss?	Grant Paxton	1 episode
1984	The Love Boat	Leonard Ross	2 episodes
1985	1st & Ten	Unknown	1 episode
1987	Private Eye	Michael Cornell	1 episode
1988	High Mountain Rangers	Mallory	1 episode
1991	Married... with Children	Man #1	1 episode
1991	Top of the Heap	Man #1	1 episode
