= Wende Wagner =

American actress (1941–1997)

- Wagner in The Green Hornet, 1966
- Born: December 6, 1941; New London, Connecticut, U.S.
- Died: February 26, 1997 (aged 55); Santa Monica, California, U.S.
- Years active: 1960–1973
- Spouse(s): Courtney Brown (1960–?) (divorced) James Mitchum (m. 1967; div. 1978)
- Children: 2

Wende Wagner, also known as Wendy Wagner, (December 6, 1941 – February 26, 1997) was an American actress known for her roles in The Green Hornet and Rio Conchos.

== Life and career ==
Wagner was born to John H. Wagner, a U.S. Navy commander and swimming and diving coach, and Rudy Arnold Wagner, a champion skier. Wagner grew up on Coronado Island in California.

While Hollywood director Billy Wilder was filming Some Like It Hot (1959) on the Coronado beaches, he saw Wagner swimming and offered her a screen test. Her parents forbade it until she completed her senior year at Coronado High School. After graduating, she did a screen test, but turned down a role in Wilder's The Apartment (1960).

Wagner travelled the world as a fashion model, then made her television debut in an episode of Wagon Train in 1959. While living in the Bahamas, she became an underwater stunt double in the series Sea Hunt and The Aquanauts.

She married fellow underwater expert Courtney Brown, whom she had met while working on the shows. After giving birth to their daughter Tiffany, she divorced Brown and became contracted to 20th Century Fox. Her film career included roles in Rio Conchos (1964), Out of Sight (1966), Destination Inner Space (1966), A Covenant with Death (1967), Rosemary's Baby (1968) and Guns of the Magnificent Seven (1969). She married and divorced actor James Mitchum, son of Robert Mitchum. Wagner was also friends with Sharon Tate, and the two shared an apartment for a while.

In 1965, she appeared on Perry Mason as defendant Anona Gilbert in "The Case of the Feather Cloak". Wagner also made guest appearances in other television shows including Flipper, Lassie, Mannix, and The Rookies. During 1966–67, she had a regular role as Lenore "Casey" Case, the secretary to Britt Reid, on The Green Hornet.

== Death ==
Wagner died of cancer on February 26, 1997 at the age of 55. Her body was cremated, and her ashes were scattered in the Pacific Ocean.

== Filmography ==
Year	Title	Role	Notes
1964	Rio Conchos	Sally	
1966	Destination Inner Space	Sandra Welles	
1966	Out of Sight	Scuba	
1966–1967	The Green Hornet	Lenore Case	Main role
1967	A Covenant with Death	Rafaela Montemayor	
1968	Rosemary's Baby	Tiger, Rosemary's Girl Friend	
1969	Guns of the Magnificent Seven	Tina	
