= The Vegas Strip War =

- DVD artwork
- Genre: Drama
- Written by: George Englund
- Directed by: George Englund
- Starring: Rock Hudson; Sharon Stone; James Earl Jones; Pat Morita; Madison Mason; Robert Costanzo; Dennis Holahan
- Music by: Jimmie Haskell
- Country of origin: United States
- Original language: English

Production
- Executive producer: George Englund
- Producer: Michael Greenburg
- Production location: Las Vegas
- Cinematography: Fred J. Koenekamp
- Editors: Gary Griffen; William J. Waters
- Running time: 96 minutes
- Production company: George Englund Productions

Original release
- Network: NBC
- Release: November 25, 1984

The Vegas Strip Wars (also called The Las Vegas Strip Wars) is a 1984 American TV movie directed by George Englund and starring Rock Hudson, Sharon Stone, James Earl Jones and Pat Morita.

== Plot ==
A charming Las Vegas hotel owner named Neil Chaine gets fired by his superiors from the hotel-casino where he operates. Determined to seek revenge on his former employers in a subtle way, Chaine uses his severance pay to purchase a decaying casino next door to his former hotel to turn it into the Strip's top attraction. Help for Chaine comes from an assortment of people who include Sarah Shipman a young casino hostess who tries to help him gain a gambling license, as well as Jack Madrid a flamboyant sports promoter who is asked to hold a boxing match at Chaine's hotel, while Madrid may or may not be on Chaine's side... depending on where the money should be.

Toward the end when Chaine's new hotel looks like it will be closed down because of various debts having rung up during his opening of the place, he decides to settle his debts by playing high-stakes roulette and craps at his former partners hotel to get the money the honest way and not through various and less-than-legal means.

== Cast ==
- Rock Hudson as Neil Chaine
- Sharon Stone as Sarah Shipman
- Madison Mason as Gray Ryan
- Robert Costanzo as Stan Markham
- Dennis Holahan as Jimmy Weldstrom
- Robin Gammell as Marvin Berman
- Tony Russel as Morgan Steinman
- Pat Morita as Yip Tak
- James Earl Jones as Jack Madrid
- Bryan Englund as Garland
- Chadda Battrell as Jacqueline Neiger
- Rick Wagner as Josh Mallory
- J. Carlton Adair as Minton
- Jan Elise Donaldson as Helen
- Brandy Ray as Ruth
- George Englund Jr. as Alcatraz ranger
- Bonnie Graves as Chaine's secretary
- Ray Scarlata as Desert Inn pit boss
- Jim Harrington as stick man
- Don M. Guolielmino as executive
- Morgan Englund as parking boy
- Phillip Brown as Sweetwater Jackson
- Bernie Allen as Baccarat pit boss
- Russell G. Scott as pit boss
- Larry Dibbs as customer

== Production ==
The Vegas Strip War, known as The Las Vegas Strip Wars before it premiered, was produced by Michael Greenburg, and executive produced by George Englund, who also wrote the script and directed the film. George Englund, Jr. served as associate producer. Jimmie Haskell composed the music. Fred J. Koenekamp handled the cinematography with editing by Gary Griffen and William J. Waters. Trevor Williams designed the production.

During the course of the film, Greenburg and Stone were married.

== Release ==
The film premiered on NBC on November 25, 1984. It was released on VHS by Live Home Video. It was also released on Betamax. When released on DVD, the film's name changed to The Vegas Casino War.
