= Edward Donno =

American stunt performer

- Publicity Photo of Edward Donno
- Born: July 24, 1935
- Died: October 19, 2014 (aged 79)

Edward Donno (July 24, 1935 – October 19, 2014) was an American actor and stunt performer with a career that spanned almost 50 years.

Born in Philadelphia, Pennsylvania, Donno was originally a singer before traveling to Texas in the 1960s to visit a friend on the set of The Alamo, where he acquired a role as an extra. He was befriended by John Wayne in the process, and went on to do stunts on several of his films, including McLintock! and The Green Berets.

Donno performed stunts in for many films and TV show, including the films Scarface, Beverly Hills Cop, The Untouchables, Die Hard 2, Point Break, The Rock, Godzilla, Daredevil and The 40-Year-Old Virgin, as well as the TV shows The A-Team, 24, Supernatural, Californication and the Star Trek movies The Wrath of Khan, The Search for Spock and First Contact. He was John Belushi's stunt double for The Blues Brothers.

Donno died on October 19, 2014.

== Filmography ==
As an actor.

Year	Title	Role	Notes
1966	The Last of the Secret Agents?	Slate Boy	Uncredited
1968	The Savage Seven	Fat Jack	
1968	The Green Berets	Sgt. Watson	
1970	Chisum	Cass	
1971	The Last Movie	Stuntman	
1973	Kid Blue	Huey	
1974	Freebie and the Bean	Bag Man	
1975	Cleopatra Jones and the Casino of Gold	Morgan	
1975	The Killer Elite	Fake Officer	
1976	The Gumball Rally	Mel - Van Team	
1977	Ruby	Jess	
1980	Hide in Plain Sight	Man at Party	
1980	The Blues Brothers	SWAT Team Commander	
1982	I'm Dancing as Fast as I Can	Orderly #1	
1982	The Beastmaster	Jun Priest	
1983	Tiger Man		
1983	Twilight Zone: The Movie	K.K.K. #1	(segment "Time Out")
1983	The Osterman Weekend	Agent #3	
1984	Love Streams	Stepfather Swanson	
1985	Into the Night	L.A.P.D	
1986	Invaders from Mars	Hollis	
1987	Beverly Hills Cop II	Armored Van Chase Sedan Driver	Uncredited
1987	The Untouchables	Capone's hitman at the border	Uncredited
1988	Grotesque	Director	
1992	Rapid Fire	Grey-Haired Man at Serrano's Place	Uncredited
1996	Santa with Muscles	Mr. Rapini	
1999	Blue Streak	Guard #1	
2002	Sweet Home Alabama	Model	
2009	From Mexico with Love	Ring announcer	Uncredited, (final film role)
