= Signpost to Murder =

1965 film by George Englund

- Theatrical release poster
- Directed by: George Englund
- Screenplay by: Sally Benson
- Based on: Signpost to Murder; 1962 play by Monte Doyle
- Produced by: Lawrence Weingarten
- Starring: Joanne Woodward; Stuart Whitman; Edward Mulhare
- Cinematography: Paul C. Vogel
- Edited by: John McSweeney Jr.
- Music by: Lyn Murray
- Production company: Marten Pictures
- Distributed by: Metro-Goldwyn-Mayer
- Release dates: December 4, 1964 (West Germany); May 19, 1965 (New York City)
- Running time: 78 minutes
- Country: United States
- Language: English

Signpost to Murder is a 1964 American crime thriller film directed by George Englund from a screenplay by Sally Benson, based on the 1962 play of the same name by Monte Doyle. The film stars Joanne Woodward, Stuart Whitman, and Edward Mulhare. It was released on May 19, 1965 in New York City, by Metro-Goldwyn-Mayer.

== Plot ==
A man, on the run after killing his wife, takes refuge in the house of a woman who is hiding dark secrets of her own. Soon, her husband is murdered and she is falsely accused of the crime while the murderer escapes from police.

== Cast ==
- Joanne Woodward as Molly Thomas
- Stuart Whitman as Alex Forrester
- Edward Mulhare as Dr. Mark Fleming
- Alan Napier as The Vicar
- Joyce Worsley as Mrs. Barnes
- Leslie Denison as Superintendent Bickley
- Murray Matheson as Dr. Graham
- Hedley Mattingly as Police Constable Mort Rogers
- Carol Veazie as Auntie

== Remake ==
Yash Chopra and B R Chopra remade it in India as the 1969 Hindi film Ittefaq starring Rajesh Khanna and Nanda. B R Chopra's grandson, Abhay Chopra, remade it in India as the 2017 Hindi film Ittefaq starring Akshaye Khanna, Sidharth Malhotra and Sonakshi Sinha.

== See also ==
- List of American films of 1965
