= Revenge! =

1971 film directed by Jud Taylor

- Genre: Horror; Thriller
- Based on: There Was an Old Woman by Lou Ellen Davis
- Written by: Joseph Stefano
- Directed by: Jud Taylor
- Starring: Shelley Winters; Bradford Dillman; Stuart Whitman; Roger Perry
- Music by: Dominic Frontiere
- Country of origin: United States
- Original language: English

Production
- Producer: Mark Carliner
- Cinematography: John A. Alonzo
- Editor: John F. Link
- Running time: 75 minutes
- Production company: Mark Carliner Productions

Original release
- Network: ABC
- Release: November 6, 1971

Revenge! is a 1971 American made-for-television horror-thriller film directed by Jud Taylor and starring Shelley Winters, Bradford Dillman and Stuart Whitman. The film premiered as the ABC Movie of the Week on November 6, 1971.

== Plot ==
Shelley Winters stars as Amanda Hilton, a deranged and vengeful mother who imprisons in a cage in her basement the man (Bradford Dillman) she believes is responsible for the seduction and suicide of her daughter. She tortures him mercilessly in her hostile revenge.

== Cast ==
Actors	Characters
Shelley Winters	Amanda Hilton
Bradford Dillman	Frank Klaner
Stuart Whitman	Mark Hembric
Roger Perry	Pete Marsh
Carol Eve Rossen	Dianne Klaner
Gary Clarke	Ed Linnis
Leslie Charleson	Nancy Grover
Johnny Scott Lee	Jimmy Klaner
George Burrafato	Delivery Man
Pelly Sutton	Mrs. James Lazen
