= The Mark (1961 film) =

1961 film directed by Guy Green

- Home video cover
- Directed by: Guy Green
- Written by: Sidney Buchman; Stanley Mann
- Based on: The Mark (1951 novel) by Charles E. Israel
- Produced by: Raymond Stross
- Starring: Maria Schell; Stuart Whitman; Rod Steiger
- Cinematography: Douglas Slocombe
- Edited by: Peter Taylor
- Music by: Richard Rodney Bennett
- Production company: Raymond Stross Productions
- Distributed by: 20th Century Fox
- Release date: 26 January 1961 (London)
- Running time: 127 minutes
- Country: United Kingdom
- Language: English
- Budget: £260,000

The Mark is a 1961 British drama film directed by Guy Green, produced by Raymond Stross, and starring Stuart Whitman, Maria Schell, Rod Steiger and Brenda De Banzie. It is adapted by Sidney Buchman and Stanley Mann from a 1951 novel by American writer Charles E. Israel. The film concerns a convicted sex offender trying to rebuild his life after a prison sentence (Whitman), but is suspected in the sexual assault of a child.

The film's controversial subject matter limited its commercial prospects, though it was generally well-received by critics. It was nominated for the Palme d'Or at the 1961 Cannes Film Festival, and Stuart Whitman was nominated for an Academy Award for Best Actor.

== Plot ==
Jim Fuller is released from prison after serving time for intent to commit child molestation. He attempts to return to society while dealing with his psychological demons with the help of psychiatrist Dr. McNally.

After finding employment, Jim begins a romantic relationship with Ruth Leighton, the company's secretary, and he appears to be on the way to a better life. However, when a child is reported as a possible abuse victim, Jim is picked up for questioning by the police. He has a genuine alibi, and is eventually cleared, but a tabloid reporter exposes Jim's previous conviction, and he becomes a pariah in his new community.

== Cast ==
- Stuart Whitman as Jim Fuller
- Rod Steiger as Dr. Edmund McNally
- Maria Schell as Ruth Leighton
- Brenda de Banzie as Gertrude Cartwright
- Donald Houston as Austin
- Donald Wolfit as Andrew Clive
- Paul Rogers as Roy Milne
- Maurice Denham as Arnold Cartwright
- Amanda Black as Janie Leighton
- Bandana Das Gupta as Inez
- Eddie Byrne as Akers
- Harry Baird as Cole
- Al Mulock as Convict
- John Welsh and Russell Napier as Plainclothes officers

== Production ==
=== Casting ===
Each of the three main characters was played by an actor not originally slated for the role. Stuart Whitman was a last-minute replacement for Richard Burton; Maria Schell took over for Jean Simmons, who was supposed to have played Ruth; and the role of the prison psychiatrist was intended for Trevor Howard before Rod Steiger was cast.

According to an interview given by Steiger many years later, he had visited an analyst himself in the 1950s and observed how he conducted himself. He played McNally as an Irishman to avoid stereotyping and added touches to impart more humanity to the character. Steiger claimed that the portrayal was so well received by psychiatric professionals that he was invited to speak at a convention by a psychiatric society.

=== Filming ===
Though a British production, the film's controversial subject matter led principal photography to take place in Ireland. Shooting at Ardmore Studios.

== Release ==
John Davis of the Rank Organisation refused to allow the film to be shown in Rank's cinemas saying "I have seen it and disliked it intensely."

The Mark premiered in London on 26 January 1961 at 20th Century Fox's Carlton Theatre in Haymarket, London and opened in New York City that October. It was screened in-competition at the 1961 Cannes Film Festival.

== Reception ==
=== Critical response ===
The film's subject matter made it controversial, and it was criticised for making a paedophile too sympathetic. However, it also received favourable reviews for its treatment of a difficult subject and praise for the acting, writing and directing. Green said the film was highly regarded in Hollywood, as was his previous film, The Angry Silence (1960), and led to Hollywood offers such as Light in the Piazza (1962).

The Monthly Film Bulletin wrote: "This film makes a brave attempt at portraying abnormality sensibly, but gets no further. There is seriousness and care (always excepting such unconvincing episodes as Fuller's psychiatric treatment in prison, and the newspaper-man's extraordinarily irresponsible libel), but neither boldness nor passion. Too many issues are soft-pedalled. ... Glamorous stars and expensive settings are altogether too obvious an edulcoration. There is, admittedly, much competent acting: Donald Wolfit is sound and solid as Clive, Paul Rogers convincing as the shifty executive assistant, Milne, and Donald Houston's journalist catches the eye. But the most compelling performance comes from Rod Steiger."

The Radio Times Guide to Films gave the film 3/5 stars, writing: "Pitched as a rather sentimentalised melodrama, this is still an unusually frank and adult treatment of a serious topic, set in Britain but performed by two major Hollywood stars."

Variety wrote: "Producer Raymond Stross in the past has made a number of pix which have tended to rough up sex in equal mixtures of naivete and sleaziness. With The Mark, Stross still clings to an undeniable belief in sex as an ingredient that interests adult filmgoers. But, this time, he's set his sights higher. Result is an overlong, sometimes plodding, but honest, interesting glimpse at a sex dilemma. ... There are one or two obvious flaws in the story line and some of the flashbacks are irritating. But quietly it makes engrossing impact."

=== Awards and nominations ===
Institution	Year	Category	Nominee	Result	Ref.
Academy Awards	1962	Best Actor	Stuart Whitman	Nominated	
Cannes Film Festival	1961	Palme d'Or	Guy Green	Nominated	
Golden Globe Awards	1962	Samuel Goldwyn International Award (Note: This was not the predecessor but rather a companion award to the Golden Globe Award for Best Foreign Language Film and Golden Globe Award for Best English-Language Foreign Film categories.)	—N/a	Won	
