= Deadly Intruder =

Death Screams aka The Deadly Intruder
- Directed by: John McCauley
- Written by: Tony Crupi
- Produced by: Bruce R. Cook
- Starring: Danny Bonaduce; Stuart Whitman; Daniel Greene
- Cinematography: Tom Jewett(as Thomas Jewett)
- Music by: John McCauley
- Distributed by: Channel One Productions/Thorn EMI/Home Box Office Home Video (HBO)
- Release date: 1985
- Running time: 86 minutes
- Country: United States
- Language: English

Deadly Intruder (aka The Deadly Intruder) is a 1985 horror film.

== Plot ==
In a place called Midvale, a sanitarium patient escapes after dispatching security specialists there and heads off to looking for the love of his life. The disturbed individual is obsessively jealous, slaying anyone whom he fears may be endangering his relationship with his girlfriend.

== Cast ==
- Molly Cheek as Jessie
- David Schroeder as Grotowski
- Danny Bonaduce as John
- Stuart Whitman as Captain Pritchett
- Daniel Greene as Danny
- Santos Morales as Carlos
- Steve Perry as Wayne
- Chris Holder as Bob
- Laura Melton as Amy
- Marcy Hansen as Cathy
- Curt Bryant as Jim
- Stephen Paul as Rogers
- Todd Martin as Mr. West
- Tommy Ramone (as Tommy Reamon) as Foreman
- W.T. Zacha as Mechanic
- Tony Crupi as Drifter
- Kay St. Germain Wells as Neighbor
- Suzanne Benoit as Salesgirl
- Gerry Landrum as Lineman

== Release ==
The film was released in Finland as Murhaaja saapuu öisin and in West Germany as Der Tödliche Feind.

== See also ==
- Exploitation film
- Horror-of-personality
- Slasher films
- Splatter
