= Cuba Crossing =

- VHS cover art
- Directed by: Chuck Workman
- Written by: Chuck Workman; Robin Swicord
- Story by: Peter Barton; Robin Swicord
- Produced by: Peter J. Barton; Wolfgang Bellenbaum; Dean Heyde; Jack White
- Starring: Stuart Whitman; Robert Vaughn; Woody Strode; Albert Salmi; Michael Gazzo
- Cinematography: Robert Carras
- Edited by: James Symons
- Music by: Jack White
- Distributed by: Troma Entertainment
- Release date: February 23, 1980
- Running time: 92 minutes
- Language: English
- Budget: $1.5 million

Cuba Crossing, also known as Assignment: Kill Castro, Kill Castro, and Sweet Dirty Tony, is a 1980 German/American international co-production action film directed by Chuck Workman and distributed by Troma Entertainment. It was produced by Wolfgang Bellenbaum and Jack White and stars Stuart Whitman, Robert Vaughn, Woody Strode, Albert Salmi, Sybil Danning, Michael Gazzo, and White's then wife Marie-Louise Gassen.

== Plot ==
Hud is an American who survived the Bay of Pigs Invasion and has sworn revenge against Fidel Castro. Many years later, he gets his chance when he is engaged by Mr Rossellini, who blames Castro for his losses when his gambling enterprises and he had to leave Cuba, and the mysterious Mr. Bell, who finances Hud for a mission to Cuba. Hud plans to bring a father-and-son pair of sharpshooters to kill Castro when he stays at a hotel on the Isla de Pinos. Through Rossellini, Hud hires bar owner and ship's captain Tony to bring his men ashore, but the enterprise is fraught with betrayal.

== Cast ==
- Stuart Whitman as Tony
- Robert Vaughn as Hud
- Woody Strode as Titi
- Albert Salmi as Delgato
- Michael Gazzo as Rossellini
- Marie-Louise Gassen as Maria
- Edward Bell as Michael
- Raymond St. Jacques as Mr. Bell
- Sybil Danning as Veronica
- Caren Kaye as Tracy
- Monti Rock the III as Man At Bar
- Bert Williams as 1st Marksman
- Sharon Thomas as Fred

== Production ==
Cuba Crossing was filmed in Key West, Florida. It was one of the last lead roles of Stuart Whitman.

== Release ==
Cuba Crossing was released February 23, 1980 in theatres in West Germany. The film was released on VHS on April 15, 1980. Cuba Crossing was released on DVD March 1, 2005, initially and recently on February 5, 2016.
