= The Pirate (1978 film) =

1978 television film by Ken Annakin

- Genre: Drama
- Based on: The Pirate by Harold Robbins
- Written by: Julius J. Epstein
- Directed by: Ken Annakin
- Starring: Franco Nero
- Theme music composer: Bill Conti
- Country of origin: United States
- Original language: English

Production
- Executive producer: Paul Picard
- Producer: Howard W. Koch
- Cinematography: Roland 'Ozzie' Smith
- Editors: Howard Epstein; Russell Livingstone
- Running time: 240 min.
- Production companies: Howard W. Koch Productions; Warner Bros. Television

Original release
- Network: CBS
- Release: November 21 – November 22, 1978

The Pirate is a 1978 American two-part, four-hour television miniseries directed by Ken Annakin. It is based on the 1974 novel with the same title written by Harold Robbins. It was broadcast in two parts by CBS on November 21–22, 1978.

== Plot ==
Baydr Al Fay, a man raised by wealthy and powerful Arab parents, is put in charge of his country's vast oil fortunes; only to discover he was born to Jewish birth parents. He then comes into conflict with a terrorist group headed by his own daughter Leila.

== Cast ==
- Franco Nero as Baydr Al Fay
- Anne Archer as Jordana Mason
- Olivia Hussey as Leila Al Fay
- Ian McShane as Rashid
- Christopher Lee as Samir Al Fay
- Michael Constantine as Yashir
- James Franciscus as Dick Carriage
- Armand Assante as Ahmed
- Stuart Whitman as Terry Sullivan
- Eli Wallach as Ben Ezra
- Carol Bagdasarian as Maryam Al Fay
- Jeff Corey as Prince Feiyad
- Marjorie Lord as Mrs. Mason
- Ferdy Mayne as Jabir
- Michael Pataki as General Eshnev
- Murray Salem as Ramadan
- Dimitra Arliss as Nabilia
- Leo Rossi as Shadin

== See also ==
- List of American films of 1978
