= The Day and the Hour =

- Directed by: René Clément
- Written by: René Clément; Roger Vailland; Andre Barret
- Produced by: Jacques Bar; Raymond Froment
- Starring: Simone Signoret; Stuart Whitman
- Cinematography: Henri Decaë
- Edited by: Fedora Zincone
- Music by: Claude Bolling
- Production companies: Cipra Films; Compagnia Cinématografica Mondiale
- Distributed by: Metro Goldwyn Mayer
- Release dates: 1963 (France); 19 February 1964 (United States)
- Running time: 110 minutes
- Countries: France; Italy
- Languages: French; English

The Day and the Hour (French: Le jour et l'heure) is a 1963 French war-time drama film directed by René Clément and starring Simone Signoret and Stuart Whitman.

== Plot ==
During the Nazi occupation, an American pilot named Allan Morley meets Thérèse Dutheil, a Parisian woman whose husband is a prisoner in Germany. It's May 1944, and the Gestapo is hunting down Allied soldiers whose plane was shot down. When Thérèse unwittingly gets involved in helping transport the aviators secretly, she and Allan end up traveling together to Toulouse to evade Gestapo capture. Despite their involuntary journey, a romance sparks between them. However, the Resistance separates them in the Pyrenees, sending Allan to Spain so he can rejoin his unit in England. After a heartbreaking goodbye, news of the Allied invasion arrives. What lies ahead for them once the war is over?

== Cast ==
- Simone Signoret as Therese Dutheil
- Stuart Whitman as Captain Allan Morley
- Geneviève Page as Agathe Dutheil
- Michel Piccoli as Antoine
- Reggie Nalder as Le gestapiste
- Billy Kearns as Pat Riley
- Marcel Bozzuffi as Inspector Lerat
- Henri Virlogeux as Legendre
- Pierre Dux as Inspector Marboz
