= Run, Cougar, Run =

1972 American drama film directed by Jerome Courtland

- Theatrical release poster
- Directed by: Jerome Courtland
- Screenplay by: Louis Pelletier
- Based on: The Mountain Lion by Robert William Murphy
- Produced by: James Algar
- Starring: Stuart Whitman; Frank Aletter; Lonny Chapman; Douglas Fowley; Harry Carey Jr. Alfonso Arau
- Narrated by: Ian Tyson
- Cinematography: William Cronjager
- Edited by: Gordon D. Brenner
- Music by: Buddy Baker
- Production company: Walt Disney Productions
- Distributed by: Buena Vista Distribution
- Release date: October 18, 1972
- Running time: 87 minutes
- Country: United States
- Language: English

Run, Cougar, Run is a 1972 American Adventure film directed by Jerome Courtland and written by Louis Pelletier. The film stars Stuart Whitman, Frank Aletter, Lonny Chapman, Douglas Fowley, Harry Carey Jr. and Alfonso Arau. The film was released on October 18, 1972, by Buena Vista Distribution.

== Plot ==
Set in Utah, the film tells the story of a cougar whose mate has been killed by a hunter. She must raise her three cubs, teaching them to survive the harsh realities of the wilderness, while the hunter continues to track the animals with the intent to kill them.

== Cast ==
- Stuart Whitman as Hugh McRae
- Frank Aletter as Sam Davis
- Lonny Chapman as Harry Walker
- Douglas Fowley as Joe Bickley
- Harry Carey Jr. as Barney
- Alfonso Arau as Etio
- Ian Tyson as Narrator

== Production ==
Parts of the film were shot at Castle Valley, Arches, Seven mile Canyon, Dead Horse Point, and the La Sal Mountains in Utah.

== Music ==
The film's score was written by Buddy Baker. The film features one original song, "Let Her Alone", written by Terry Gilkyson. The song plays during the film's opening credits and is reprised at the film's conclusion.

== See also ==
- List of American films of 1972
