= Ruby (1977 film) =

1977 horror drama film directed by Curtis Harrington

- Theatrical poster
- Directed by: Curtis Harrington
- Written by: George Edwards; Steve Krantz; Barry Schneider
- Produced by: George Edwards; Steve Krantz
- Starring: Piper Laurie; Stuart Whitman; Roger Davis; Janit Baldwin
- Cinematography: William Mendenhall
- Edited by: William Magee
- Music by: Don Ellis
- Distributed by: Dimension Pictures
- Release date: June 29, 1977
- Running time: 85 minutes
- Country: United States
- Language: English
- Budget: $600,000
- Box office: $16 million or $2,233,128

Ruby is a 1977 American supernatural horror film directed by Curtis Harrington, and starring Piper Laurie, Stuart Whitman, and Roger Davis. Its plot follows a former gun moll in 1951 Florida who operates a drive-in theater, where bizarre supernatural occurrences begin to plague her staff of ex-mobsters as well as her mute daughter.

== Plot ==
In 1935 Florida, lowlife mobster Nicky Rocco is betrayed and executed in the swampy backwoods as his pregnant gun moll Ruby Claire watches. He swears vengeance with his dying breath, and then she suddenly goes into labor. Sixteen years later in 1951, Ruby is now running a drive-in theater in the backwoods near her home and employs ex-mobsters to run the theater. Her 16-year-old daughter, Leslie Claire, is mute and has been since birth, and she resides in the home with Ruby, her lover and henchman Vince, and Jake Miller, a blind, wheelchair-using former mobster who had his eyes cut out. Ruby spends her days overseeing the theater's operations and lamenting her short-lived career as a lounge singer.

One evening during a drive-in showing of Attack of the 50-Foot Woman, the projectionist Jess Littinger experiences poltergeist activity in the projection booth, and he then is found hanged. Ruby dismisses his death as a suicide and instructs Vince to get rid of his body. Meanwhile, Lila June, a patron at the theater, is given a necklace from Louie, a clerk at the concession stand, that he stole from Ruby. He attempts to rape Lila, but she flees. Louie is accosted by an invisible force in the woods that kills him. The following morning, Leslie and Vince find Louie's bloodied corpse hanging from a tree. Ruby fears that Nicky's spirit has returned to torment her, fearing he believes she lured him to his death.

At nightfall, Vince and Ruby take Louie's corpse to the swamp to dispose of it. Later, Vince is visited by Dr. Keller, a prison psychologist who helped Vince receive an early parole. Dr. Keller, who claims to be clairvoyant, investigates the property, and tells Vince that he senses the drive-in is being stalked by a supernatural presence. Vince and Dr. Keller arrive at the house to speak to Ruby about Dr. Keller's findings. Later, a drunken Ruby goes to the drive-in grounds to speak to Nicky, and she is confronted by the sound of his voice calling her name over the theater's sound system, followed by a series of violent apparitions.

In the middle of the night, Ruby is confronted by Leslie in the attic, who begins speaking in Nicky's voice. A violent struggle ensues, and Ruby knocks Leslie unconscious. Dr. Keller attempts to hypnotize Leslie after the incident. During the attempt, Ruby watches in horror as bullet holes appear in Leslie's head, the same as those that inflicted Nicky. Later, Dr. Keller and Ruby discuss Nicky's death, and while Ruby admits to having set up other mobsters, she was not responsible for Nicky's death. Suddenly, Jake appears in his wheelchair, stabbed to death. Ruby and Dr. Keller rush upstairs to Leslie's room and find her body contorted and her speaking in Nicky's voice.

Ruby goes downstairs while Dr. Keller attempts to calm Leslie and attempts to speak with Nicky. She unveils a jar containing Jake's preserved eyeballs, which she cut out herself, as proof of her dedication to Nicky. Dr. Keller phones Vince at the drive-in, urging him to leave as soon as possible. Moments later, Vince is confronted by Nicky's apparition, and a sudden burst of wind overtakes the drive-in. Meanwhile, Leslie, possessed by Nicky, attacks Dr. Keller. Vince manages to rush back to the house, but finds that Ruby has disappeared. Vince and Dr. Keller flee into the swamp, where they witness Ruby walking toward the water hand-in-hand with Nicky. Suddenly, Ruby screams as she is dragged underwater to her death by Nicky's skeleton.

== Cast ==
- Piper Laurie as Ruby Claire
- Stuart Whitman as Vince Kemper
- Roger Davis as Dr. Paul Keller
- Janit Baldwin as Leslie Claire
- Sal Vecchio as Nicky Rocco
- Paul Kent as Louie
- Len Lesser as Barney
- Crystin Sinclaire as Lila June
- Jack Perkins as Avery
- Eddy Donno as Jess Littinger
- Fred Kohler Jr. as Jake Miller
- Rory Stevens as Donny
- Raymond Kark as 1st Man
- Jan Burrell as 1st Woman
- Kip Gillespie as Herbie
- Tamar Cooper as S Woman
- Patricia Allison as Pickup Man's Wife
- Stu Olson as A Man
- Mary Margaret Robinson as Maybelline, Sheriff's Wife
- Michael Alldredge as Sheriff's Wife's Date

== Production ==
Principal photography of Ruby began in Los Angeles in September 1976. The film's working title was Blood Ruby.

The film playing in the drive-in, the cult classic Attack of the 50 Foot Woman, was released in 1958.

== Release ==
=== Box office ===
Ruby was released theatrically in the United States by Dimension Pictures in June 1977. During its opening weekend in Chicago, it grossed approximately $315,000. The film was overall a commercial success, eventually grossing a total of $16 million.

=== Home media ===
The film was long available on video in the U.S., only as a re-edited (and apparently re-shot by director Stephanie Rothman) version for television, which omitted the R-rated violence and adding new scenes with dialogue.

The DVD of Ruby was released on June 26, 2001, presented in its original theatrical version; however, it is not a director's cut: It contains Krantz's abrupt, horror ending rather than Harrington's intended romantic one. It is presented in widescreen but not anamorphic. The special features include the original theatrical trailer, motion menu, scene selection, commentary with Curtis Harrington and Piper Laurie, interview with Curtis Harrington, photo gallery, and Director's Theatrical Cut. However, this version is currently out of print. In 2017, Ruby was released as a Blu-ray/DVD combo pack with extra bonus features.

== Reception and legacy ==
Critical reception for Ruby has been negative with Time Out magazine stated that the film starts well, but was ruined by "cluttered art direction", "nostalgic flashbacks", and predictability while Variety gave the film a negative review, noting the film's promising start, but felt that it was bogged down by poor performances from the film's cast. On the review aggregator website Rotten Tomatoes, 57% of 7 critics' reviews are positive, with an average rating of 7.0/10.

It was parodied by RiffTrax on August 19, 2016.
