= Las Vegas Lady =

1975 film

- Theatrical release poster
- Directed by: Noel Nosseck
- Written by: Walter Dallenbach
- Produced by: Joel B. Michaels; Noel Nosseck; Gene Slott; Joseph Zappala
- Starring: Stella Stevens; Stuart Whitman; George DiCenzo; Lynne Moody; Linda Scruggs; Andrew Stevens; Joseph Della Sorte
- Cinematography: Stephen M. Katz
- Edited by: Robert Gordon
- Music by: Alan Silvestri
- Production companies: Crown International Pictures; Zappala & Slott Productions
- Distributed by: Crown International Pictures
- Release date: June 1, 1975
- Running time: 87 minutes
- Country: United States
- Language: English

Las Vegas Lady is a 1975 American crime film directed by Noel Nosseck, and starring Stella Stevens, Stuart Whitman, George DiCenzo, Lynne Moody, Linda Scruggs, Joseph Della Sorte, Hank Robinson, and Karl Lukas. In this heist film Stella Stevens stars as a thief who enlists her friends – a trapeze artist and a magician's aide – to help her make off with $500,000 in casino cash. The film was released by Crown International Pictures on June 1, 1975.

== Plot ==
In Las Vegas, Lucky and two of her girlfriends, Carol and Lisa, plan to steal half a million dollars from the sadistic manager of the Circus Circus Casino. A shadowy man is their contact and organizer. Each of the women could be a weak link in a scheme that has to be flawless: Lucky's boyfriend is a security officer at the casino, Lisa is a trapeze artist who's now plagued with vertigo, and Carol is in debt to a nasty thug – plus, as a Black woman, she's subject to additional harassment.

== Cast ==
- Stella Stevens as Lucky
- Stuart Whitman as Vic
- George DiCenzo as Eversull
- Lynne Moody as Carol
- Linda Scruggs as Lisa
- Joseph Della Sorte as A.C.
- Hank Robinson as Tully
- Karl Lukas as Connors
- Emilia Dallenbach as Goldie
- Andrew Stevens as Denny
- Max Starky as Mr. Cramer
- Frank Bonner as Claude
- Walter Smith as Milt
- Jack Gordon as Melendez
- Stephanie Faulkner as Judy
- Tony Bill as Bob
- Jesse White as Big Jake
