= George Englund =

American film editor and director

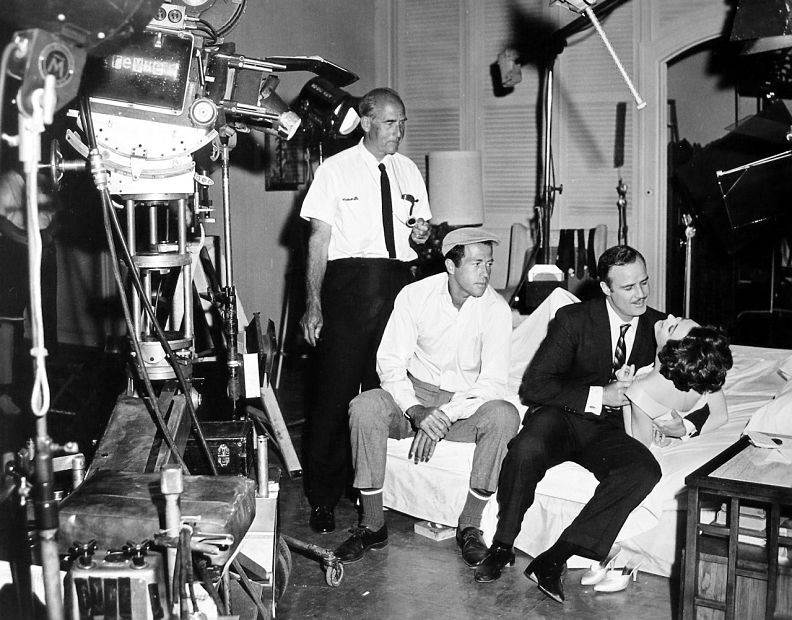
- On the set of The Ugly American (1963), from left: cinematographer Clifford Stine, George Englund, Marlon Brando and Sandra Church
- Born: George Howe Ripley; June 22, 1926; Washington, D.C., U.S.
- Died: September 14, 2017 (aged 91); Palm Springs, California, U.S.
- Occupations: Film editor; director; producer; screenwriter
- Spouses: Cloris Leachman (m. 1953; div. 1978) Bonnie Graves (m. 1980; div. 1992)
- Children: 7
- Mother: Mabel Albertson
- Relatives: Jack Albertson (uncle); Anabel Englund (granddaughter)

George Englund (born George Howe Ripley; June 22, 1926 – September 14, 2017) was an American film editor, director, producer, and actor.

== Biography ==
Englund was born George Howe Ripley on June 22, 1926, in Washington, D.C., the son of actress Mabel Albertson and Harold Austin Ripley. His mother was Jewish. His uncle was actor Jack Albertson. After his parents divorced, his mother married Ken Englund, whose surname young George adopted.

Englund was married to actress Cloris Leachman from 1953 to 1978. They had five children: Adam, Bryan (1955-1986), George, Jr., Morgan, and Dinah. While he was married to Leachman he had an affair with actress Joan Collins, which was confirmed by Leachman. "He was very handsome, very urbane, incredibly witty. Fascinating. And eight years older than me," Collins said.

On April 10, 1980, he married actress Bonnie Graves. They had two children: Graves and Max (1982-1994). The couple divorced in 1992. For the last ten years of his life, his companion was Frances Bowes, art collector, patron, and vice-chair lady at Dia Center for the Arts. Max Englund died from complications from spinal muscular atrophy (SMA), a genetic disorder that starts in the central nervous system (CNS) and affects all the muscles in the body.

He was best friends with Marlon Brando, who starred in Englund's 1963 film The Ugly American. Englund wrote The Way It's Never Been Done Before: My Friendship with Marlon Brando, a memoir about their friendship.

== Selected directorial filmography ==
- The Ugly American (1963)
- Signpost to Murder (1965)
- Zachariah (1971)
- Snow Job (1972)
- A Christmas to Remember (1978, TV movie)
- The Vegas Strip War (1984, TV movie)

== Death ==
Englund moved to Palm Springs, California in 1997, and lived there for the remainder of his life. He died at his home on September 14, 2017, at the age of 91, following a fall. His body was cremated.
