= Captain Apache =

1971 film by Alexander Singer

- Theatrical release poster
- Directed by: Alexander Singer
- Screenplay by: Milton Sperling; Philip Yordan
- Based on: The novel Captain Apache by S.E. Whitman
- Produced by: Milton Sperling; Philip Yordan
- Starring: Lee Van Cleef; Carroll Baker; Stuart Whitman
- Cinematography: John Cabrera
- Edited by: Leigh G. Tallas
- Music by: Dolores Claman
- Distributed by: Scotia International
- Release date: 27 October 1971 (U.S.)
- Running time: 94 minutes
- Countries: Spain; United Kingdom
- Language: English

Captain Apache is a 1971 Spanish-British acid Western film directed by Alexander Singer and starring Lee Van Cleef, Carroll Baker, and Stuart Whitman. It was written and produced by Milton Sperling and Philip Yordan. The film was based on the 1965 novel Captain Apache by Sidney Edgerton Whitman, a prolific writer of Western fiction. The vocals of the opening and credits song were written by Dolores Claman and performed by Van Cleef.

== Synopsis ==
Captain Apache is a Native American U.S. Cavalry officer, who finds himself tangled into a conspiracy, and proceeding upon the case of solving the enigma of the last words of a dead commissioner (and captain's old friend), which were: "April morning". Each time he nears discovering the meaning of the phrase, a character that can help him solve the mystery dies. His journey eventually takes him to a train, that contains a private railroad car named April Morning, transporting President Ulysses S. Grant.

Captain Apache pieces the information together. He realizes an assassination of the President is planned and he is the only one who can prevent it.

== Cast ==
- Lee Van Cleef as Captain Apache
- Carroll Baker as Maude
- Stuart Whitman as Griffin
- Percy Herbert as Moon
- Elisa Montés as Rosita
- Charly Bravo as Sanchez
- Charles Stal Maker as O'Rourke
- Tony Vogel as Snake
- Faith Clift as Abigail
- Dee Pollock as Ben
- Dan van Husen as Al
- Hugh McDermott as General Ryland
- Elsa Zabala as Witch

== Release ==
Captain Apache was also released under these titles: Capitán Apache (Spain), Deathwork (U.S.A.), The Guns of April Morning (U.K.), Capitan Apache (Italy), Kapteeni Apassi (Finland), Pääpiru (Finland), O Keravnos ton Apache (Greece), and Hunt the Man Down.

== Critical reception ==
PopMatters, "An incredibly fun if cheesy film."
