= The Comancheros (film) =

1961 film by Michael Curtiz

- Theatrical poster
- Directed by: Michael Curtiz; John Wayne (Note: uncredited)
- Screenplay by: James Edward Grant; Clair Huffaker
- Based on: The Comancheros; 1952 novel by Paul I. Wellman
- Produced by: George Sherman
- Starring: John Wayne; Stuart Whitman; Ina Balin; Nehemiah Persoff; Lee Marvin
- Cinematography: William H. Clothier
- Edited by: Louis Loeffler
- Music by: Elmer Bernstein
- Color process: Color by Deluxe
- Production company: 20th Century-Fox
- Distributed by: 20th Century-Fox
- Release date: November 1, 1961
- Running time: 107 minutes
- Country: United States
- Language: English
- Budget: $4,260,000
- Box office: $3,500,000

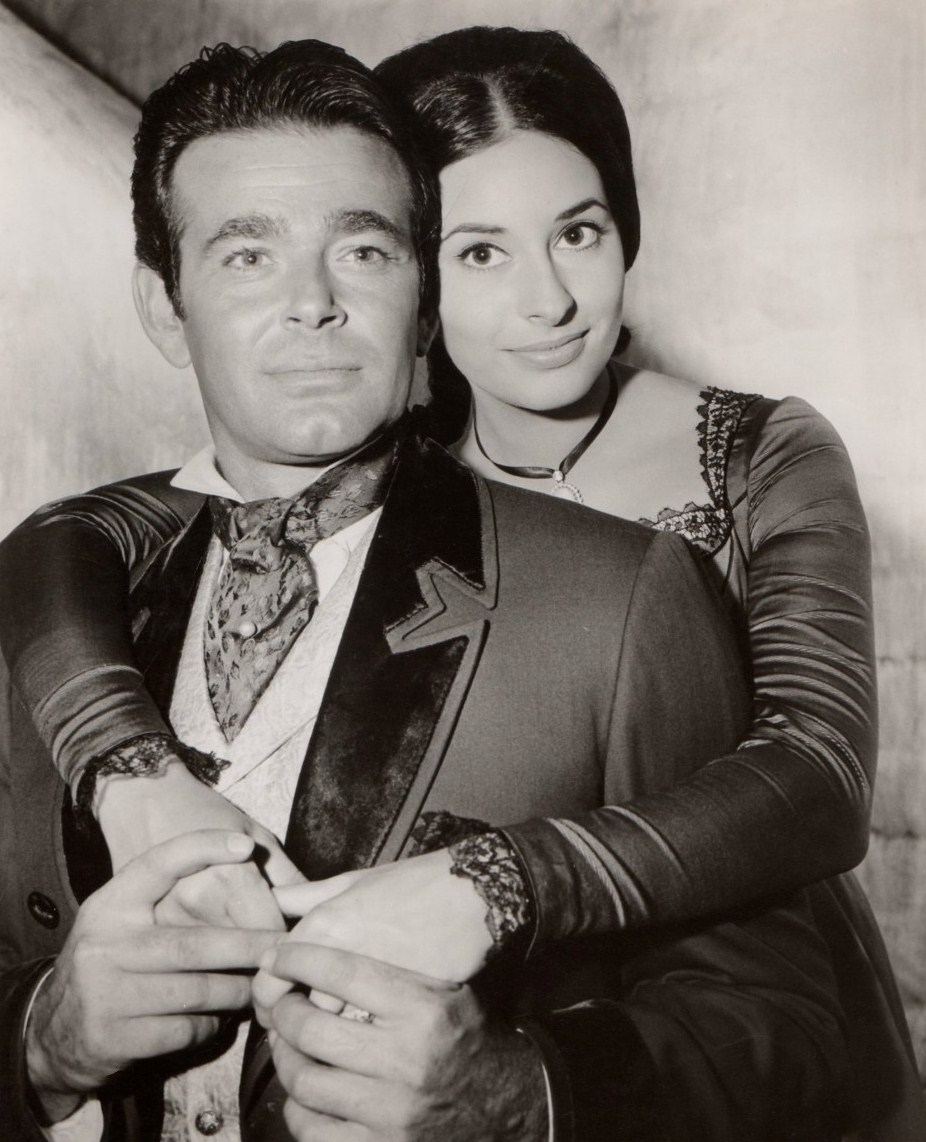
Stuart Whitman and Ina Balin

The Comancheros is a 1961 American CinemaScope Western film directed by Michael Curtiz, based on a 1952 novel of the same name by Paul Wellman, and starring John Wayne and Stuart Whitman. The supporting cast includes Ina Balin, Lee Marvin, Nehemiah Persoff, Bruce Cabot, Jack Elam, Joan O'Brien, Patrick Wayne, and Edgar Buchanan. Also featured are Western-film veterans Bob Steele, Guinn "Big Boy" Williams, and Harry Carey, Jr. in uncredited supporting roles.

When terminal illness prevented Curtiz (director of Casablanca and The Adventures of Robin Hood) from finishing the film, Wayne took over as director, though his direction remained uncredited. Curtiz died shortly after the film was completed.

== Plot ==
In pre-Civil War New Orleans, rogue gambler Paul Regret kills Emil Bouvier, the son of a Louisiana judge, in a duel. Regret maintains that he only intended to wound Bouvier, who demanded the duel, but Bouvier sidestepped at the last moment. Aware that Bouvier's father will demand his hanging, Regret flees to the Republic of Texas, engaging in a tryst with the mysterious lady Pilar Graile during the trip.

Regret is captured by Texas Ranger Captain Jake Cutter, who refuses a bribe and thwarts Regret's escape attempt. When they witness Cutter's former homestead burned by a group of Comanche Indians, Regret knocks Cutter out and escapes. Cutter returns to his post and resumes his primary mission, pursuing a gang of outlaw "Comancheros" suspected of illegally supplying guns and whiskey to the Comanches.

The Rangers have an ex-convict named McBain in custody for possession of a wagonload of stolen guns likely destined for Comanche territory. Cutter, impersonating McBain, arrives at a planned rendezvous with Comanchero smuggler Tully Crow. The men form an uneasy partnership. That night, while playing cards, Cutter unexpectedly runs into Regret. They unsuccessfuly hide their knowledge of each other, and Cutter is forced to kill the suspicious Crow in self-defense.

With his mission against the Comancheros stalled, Cutter attempts to return Regret to Louisiana. While stopped at a friend's ranch, Cutter and Regret are caught up in a Comanche raid on the settlement. Regret flees on a horse, then returns with a company of Texas Rangers who repulse the attack. As repayment, the Rangers and a Texas judge agree to perjure themselves, issuing a statement that Regret couldn't have fought a duel in Louisiana because he was helping them spy on the Comancheros. Regret is sworn in as an official Ranger.

Cutter and Regret travel into Comanche territory posing as Comancheros with a wagonload of guns while the Rangers shadow them at a distance. Comanches intercept them and take them to a hidden community in a desert valley. The two men are released from imprisonment after the intercession of Pilar, who is the daughter of the Comancheros' paraplegic leader, Graile, who welcomes Cutter and Regret into the camp. Pilar deduces Cutter is an undercover Ranger, but conceals this from her father out of her love for Regret.

Pilar arranges an escape for Cutter and Regret, but Regret refuses, declaring his love for her and insisting they should run away together. At dinner, Pilar reveals Cutter's true identity to Graile. Cutter and Regret abduct Graile and his henchmen. During their escape a Comanchero woman, vengeful against Graile for ordering the death of her son, stabs him to death, alerting the Comanches and the Comancheros. They pursue the fleeing men but are intercepted by the remainder of the Rangers who drive the Comanche back and destroy the Comanchero camp.

Regret and Pilar leave for Mexico, where they can't be extradited, and Jake rides off into the sunset to rejoin the Rangers.

== Cast ==
- John Wayne as Capt. Jake Cutter
- Stuart Whitman as Paul Regret
- Ina Balin as Pilar Graile
- Nehemiah Persoff as Graile
- Lee Marvin as Tully Crow
- Michael Ansara as Amelung
- Bruce Cabot as Maj. Henry
- Joan O'Brien as Melinda Marshall
- Patrick Wayne as Tobe (Texas Ranger)
- Richard Devon as Estevan
- Jack Elam as Horseface
- Henry Daniell as Gireaux
- Edgar Buchanan as Judge Thaddeus Jackson Breen
- Guinn "Big Boy" Williams as Ed McBain (gunrunner)
- Bob Steele as Pa Schofield
- Leigh Snowden as Evie – Blonde in Hotel Room (uncredited)
- George J. Lewis as Chief Iron Shirt (uncredited)
- Aissa Wayne as Bessy Marshall (uncredited)

== Production ==
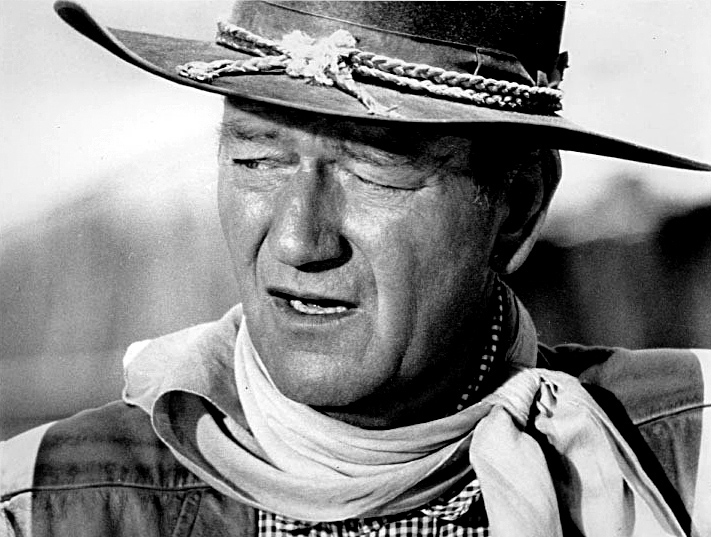
John Wayne in The Comancheros

Wellman's novel had been bought for the screen by George Stevens, who wanted to direct it after Giant (1956). He then became interested in making The Diary of Anne Frank and sold the film rights to Fox for $300,000. Clair Huffaker was signed by the studio to adapt it for producer Charles Brackett, with Gary Cooper to star. Robert Wagner was in line to play Cooper's co-star.

Cooper was dying of cancer and in early 1961 Douglas Heyes was announced as writer and director. John Wayne and Charlton Heston were announced as stars but Heston dropped out and was replaced by Tom Tryon, then Heyes dropped out and was replaced by Michael Curtiz. Fox had the script rewritten by Wayne's regular writer James Edward Grant.

Whitman, who later played a similar lead in the 1964 Rio Conchos, played the character Paul Regret, who was the lead in the novel, and Wayne's part had to be amplified for the film version. Wellman had envisioned Cary Grant as Regret as he wrote the novel. Gary Cooper and James Garner were originally set to be the leads but Cooper's ill health and Garner's blackballing over a dispute with Jack L. Warner ruled them out.

According to Tom Mankiewicz, who worked on the film as an assistant, Curtiz was often ill during production and John Wayne took over the directing. Wayne told Mankiewicz to remove his John F. Kennedy button.

Parts of the film were shot in Professor Valley, Dead Horse Point, King's Bottom, La Sal Mountains, Fisher Valley, Onion Creek, Hurrah Pass and Haver Ranch in Utah. Despite being set in Texas in 1843, all the characters use Winchester lever-action rifles and Colt Peacemaker pistols which were not in production until almost three decades later.

A tie-in with the release was a comic book adaptation from Dell which was published in Four Color #1300 (February 1962)

Claude King's version of the theme song was a top 10 country hit, and peaked at #71 on the pop charts in Billboard Magazine.

== Reception ==
Variety magazine wrote, "The Comancheros is a big, brash, uninhibited action-western of the old school about as subtle as a right to the jaw... Wayne is obviously comfortable in a role tailor-made to the specifications of his easygoing, square-shooting, tight-lipped but watch-out-when-I'm-mad screen personality. Lee Marvin makes a vivid impression in a brief, but colorful, role as a half-scalped, vile-tempered Comanchero agent."

Bosley Crowther called the film "so studiously wild and woolly it turns out to be good fun"; according to Crowther, "[t]here's not a moment of seriousness in it, not a detail that isn't performed with a surge of exaggeration, not a character that is credible."

The film earned theatrical rentals of $3.5 million in the United States and Canada.

== See also ==
- Comancheros, 18th- and 19th-century traders who were trading with the nomadic Indian tribes in northeastern New Mexico, West Texas, and other parts of the Great Plains of North America
- List of American films of 1961
- John Wayne filmography
