= The Woman Hunter =

1972 television film directed by Bernard L. Kowalski

- Genre: Mystery
- Written by: Brian Clemens; Tony Williamson
- Story by: Brian Clemens
- Directed by: Bernard L. Kowalski
- Starring: Barbara Eden; Robert Vaughn; Stuart Whitman
- Theme music composer: George Duning
- Country of origin: United States
- Original language: English

Production
- Executive producer: Andrew J. Fenady
- Producer: Jerome L. Epstein
- Cinematography: Gabriel Torres
- Editor: Melvin Shapiro
- Running time: 70 minutes
- Production companies: Bing Crosby Productions; Jerome L. Epstein Productions

Original release
- Network: CBS
- Release: September 19, 1972

The Woman Hunter is a 1972 American made-for-television mystery film that premiered as the CBS Movie of the Week on September 19, 1972. The teleplay was written by Brian Clemens and Tony Williamson (the former's first and the latter's only American TV work), from a story by Clemens about a socialite's involvement with an international thief.

The film, directed by Bernard L. Kowalski and starring Barbara Eden, Stuart Whitman and Robert Vaughn, was shot in Acapulco, Mexico and produced by Bing Crosby Productions. Larry Storch and his wife Norma appear at the beginning of the film.

== Plot ==
Dina Hunter (Barbara Eden), wealthy and unstable, takes a Mexican holiday with her husband Jerry (Robert Vaughn) in order for her to recover from a traffic accident. An artist named Paul Carter (Stuart Whitman) becomes intrigued by Dina and wants to paint her portrait. Dina's interest in him leads her to uncover clues that he is more than just an artist — she discovers that he may possibly be a jewel thief and murderer. She tries to convince her husband and the local authorities but no one will believe her story.

It has been hinted several times that Jerry's architectural projects are dependent on Dina's inherited income. When Dina sees Paul approaching the house while she is home alone, she panics, jumps in her car, and takes off at high speed down twisting mountain roads. Trying to catch her, Paul swerves his car over a cliff edge. Dina returns to the house in a panic. Jerry insists on returning to the accident scene.

While separated from Jerry, Dina finds Paul's personal tape recorder. It contains information that her husband is the jewel thief/murderer the authorities want---and that Paul is shadowing them because Jerry murdered his sister on a previous theft. She remembers that Jerry had been a beach bum whom she married against family wishes. Jerry cheerfully confesses---and that he had sabotaged her brakes to cause her previous car accident.

A battered Paul suddenly appears, and Jerry is surprised enough to back over the cliff edge to his death (helped along by an exploding gas tank).

== Cast ==
- Barbara Eden as Dina Hunter
- Robert Vaughn as Jerry Hunter
- Stuart Whitman as Paul Carter
- Sydney Chaplin as George
- Enrique Lucero as Commissioner Vardy
- Larry Storch as the Raconteur
