= Rio Conchos (film) =

1964 film

- Film poster by Frank McCarthy
- Directed by: Gordon Douglas
- Written by: Joseph Landon; Clair Huffaker (novel)
- Produced by: David Weisbart
- Starring: Richard Boone; Stuart Whitman; Tony Franciosa; Edmond O'Brien; Jim Brown
- Cinematography: Joseph MacDonald
- Edited by: Joseph Silver
- Music by: Jerry Goldsmith
- Distributed by: 20th Century Fox
- Release date: October 28, 1964
- Running time: 107 minutes
- Country: United States
- Language: English
- Box office: $2,500,000 (US/ Canada)

Rio Conchos is a 1964 American Cinemascope Western film directed by Gordon Douglas and starring Richard Boone, Stuart Whitman, Anthony Franciosa, Edmond O'Brien, and in his motion picture debut, Jim Brown, based on Clair Huffaker's novel "Guns of Rio Conchos" published in 1958.

Huffaker's novel is reminiscent of the John Wayne films The Comancheros (for which Huffaker co-wrote the screenplay) and The Searchers. The main female role, played by Wende Wagner in a black wig, has no English dialogue. Rio Conchos was filmed in Moab, Utah, though the Conchos River and most of the action of the film takes place in Mexico.

Jerry Goldsmith's complete soundtrack was given a limited release on CD in January 2000 by Film Score Monthly that featured a tie-in title song by Johnny Desmond.

On June 21, 2011, Shout! Factory released the film on DVD as part of a double feature with Take a Hard Ride (1975).

== Plot ==
An ex-Confederate States Army officer (Richard Boone) named Jim Lassiter, who has been avenging himself on Apache Indians for their massacring of his family, recovers a stolen new-type U.S. Army repeating rifle from some Apaches he has killed.

The U.S. Army arrests Lassiter for possession of the stolen gun. The army is concerned should the Apaches become equipped with the new superior firepower rifles, so offers Lassiter his freedom if he will lead a small scouting unit into Mexico to discover what became of the other stolen rifles, and if necessary destroy them. The unit consists of army captain Haven (Stuart Whitman), the Buffalo Soldier sergeant Franklyn (Jim Brown), a knife-wielding Mexican prisoner Rodriguez (Tony Franciosa) who Lassiter has befriended, and later an Apache woman warrior, Sally (Wende Wagner). They take with them 50 barrels of gunpowder, for use as required.

After battling their way through bandits and Apaches, they discover Colonel Pardee, an embittered former high-ranking Confederate army officer (Edmond O'Brien) who has set up a stronghold camp and wants to revive the war against the Union Army. Pardee's plan is to sell arms and ammunition to the Apaches and have them do the fighting. He has sold guns to those Apaches who slaughtered Lassiter's family.

The unit infiltrates Pardee's camp, claiming to be motivated by the money from the sale of the gunpowder to Pardee. The ruse is exposed when the Apache leader recognizes Lassiter as the man who kills Apaches whenever possible, and realizes Lassiter would not be doing anything that puts weapons in Apache hands. The men from the unit are assaulted and tied up, and told to expect much worse. Sally saves Lassiter's life and secretly releases him, and his hatred softens. He and Franklyn sacrifice themselves, holding off Pardee and his men long enough to enable Sally and Haven to get away, having succeeded in blowing up the gunpowder and in so doing destroying the new rifles and much of Pardee's camp.

== Cast ==
Actor	Role	Notes
Richard Boone	Major James 'Jim' Lassiter	
Stuart Whitman	Captain Haven	
Tony Franciosa	Juan Luis Rodriguez aka Juan Luis Martinez	
Edmond O'Brien	Colonel Theron 'Gray Fox' Pardee	
Jim Brown	Sergeant Franklyn	
Wende Wagner	Sally (Apache girl)	
Warner Anderson	Colonel Wagner	
Rodolfo Acosta	Bloodshirt (Apache chief)	
Barry Kelley	Croupier at Presidio	
Vito Scotti	Bandit chief	
House Peters, Jr.	Major Johnson	
Kevin Hagen	Major Johnson, aka "Blondebeard"	
Robert Adler	Pardee Soldier	Uncredited
Timothy Carey	Chico (cantina owner)	Uncredited
Abel Fernandez	Mexican Guard	Uncredited
Mickey Simpson	Bartender who refuses to serve Franklyn	Uncredited

== Production ==
Parts of the film were shot at Professor Valley, Fisher Towers, Castle Valley, Arches, and Dead Horse Point in Utah.

== Billing ==
The posters used the same approach to billing as Warner Bros. had in 1948's Key Largo, for which Humphrey Bogart had been listed first but Edward G. Robinson was placed in the middle of the three above-the-title leads with his name elevated higher than the other two (the third name being Lauren Bacall's). In the case of Rio Conchos, Whitman was billed as Bogart had been, with Boone in Robinson's middle slot and Franciosa in Bacall's spot, with his name listed third going left to right and at the same height as Whitman's. Boone, however, was billed before Whitman during the beginning onscreen credits, with each name appearing onscreen one at a time.

== Reception ==
According to Fox records, the film needed to earn $5,300,000 in film rentals to break even, but it made only $4,610,000.

== Comic book ==
Gold Key Comics published a film tie-in comic book in 1964.

== See also ==
- List of American films of 1964
