= Johnny Trouble =

1957 film

- Theatrical release poster
- Directed by: John H. Auer
- Screenplay by: Charles O'Neil; David Lord
- Story by: Ben Ames Williams
- Produced by: John H. Auer
- Starring: Ethel Barrymore; Cecil Kellaway; Stuart Whitman; Carolyn Jones; Jesse White; Rand Harper
- Cinematography: J. Peverell Marley
- Edited by: Tony Martinelli
- Music by: Frank De Vol
- Production company: Warner Bros. Pictures
- Distributed by: Warner Bros. Pictures
- Release date: September 24, 1957
- Running time: 80 minutes
- Country: United States
- Language: English

Johnny Trouble is a 1957 American drama film directed by John H. Auer and written by Charles O'Neil and David Lord. The film stars Ethel Barrymore in her final film, Cecil Kellaway, Stuart Whitman, Carolyn Jones, Jesse White and Rand Harper. The film was released by Warner Bros. Pictures on September 24, 1957.

== Plot ==
For 27 years, the wealthy invalid Katherine Chandler has been waiting for her missing son John to return to her. A nearby college buys her apartment building and intends to evict her and construct a men's dormitory, but Katherine has a lease that stipulates she cannot be moved without her consent.

Workmen begin the construction all around her unit, but rather than drive her away, Katherine charms the young men and invites them for tea. Assisted by her longtime chauffeur Tom McKay, she is carried up and down the stairs in her chair by the workers and students.

One night, a young woman named Julie Horton breaks in through the fire escape. Julie is having trouble with her boyfriend Johnny, a former Marine who is now in school. Katherine wants to meet him. She begins to wonder if this could be the son of her long-lost Johnny and quickly begins to enjoy his company and trust him.

Johnny's grades and behavior are poor, resulting in him being expelled. Katherine goes to the university's administrators to say if they will give Johnny a second chance, she will vacate her premises. They agree.

Johnny does better in school. Despite passing all of his courses, Johnny decides to drop out of school to support Julie who is now pregnant until she has the baby and places it up for adoption. After speaking to Katherine, Johnny has a change of heart and marries Julie while also deciding against dropping out. The newly married couple decide to find an off campus apartment, where they will live with Katherine.

Katherine feels as if she has a family again. That night, she dies in her sleep. All the workmen and students come to her funeral, where Tom explains that her son Johnny was actually killed in a car crash 27 years ago, but Katherine's late husband made Tom promise never to tell her, giving her hope that he might still be out there somewhere.

== Cast ==
- Ethel Barrymore as Katherine Chandler
- Cecil Kellaway as Tom McKay
- Stuart Whitman as Johnny Chandler
- Carolyn Jones as Julie Horton
- Jesse White as Parsons
- Rand Harper as Phil Wilson
- Paul Wallace as Paul Parker
- Edd Byrnes as Elliott
- Edward Castagna as Giuseppe (Tex) Costanza
- Nino Tempo as Charlie Horne
- James Bridges as Ike
- Paul Lukather as Bill
- James Bell as Reverend Harrington
- Samuel Colt as Mr. Reichow
- Kip King as Kip King
- Gavin Muir as Madden
- Jack Larson as Eddie Landis

== Production ==
It was an early lead role for Stuart Whitman.

== See also ==
- Ethel Barrymore on stage, screen and radio
