= The Fiercest Heart =

1961 film

- Directed by: George Sherman
- Written by: Edmund H. North
- Based on: novel by Stuart Cloete
- Produced by: George Sherman
- Starring: Stuart Whitman; Juliet Prowse; Raymond Massey; Geraldine Fitzgerald
- Cinematography: Ellis W. Carter
- Edited by: Richard Billings
- Music by: Irving Gertz
- Distributed by: 20th Century Fox
- Release date: March 16, 1961
- Running time: 80 minutes
- Country: United States
- Language: English
- Budget: $745,000

The Fiercest Heart is a 1961 American adventure film in CinemaScope and Color by De Luxe starring Stuart Whitman and Juliet Prowse, also featuring 1960 Summer Olympics decathlon champion Rafer Johnson. It is set in 1830s South Africa and based on the 1955 novel of the same name by Stuart Cloete.

== Plot ==
Three men escape from a prison garrison in South Africa, 1837. As they encounter a tribe of Boers led by Willem Prinsloo who are trekking into the country's interior, one of the fugitives, Steve Bates, a British soldier, immediately develops a romantic interest in Prinsloo's beautiful granddaughter, Francina.

Bates and his fellow escapees, his African friend Nzobo and a brutal criminal, Harry Carter, help hold off a raid by Zulu warriors, but Prinsloo is badly wounded. To the fury of Barent Beyer, a man who loves Francina, her grandfather's last wish before he dies is that Bates now become the group's leader.

The jealous Barent sets an ambush to kill Bates, but before he can, he is felled by a Zulu spear. Carter, too, ends up dead, Bates avenging an assault on Francina. What remains of the group is able to go back to Francina's farm in peace after the Zulu chief is killed in battle by Nzobo.

== Cast ==
- Stuart Whitman as Bates
- Juliet Prowse as Francina
- Raymond Massey as Willem Prinsloo
- Geraldine Fitzgerald as Tante
- Rafer Johnson as Nzobo
- Ken Scott as Carter
- Michael David as Barent

== Production ==
The film was greenlit by Robert Goldstein, who was head of 20th Century Fox after the death of Buddy Adler. The original stars were Stuart Whitman and Joan Collins but Collins dropped out. THe original title was Journey into Danger.

Filmimg started 26 September 1960.

== Reception ==
Variety called it "tame, rather antiquated-in-style."

Variety later called the film "throwaway fare" and an example of "the kind of indiscriminate production" that Fox put out in 1960-61.
