= Condominium (film) =

1980 American film

- Genre: Action; Drama; Disaster
- Based on: Condominium by John D. MacDonald
- Written by: Steve Hayes
- Directed by: Sidney Hayers
- Starring: Barbara Eden; Dan Haggerty; Steve Forrest; Ana Alicia; Richard Anderson; Ralph Bellamy; Larry Bishop; Macdonald Carey; Dane Clark; Linda Cristal; Elinor Donahue; Don Galloway; Pamela Hensley; Arte Johnson; Jack Jones; Dorothy Malone; Mimi Maynard; Nehemiah Persoff; Nedra Volz; Carlene Watkins; Stuart Whitman
- Music by: Gerald Fried
- Country of origin: United States
- Original language: English

Production
- Executive producer: Robert A. Cinader
- Producers: Gian R. Grimaldi; Hannah L. Shearer
- Production locations: Panama City, Florida; Playa del Rey, Los Angeles
- Cinematography: Frank Thackery
- Editor: John Kaufman Jr.
- Running time: 240 minutes (including commercials)
- Production company: Universal Television

Original release
- Network: HBO
- Release: April 6 – April 7, 1980

Condominium is a 1980 American two-part, four-hour made-for-television disaster film starring Barbara Eden, Dan Haggerty and Steve Forrest and featuring an ensemble cast of well-known television actors, including Ana Alicia, Richard Anderson, Ralph Bellamy, Larry Bishop, Macdonald Carey, Dane Clark, Linda Cristal, Elinor Donahue, Don Galloway, Pamela Hensley, Arte Johnson, Jack Jones, Dorothy Malone, Mimi Maynard, Lee Paul, Nehemiah Persoff, Nedra Volz, Carlene Watkins and Stuart Whitman.

Directed by Sidney Hayers and adapted from a novel of the same name by John D. MacDonald, the film depicts events in the lives of the residents at Silver Sands Condominium – a Florida complex built by a greedy and irresponsible corporation – and the problems that occur when an impending hurricane threatens to destroy Silver Sands. Condominium was originally broadcast on HBO on April 6 and 7, 1980 and then broadcast commercially in syndication seven months later on November 20 and 21, 1980 as part of Operation Prime Time syndicated programming.

== Plot ==
=== Part 1 ===
The residents of Silver Sands Condominium in Fiddler Key, Florida are dealing with rising condominium association fees, as well as interpersonal relationships and conflicts taking place within their building. Barbara Messenger (Barbara Eden) is the younger wife of wealthy retired industrialist Lee Messenger (Ralph Bellamy) who is dying of cancer. She develops an attraction to hydraulics engineer Sam Harrison (Dan Haggerty), who is visiting his friend Gus Garver (Steve Forrest), a retired engineer acting as chairman of the condominium homeowners association whose wife Carolyn (Virginia Leith) is recovering from a stroke in the hospital. Sam is the one who first discovers the cracks in the building's foundation and notices the poor materials and workmanship characterizing the construction of the building.

Meanwhile, Jack Messenkott (Don Galloway), a middle-aged man and his emotionally fragile younger wife Thelma (Ana Alicia) are an unhappily married couple: Jack is frustrated with Thelma and does not share her love of the natural environment surrounding the condominium while he prefers spending time playing tennis. Julian Higbee (Larry Bishop), a playboy and the sleazy manager of Silver Sands, is married to the beautiful Lorrie (Mimi Maynard) but is having an affair with nurse Bobbie Fish (Carlene Watkins).

Sam begins working closely with Gus, the Messengers, former CIA agent Henry Churchbridge (Richard Anderson) and his wealthy aristocratic Italian wife Carlotta (Linda Cristal) to try to make unscrupulous construction magnate Marty Liss (Stuart Whitman) pay for a seawall and other repairs that might help provide reinforcement for the building. The residents of Silver Sands do not realize that Liss and his construction operation are a front to launder syndicate money and that construction of the condominium was the result of these endeavors. Liss cut corners on the building's construction in order to pocket some of the budget for the construction costs for himself.

=== Part 2 ===
As Sam and Gus try to raise the consciousness of the other Silver Sands residents regarding the potential safety issues concerning the building, they must eventually deal with the impending arrival of the deadly Hurricane Ella. Conlaw (Nehemiah Persoff), a ruthless Miami mobster that Marty Liss works for who financed the construction of Silver Sands, is outraged when he learns Liss embezzled money from the construction budget for his own personal gain, especially since his elderly mother (Nedra Volz) is living in the building. Meanwhile, Lorrie and Bobbie are both fed up with Julian and turn to each other for emotional support; when Lorrie mentions to Bobbie that she is leaving Julian once and for all, Julian walks in on them and Lorrie stands up to him and both women walk out on Julian for good.

As the storm approaches with winds of 130 miles an hour, most of the residents vacate to the mainland for safety, while other residents who refuse to vacate decide to stay behind and throw a "Hurricane Party". Hurricane Ella powerfully generates a storm surge that strikes Fiddler Key and crashes into the condominium, causing the building to crumble into the ocean. A guilt-stricken Marty Liss commits suicide as he overhears the horrible events of the storm being reported on the radio. One month later, Gus's wife is still recovering at the hospital; Henry and Carlotta Churchbridge have relocated to Switzerland to begin a new life; Barbara and Sam are reunited in Fiddler Key and, still shocked by the destruction of Silver Sands Condominium, they realize they must continue to live their lives with the after-effects of Hurricane Ella.

== Cast ==
Barbara Eden as Barbara Messenger
Barbara is a beautiful young woman; she is married to wealthy older husband Lee Messenger but is also attracted to Sam Harrison

Dan Haggerty as Sam Harrison
Sam is a hydraulics engineer visiting Silver Sands; he is a friend of Gus Garver and attracted to Barbara Messenger

Steve Forrest as Gus Garver
Gus is a retired engineer acting as Chairman of the condominium homeowners association; his wife Carolyn is recovering from a stroke in the hospital

Ana Alicia as Thelma Messenkott
Thelma is an emotionally fragile young woman who loves to explore the nature surrounding Silver Sands; Jack Messenkott's younger wife

Richard Anderson as Henry Churchbridge
Henry is a retired government intelligence officer; Carlotta's husband

Ralph Bellamy as Lee Messenger
Lee is a wealthy retired industrialist dying of cancer; Barbara's older husband

Larry Bishop as Julian Higbee
Julian is a sleazy playboy and building manager of Silver Sands; he is married to Lorrie but is having an affair with Bobbie Fish

Macdonald Carey as Dr. Arthur Castor
Dr. Castor is administrator of the local hospital where Gus's wife is recovering from a stroke

Dane Clark as Pete McGinnity
Pete is president of the board of directors of Silver Sands Condominium Association

Linda Cristal as Carlotta Churchbridge
Carlotta is a wealthy aristocratic Italian woman; Henry Churchbridge's wife

Elinor Donahue as Audrey Ames
Audrey is a resident of Silver Sands; Brooke Ames's wife

Don Galloway as Jack Messenkott
Jack is a middle-aged man and tennis player; unhappily married to younger wife Thelma

Pamela Hensley as Drusilla Byrne
Drusilla is an attractive associate of Marty Liss spying on Silver Sands residents; she is attracted to Gus Garver

Arte Johnson as Brooke Ames
Brooke is a resident of Silver Sands; Audrey's husband

Jack Jones as Cole Kimber
Cole is a building contractor working for Marty Liss; attracted to Drusilla Byrne

Dorothy Malone as Molly Denniver
Molly is a friend and lover of Marty Liss; married to County Commissioner Justin Denniver

Mimi Maynard as Lorrie Higbee
Lorrie is a resident of Silver Sands; Julian Higbee's wife

Nehemiah Persoff as Conlaw
Conlaw is a ruthless Miami mobster who financed the construction of Silver Sands for Marty Liss; Mrs. Conlaw's son

Nedra Volz as Mrs. Conlaw
Mrs. Conlaw is an elderly resident of Silver Sands; Conlaw's mother

Carlene Watkins as Bobbie Fish
Bobbie is a nurse and resident of Silver Sands; she is the mistress of sleazy playboy and building manager Julian Higbee

Stuart Whitman as Marty Liss
Marty is an unscrupulous construction magnate of a greedy and irresponsible corporation

== Production notes ==
Condominium was filmed from August to November 1979 on location at Pinnacle Port Condominiums in Panama City, Florida and Playa del Rey in Los Angeles, California; interior scenes were shot at Universal Studios in Universal City, California.

According to production notes, in the scene where Barbara Eden, Dan Haggerty and Ralph Bellamy are struggling to reach the mainland during the hurricane which was filmed at Falls Lake on the backlot of Universal Studios, executive producer Robert A. Cinader had a real challenge to create hurricane-like forces on a beautiful sunny California day. Combining the forces of the Los Angeles County Fire Department in the use of three fire engines, a deluge truck, a portable deluge gun and eight firemen, Cinader was able to pump 9,500 gallons of water per minute into the lake toward the boat housing the cast; with the aid of special effects coordinator Dave Lopez and his crew, water cannons, large wind machines, wave and rain-making machines were all put into action. Although the skies were blue and cloudless, and the sunshine was enough to burn the skin, the result was a stormy, dark effect with crashing, water-swollen waves which ultimately capsized the boat. Much of this equipment was driven to the Florida location also to be used in creating dramatic hurricane scenes at the actual condominium site.

The interiors and the exterior of the condominium were duplicated in miniature size for the hurricane scenes. To get the realistic effect of a hurricane tidal wave crashing into the condominium, a sixty-man crew at Universal Studios on Soundstage 27 created an 8-foot high replica of the actual Florida condominium, complete with swimming pool. The tidal wave effect called for 10 wind machines, six wave-makers and four dump tanks that unleashed 80 tons of water down three chutes.

Taglines:

- "A playground for the rich, poised on the brink of destruction!"
- "They thought they were buying Paradise. What they got was a killer hurricane!"
- "Mammoth tidal wave puts Condominium residents on a collision course with disaster!"

Condominium was one of the many TV movies, miniseries and other shows syndicated to local independent television stations in the USA in the late 1970s-early 1980s as part of a project known as Operation Prime Time, in an effort to compete with the three major broadcast networks.
