= The Man from the Alamo =

1953 film by Budd Boetticher

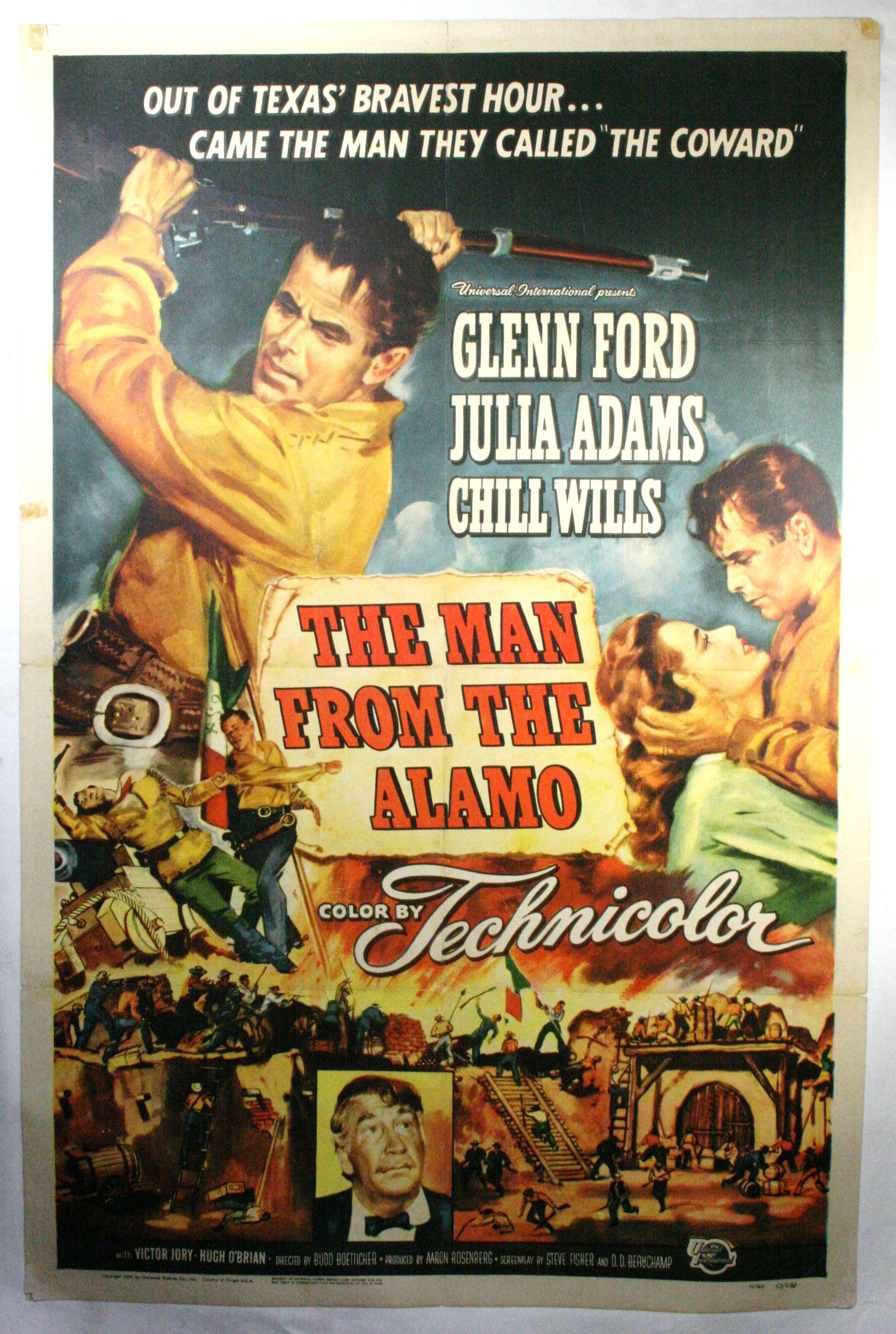
- Theatrical release poster by Reynold Brown
- Directed by: Budd Boetticher
- Screenplay by: Steve Fisher; D.D. Beauchamp
- Story by: Niven Busch; Oliver Crawford
- Produced by: Aaron Rosenberg
- Starring: Glenn Ford; Julia Adams; Chill Wills
- Cinematography: Russell Metty
- Edited by: Virgil W. Vogel
- Music by: Frank Skinner
- Color process: Technicolor
- Production company: Universal International Pictures
- Distributed by: Universal Pictures
- Release date: August 21, 1953
- Running time: 79 minutes
- Country: United States
- Language: English
- Box office: $1.15 million (US)

The Man from the Alamo is a 1953 American Western film directed by Budd Boetticher and starring Glenn Ford, Julia Adams and Chill Wills.

== Plot ==
During the siege at the Alamo, John Stroud (Glenn Ford) is chosen by lot to leave the fort and check on his family and warn other families of the mission's defenders of the impending arrival of General Santa Anna. But when everyone who stayed at the Alamo is wiped out by the Mexicans, Stroud is branded a coward. When Stroud returns to his family, he finds that they have all been killed. Stroud takes the initiative to help other families move to safety from the pursuit of Wade, a Santa Anna sympathizer.

== Cast ==
- Glenn Ford as John Stroud
- Julia Adams as Beth Anders
- Chill Wills as John Gage
- Hugh O'Brian as Lieutenant Lamar
- Victor Jory as Jess Wade
- Neville Brand as Dawes
- John Daheim as Cavish
- Myra Marsh as Ma Anders
- Jeanne Cooper as Kate Lamar
- Marc Cavell as Carlos
- Edward Norris as Mapes
- Guy Williams as Sergeant
- Arthur Space as Lieutenant Colonel William Barrett Travis
- Stuart Randall as Jim Bowie
- Trevor Bardette as Davy Crockett
- Dennis Weaver as Reb
- Ethan Laidlaw as Citizen (uncredited)
- Jack Mower as Patriot (uncredited)
- Stuart Whitman as orderly (uncredited)
