= Barbed Wire (1952 film) =

1952 film

- Theatrical release poster
- Directed by: George Archainbaud
- Written by: Gerald Geraghty
- Produced by: Armand Schaefer
- Starring: Gene Autry; Anne James; William Fawcett
- Cinematography: William Bradford
- Edited by: James Sweeney
- Production company: Columbia Pictures
- Distributed by: Columbia Pictures
- Release date: July 25, 1952
- Running time: 61 minutes
- Country: United States
- Language: English
- Budget: $58,874.36

Barbed Wire is a 1952 American Western film directed by George Archainbaud, written by Gerald Geraghty and starring Gene Autry, Anne James and William Fawcett. The plot concerns a cattle buyer who goes to Texas to investigate why the cattle trails to Kansas are blocked.

== Cast ==
- Gene Autry as Gene Autry
- Anne James as Gay Kendall
- Pat Buttram as "Buckeye" Buttram
- Leonard Penn as Steve Ruttledge
- William Fawcett as John S. 'Uncle John' Copeland
- Michael Vallon as Homesteader August Gormley

== Production ==
Barbed Wire was filmed from December 10 to 20, 1951. The film had an operating budget of $58,874.36 (equal to $730,264 today).

== Bibliography ==
- George-Warren, Holly (2007). Public Cowboy no. 1: The Life and Times of Gene Autry. New York: Oxford University Press. ISBN 978-0195177466.
- Green, Douglas B. (2002). Singing in the Saddle: The History of the Singing Cowboy. Nashville: Vanderbilt University Press. ISBN 978-0826514127.
