= War Drums =

1957 film by Reginald LeBorg

- Theatrical release poster
- Directed by: Reginald LeBorg
- Screenplay by: Gerald Drayson Adams
- Produced by: Howard W. Koch
- Starring: Lex Barker; Joan Taylor; Ben Johnson; Larry Chance; Richard H. Cutting; John Pickard
- Cinematography: William Margulies
- Edited by: John A. Bushelman
- Music by: Les Baxter
- Production companies: Schenck-Koch Productions; Bel-Air Productions
- Distributed by: United Artists
- Release date: March 21, 1957
- Running time: 75 minutes
- Country: United States
- Language: English

War Drums is a 1957 American Western film directed by Reginald LeBorg, written by Gerald Drayson Adams, and starring Lex Barker, Joan Taylor, Ben Johnson, Larry Chance, Richard H. Cutting and John Pickard. The film was produced by Aubrey Schenck and Howard W. Koch for United Artists and it was released on March 21, 1957.

== Plot ==
Prior to the American Civil War, a group of Apache led by their chief Mangas Coloradas track some of their stolen horses to a group of Mexicans. The Apaches kill the lot of them and take their communal woman Riva. The Apaches' initial intention was to sell Riva north of the border to the Americans. On two occasions, Mangas refuses to sell Riva to his good friend Luke Fargo, despite being offered excellent deals for her.

Fargo brings a government representative to meet with Mangas, trying to come to terms with the Apaches. The most Mangas will promise is the Apache will not break the peace with the whites first.

Mangas desires Riva for his wife, an honor never before extended to a Mexican woman (although later in the movie, Riva says her father was Mexican and her mother Comanche). He has to fight three braves who disagree with him, killing all three. He then tells the band that Riva will not be a squaw, but will be trained as a warrior, again breaking with custom. Following Mangas's second refusal to sell him Riva, whom Luke also wants for a wife, Luke reluctantly attends their wedding.

Meanwhile, a group of American gold seekers enter the Apache lands. After making a gold strike in a stream, they attack the Indians camped on the bank. When Mangas comes to bring the offending miners to the law, they pinion and whip him. This sets off an Apache war, with Mangas Coloradas becoming known as "Red Sleeves."

Fargo attempts to put a stop to the war by bringing a representative from Washington to meet with Mangas. The attempt fails when the Apaches, thinking they are about to be ambushed by the white men, fire on them. In the ensuing firefight, Luke is shot by an arrow. Taken to Mangas's camp, Riva removes the arrow and nurses Luke back to health. He is sent back with a message from Mangas to the government.

When the Civil War breaks out, Luke volunteers for the Union and is commissioned a major in the cavalry. He is assigned to the frontier, to deal with the Apache problem. Meanwhile, Mangas is wounded on a raid, taking a bullet that shatters his breastbone. Riva takes him to a town with a doctor. Mangas promises the doctor that if he can patch him up and he lives, the town will be safe from the Apaches. But if he dies, the tribe will kill everyone in the town and burn it to the ground.

While he is being worked on by the doctor, Fargo and a troop of cavalry arrive. He goes forward to the defenses set up by the Apache under a flag of truce, and recognized by braves who know him and his friendship with Mangas, is passed inside. The friends meet and talk, and Fargo leads Mangas, Riva, and their warriors out of the town. Luke advises Mangas to take his people deep into the mountains where it will be a long time (if ever) before the cavalry can come after them. Wishing each other well, Mangas and Riva take their leave of Luke and lead their people away from the town.

== Cast ==
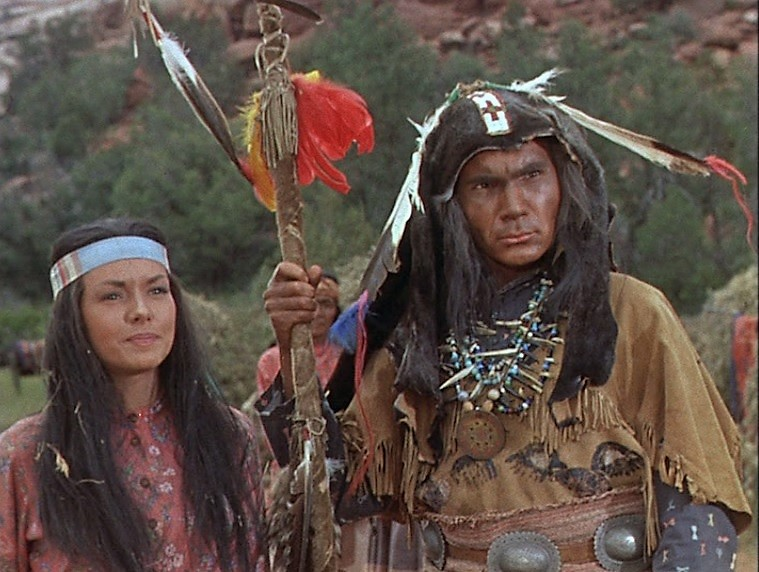
Jil Jarmyn and John Colicos in War Drums (1957)

- Lex Barker as Mangas Coloradas
- Joan Taylor as Riva
- Ben Johnson as Luke Fargo
- Larry Chance as Ponce
- Richard H. Cutting as Judge Benton
- John Pickard as Sheriff Bullard
- James Parnell as Arizona
- John Colicos as Chino
- Tom Monroe as Dutch Herman
- Jil Jarmyn as Nona
- Jeanne Carmen as Yellow Moon
- Mauritz Hugo as Clay Staub
- Ward Ellis as Delgadito
- Jack Hupp as Lt. Roberts

== Production ==
Parts of the film were shot in Kanab Canyon (on Kanab Creek), and Johnson Canyon (Juab County, Utah), in Utah.

According to the July 1956 Hollywood Reporter, there were accidents on the set of War Drums. A lightning strike destroyed a generator, delaying production a few days, and a fire burned up one of the wardrobe trailers.

== Retrospective appraisal ==
Film historian Wheeler W. Dixon dismisses the War Drums, one of two Westerns Reginald LeBorg directed for United Artists' Comet Productions, its "B movie" unit (the other is The Dalton Girls (1957). Dixon reports that Lex Barker's portrayal of Mangus Coloradas is "extremely unconvincing," adding that "the film is patronizing and mechanical, redeemed only by the work of the always dependable Ben Johnson."
