= Michael Ansara filmography =

Michael Ansara (Arabic: مايكل جورج عنصرة, romanized: Māykil Jōrj ʾAnṣara; April 15, 1922 – July 31, 2013) was a Syrian‐American actor. He was often cast in Arab and Native American roles. His work in both film and television spanned several genres, including historical epics, Westerns, and science fiction.

He portrayed Cochise in the television series Broken Arrow 1956-1958, Deputy U.S. Marshal Sam Buckhart in the NBC series Law of the Plainsman, Commander Kang in Star Trek: The Original Series, Star Trek: Deep Space Nine, and Star Trek: Voyager, Kane in the 1979–1981 series Buck Rogers in the 25th Century, and provided the voice for Mr. Freeze in the DC Animated Universe.

Ansara received a star on the Hollywood Walk of Fame for his work in the television industry, located at 6666 Hollywood Boulevard.

== Feature films ==
Year	Title	Role	Notes	Ref(s)
1944	Action in Arabia	Hamid	Uncredited	
1944	Can't Help Singing	California Caballero	Uncredited	
1947	Intrigue	Ramon's Radio Man		
1947	Queen Esther: A Story from the Bible	Zabad		
1949	Outpost in Morocco	Rifle Dispenser	Uncredited	
1950	South Sea Sinner	Native Policeman	Uncredited	
1950	The Desert Hawk	Guard	Uncredited	
1950	Kim	Harem Guard	Uncredited	
1951	Soldiers Three	Manik Rao		
1951	Only the Valiant	Tucsos		
1951	Smuggler's Island	Sikh Policeman	Uncredited	
1951	Bannerline	Floyd		
1951	My Favorite Spy	House Servant	Uncredited	
1952	Brave Warrior	The Prophet		
1952	Diplomatic Courier	Ivan	Uncredited	
1952	Yankee Buccaneer	Lieutenant Romero		
1952	The Golden Hawk	Bernardo Díaz		
1952	Road to Bali	Guard	Uncredited	
1953	The Lawless Breed	Gus Hanley	Uncredited	
1953	The Bandits of Corsica	Blacksmith		
1953	Serpent of the Nile	Captain Florus		
1953	Julius Caesar	Pindarus		
1953	White Witch Doctor	De Gama	Uncredited	
1953	The Robe	Judas	Uncredited	
1953	Slaves of Babylon	Prince Belshazzar		
1953	The Diamond Queen	Mir Jumla, the Mogul's general		
1954	Three Young Texans	Apache Joe		
1954	Drums of Tahiti	Opening Narrator	Uncredited	
1954	The Saracen Blade	Count Alesandro Siniscola		
1954	Princess of the Nile	Captain Kral		
1954	The Egyptian	Hittite Commander	Uncredited	
1954	Bengal Brigade	Sergeant Major Puran Singh		
1954	Sign of the Pagan	Edecon		
1955	Jupiter's Darling	Maharbal		
1955	Abbott and Costello Meet the Mummy	Charlie		
1955	New Orleans Uncensored	Floyd 'Zero' Saxon		
1956	Diane	Count Ridolfi		
1956	The Lone Ranger	Angry Horse		
1956	Gun Brothers	Shawnee Jack		
1956	Pillars of the Sky	Kamiakin		
1956	The Ten Commandments	Taskmaster	Uncredited	
1957	Last of the Badmen	Kramer		
1957	Quantez	Delgadito		
1957	The Tall Stranger	Zarata		
1957	The Sad Sack	Moki	Uncredited	
1961	Voyage to the Bottom of the Sea	Miguel Alvarez		
1961	The Comancheros	Amelung		
1964	Quick, Let's Get Married	Mayor Pablo		
1965	The Greatest Story Ever Told	Herod's Commander		
1965	Harum Scarum	Prince Dragna		
1966	...And Now Miguel	Blas Chavez		
1966	Texas Across the River	Iron Jacket		
1968	The Destructors	Count Mario Romano		
1968	Sol Madrid	Captain Ortega		
1968	Daring Game	President Eduardo Delgado		
1968	The Pink Jungle	Raul Ortega		
1969	Target: Harry	Major Milos Segora		
1969	Guns of the Magnificent Seven	Colonel Diego		
1970	The Phynx	Colonel Rostinov		
1972	Dear Dead Delilah	Morgan Charles		
1972	Stand Up and Be Counted	Playboy Speaker		
1973	The Doll Squad	Eamon O'Reilly		
1974	It's Alive	The Captain		
1974	The Bears and I	Oliver Red Fern		
1976	The Message	Abu Sufyan		
1977	The Manitou	John Singing Rock		
1977	Day of the Animals	Daniel Santee		
1977	Mission to Glory: A True Story	Chief Coxi		
1980	Beyond Evil	Troido		
1981	The Guns and the Fury	Prince Sohrab		
1984	Access Code	Senator Dales		
1985	KGB: The Secret War	Lyman Taylor		
1986	Knights of the City	Mr. Delamo		
1987	Assassination	Senator Bunsen		
1990	Border Shootout	Chuluha		
1998	Batman & Mr. Freeze: SubZero	Dr. Victor Fries / Mr. Freeze	Voice, direct-to-video	
1999	The Long Road Home	Murdock Haynes	Final film role	

== Television films ==
Television films of Michael Ansara
Date	Title	Role	Notes	Ref.
March 27, 1962	Adam MacKenzie, Frontier Doctor	Adam MacKenzie	Proposed Wagon Train spin off	
1964	The Long Rifle and the Tomahawk	Ogana		
January 7, 1967	How I Spent My Summer Vacation	Pucci		
1969	Target: Harry	Major Milos Segora		
April 16, 1971	Powderkeg	Paco Morales	Pilot movie for Bearcats!	
February 16, 1973	Call to Danger	Frank Mulvey		
October 30, 1973	Ordeal	Sheriff Peter Geeson	ABC Movie of the Week	
January 9, 1974	Shootout in a One-Dog Town	Reynolds	ABC Movie of the Week	
May 4, 1975	The Barbary Coast	Diamond Jack Bassiter	Pilot movie for Barbary Coast	
September 6, 1978	Dr. Strange	Voice of Yao/Ancient One		
1979	The Story of Esther	Haman		
1982	Bayou Romance	Zanko		
1984	The Fantastic World of D.C. Collins	Turk		

== Recurring television roles ==
Recurring series roles of Michael Ansara
Year(s)	Series	Role	Episodes	Ref.
1956–1958	Broken Arrow	Cochise	72 episodes	
1959–1960	Law of the Plainsman	Deputy Marshal Sam Buckhart	30 episodes	
1979–1980	Buck Rogers in the 25th Century	Kane	3 episodes	
1986	Rambo: The Force of Freedom	Voice of General Warhawk	63 episodes	

== Television guest appearances ==
Television guest appearances of Michael Ansara
Date	Series	Episode	Role	Ref.
February 8, 1951	The Lone Ranger	"Trouble at Black Rock"	Walker	
March 25, 1951	Family Theater	"Hill Number One: A Story of Faith and Inspiration"	Decius	
November 21, 1951	Family Theater	"That I May See"		
March 10, 1952	Dangerous Assignment	"The Bodyguard Story"	Hugo	
April 14, 1952	Dangerous Assignment	"The One Blue Chip Story"	Chin	
May 1, 1952	Dangerous Assignment	"The Mine Story"	Bulga	
June 16, 1952	Dangerous Assignment	"The Decoy Story"	Kursta	
December 31, 1954	Dragnet	"The Big Rod"	Carl Chapman	
January 29, 1956	Alfred Hitchcock Presents	"Shopping For Death"	Butcher	
April 15, 1956	Alfred Hitchcock Presents	"The Orderly World of Mr. Appelby"	Desar	
May 6, 1956	Alfred Hitchcock Presents	"The Baby Sitter"	Mr. DeMario	
April 3, 1957	Hawkeye and the Last of the Mohicans	"Hawkeye's Homecoming"	Ogana	
February 17, 1959	The Rifleman	"The Indian"	Deputy Marshal Sam Buckhart	
June 9, 1959	The Rifleman	"The Raid"	Deputy Marshal Sam Buckhart	
October 2, 1960	The Rebel	"The Champ"	Docker Mason	
November 3, 1960	The Untouchables	"Nicky"	Charlie Steuben	
February 2, 1961	The Untouchables	"The Jamaica Ginger Story"	Rafael Torrez	
January 11, 1961	Wagon Train	"The Patience Miller Story"	Northstar	
October 3, 1963	Rawhide	"Incident of Iron Bull"	Joseph	
November 9, 1964	Voyage to the Bottom of the Sea	"Hot Line"	Malinoff	
April 16, 1964	Perry Mason	"The Case of the Antic Angel"	Vince Kabat	
September 19, 1964	The Outer Limits	"Soldier"	Quarlo Clobregnny	
April 14, 1965	The Virginian	"Showdown"	Marshall Merle Frome	
February 21, 1965	Branded	"The Bounty"	Thomas Frye	
October 29, 1965	The Man from U.N.C.L.E.	"The Arabian Affair"	Sulador	
January 2, 1966	Voyage to the Bottom of the Sea	"The Killers of the Deep"	Capt. Tomas Ruiz	
March 2, 1966	Lost in Space	"The Challenge"	The Ruler	
March 3, 1966	Daniel Boone	"The Search"	Sebastian Drake	
March 5, 1966	Gunsmoke	"Honor Before Justice"	Grey Horse	
September 12, 1966	I Dream of Jeannie	"Happy Anniversary"	Blue Djinn	
September 20, 1966	The Girl from U.N.C.L.E.	"The Prisoner of the Zalamar Affair"	Vizier	
October 13, 1966	Bewitched	"A Most Unusual Wood Nymph"	Rufus the Red	
November 16, 1966	The Virginian	"High Stakes"	Paul Dallman	
November 17, 1966	Daniel Boone	"The Enchanted Gun"	Sebastian Drake	
November 25, 1966	The Time Tunnel	"Secret Weapon"	Curator	
February 18, 1967	Gunsmoke	"The Returning"	Luke Todd	
March 14, 1967	The Fugitive	"The Savage Street"	Officer Miguel 'Mike' Anza	
March 24, 1967	The Time Tunnel	"The Kidnappers"	Curator	
January 2, 1968	I Dream of Jeannie	"The Battle of Waikiki"	King Kamehameha	
February 9, 1968	Tarzan	"Trek to Terror"	Regis	
November 1, 1968	Star Trek	"Day of the Dove"	Commander Kang	
January 26, 1969	Land of the Giants	"On a Clear Night You Can See Earth"	Murtrah	
December 9, 1969	I Dream of Jeannie	"My Sister, the Home Wrecker"	Major Biff Jellico	
January 23, 1970	The Name of the Game	"The Takeover"	Ben Kaliman	
May 19, 1970	I Dream of Jeannie	"One Jeannie Beats Four of a Kind"	Director	
February 23, 1971	The Mod Squad	"A Double for Danger"	Ray Abruzzi	
September 12, 1972	Hawaii Five-O	"Death is a Company Policy"	Piro Manoa	
December 9, 1972	The Streets of San Francisco	"The Year of the Locusts"	Albert 'Al' Ferguson	
February 23, 1973	Mission: Impossible	"The Western"	Ed Stoner	
January 31, 1974	Chopper One	"The Bust-Out"	Vic Altmann	
November 23, 1974	Nakia	"The Dream"	Howard Gray Hawk	
January 30, 1976	The Rockford Files	"Joey Blue Eyes"	Joseph DiMinna	
February 22, 1976	Kojak	"Justice Deferred"	Keith McCallum	
October 1, 1978	Centennial	Only the Rocks Live Forever"	Lame Beaver	
May 10, 1980	Fantasy Island	"My Fair Pharoh/The Power"	Ptolemy	
October 19, 1980	CHiPs	"The Poachers"	Nathan McCallister	
October 31, 1981	Thundarr the Barbarian	"Prophecy of Peril"	Vashtar, voice	
December 5, 1981	Spider-Man and His Amazing Friends	"Quest of the Red Skull"	Hiawatha Smith, voice	
November 2, 1985	Hunter	"Rape and Revenge, Part 1 & 2"	General Mariano	
December 2, 1985	Hardcastle and McCormick	"Mirage a Trois"	Sheik Abdullah Casir	
January 10, 1986	The Fall Guy	"Miami's Nice"	Cyril Duncan	
April 29, 1987	The New Mike Hammer	"A Blinding Fear"	Sandor Kraken	
December 18, 1988	Murder, She Wrote	"The Last Flight of the Dixie Damsel"	Nicholas Rossi	
September 7, 1992	Batman: The Animated Series	"Heart of Ice"	Voice of Mr. Freeze / Dr. Victor Fries	
March 27, 1994	Star Trek: Deep Space Nine	"Blood Oath	Kang	
November 16, 1994	Babylon 5	"The Geometry of Shadows"	Elric	
November 26, 1994	Batman: The Animated Series	"Deep Freeze"	Voice of Mr. Freeze / Dr. Victor Fries	
April 29, 1996	Star Trek: Deep Space Nine	"The Muse"	Jeyal	
September 11, 1996	Star Trek: Voyager	"Flashback"	Kang	
October 11, 1997	The New Batman Adventures	"Cold Comfort"	Voice of Mr. Freeze / Dr. Victor Fries	
February 13, 1999	Batman Beyond	"Meltdown"	Voice of Mr. Freeze / Dr. Victor Fries	

== Video games ==
Year	Title	Role	Notes	Ref.
2001	Batman: Vengeance	Mr. Freeze / Dr. Victor Fries	Final acting role	

== Videos ==
Year	Title	Role	Notes	Ref.
1997	Johnny Mysto: Boy Wizard	Malfeasor		
