= Helen Boyce =

American actress (1918–1997)

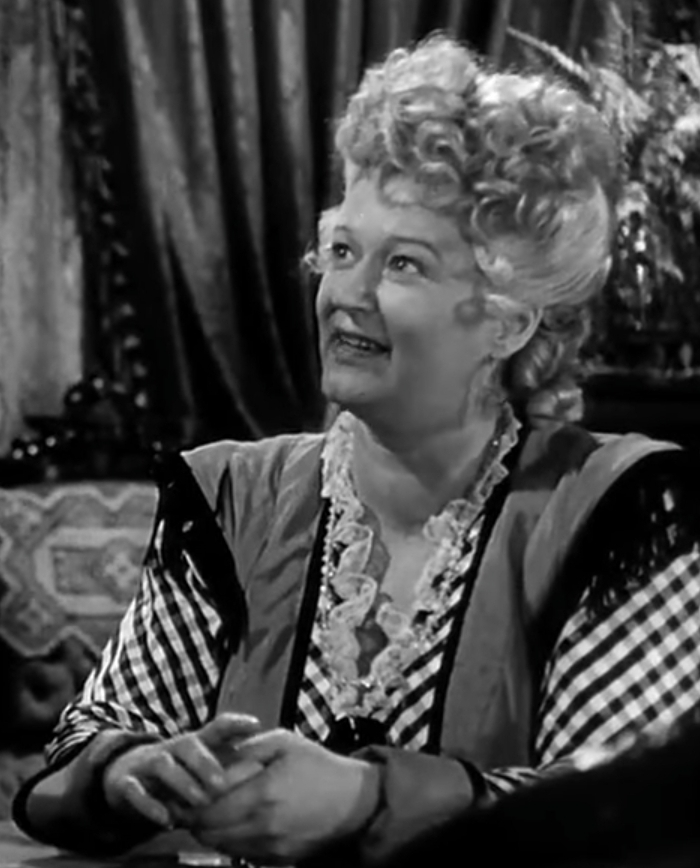
- Boyce in Abilene Town (1946)
- Born: Helen Boise; September 24, 1918; North Campbell, Missouri, U.S.
- Died: February 27, 1997 (aged 78); Burbank, California, U.S.
- Occupation: Actress
- Years active: 1943–1948

Helen Boyce (born Helen Boise; September 24, 1918 – February 27, 1997) was an American film actress of the 1940s.

== Biography ==
Born in Missouri, Boyce moved to Hollywood in the early 1940s to pursue a career in acting. Her first film role was uncredited, in the 1943 film Above Suspicion, starring Joan Crawford and Basil Rathbone. 1945 and 1946 were her biggest years, with her appearing in five films over the two-year period. Her biggest role during her short-lived career was the 1946 film Abilene Town, starring Randolph Scott and Lloyd Bridges. In 1947 and 1948 she had only three film appearances, only one of which was credited, that one being the 1947 film Hollywood Barn Dance. Her last appearance was uncredited, in the 1948 film Arch of Triumph. She retired afterwards, and settled in Burbank, California, where she was living at the time of her death on February 27, 1997.

== Filmography ==
Year	Title	Role	Notes
1943	Above Suspicion	Fat Dowager Dancing with Hassert	(uncredited)
1945	Abbott and Costello in Hollywood	Richly Dressed Woman	(uncredited)
1945	Spreadin' the Jam	Landlady	(short, as Helen Boise)
1945	Ziegfeld Follies	Countness ("This Heart of Mine")	(uncredited)
1946	Abilene Town	Big Anne	
1946	Inside Job	Overweight Woman	(uncredited)
1946	Double Rhythm (a.k.a. Musical Parade: Double Rhythm)	Kate	short
1947	Hollywood Barn Dance	Esmeralda 'Ezzy' Perkins	
1947	Merton of the Movies	Minor Role	(uncredited)
1948	Arch of Triumph	German Woman	(uncredited)
