= Abilene Town =

1946 film

- Theatrical poster
- Directed by: Edwin L. Marin
- Written by: Ernest Haycox (novel "Trail Town")
- Screenplay by: Harold Shumate
- Produced by: Jules Levey
- Starring: Randolph Scott; Ann Dvorak; Edgar Buchanan; Rhonda Fleming; Lloyd Bridges
- Cinematography: Archie Stout
- Edited by: Richard V. Heermance
- Music by: Gerard Carbonara; Albert Glasser; Charles Koff; James Mayfield; Max Terr
- Production companies: Guild Productions; Jules Levy Presents
- Distributed by: United Artists
- Release date: January 11, 1946 (United States)
- Running time: 89 minutes
- Country: United States
- Language: English

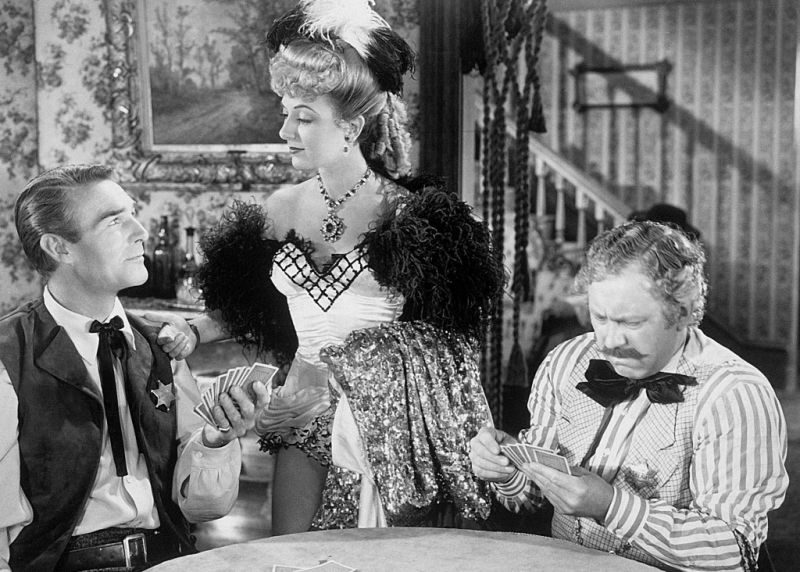
Randolph Scott, Ann Dvorak and Edgar Buchanan

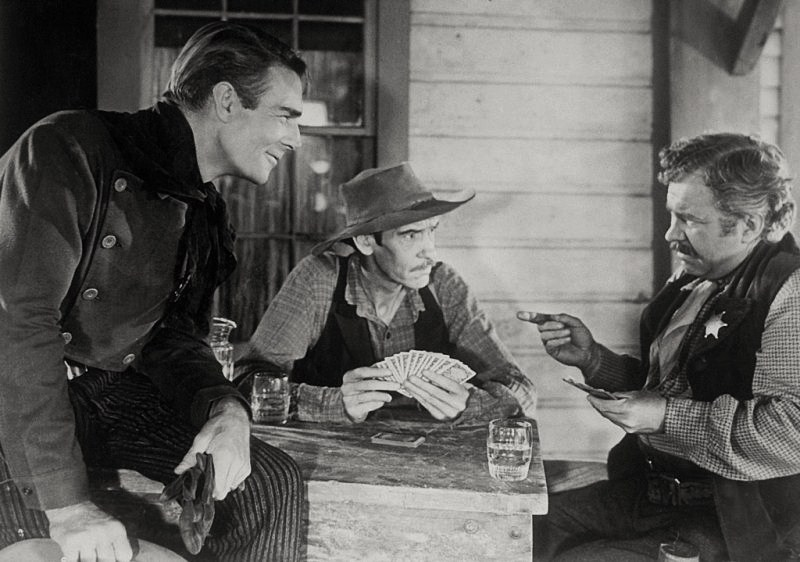
Randolph Scott, Guy Wilkerson and Edgar Buchanan

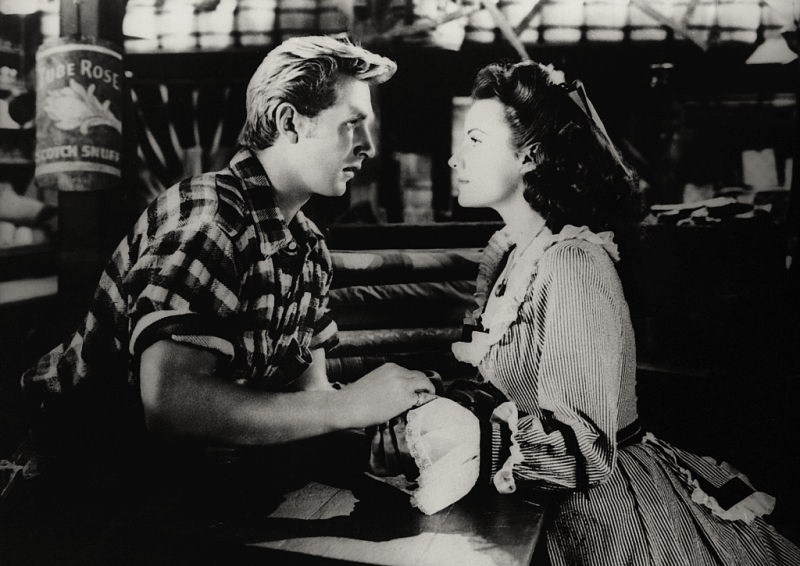
Lloyd Bridges and Rhonda Fleming

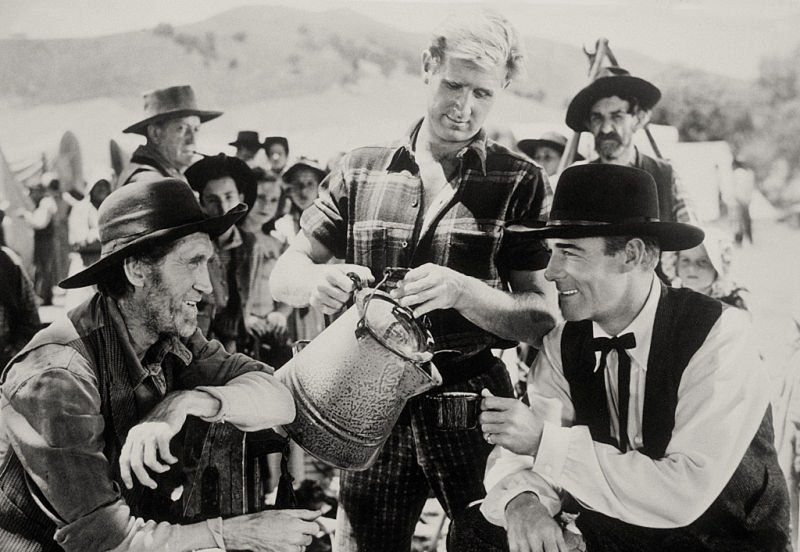
Lloyd Bridges (center) and Randolph Scott (right)

Abilene Town is a 1946 American Western film directed by Edwin L. Marin and starring Randolph Scott, Ann Dvorak, Edgar Buchanan, Rhonda Fleming and Lloyd Bridges. Adapted from Ernest Haycox's 1941 novel Trail Town, the production's plot is set in the Old West, in the cattle town of Abilene, Kansas in 1870.

== Plot ==
In the years following the Civil War, the state of Kansas is increasingly divided by opposing economic and social forces. Homesteaders are moving into the West, trying to start new lives, and their increasing presence is clashing with the established commercial interests of cattlemen, who had settled in the region before the war. Abilene, a major cattle town, is on the brink of armed conflict between the cattlemen and the homesteaders, and the town marshal, Dan Mitchell, strives to keep the peace between those two groups as well as maintain the uneasy coexistence between Abilene's townspeople and the ranchers with their legion of cowboys. For years, the town had been literally divided, with the cattlemen and their supporters occupying one side of the main street and townspeople occupying the other side. Mitchell likes it this way; it makes things easier for him, and prevents dangerous confrontations from arising between the two factions. However, when homesteaders decide to lay stakes on the edge of town that existing balance is upset and leads to a deadly showdown.

The leader of the homesteaders is Henry Dreiser, a reasonable young man with common sense. The county sheriff, "Bravo" Trimble, is a lawman who would rather play cards than get involved in any real or potential unrest in Abilene. Mitchell, however, does strive to prevent the upcoming confrontation while also dealing with a clash in his personal life, which is divided as well between Rita, a flashy showgirl who works on the cattle drovers' side of the street, and Sherry, the modest, churchgoing daughter of a shopkeeper on the other side of the street.

== Cast ==
- Randolph Scott as Marshal Dan Mitchell
- Ann Dvorak as Rita
- Edgar Buchanan as Sheriff Bravo Trimble
- Rhonda Fleming as Sherry Balder
- Lloyd Bridges as Henry Dreiser
- Helen Boyce as Big Annie
- Howard Freeman as Ed Balder
- Richard Hale as Charlie Fair
- Jack Lambert as Jet Younger
- Dick Curtis as Cap Ryker
- Eddy Waller as Hannaberry
- Hank Patterson as Doug Neil
- Chubby Johnson as homesteader (uncredited in screen debut)
- Guy Wilkerson as card player with Sheriff Trimble (uncredited)

== Reception ==
The film received generally positive reviews in newspapers and trade publications in 1946. In its January 9 review that year, the widely read New York-based entertainment paper Variety called the production a "rip-snorting, spectacular meller" that is action-packed with a "tight screenplay". The Film Daily, another trade paper at the time, judged the production to be "a super-western" that succeeded "in capturing the hell-roaring spirit that marked the expansion of the United States westward". The reviewing service Harrison's Reports was more understated in its assessment of the film, characterizing it as a "fairly good Western", although the trade journal did admire its "fast-moving" plot and Randolph Scott's steadfast performance, observing that he "plays the fearless marshal with conviction". Mae Tinee, the critic for the Chicago Tribune in 1946, headlined her January 24 review "'Abilene Town' Among Better Western Films". In that appraisal Tinee compliments the production's attention to detail but expresses disappointment with the latter portion of the film, especially with regard to its ending:

For the first two-thirds of this film, it is a better-than-average western. Adapted from a novel by Ernest Haycox, "Abilene Town" has a capable cast. This story of the fight between the cattle men and the homesteaders has a good deal of authenticity as to detail. The saloons look like saloons. The chorus girls are lumpy and not expensively costumed. They do the same show, featuring the same songs and musical numbers for a couple of nights running. Ann Dvorak dances in white high buttoned, high heeled shoes which actually look as tho [sic] they might have been the height of fashion in 1870. The bad man looks really bad. The hero stops to rest, panting and sweating, after a rough and tumble fight with the villain...It is only in the last part of the picture that the corn starts to flourish, and the ending is too sweet for words. There is plenty of shootin' and fightin' and a very realistic cattle stampede. The average Western fan undoubtedly will be happy with "Abilene Town."

== Home media ==
Abilene Town's initial copyright was not renewed and expired at the end of 1974. Consequently, there have been many poor quality public domain releases on VHS and DVD from reduction prints. However, in 2015 Russel Cowe of Scotland-based label Panamint Cinema located the original negatives which became the basis of a restoration released on region-free Blu-ray.
