= Hollywood Barn Dance =

1947 film

- Directed by: Bernard B. Ray
- Produced by: Jack Schwarz executive Robert L. Lippert
- Music by: Walter Greene
- Production company: Jack Schwartz Productions
- Distributed by: Screen Guild Productions
- Release date: June 21, 1947
- Running time: 72 minutes
- Country: United States
- Language: English

Hollywood Barn Dance is a 1947 American film starring Ernest Tubb. It was based on the CBS radio program of the same name, which was originally hosted by Cottonseed Clark, which, in turn, was a "replacement" for Gene Autry's Melody Ranch radio show, aired while the famed singing cowboy was serving in the Army Air Force during World War II.

Jack Schwarz bought the film rights in 1947.

== Cast ==
- Ernest Tubb as himself
- Lori Talbott as Helen
- The Texas Troubadours
- Helen Boyce
