= Richard Hale =

American character actor (1892–1981)

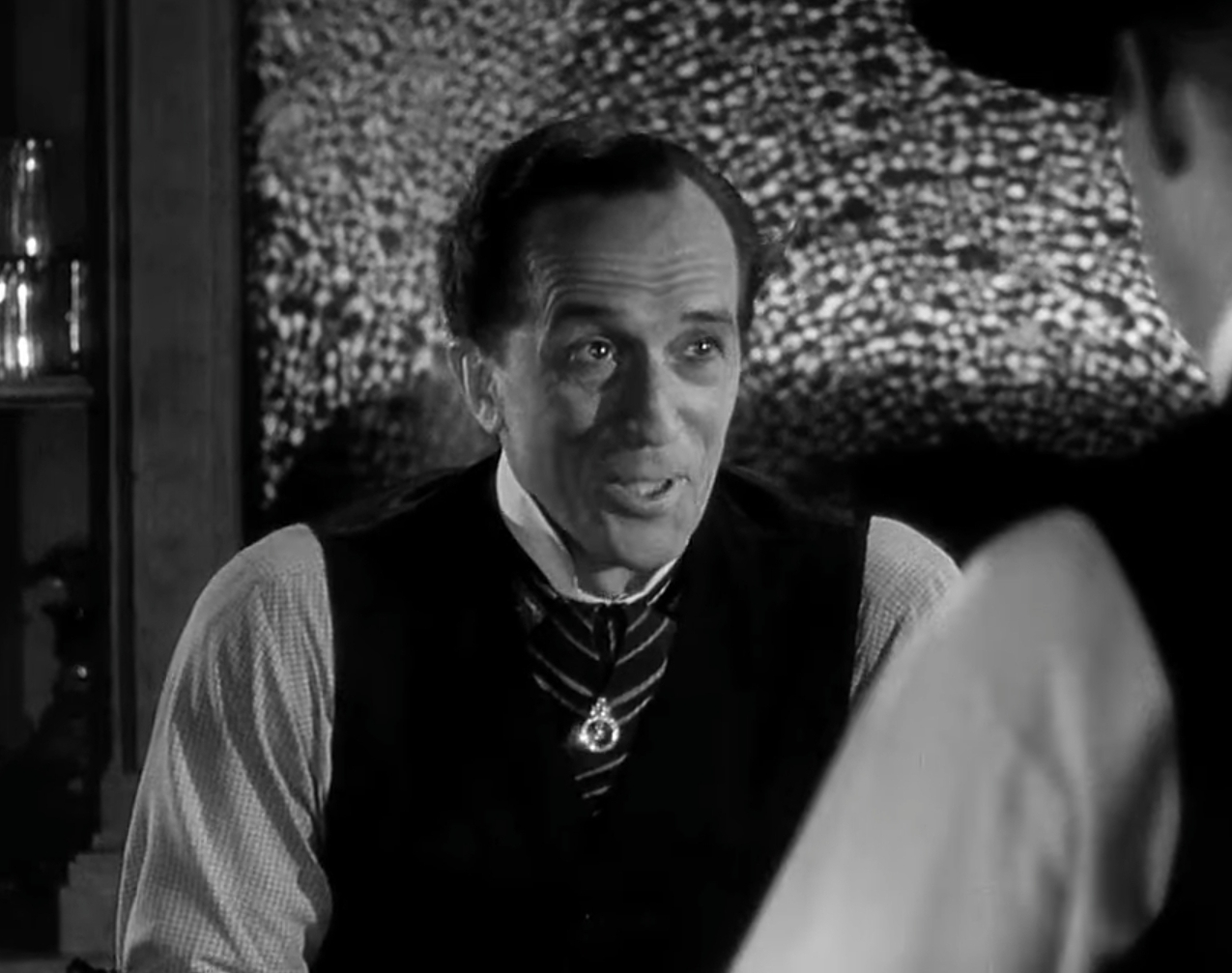
- Hale in Abilene Town (1946)
- Born: James Richards Hale; November 16, 1892; Rogersville, Tennessee, U.S.
- Died: May 18, 1981 (aged 88); Los Angeles, California, U.S.
- Occupations: Actor; Narrator; Singer
- Years active: 1914–1978
- Spouse(s): Temple Duncan, 1918–1922; Fiona O'Shiel Hale

Richard Hale (born James Richards Hale; November 16, 1892 – May 18, 1981) was an American opera and concert singer and later a character actor in film, stage and television. Hale's appearance often landed him roles as Middle Eastern or Native American characters.

== Life and career ==
Born in Rogersville, Tennessee, Hale attended Columbia University on a singing scholarship. Upon graduation in 1914, he turned down an offer to join Columbia's English department, choosing instead to join Minnie Maddern Fiske's theater group. Hale's 1921 debut at Aeolian Hall began a successful career in opera as a baritone; he toured Europe and the United States. The 1927 New York Times film review of The Unknown credits "Richard Hale, baritone" as singing "The Pirate's Frolic".

During the 1930s, Hale performed at the Berkshire Playhouse in Stockbridge, Massachusetts. For the summer of 1931 he was in Denver, playing in summer stock at the Elitch Theatre. Hale also narrated the American premiere of Peter and the Wolf by Sergei Prokofiev, at Symphony Hall, Boston, with Prokofiev himself conducting. Hale was also the narrator for Arthur Fiedler's 1953 RCA recording of the same music with the Boston Pops.

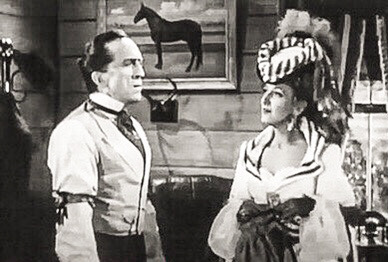
Hale and Ann Dvorak in Abilene Town (1946)

In later life, he turned more and more to acting. His most notable role was in the 1956 film Friendly Persuasion, starring Gary Cooper. He was the soothsayer warning "Beware the Ides of March!" in the Shakespeare film Julius Caesar (1953). In All the King's Men his character's name was Richard Hale. Hale also appeared in To Kill a Mockingbird (1962) as the sinister neighbor Nathan Radley, and was known for his portrayal of Father Manuel Ferreira in The Miracle of Our Lady of Fatima. He made four guest appearances on Perry Mason, including in 1957 for the show's third episode "The Case of the Nervous Accomplice" (as murder victim George Lutts), and as general store owner Robert Tepper in the 1960 episode "The Case of the Violent Village". Other television appearances include Maverick (in an episode written and directed by Robert Altman), Cheyenne, Rawhide, Daniel Boone, Green Acres, Petticoat Junction, Bonanza, Gunsmoke, The Wild Wild West (as Sedgewick in the fourth-season episode "The Night of the Sedgewick Curse"), Star Trek (as Goro in the third-season episode "The Paradise Syndrome"), Harry O (as Jud Kane in the second-season episode "Victim"), Adam-12, Here Come the Brides (as "the old Indian" in the second-season episode "The Last Winter"), and as Uncle Gilbert (the 'Creature from the Black Lagoon') on an episode of The Munsters.

His death, aged 88, was related to cardiovascular disease.

== Partial filmography ==
- None Shall Escape (1944) – Rabbi David Levin
- Knickerbocker Holiday (1944) – Tammany
- The Girl in the Case (1944) – John Heyser
- Counter-Attack (1945) – General Kalinev (uncredited)
- A Thousand and One Nights (1945) – Kofir
- Abilene Town (1946) – Charlie Fair
- Badman's Territory (1946) – Ben Wade
- The Devil's Mask (1946) – Curator Raymond Halliday (uncredited)
- The Man Who Dared (1946) – Reginald Fogg
- The Other Love (1947) – Professor Linnaker
- Queen Esther: A Story from the Bible (1947) – Mordecai
- Port Said (1948) – Mario Giustano
- Life of St. Paul Series (1949) – Sergius Paulus
- The Beautiful Blonde from Bashful Bend (1949) – Mr. Gus Basserman (uncredited)
- All the King's Men (1949) – Hale (uncredited)
- The Pilgrimage Play (1949) – Pontius Pilate
- Convicted (1950) – Judge (uncredited)
- The Desert Hawk (1950) – Imam, the Holy One (uncredited)
- Kim (1950) – Hassan Bey
- Inside Straight (1951) – Mr. Deering (uncredited)
- Soldiers Three (1951) – Govind-Lal
- Night Into Morning (1951) – Judge (uncredited)
- The Law and the Lady (1951) – Sheriff (uncredited)
- Angels in the Outfield (1951) – Dr. Blane, Psychiatrist (uncredited)
- The Unknown Man (1951) – Cocktail Party Guest (uncredited)
- The Man with a Cloak (1951) – Durand
- Flame of Araby (1951) – King Chandra (uncredited)
- Young Man with Ideas (1952) – Vishto (uncredited)
- Scaramouche (1952) – Perigore
- When in Rome (1952) – Professor Homer Sandway (uncredited)
- The Miracle of Our Lady of Fatima (1952) – Father Ferreira
- Caribbean (1952) – Ship's Doctor (uncredited)
- Springfield Rifle (1952) – General Halleck (uncredited)
- Rogue's March (1953) – Igor, Russian Emissary
- San Antone (1953) – Abraham Lincoln
- Julius Caesar (1953) – Soothsayer
- The Vanquished (1953) – Colonel (uncredited)
- Sea of Lost Ships (1953) – Captain Welch
- The Diamond Queen (1953) – Gabriel Tavernier
- Red Garters (1954) – Dr. J. Pott Troy
- Passion (1954) – Don Domingo (uncredited)
- Drum Beat (1954) – General Sherman (uncredited)
- Jupiter's Darling (1955) – Auctioneer (uncredited)
- Canyon Crossroads (1955) – Joe Rivers
- Moonfleet (1955) – Starkill
- A Man Alone (1955) – Judge Witham (uncredited)
- Pillars of the Sky (1956) – Isaiah
- Friendly Persuasion (1956) – Purdy
- Short Cut to Hell (1957) – AT
- Voice in the Mirror (1958) – Gaunt Man (uncredited)
- Ben-Hur (1959) – Gaspar (uncredited)
- Alfred Hitchcock Presents (1961) (Season 6 Episode 18: "The Greatest Monster of Them All") - Ernst von Croft
- Sergeants 3 (1962) – White Eagle
- Tower of London (1962) – Tyrus
- To Kill a Mockingbird (1962) – Nathan Radley
- The Alfred Hitchcock Hour (1964) (Season 2 Episode 30: "The Second Verdict") - Judge Lincoln Arthur
- Good Neighbor Sam (1964) – Mr. Bernier (uncredited)
- Scandalous John (1971) – Old Indian
- The Limit (1972) – Man in Park
- One Little Indian (1973) – Old Indian
- Rafferty and the Gold Dust Twins (1975) – Reverend Culpepper, The Jesus Freak
- Escape to Witch Mountain (1975) – Bolt's Servant (uncredited)
- Family Plot (1976) – A.A. Adamson (uncredited)
- Evil Town (1987) – Lester Wylie
