= Michael Ansara =

American actor (1922–2013)

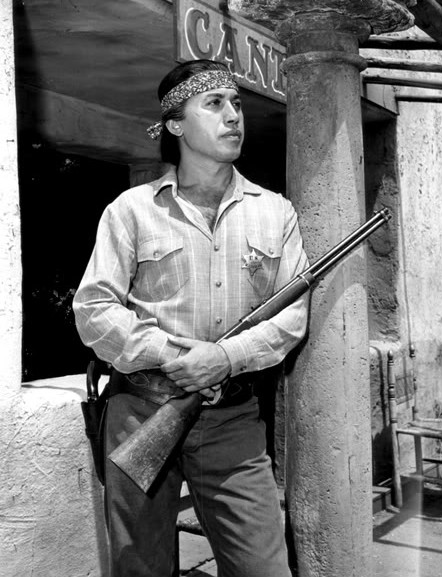
- Ansara in Law of the Plainsman (1959)
- Born: April 15, 1922; French Mandate of Syria (present-day Syria)
- Died: July 31, 2013 (aged 91); Calabasas, California, U.S.
- Resting place: Forest Lawn Memorial Park, Hollywood Hills, U.S.
- Education: Los Angeles City College
- Occupation: Actor
- Years active: 1944–2001
- Spouses: Jean Byron (m. 1955; div. 1956) Barbara Eden (m. 1958; div. 1974) Beverly Kushida (m. 1977)
- Children: 1
- Awards: Hollywood Walk of Fame, Western Heritage Award, Saturn Award

Michael George Ansara (Arabic: مايكل جورج عنصرة, romanized: Māykil Jōrj ʾAnṣara; April 15, 1922 – July 31, 2013) was a Syrian‐American actor. He was often cast in Arab and Native American roles. His work in both film and television spanned several genres, including historical epics, Westerns, and science fiction.

He portrayed Cochise in the television series Broken Arrow 1956-1958, Deputy U.S. Marshal Sam Buckhart in the NBC series Law of the Plainsman, Commander Kang in Star Trek: The Original Series, Star Trek: Deep Space Nine, and Star Trek: Voyager, Kane in the 1979–1981 series Buck Rogers in the 25th Century, and provided the voice for Mr. Freeze in the DC Animated Universe.

Ansara was married three times, each time to an actress. He was first married to Jean Byron, who played Patty Duke's mother on The Patty Duke Show. They divorced in 1956. While starring in the Broken Arrow series, he met and married Barbara Eden. They appeared in the 1961 film Voyage to the Bottom of the Sea together, and Ansara appeared in several episodes of Eden's series, I Dream of Jeannie. They had one son together before divorcing in 1974. His final marriage was to Beverly Kushida in 1977, and they remained together until his death in 2013.

Ansara received a star on the Hollywood Walk of Fame for his work in the television industry, located at 6666 Hollywood Boulevard.

== Early life ==
Michael George Ansara was born in a small village in Syria (then a French mandate), and his family emigrated to the United States when he was two years old. Ansara's family lived in Lowell, Massachusetts, before moving to California when he was ten. He originally wanted to be a physician, but developed a passion for becoming a performer after he began taking acting classes at Pasadena Playhouse to overcome his shyness. He was educated at Los Angeles City College, from which Ansara earned an Associate of Arts degree. Ansara served as a medic in the army during World War II.

== Career ==
Everything I have done, even the bad guys, I try to give the character a sense of honor and believability.

— Michael Ansara

Ansara's early roles were primarily bit parts. Being Syrian-American, he was often cast as an Arabic character, including his screen debut in the role of Hamid in the 1944 RKO Radio Pictures film Action in Arabia, The Desert Hawk (1950), and Soldiers Three (1951). This all changed when he performed in a Pasadena Playhouse production of Montserrat. A talent scout from Warner Brothers saw the performance and Ansara was signed for the role of "Tuscos" in Only the Valiant (1951). After that, he was often typecast as an American Indian.

=== Epic films ===
Ansara appeared in several biblical epics including The Robe (1953) as Judas Iscariot, The Ten Commandments (1956) as a taskmaster, and The Greatest Story Ever Told (1965) as Herod the Great's commander. Ansara credits The Robe (1953) as the role that established him as a serious actor.

In 1953, he was cast in Serpent of the Nile along with his first wife, actress Jean Byron. That same year he appeared as Pindarus in Joseph Mankiewicz's big screen adaptation of Julius Caesar, with Marlon Brando, James Mason and John Gielgud.

Ansara also appeared in other biblical films, including Queen Esther: A Story from the Bible (1947) and Slaves of Babylon (1953), which was based on the biblical story of Daniel.

=== Westerns ===
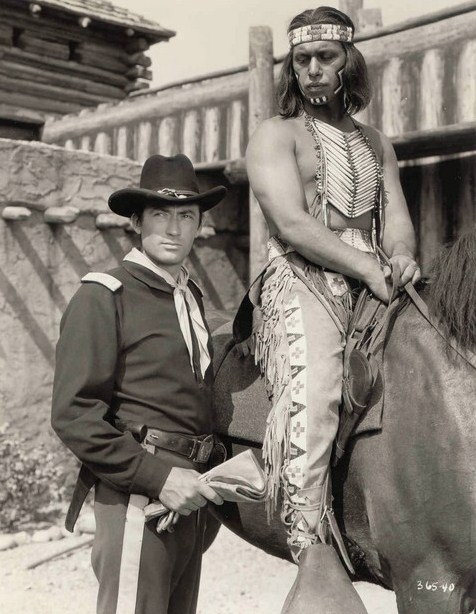
Gregory Peck and Michael Ansara in Only the Valiant (1951)

Following his role in Only the Valiant, Ansara appeared in several Western films, including Brave Warrior (1952), The Lawless Breed (1953), Three Young Texans (1954), The Lone Ranger (1956), and Pillars of the Sky (1956).

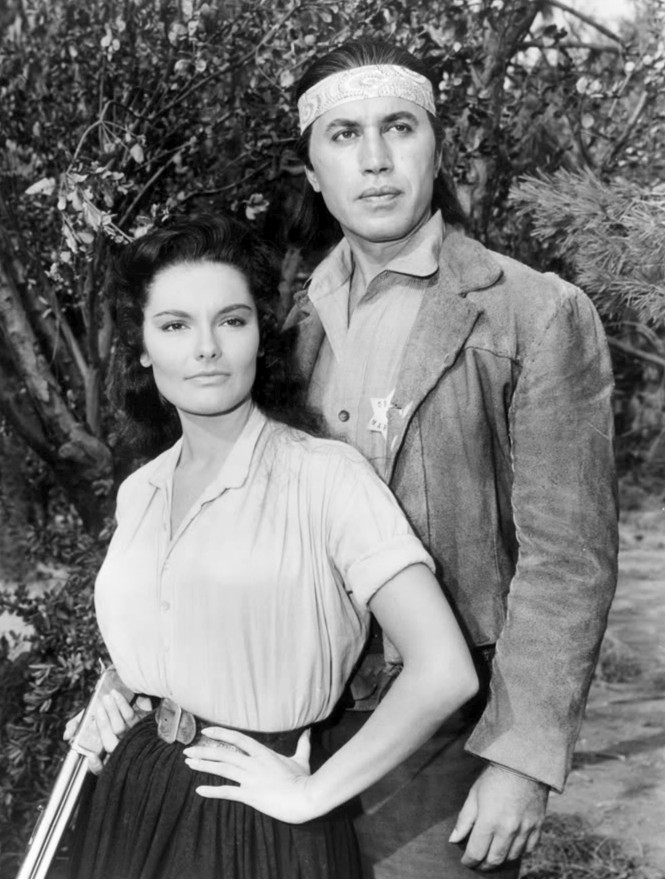
Michael Ansara and Suzanne Lloyd in Law of the Plainsman (1962)

The popularity of the Western film Broken Arrow starring James Stewart led to the creation of a television series of the same name in 1956. Mexican actor Ricardo Montalbán was cast in the lead role of Cochise for the pilot. However, Montalbán did not want to commit to a series, and after a screen test with 20th Century-Fox, Ansara was cast in the role. During a period of Hollywood filmmaking that displayed the American Indian as an adversary and savage, Ansara was one of the first actors to give dignity to the Native American role with his portrayal of Cochise, something that Ansara publicly stated as a reason he enjoyed the role. The role of Cochise gave Ansara wide public exposure. Although he received top billing, it was his portrayal of Cochise that he blamed for his later typecasting in Native American roles.

Ansara starred in the ABC-TV series Law of the Plainsman (1959–1960), with Gina Gillespie and Robert Harland. He performed as an Apache Indian named Sam Buckhart, who had been appointed as a U.S. Marshal. The series began as an episode of The Rifleman. This was the first American network series to feature an American Indian as a full-fledged lawman.

Ansara appeared in several other television Westerns, including The Rebel, Wagon Train, Rawhide, The Virginian, Branded, Daniel Boone, and Gunsmoke. He starred in several more Western films, including The Comancheros, Texas Across the River, and Guns of the Magnificent Seven.

In 1978, Ansara starred as Lame Beaver in the acclaimed miniseries Centennial, based on the novel by James A. Michener.

His final Western was Border Shootout (1990), starring Glenn Ford. It was also Ford's final Western.

=== Science fiction and fantasy ===
Not limited to a single genre, Ansara appeared in several science fiction and fantasy genre films and television series.

He appeared with Bud Abbott and Lou Costello in Abbott and Costello Meet the Mummy (1955).

He appeared in all of the Irwin Allen television series. This included two episodes of the television series Voyage to the Bottom of the Sea after having starred in the film of the same name, The Outer Limits, Lost in Space, The Time Tunnel, and Land of the Giants.

He played the recurring role of Killer Kane in the 1979–1980 season of Buck Rogers in the 25th Century. The role had originally been played by Henry Silva in the 1979 pilot movie.

I loved the part of Kang. I loved doing it, even though you never know how good a role is going to turn out until you see the final product.

— Michael Ansara

In the science fiction genre, he is noted for appearing as the Klingon commander Kang. His first appearance as Kang was in the original Star Trek series ("Day of the Dove"), followed by appearances of the same character in two other Star Trek television series, Deep Space Nine ("Blood Oath") and Voyager ("Flashback"). He is one of seven actors to play the same character on three Star Trek television series. In 1994, Ansara portrayed the Technomage "Elric" in the Babylon 5 episode "The Geometry of Shadows".

=== Appearances with Barbara Eden ===
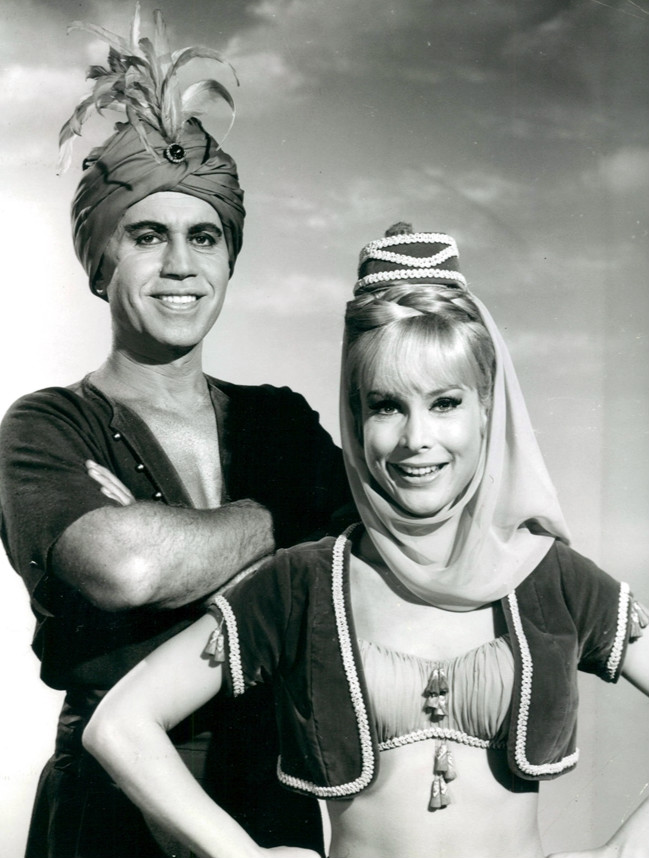
Michael Ansara with wife Barbara Eden in I Dream of Jeannie

While making the Broken Arrow series, the 20th Century-Fox publicity department arranged a date between Ansara and actress Barbara Eden, whom he later married. In 1961, Ansara co-starred with Eden in the film Voyage to the Bottom of the Sea. In 1966, Ansara guest-starred as the Blue Djinn on Eden's sitcom, I Dream of Jeannie. He appeared with Eden two more times in the series, as King Kamehameha in the 1968 episode "The Battle of Waikīkī", and as Major Biff Jellico in the episode "My Sister, the Home Wrecker". He directed the series' penultimate episode, "One Jeannie Beats Four of a Kind". Later, in 1973, he produced the pilot for The Barbara Eden Show.

=== Other notable work ===
Ansara starred in Infidel Caesar with the silent film actor Ramon Novarro at the Music Box Theater on Broadway. The show, which closed after two preview performances on April 27–28, 1962, was a modern retelling of Shakespeare's Julius Caesar set in modern Cuba.

In the 1970s, Ansara appeared in a number of low budget exploitation films, including Dear Dead Delilah (1972), Day of the Animals (1977), and The Manitou (1978). He received top billing in the Z movie called The Doll Squad (1973).

In 1976, Ansara starred in the historical epic Mohammad, Messenger of God (also titled The Message), about the origin of Islam and the message of the Islamic prophet Muhammad.

Ansara was also known for his voice work. He voiced the Ancient One in the 1978 television film Dr. Strange. He was a narrator on the PBS series Reading Rainbow. He was the voice of Mr. Freeze in two episodes of Batman: The Animated Series, the animated film Batman & Mr. Freeze: SubZero, The New Batman Adventures, Batman Beyond, and the video game Batman: Vengeance.

== Awards and honors ==
Ansara was nominated for a Saturn Award, and has won a Western Heritage Award for Rawhide.

On February 8, 1960, Ansara received a star on the Hollywood Walk of Fame for his work in the television industry, located at 6666 Hollywood Boulevard.

== Personal life and death ==
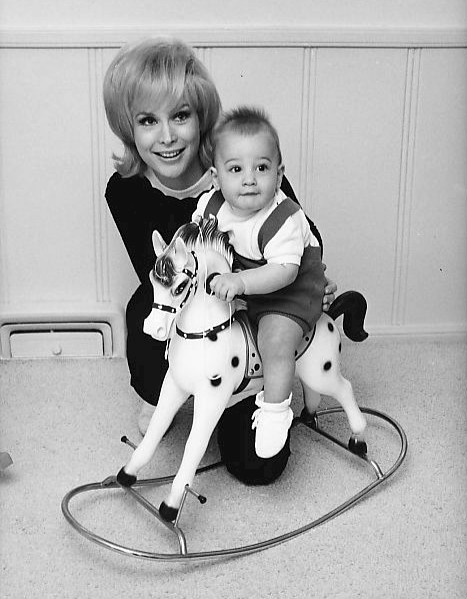
Wife Barbara Eden and their son Matthew (1966)

Ansara's first marriage was to actress Jean Byron in 1949. They appeared in the film Serpent of the Nile together. Ansara and Byron divorced in 1956.

In 1957, when Ansara was starring in the Broken Arrow television series, Booker McClay at Twentieth Century Fox arranged for him to be seen dating How to Marry a Millionaire star, Barbara Eden. At the time, Eden was already dating someone, but he was not an actor. The studio thought it was good for publicity for each of them to be seen with another star. Ansara was not initially interested. He was already a Hollywood heartthrob with female fans around the world. Ansara married Eden in 1958. They co-starred in Irwin Allen's Voyage to the Bottom of the Sea in 1961. They also appeared together in the 1964 comedy film, Seven Different Ways. The couple had a son, Matthew Ansara. In every episode of I Dream of Jeannie, Eden wore a diamond pendant necklace that had been given to her by Ansara. According to Eden in her 2011 autobiography, it was to keep Michael close to her heart. During I Dream of Jeannie, Ansara was working less and Eden was working more, so there was a divergence in their earning power. The loss of their second child, their diverging careers, and the shift in their earning power strained their marriage. Ansara and Eden eventually divorced in 1974.

He married actress Beverly Kushida in 1977. They appeared together in The Manitou. They remained married until Ansara's death.

On June 25, 2001, his son Matthew died from a heroin overdose in Monrovia, California.

Ansara died from complications of Alzheimer's disease at his home in Calabasas on July 31, 2013, at the age of 91. His interment is at Forest Lawn Memorial Park in the Hollywood Hills of Los Angeles, next to his son Matthew.
