= List of I Dream of Jeannie episodes =

I Dream of Jeannie is an American fantasy sitcom starring Barbara Eden as a 2,000-year-old genie and Larry Hagman as an astronaut who becomes her master, with whom she falls in love and whom she eventually marries. Produced by Screen Gems, the series originally aired from September 1965 to May 1970 on NBC. The series ran for five seasons and produced 139 episodes. The first season consisted of 30 episodes filmed in black-and-white, then colorized later in 2006 for DVD release by Sony. All later seasons were filmed in color.

== Series overview ==
Season	Episodes	Originally released	
Season	Episodes	First released	Last released
1	30	September 18, 1965	May 9, 1966
2	31	September 12, 1966	April 24, 1967
3	26	September 12, 1967	March 26, 1968
4	26	September 16, 1968	May 12, 1969
5	26	September 16, 1969	May 26, 1970
TV movies		October 20, 1985	October 20, 1991

== Episodes ==
=== Season 1 (1965–66) ===
All first-season episodes were originally filmed in black-and-white, but were colorized subsequently for the Sony DVD releases and some syndication airings.

Note: The signature head-nod-and-blink with arms crossed in an uplifted pose indicates that Jeannie is invoking magic. (In some cases she leaves her arms unmoved.) For this article, the term "blink" denotes that her literal eye blink is associated with an act of magic.

Season 1 episodes
No. overall	No. in season	Title	Directed by	Written by	Original release date
1	1	"The Lady in the Bottle"	Gene Nelson	Sidney Sheldon	September 18, 1965
After orbiting the Earth in Stardust One, Air Force captain and astronaut Tony Nelson crash lands on a remote island in the South Pacific. As he's building an "SOS" message in the sand, he notices a mysterious bottle that repeatedly rolls by itself. Curious, Captain Nelson opens the bottle and burnishes the outside, whereupon a thick column of smoke streams out. A beautiful genie appears who pledges her service to him, helps him get rescued and then follows him back to Cocoa Beach, Florida. Philip Ober appears as General Wingard Stone, the father of Tony's fiancée Melissa (Karen Sharpe). Richard Reeves as 1st Garbage Man. Joe Higgins as 2nd Garbage Man. Don Dubbins as Lt. Pete Conway, USNR. Filming date: December 2–4, 1964
2	2	"My Hero?"	Gene Nelson	Sidney Sheldon	September 25, 1965
Jeannie whisks Captain Nelson off to ancient Persia in order to have him avenge her honor against the immense Ali, Killer of Giants (Richard Kiel). When Captain Nelson sticks up for her, Jeannie interprets it as a marriage proposal and blinks off to inform her parents that she's engaged to Captain Nelson (leaving him in Ali's clutches) and intends to marry him—assuming he survives Ali. Guest stars: Henry Corden as Jeannie's Father. Florence Sundstrom appears as Jeannie's Mother. Peter Brocco as Turhan. Magda Harout as Woman.
3	3	"Guess What Happened on the Way to the Moon?"	Alan Rafkin	Tom Waldman, Frank Waldman	October 2, 1965
Desert survival takes a luxurious turn when Jeannie follows Tony (Captain Nelson) and Captain Roger Healey (Tony's friend and NASA partner) on a desert survival mission, and supplies Tony with food, shelter and transportation, which he must hide from Roger. After Tony injures his ankle, he stays behind as Roger goes on. After the mission, Roger questions Tony's easy time while he himself languished in the desert heat. Byron Morrow appears as General Moore.
4	4	"Jeannie and the Marriage Caper"	Alan Rafkin	Tom Waldman, Frank Waldman	October 9, 1965
When Tony's prospective father-in-law accepts an ambassadorship, he offers Tony a prestigious position, but Tony is set on staying an astronaut and turns down the offer. His fiancée, Melissa, urges him to accept the position and move up their wedding date. When Melissa's old friend Grover Caldwell (John Hudson) enters the picture, she transfers her interest to him, believing that Tony lacks ambition and has changed from the man she'd known. But Tony's had second thoughts too and hides his relief when Melissa tells him of her plan to marry Grover. Guest Star: Mako as Kato
5	5	"G.I. Jeannie"	Alan Rafkin	William Davenport	October 16, 1965
Jeannie misses Tony because he's working long hours, so she proposes that she become his secretary. Tony, seeing an opportunity to get Jeannie out of his hair for a while, tells her that she would be required to join the Air Force first. So Jeannie agrees to go through WAF training, after which her commanding officer (Jane Dulo) tries her in various departments but she's disastrous at each. Edmon Ryan appears as Col. Joe Fenton. Eileen O'Neill appears as Corp. Lola Burns. Robert DoQui appears as Sgt. Pete Morgan.
6	6	"The Yacht Murder Case"	Gene Nelson	David Braverman, Bob Marcus	October 23, 1965
Jeannie follows Tony on a yacht trip with P.J. Ferguson (David Brian), an aerospace executive, and his daughter Nina (Sharon Farrell) after Nina, who has designs on Tony, presses her father to hire him away from NASA. When Tony orders Jeannie to go home and she obeys with a magic blink, the Fergusons, who'd already caught a glimpse of them talking, conclude from her sudden disappearance that Tony has murdered her. C. Lindsay Workman appears as General William Fletcher. Sandra Gould appears as Mrs. Flaherty, Tony's housekeeper. Richard Webb appears as Colonel Brady. Victoria Carroll appears as Young Woman.
7	7	"Anybody Here Seen Jeannie?"	Gene Nelson	Arnold Horwitt	October 30, 1965
Tony is scheduled to be the first American to walk in space, but the ever suspicious Dr. Bellows, the base psychiatrist and Tony's superior officer, orders him to repeat a series of medical tests first. Jeannie thinks the mission is too dangerous so tries to get Tony grounded by sabotaging the tests from her hiding place in his jacket pocket. Tony's furious when he realizes what's happened so Jeannie undoes her work by tricking Bellows into thinking he's temporarily lost his marbles and can't trust his own findings. Dabney Coleman guest stars as Lt. George Conway (identified as "Lt. George Webb" in the closing credits). Davis Roberts appears as Walter, an assistant to Dr. Bellows.
8	8	"The Americanization of Jeannie"	Gene Nelson	Arnold Horwitt	November 6, 1965
Jeannie becomes enthralled by a magazine article that explains how to be a modern, emancipated American woman. She hopes to impress Tony by following the lessons in the article, but trying to mold her magical abilities and personality into a figure of modern womanhood produces mixed results. Steven Geray appears as Armand. Del Moore appears as Sam. Mittie Lawrence appears as Woman Shopper #3.
9	9	"The Moving Finger"	Gene Nelson	Harry Essex, Jerry Seelen	November 13, 1965
Tony is ordered to Hollywood to act as technical director for a film about astronauts. The film is to star a famous screen actress (Nancy Kovack), of whom Jeannie quickly becomes jealous when she observes the actress's attentions to Tony. Jeannie fashions herself as a movie star to compete with the Hollywood star, but sadly soon discovers that genies do not show up on film. David McLean appears as Jason Huberts. Woodrow Parfrey appears as Henry Tracy. Stephen Whittaker appears as Bellboy. Joe Brooks appears as Crane Driver.
10	10	"Djinn and Water"	Gene Nelson	Mary C. McCall, Jr.	November 20, 1965
Jeannie blinks one of her great grandfathers, Bilejik (J. Carrol Naish), to Cocoa Beach to help Tony with his pet project of turning sea water into fresh water. Bilejik has a secret method, but will only share it if Tony produces an extravagant gift in return—like, for example, the Statue of Liberty—so Jeannie intervenes to make her ancestor play fair. Tony is thrilled with a sample produced by Bilejik's procedure, but soon discovers it has a fatal flaw. Chet Stratton (uncredited) appears as the botanist.
11	11	"Whatever Became of Baby Custer?"	Gene Nelson	Austin Kalish, Irma Kalish	November 27, 1965
Tony's littlest fan, his eight-year-old neighbor Custer (Bill Mumy), sees some of Jeannie's magic and reports it to his parents, the Jamisons (Herb Voland, Grace Albertson). They pay Tony a visit to get an explanation, and he manages to satisfy them. Fed up with their son's fabrications, the Jamisons seek psychiatric help from Dr. Bellows, who's keen to hear details of what Custer has seen. Dr. Bellows, thinking he will finally find out what Tony's game is, gets Custer to continue to spy on Tony. When Custer goes missing, Tony suspects Jeannie is responsible. Note: The interior of Tony's neighbor's house is the interior set from Bewitched.
12	12	"Where'd You Go-Go?"	E.W. Swackhamer	Bob Fisher, Arthur Alsberg	December 4, 1965
Jeannie gets jealous when one of Tony's ex-girlfriends, Diane (Elizabeth MacRae), comes to town and wants a date with him. When Jeannie accidentally bumps into Roger, she agrees to a date with him, hoping to get Tony's attention. Now jealousy is spreading as Tony uses his date with Diane to make sure Jeannie doesn't get into trouble with Roger. Roger, who fancies himself a ladies' man, tries to put the moves on Jeannie but she blinks up defenses and runs off before he gets anywhere. Don Mitchell appears as a Sergeant.
13	13	"Russian Roulette"	E.W. Swackhamer	Bob Fisher, Arthur Alsberg	December 11, 1965
Roger takes Jeannie's bottle and, believing it to be a mere trinket, gifts it—with Jeannie inside—to visiting female Russian cosmonaut Sonya (Arlene Martel) as a token of friendship. Tony's attempts to recover the bottle fail, and soon Sonya discovers she has a genie. Tony and Jeannie come up with a plan to trick Sonya and get the bottle back. Paul Reed appears as General Barkley. John Beck appears as Sergeant. George DeNormand appears as Airline Pilot. Note: The DVD/Blu-ray releases and syndication prints feature a reconstructed soundtrack with new laugh track and recreated musical score.
14	14	"What House Across the Street?"	Theodore J. Flicker	Bob Fisher, Arthur Alsberg	December 18, 1965
Jeannie seeks the advice of her mother (Lurene Tuttle) on how to get Tony to marry her. She advises Jeannie to get Tony jealous by accepting a marriage proposal from Roger. Wise to the situation, Tony contrives to get Roger wondering who and where his future in-laws are, believing he'll be deterred by Jeannie's lack of a normal pair of parents. So Jeannie blinks up two rich "parents" (Oliver McGowan and Avis Scott) and a mansion across the street from Tony's house—on a vacant lot Dr. Bellows has just purchased. Jack Collins appears as General Hadley. Walter Woolf King appears as a minister.
15	15	"Too Many Tonys"	E.W. Swackhamer	Arthur Horwitt	December 25, 1965
Upon hearing that Dr. Bellows believes married men make more stable astronauts than bachelors do, Jeannie starts making wedding preparations. When Tony tells her it's not to be, she blinks up a version of him that's romantic and attentive to her. Dr. Bellows sees Jeannie with attentive Tony, who tells the Dr. that the two are about to be married. At the wedding, Tony pretends to be the romantic doppelgänger and Jeannie calls it off. Note: Soon-to-be regular (Barton MacLane) makes his first appearance as General Peterson in this episode. Guest Star: Henry Hunter as Chaplain
16	16	"Get Me to Mecca on Time"	E.W. Swackhamer	James Allardice, Tom Adair	January 8, 1966
Jeannie's powers are failing because it is "The Day of the Ram," on which every genie and her master must make a pilgrimage to Mecca to repeat the "sacred words" or the genie will lose her powers and disappear forever. Once there, they discover they must break into the First National Bank of Mecca in order to stand in the correct spot to recite the words, and are in danger of being captured by police before Tony can perform the incantation. Jamie Farr appears as Achmed, a pushy Mecca street guide. Foster Brooks appears as the Englishman. Alice Reinheart appears as "American Wife."
17	17	"The Richest Astronaut in the Whole Wide World"	E.W. Swackhamer	Story by : William Davenport; Teleplay by : Sidney Sheldon	January 15, 1966
Roger discovers Jeannie's true nature and steals her bottle. He has her blink him immense wealth and extravagant houses, cars and yachts. To undermine Roger's scheme, Tony arouses Dr. Bellows's suspicions by showing him Roger's new-found wealth, and now General Peterson (commanding officer of the base) wants Roger arrested on suspicion of selling government secrets. Tony offers to get Roger out of trouble on the condition that Roger return Jeannie to him.
18	18	"Is There an Extra Genie in the House?"	Hal Cooper	Charles Tannen	January 22, 1966
Roger crosses Dr. Bellows by keeping his niece (Judy Carne) out too late on a date, and in retribution, Dr. Bellows prepares to send Roger away for a month. Roger begs Tony to let Jeannie find a genie for him, but Tony declines. As he prepares for his banishment, Roger discovers two stage magicians illicitly taking up residence in his apartment and concludes Jeannie and Tony have granted his wish for his own genie after all. Herbie Faye (uncredited) appears as "Mr. Billings", Bernard Fox as Arnie, Emmaline Henry as Myrt. Note: Henry became a regular cast member the following season as Dr. Bellows's wife, Amanda Bellows.
19	19	"Never Try to Outsmart a Jeannie"	Herb Wallerstein	Martin A. Ragaway	January 29, 1966
Jeannie wants to accompany Tony on a three-week ocean voyage to Rome. Tony finally consents to let Jeannie go, but if she cannot manage to obtain a legal passport without using her magic she must agree to stay in her bottle on the trip. At the passport office, Jeannie's lack of identity documents forces her to try various schemes to get someone to act as a witness for her. Peter Brocco appears as the Passport Clerk.
20	20	"My Master, the Doctor"	Hal Cooper	Sidney Sheldon	February 5, 1966
Roger needs an appendectomy. After Tony tells Jeannie of his childhood dream to be a surgeon, she blinks him into a surgeon's getup in Roger's operating room, but before long Dr. Bellows begins to suspect that Tony is posing as the doctor. Jeannie plants herself in the hospital as a nurse, and as Dr. Bellows brings a skeptical Gen. Peterson to the operating room to expose Tony, she helps him escape the unmasking. Maureen McCormick appears as a girl patient in the hospital. Peter Leeds appears as a patient who makes unwanted advances towards Jeannie. Jane Dulo appears as a nurse.
21	21	"Jeannie and the Kidnap Caper"	Hal Cooper	Sidney Sheldon	February 12, 1966
Tony feels that Jeannie's magic is making him lazy at home so he makes her promise to say "Tough luck, Charlie" if he asks her for help. She agrees and takes an oath so that she can no longer help her master. The promise is ill-timed as Tony immediately is taken captive by deadly Chinese spies who are determined to get the plans for a top-secret project. Jeannie tells Roger what's afoot, who then tells Dr. Bellows. Dr. Bellows doesn't believe the story but plays along. Jeannie saves Tony by having Roger temporarily be her master. Guest Stars: James Hong as Chan, Richard Loo as Wong
22	22	"How Lucky Can You Get?"	Claudio Guzman	Sidney Sheldon	February 19, 1966
Tony and Roger are promoted to the rank of major. They're both sent on Air Force business to the Reno Nevada area, but Tony forbids Jeannie to go along. Seeing an opportunity to exploit Jeannie's powers to win big at gambling, Roger smuggles her in his luggage. At first, Jeannie helps Tony win big on a slot machine. Later, after blinking a long series of winning dice throws at the craps table, Jeannie's unfamiliarity with dice leads her to blink up impossible outcomes. The casino pit bosses see the shenanigans and haul Tony and Roger off. Guest Stars: Ted de Corsia as Mr. Phillips. Tim Herbert as Croupier.
23	23	"Watch the Birdie"	Hal Cooper	Sidney Sheldon	February 26, 1966
When Jeannie gives her Master a crack golf swing, General Peterson sees it and is so impressed that he recruits Tony as his partner for a game against a longtime rival. Tony has no skill at the game, but believes in true sportsmanship and forbids Jeannie to help. After the first disastrous holes in the rival game, Roger retrieves Jeannie, who digs Tony out of his very deep hole. Golf pro Jerry Barber appears as himself. Guest Stars: Ray Teal as Admiral Tugwell. Herbert Anderson appears as Commander Davis.
24	24	"The Permanent House Guest"	Hal Cooper	Sidney Sheldon	March 5, 1966
Disappointed that Tony never wishes for anything more exciting than bacon and eggs, Jeannie blinks an elephant into his bedroom, which Dr. Bellows immediately encounters. Dr. Bellows rushes to bring General Peterson back to show him and verify his stories about Tony, but it's gone by the time they arrive. Bellows, now determined to discover what's behind the inexplicable occurrences surrounding Tony—and to prove his own sanity—makes himself Tony's roommate to observe him up close. During the night Jeannie gets Dr. Bellows freaked out by playing a series of tricks on him and he flees. Guest Stars: Jack Davis as Commander Hastings. Kate Murtagh as Agnes.
25	25	"Bigger Than a Bread Box and Better Than a Genie"	Claudio Guzman	Sidney Sheldon	March 12, 1966
Tony is unimpressed by Roger's description of Madame Zolta, a self-proclaimed clairvoyant fortune teller who has gained Roger's confidence. Tony pretends to be skeptical when he meets her, but then to be taken in. Upon leaving the meeting, he agrees to attend a seance the Madame arranges. In the mean time Tony easily proves to Roger that the Madame is a phony. At the seance, Jeannie helps Tony expose her con. Col. Chuck Yeager guest stars, as well as Jorja Curtright (a.k.a. Mrs. Sidney Sheldon) and Natalie Leeb, Sidney's mother.
26	26	"My Master, the Great Rembrandt"	Claudio Guzman	Sidney Sheldon	March 19, 1966
Jeannie is eager for Tony's painting to do well at a charity auction, so turns his attempt at a Rembrandt copy into the real thing. Recognizing its authenticity, two art critics, Dr. Van Weesen (Jonathan Hole) and Dean Geller (Booth Colman), try to outbid each other for Tony's painting. After consulting with the experts, Dr. Bellows explains to Tony how he must be guilty of either conspiracy or theft, not to mention grand larceny. He then flies in the top Rembrandt expert in the world to verify the critics' claims but Jeannie stands in instead. Note: Filming date: January 11, 1966
27	27	"My Master, the Thief"	Claudio Guzman	Teleplay by Sidney Sheldon; Story by Sidney Sheldon & Robert Kaufman	April 2, 1966
Jeannie removes a pair of slippers from a museum that she recognizes as her own—but from 2,000 years earlier. Tony is on a short list of theft suspects, having been in the museum just before the theft. Dr. Bellows is sure Tony is the culprit but, as usual, his attempt to expose Tony in front of Gen. Peterson backfires. But Tony is still in hot water and explains to Jeannie that she must return the slippers or he's headed for a turn in jail. She refuses at first, but later assists Tony without his knowing as he and Roger break into the museum to get the slippers back in place.
28	28	"This Is Murder"	Hal Cooper	Sidney Sheldon	April 9, 1966
Tony is ordered to escort the visiting Princess Tarji (Gila Golan) around Cocoa Beach, but the assignment turns into a royal pain when Jeannie recognizes the princess as a member of a royal family who are sworn enemies of her own; she explains to Tony that she's taken an oath to kill anyone from the family. To protect the princess, Tony pretends to want a list of extravagant things (like a pineapple farm in Alaska) that he hopes will take Jeannie the duration of the visit to blink up. But Jeannie comes back sooner than expected and finds the Princess at Tony's house, and the fireworks commence. Vic Tayback appears as Turhan, the Princess's secretary.
29	29	"My Master, the Magician"	Hal Cooper	Sidney Sheldon	April 23, 1966
Dr. Bellows walks in on Tony floating in his armchair after Jeannie had levitated it to make him more comfortable. Tony explains that he's an amateur magician but Dr. Bellows is incredulous and forces Tony to prove his claim by performing in a NASA show for the personnel. Bellows brings in a famous magician to watch and explain how Tony levitates, and threatens Tony that if he doesn't levitate as he'd done at home, he'll haul Tony in front of Gen. Peterson and pin him down on what he's up to. With no magician skills, Tony flounders on stage but Jeannie helps him at the last minute, despite having promised not to.
30	30	"I'll Never Forget What's Her Name"	Hal Cooper	Sidney Sheldon	May 7, 1966
Tony gets amnesia—but only related to Jeannie—after being struck on the head by a falling vase, and becomes instantly infatuated with Jeannie on seeing her. Jeannie encourages Tony's affection but each time Roger tries to explain to Tony what's happened, she blinks him to a distant, inhospitable place. Jeannie allows the relationship to progress but her conscience gets the better of her as Tony arranges their wedding. A second knock to Tony's head undoes the first.

=== Season 2 (1966–67) ===
All episodes from season 2 on were filmed in color.

No. overall	No. in season	Title	Directed by	Written by	Original release date
31	1	"Happy Anniversary"	Claudio Guzman	Sidney Sheldon	September 12, 1966
To celebrate the first anniversary of their meeting, Jeannie arranges for Tony's orbital flight to splash down on the same desert island he'd found her on. Her plan is for Tony to re-enact his finding her bottle and letting her out. But this time Tony finds a bottle containing The Evil Blue Djinn (Michael Ansara), who was responsible for imprisoning Jeannie in her bottle 2,000 years earlier. Rather than being grateful for being liberated from his bottle, The Blue Djinn wants to kill his liberator. Tony finds Jeannie's bottle before The Blue Djinn can do away with him, and she blinks them both back to Cocoa Beach, but the Djinn follows. Tony tricks the Djinn several times before Jeannie manages to get rid of him. Note: Barbara Eden was married to Michael Ansara at the time this episode aired.
32	2	"Always on Sunday"	Hal Cooper	Sidney Sheldon	September 19, 1966
Determined to give her Master a well-deserved rest, Jeannie makes it so that every day is Sunday. But Tony is displeased, and Jeannie fears nothing she does is right. She leaves, believing she can never please Tony, but neglects to turn the calendar back on. Tony apologizes in hopes that she can hear him wherever she may be. Dr. Bellows overhears Tony's apology speech to Jeannie's bottle and wants an explanation. Tony is so despondent he promises to explain all to Dr. Bellows, but Jeannie returns in time to help Tony recast his promise.
33	3	"My Master, the Rich Tycoon"	Claudio Guzman	Sidney Sheldon	September 26, 1966
Jeannie aims to impress an unfamiliar house visitor by blinking up a few world-class artworks after he impugns Tony's taste in furnishings. But the visitor is Harry Huggins (Paul Lynde), an IRS man, who now believes he's uncovered a tax evader. Huggins jumps to conclusions, and when he finds Dr. Bellows, claims Tony is an international smuggler. They both pay a visit to Tony, but this time Dr. Bellows gets to watch someone else be the butt of a Nelson mystery as Jeannie peeps in on the visit and converts the art pieces to funny fakes. Maurice Dallimore (uncredited) appears as "Professor Preever", an art expert. Note: Filming Date: June 15, 1966
34	4	"My Master, the Rainmaker"	Claudio Guzman	Sidney Sheldon	October 3, 1966
The rain is ruining Tony and Jeannie's picnic plans so she plays with the weather and shows Tony she can even make it snow. To Tony's chagrin the snow falls only on his house, as the visiting Dr. Bellows soon discovers. Now Dr. Bellows believes Tony can change the weather at will. He spreads the word and a Sgt. Ben Roberts (Steve Ihnat) asks Tony if he might do something to end the drought at his brother's farm. Jeannie overhears, and before leaving for a visit with her family, tries to do a good deed by making it rain on the farm. Unfortunately she "leaves the water running" and the region is flooded.
35	5	"My Wild Eyed Master"	Hal Cooper	Sidney Sheldon	October 10, 1966
Tony strains his eyes while studying for a sub-orbital flight and fails an eye exam. Dr. Bellows orders him to take another exam the following morning as a condition on participating in the next NASA flight. During the exam, Jeannie tries to help but has trouble blinking up good eyesight and instead inflicts a series of eye conditions on Tony, including x-ray vision and near blindness. Tony winds up missing the flight but not all is lost.
36	6	"What's New, Poodle Dog?"	Hal Cooper	Sidney Sheldon	October 17, 1966
Roger tells Jeannie that he has arranged a double-date for Tony and himself with two beauty queens. Before Roger can tell Tony, Jeannie turns him into a French poodle whereupon he's immediately caught and taken to the pound. After some troubles at the pound, Tony manages to retrieve the poodle and bring him to the office. Unfortunately Dr. Bellows needs a dog to send into orbit and grabs the poodle for the job. After Tony convinces jealous Jeannie to change Roger back, Tony and Roger are set to date the beauty queens but Jeannie solves her problem by turning them into dogs too. Guest star: Dick Wilson as Mr. Wimple, who works at the dog pound.
37	7	"The Fastest Gun in the East"	Hal Cooper	Sidney Sheldon	October 24, 1966
While watching a TV Western Tony says he wishes he'd lived back in those days. Taking his wish literally, Jeannie blinks him back in time to be the marshal of an old wild west town. There, Tony takes up the cause of Eddie Sheridan (Eddie Firestone), who's been wrongly convicted of murder. Worse, a gang of outlaws wants to lynch Sheridan in order to get his land and cattle. Jeannie helps Tony save the day at a showdown with the bad guys. Hoyt Axton appears as Bull, one of bad guys. Guest star: Whit Bissell as Horace Sedgwick, the town banker and ringleader of the bad guys. Note: This was the first episode filmed in color (filming completed January 27, 1966)
38	8	"How to Be a Genie in 10 Easy Lessons"	Hal Cooper	Sidney Sheldon	October 31, 1966
Tony complains to Jeannie that she constantly makes mistakes and can't do anything right. After she tells him she's not had much practice as a genie, Tony has her read The Tales of the Arabian Nights believing it will act as a textbook on what genies do—and do not do. Not having read the book, Tony doesn't realize it's filled with stories of genies torturing their masters. Jeannie protests after reading a few chapters, but, still not getting the picture, Tony now insists she memorize it. When Jeannie tells Roger about the stories, he advises her to do just as the book says, believing it will lead to his getting Jeannie for himself.
39	9	"Who Needs a Green Eyed Jeannie?"	Hal Cooper	Sidney Sheldon	November 7, 1966
Tony pulls an elaborate trick on Jeannie in order to go out with an old flame (Joan Patrick) without Jeannie's knowing. Jeannie later figures out what's going on, but gets over her hurt feelings in time to help Tony when the old flame turns out to be the wife of a jealous mobster (Ted de Corsia) who's just escaped from prison and means to kill her.
40	10	"The Girl Who Never Had a Birthday: Part 1"	Claudio Guzman	Sidney Sheldon	November 14, 1966
As Jeannie and Tony plan a surprise party for Roger, she tells him she's never had a birthday party since she doesn't know her own birthdate. Tony sends her home to find out, but her family is of no help and there are no records. The situation turns critical as Jeannie's unhappiness causes her powers to weaken and her body to slowly vanish, feet first. Tony and Roger sneak in to see the Electronic Rapid Input Computer (ERIC) at NASA to calculate the birthdate. Just as ERIC prints it out, Dr. Bellows appears and ruins the scheme, scolding Tony and Roger for misusing the computer, snatching the readout with the date and walking off. Jeannie blinks herself into Tony's desk drawer, but with weakened powers she cannot blink out again.
41	11	"The Girl Who Never Had a Birthday: Part 2"	Claudio Guzman	Sidney Sheldon	November 21, 1966
Dr. Bellows's office is getting painted so he moves into Tony's office with Jeannie still trapped in the desk. Tony distracts Dr. Bellows by spinning personal tales that scream for psychoanalysis while Roger gives it another go with ERIC. Roger gets a new readout with the birthday and initiates an unwanted guessing game with Tony and Jeannie, but he's sent on an Alaskan survival mission before he can reveal the date. Roger phones repeatedly from Alaska and perpetuates the guessing game, infuriating Jeannie. Tony throws Jeannie a pre-birthday party where she blinks in famous figures from history.
42	12	"How Do You Beat Superman?"	Claudio Guzman	Sidney Sheldon	November 28, 1966
Tony is paying too much attention to football and, in Jeannie's opinion, not enough to her so, to get Tony jealous, she conjures up handsome, romantic attentive "Tony Millionaire" (Mike Road), claiming to have met him at the supermarket. Tony disapproves immediately but hides his jealousy until one evening when he witnesses Jeannie conjuring up the romantic phony. When Jeannie confesses her ruse, Tony pretends to have known Tony Millionaire was a fake all along. Roger continues to call from Alaska but fails to convey Jeannie's birthday each time.
43	13	"My Master, the Great Caruso"	Hal Cooper	Sidney Sheldon	December 5, 1966
Jeannie insists that Tony perform on the televised annual Air Force talent show, despite his lack of talent. As they chat on Tony's patio, she blinks him the voice of opera star Enrico Caruso—just in time for an approaching Dr. Bellows to overhear him singing a few notes. Dr. Bellows tells General Peterson of Tony's amazing voice, and enters him in the talent contest. Unfortunately, Tony has forced Jeannie to promise never to give him Caruso's voice again (though the promise has a loophole). During the show Tony belts out songs with a series of impressive though comically unsuitable voices. Roger finally reveals Jeannie's birthday after stalling with games one more time.
44	14	"The World's Greatest Lover"	Hal Cooper	Sidney Sheldon	December 12, 1966
When Roger cancels a double-date with Tony and Jeannie, Jeannie correctly surmises that Roger is unable to get a date himself. Feeling sorry for Roger, Jeannie makes him irresistible to all women. Mrs. Bellows (Emmaline Henry), who meets Roger for the first time, is also smitten and when Dr. Bellows notices her infatuation he re-assigns Roger to the Aleutian Islands to get rid of him. Roger's troubles are compounded when a mobster's fiancée, who now fancies Roger, demands Roger marry her the following Sunday.
45	15	"Jeannie Breaks the Bank"	Hal Cooper	Sidney Sheldon	December 19, 1966
Tony can't go in with Roger on a sailboat purchase because Jeannie's extravagant meals have made him broke. Tony and Jeannie head for the bank to get a loan, but once there, Jeannie realizes they won't qualify unless she intervenes. She monkeys with his account documents to make it appear Tony has $3,000,000 in his Christmas fund. While waiting in line at the bank, Dr. Bellows overhears the loan officer discussing Tony's huge fund. Guest Star: John McGiver as Wilfred, the bank lender.
46	16	"My Master, the Author"	Richard Goode	Sidney Sheldon	December 26, 1966
After witnessing a mother scolding her child, Jeannie wants to write a book about child rearing, which Tony encourages. After completing it, Jeannie sends her manuscript off to a publisher—but with Tony's name as author. The book is instantly popular but Dr. Bellows is mystified at Tony's being the author and puts him over a barrel by forcing him either to back up his claims in the book or confess that he's a fraud at a press conference. To make good on the claims, Tony has to convert Dr. Bellows's obnoxious and unruly nephew (Butch Patrick) into "a bundle of love" in a single evening. And, wouldn't you know it, General Peterson shows up on the same evening with another problem child (Kimberly Beck) but Jeannie comes up with a plan. Note: While the series never did a single holiday show, a short tag followed this episode: Jeannie and Tony wished everyone a happy holiday and a happier New Year, after which Jeannie blinked to make it snow. This brief scene has not been seen since the original broadcast and is largely considered lost.
47	17	"The Greatest Invention in the World "	Hal Cooper	Sidney Sheldon	January 9, 1967
After Roger inadvertently uses up his free wish from Jeannie to remove a spill on Tony's uniform, it becomes impervious to stains or damage. Dr. Bellows witnesses the miraculous properties but Tony tells him they've applied a secret new substance, “The X Factor,” to the jacket. Dr. Bellows tries to demonstrate the substance on General Peterson, but destroys the General's uniforms one by one. General Peterson gets fed up and reassigns Dr. Bellows to Iceland. Guest star: Groucho Marx as himself
48	18	"My Master, the Spy"	Hal Cooper	Sidney Sheldon	January 16, 1967
Jeannie blinks Tony and herself to Paris for lunch. But thanks to Jeannie, a duplicate Tony is attending a required NASA meeting with Dr. Bellows. During the meeting, Dr. Bellows receives a phone call from a French general telling him that Tony is at that moment sitting at a French café. Dr. Bellows suspects an imposter and plants a microphone in Tony's office. But Roger and Tony find the bug and conclude spies had planted it. Aware that their conversation is being transmitted, Tony fakes a plan for a rendezvous to "pass on the information" to a fictional contact. Having listened in on Tony's conversation, Gen. Peterson and Dr. Bellows show up at the rendezvous where Dr. Bellows accuses Tony of being a spy double.
49	19	"You Can't Arrest Me... I Don't Have a Driver's License"	Hal Cooper	Sidney Sheldon	January 23, 1967
After Tony breaks his promise to take Jeannie for a ride, she takes his car out herself and quickly goofs by driving the wrong way down a one-way street. She's stopped by Patrolman Don Anderson (Alan Hewitt) and given a ticket and Tony's car is impounded. After getting his car back, Tony offers to teach Jeannie to drive, but she makes the same mistake. Patrolman Anderson is there again, but Jeannie blinks herself away and Tony gets the ticket this time. When Tony pays the patrolman a home visit, he clandestinely films Tony and accuses him of attempted bribery. Roger and Tony go to court to fight the charges and Jeannie lends a hand by altering the film. Herb Vigran appears as Judge Hennessey.
50	20	"One of Our Bottles is Missing"	Claudio Guzman	Sidney Sheldon	January 30, 1967
After seeing Jeannie's bottle, Mrs. Bellows insists she be allowed to borrow it in order to have a copy made. Tony reluctantly agrees, but when he picks it up at the artisan shop doing the work, the shop workers mix up the original and the copy; Tony is given the copy while Mrs. Bellows gets the original—with Jeannie inside. While the Bellowses are out for the evening, Tony and Roger break into their house to get it back. Unfortunately for them, Dr. and Mrs. Bellows return early, catching them in the act. Note: The Bellowses' house is the same set used for the house exterior/interior on Bewitched. The DVD/Blu-ray releases and syndication prints feature a reconstructed soundtrack with new laugh track and recreated musical score.
51	21	"My Poor Master, the Civilian"	Hal Cooper	Sidney Sheldon	February 6, 1967
Washington pressures Tony to accept a job in the private sector. Convinced that Tony will be unhappy away from NASA, Roger and Jeannie look into his future using a magic nickelodeon machine but see only success and material luxury. So they trick him by showing him an alternate, miserable future. But the ever-dutiful Tony says he intends to leave the space program regardless, vowing to go wherever they need him most. In response, Roger and Jeannie cook up another scheme to allow him to stay in NASA. Note: The office set seen in the future is the Bewitched set of Darrin's office at McMann and Tate. Jeannie is also seen wearing a green genie costume in one scene; that costume is later used when Barbara Eden plays Jeannie's sister. The DVD/Blu-ray releases and syndication prints feature a reconstructed soundtrack with new laugh track and recreated musical score.
52	22	"There Goes the Best Genie I Ever Had"	Hal Cooper	Sidney Sheldon	February 20, 1967
Suspicious of Jeannie's excessive niceness, Tony discovers it is "Haji's Day," on which a master can wish away his genie for good if he is displeased with her. Though it pains him to do so, Tony opts for the wish. Later, his remorse gets the better of him just minutes after the deadline has passed but Jeannie has anticipated his change of heart. Note: This episode is part clip show.
53	23	"The Greatest Entertainer in the World"	Claudio Guzman	Sidney Sheldon	February 27, 1967
On hearing that someone is needed to head an entertainment committee for General Peterson's 10th anniversary at NASA, Jeannie twists Roger's arm to have Tony put in charge. Unfortunately Tony doesn't know any entertainers. Tony tries to get Sammy Davis Jr. for the show, but he's already booked on the anniversary date. Meanwhile, Roger blabs to Dr. Bellows that Tony plans to get Sammy, and now the pressure is really on to sign him because he's the General's favorite entertainer. Jeannie bails Tony out by creating a duplicate of Sammy.
54	24	"My Incredible Shrinking Master"	Claudio Guzman	Sidney Sheldon	March 6, 1967
Jeannie has a nightmare that something terrible is going to happen to Tony, and worse, she claims her dreams always come true. Still fearful, Jeannie tries to help Tony miniaturize some parts for a project but, without realizing, accidentally miniaturizes him too. While she spends the day shopping, six-inch high Tony is terrorized by a house cat and her recent dream comes into focus. Milton Frome appears as a produce clerk.
55	25	"My Master, the Pirate"	Claudio Guzman	Sidney Sheldon	March 13, 1967
Jeannie awakens to discover Tony preparing to go skin diving in search of sunken treasure; he explains the treasures are a result of the exploits of Captain Kidd, just off the Florida coast. Before he can object, Jeannie sends them both back in time to Captain Kidd's ship. There, they find that a British aristocrat, Lady Diane Nelson (Elaine Devry), is a prisoner on the ship. Tony realizes she's his distant ancestor and, reasoning that he'll never be born if she's killed, resolves to save her life. With Jeannie's help, the three of them manage to get ashore with the pirates in close pursuit.
56	26	"A Secretary is Not a Toy"	Claudio Guzman	Sidney Sheldon	March 20, 1967
Jeannie wants Tony promoted to general and believes she can make that happen if she becomes General Peterson's secretary. Dr. Bellows believes he recognizes her so takes her to lunch to get her to reveal her identity. Jeannie blunders when describing herself and now Dr. Bellows suspects she's a spy. He calls the C.I.A. to have them investigate and soon a C.I.A man (Bing Russell) arrives and explains there is no record of Jeannie whatsoever. Tony gets Jeannie to give up on the general scheme by getting her to believe that he intends to marry a girl Roger has selected, lying that generals must be married. She disappears from the base before Dr. Bellows can confront her.
57	27	"There Goes the Bride"	Larry Hagman	Sidney Sheldon	March 27, 1967
Jeannie is again determined to marry Tony and Tony is again determined to remain single. After Roger's advice fails, she resolves to put a love spell on Tony despite a stern warning by the Haji (Abraham Sofaer), master of all genies, that it's forbidden by decree. Once under the spell, Tony is eager to marry Jeannie and flies himself, Roger and Jeannie to Las Vegas for the wedding. But he suffers a series of ailments that Jeannie can neither explain nor cure with her powers. It dawns on her that the ailments are manifestations of the former warning, and she lifts the love spell so she can cure Tony.
58	28	"My Master, Napoleon's Buddy"	Claudio Guzman	Sidney Sheldon	April 3, 1967
After Tony tells Jeannie he's about to give a lecture on Napoleon's military strategy, she blinks them both back to meet him at his court. Napoleon becomes intrigued with Tony as he describes a list of Napoleon's true historical actions that, at that point, he had yet to undertake. Unfortunately Napoleon and his advisors also take Tony to be a spy and throw him in jail to await execution. Before they return, Tony has Jeannie try to convince Napoleon not to invade Russia. Danielle De Metz appears as Josephine.
59	29	"The Birds and Bees Bit"	Larry Hagman	Allan Devon (Note: This name was a pen name used by Sidney Sheldon)	April 10, 1967
Tony learns that genies lose their powers when they marry mortals and concludes he can solve his problems with Jeannie by marrying her. Roger questions the wisdom of the marriage so Jeannie summons Haji (Abraham Sofaer) to have him show them Tony's and Jeannie's married future. They discover that one of their children will be a genie, which Haji commands Jeannie to tell Tony before the wedding. When she doesn't, Roger threatens to but Jeannie blinks him to a dungeon.
60	30	"My Master, the Swinging Bachelor"	Hal Cooper	Sidney Sheldon	April 17, 1967
Mrs. Bellows discovers Tony's been gaining weight and suspects that his bachelor life has a secret, so invites herself and Dr. Bellows to Tony's for dinner without notice. Tony, thinking he can handle Mrs. Bellows, invites Roger and his date as well, but also tries to trick Jeannie to get her out of the house for the evening. He has a former girlfriend, Kathryn Golato (Bridget Hanley), over to cook for the dinner party, but Jeannie discovers the truth and tampers with the meal so that it tastes bad. To give Tony an explanation for his weight, she blinks up a cake, but eating it makes all the guests behave like children. The cake ingredients get analyzed by a lab, requiring Tony to come up with yet more explanations.
61	31	"The Mod Party"	Claudio Guzman	Douglas M. Dick (story); Peggy Chantler Dick (story and teleplay)	April 24, 1967
Roger invites Tony and Jeannie to a “mod party” forgetting he and Tony are required to be at an important meeting Dr. Bellows had planned. They make up a story for Dr Bellows about needing to go hunting, since he'd recently suggested they need outdoor activity. Meanwhile, Jeannie is shopping for a “mod outfit” where Mrs. Bellows overhears her plans to attend the party that night. Mrs. Bellows drags Dr. Bellows to the party to expose their lie but Jeannie blinks Tony and Roger into hunting outfits just in time—ancient Roman hunting outfits. Dr. Bellows thinks he's helping when he drops them at a camp site, where rain soon ruins their unplanned outing. Guest Star: Dabney Coleman as Captain Dan Yardley

=== Season 3 (1967–68) ===
No. overall	No. in season	Title	Directed by	Written by	Original release date
62	1	"Fly Me to the Moon"	Hal Cooper	Robert Marcus	September 12, 1967
Tony and Roger are training Sam the chimpanzee to go on an orbital mission. Jeannie hears Tony say he thinks the flight should have a human pilot so she turns Sam into a man (Larry Storch), and heads off to a beauty salon. After Tony and Roger realize an unfamiliar worker helping them is in fact Sam, Tony has Jeannie (on the phone, still at the salon) change him back, but she accidentally turns Tony into a chimp instead without realizing. When she returns Roger helps her correct her blunder. Guest Stars: Judy Pace as a receptionist at the Beauty Salon. Parley Baer as General Whiston. Howard Morton as Mr. Sidney, a Beautician.
63	2	"Jeannie or the Tiger?"	Hal Cooper	James Henerson	September 19, 1967
Jeannie hasn't seen her sister (also named "Jeannie") for over 200 years, so invites her for a visit. In contrast to Jeannie's good-natured naïveté, Jeannie #2 is worldly, conniving and underhanded. When she notices Tony's picture, she resolves to trap Jeannie in her bottle and take her place with Tony, and seeks to turn him into a world-traveling, international playboy. Tony discovers the imposter and liberates Jeannie from her bottle. The sisters fight for Tony using their magic and while Jeannie II torments him, Jeannie conjures up Jeannie II's Master to reclaim her.
64	3	"The Second Greatest Con Artist in the World"	Claudio Guzmán	Allan Devon	September 26, 1967
While Jeannie and Tony are in Hawaii, Jeannie inadvertently draws attention to herself by wearing an unusual scarab pin given her by Tutankhamun. Publicity of the pin attracts “Charles” (Milton Berle), a con artist, who poses as the wealthy man of whom he's actually the servant, a Mr. Vanderhaven (Fred Clark). Phony Vanderhaven cheats Jeannie out of her fabulous pin by offering her a worthless stretch of beach that he convinces her is littered with diamonds. After Tony informs Jeannie that she's been conned, she cons Charles back. Note: Alternate director Hal Cooper appears as "Eddie".
65	4	"My Turned-On Master"	Hal Cooper	Dennis Whitcomb	October 3, 1967
Jeannie begs Tony to allow her to accompany him to a press banquet, but he forbids it, fearing she'll blink up some trouble or other. To ease his worries, she promises to transfer her powers to someone else for 24 hours so that she'll be unable to do magic at the banquet. While at work, Tony's offhand remarks are manifested literally (e.g., Roger is turned into a brick when Tony calls him a brick) before Jeannie can explain she's in fact transferred her powers to him. As Tony becomes full of himself imagining the possibilities of his new powers, they discover he's already accidentally transferred them to Dr. Bellows. Guest Star: Pedro Gonzalez Gonzalez as Pedro
66	5	"My Master, the Weakling"	Claudio Guzman	Ron Friedman	October 10, 1967
Roger and Tony must participate in an experimental fitness program directed by ruthless exercise fanatic Commander Kiski (Don Rickles), who thinks they're "softies" and need to learn survival techniques. Kiski works them to exhaustion on the first day, but sees them out dancing with Jeannie later, after she insists that they keep their promise to take her out that evening. Now, Kiski is determined to be still tougher on them, but Jeannie intervenes and gives him the temperament of his sweet old aunt. Jeannie works more magic when the three of them get into trouble in a survival exercise. Harry Harvey Sr. appears as Gen. Powlett. Guest Stars: David Soul as an Orderly
67	6	"Jeannie, the Hip Hippie"	Hal Cooper	Christopher Golato	October 17, 1967
Mrs. Bellows forces Dr. Bellows to cancel his vacation, who in turn makes Tony cancel his, all because Mrs. Bellows needs help finding a band to play at her charity bazaar. Jeannie picks four random hipsters (Tommy Boyce and Bobby Hart along with William Lewis and Steve O'Reilly) and blinks them musical skills so they can play at the bazaar and get Tony off the hook. But Jeannie takes an interest in her new creation and gets them in front of Phil Spector. Tony's vacation takes a left turn when the band plans a tour. Note: Phil Spector guest stars as himself, though the credits refer to the character as "Steve Davis." Boyce and Hart also perform "Out and About", which reached number 39 on the Billboard Hot 100 in 1967.
68	7	"Everybody's a Movie Star"	Claudio Guzman	Mark Rowane	October 31, 1967
NASA brings in Allen Kerr (Paul Lynde) to direct a documentary about NASA and Dr. Bellows wants Tony and Roger to be in it. While Tony performs well, Roger bumbles his part and is generally the lousiest actor Kerr has ever seen. On the other hand, Kerr tells Dr. Bellows Tony could be the biggest star in Hollywood. As he lists Tony's star qualities, Roger overhears and believes the discussion is about himself, and the compliments immediately go to his head. When Roger is told he has no talent, he pretends he wasn't serious about acting, until Kerr tells him he thinks he's a comic genius.
69	8	"Who Are You Calling a Jeannie?"	Hal Cooper	Marty Roth	November 7, 1967
Jeannie pops in on Tony while he gives a NASA tour but before she can blink out, she's accidentally struck on the head and gets amnesia. A shyster lawyer (Richard Deacon) hangs around Jeannie and pressures her to file a lawsuit. At the hospital, Tony and Roger sneak into her room to help her recover her identity, but as they encourage her to try her magic, she accidentally turns Dr. Bellows into a mouse. He escapes from the room and is quickly mistaken for a mouse that's scheduled to be launched in a rocket for Mars. A second bump on the head gives Jeannie her memory back, but not in time to keep Dr. Bellows the mouse from being launched into space.
70	9	"Meet My Master's Mother"	Claudio Guzman	Marlene Fanta Shyer	November 14, 1967
Tony's meddling mother (Spring Byington) comes to visit and declares her intention to stay. She immediately critiques the housekeeping and Tony's weight, which Jeannie hears while hiding—and resents. Still unaware of Jeannie, the oblivious Mrs. Nelson is undeterred by Jeannie's attempts to antagonize her with tricks. Still worse, Mrs. Nelson sets herself the task of marrying off Tony. Jeannie hears Mrs. Nelson's list of the desired traits for Tony's ideal mate and presents herself with all of them. Mrs. Nelson heads home with the knowledge that Tony is hooked up with the right woman.
71	10	"Here Comes Bootsie Nightingale"	Hal Cooper	Paul West	November 21, 1967
The agent of movie star Bootsie Nightingale (Carol Wayne) insists Dr. Bellows order Tony to escort Bootsie to Mrs. Bellows's benefit ball. Jeannie wants to go too, but Tony lies, saying he expects a boring affair, and that Bootsie is an old woman. Thanks to Roger, Jeannie finds out Bootsie is young and beautiful. Angry over the deception, Jeannie gives Tony a squeaky munchkin-like voice when he picks Bootsie up for the evening. Bootsie is repulsed but Roger quickly steps in. At the ball, Roger's clumsy bumbling turns Bootsie off, but with Tony's voice back to normal, Bootsie sets her sights on him. As she tries to announce that she's getting engaged to Tony (without his agreeing), Jeannie sends her into a frenzy with a few mischievous blinks.
72	11	"Tony's Wife"	Claudio Guzman	Christopher Golato	November 28, 1967
In order to have Tony for herself, Jeannie II tells Jeannie that she was born under the sign of the jinx and that she must leave Tony for 15 years. Jeannie tries to find Tony a wife to take care of him and introduces him to Helen Wheeler (Shannon Farnon). Tony continues to see Helen despite Jeannie II's pranks. Tony and Jeannie make a plan to capture Jeannie II once they realize they've been tricked.
73	12	"Jeannie and the Great Bank Robbery"	Larry Hagman	Story by : Seaman Jacobs & Fred Fox; Teleplay by : Seaman Jacobs & Fred Fox & James Henerson	December 5, 1967
Tony tries to get Jeannie out of his hair while he finishes an important report by having her go find someone else to help. Naïve Jeannie promptly gets tricked by two shady characters into helping them in a bank heist, and she uses Tony's car in the process. Afterwards, Tony must explain his car's involvement after the police trace it to him. Angry at the turn of events, Tony orders Jeannie to straighten things out, and with her help they capture the crooks. Severn Darden appears as Milton, one of the crooks. Guest Star: Mike Mazurki as Girard, one of the crooks.
74	13	"My Son, the Genie"	Claudio Guzman	Bill Richmond	December 12, 1967
In addition to his usual stresses resulting from having a genie, Tony must also endure the service of a second, Harold (Bob Denver), by order of Harold's father, Haji. It doesn't help that Harold is merely an apprentice genie; Tony has no choice but to accept his service, but his magical attempts are uniformly disastrous. Tony's troubles are compounded by the fact that President Johnson is scheduled to visit Tony's house on the same day. Whether tossing a salad or cleaning the house, Harold can't get anything right.
75	14	"Jeannie Goes to Honolulu"	Claudio Guzman	Mark Rowane	December 19, 1967
Tony lies to Jeannie that he's about to go to the North Pole for survival training when he's actually headed for Hawaii. Jeannie soon finds out and blinks herself to the beach where Tony is lounging. She gets angry when she sees him swarmed by bikini-clad girls, but Tony comes up with a new lie in which he's protecting a Princess Maja (Brenda Benet) from some devious character. Roger lets it slip to Jeannie that "The Princess" Tony is escorting around is in fact an Admiral's daughter. Jeannie makes trouble for Tony with some well-placed tricks. Guest Star: Don Ho as himself
76	15	"The Battle of Waikiki"	Hal Cooper	Marty Roth	January 2, 1968
Still in Hawaii, Tony says he wishes he could talk to King Kamehameha (Michael Ansara) so Jeannie blinks Kamehameha into the present. Disappointed after seeing and hearing the din of modern Honolulu, which Tony describes as "progress," Kamehameha resolves to raise an army and retake Hawaii. A handful of Hawaiians answer his call but are easily distracted by the delights of a local luau, and Kamehameha throws in the towel.
77	16	"Genie, Genie, Who's Got the Genie?: Part 1"	Claudio Guzman	James Henerson	January 16, 1968
Chatting with Tony at NASA, Jeannie blinks herself into an open safe to hide when they hear approaching footsteps. The safe door is accidentally shut with Jeannie inside, but no one has the combination and the safe is rigged to explode if the wrong combination is tried. To make matters worse, the safe is to be loaded on a rocket for the moon. Tony and Roger hire a safecracker (Edward Andrews) but they're interrupted before they can open the safe. Watching from a T.V. monitor, Tony sees a safe on its way to the rocket and tries to chase it down but doesn't make it before the rocket is launched. Jack Smith appears as Congressman Widdicomb.
78	17	"Genie, Genie, Who's Got the Genie?: Part 2"	Claudio Guzman	James Henerson	January 23, 1968
Tony is ecstatic when Roger tells him he had switched boxes and the safe is still in the area. In the meantime, the safecracker and his helper steal the safe but then sell the problematic thing to a pawnbroker (Reta Shaw), who in turn sends it to a junkyard to be scrapped. Tony finds the wrecking yard but is told the safe has already gone through "the crusher" and believes all is lost. Roger discovers the safe is in fact unharmed and after getting it back, Tony and Roger try to get the safe's creator (Ned Wertimer) to open it. Blocked at every turn, they now find that only the President of the United States has the combination. Susan Howard appears as Miss Temple the Switchboard Operator.
79	18	"Genie, Genie, Who's Got the Genie?: Part 3"	Hal Cooper	James Henerson	January 30, 1968
Jeannie II shows up and when she finds out Jeannie is locked in the safe, she switches assignments between Tony and another officer (Mike Farrell), which sends Tony to the Middle East—Jeannie II's home turf. While in Baghdad Tony searches for Haji, the chief of the genies, but Jeannie II captures him and imprisons him in a birdcage. Roger tries to rescue Tony but suffers the same fate. Jeannie II is found out by her own master, Habib (Ted Cassidy), who orders her to let them go.
80	19	"Genie, Genie, Who's Got the Genie?: Part 4"	Hal Cooper	James Henerson	February 6, 1968
Jeannie tells Tony that whoever opens the safe will become her master. So, with demolition expert Dr. Wedemeyer (Benny Rubin) on his way to NASA to open the safe, Tony disguises it as an ice cream cart in order to get it home and open it first. With time running out, Tony defuses the bomb at Wedemeyer's direction but tricks him into leaving just before he finishes the last combination digit. Guest Star: Ron Masak as Joe the ice cream man.
81	20	"Please, Don't Feed the Astronauts"	Hal Cooper	Ron Friedman	February 13, 1968
Paul Lynde makes another appearance, this time as nutrition expert Commander Porter, who tests Tony and Roger to exhaustion in a hospital lab. To help out, Jeannie blinks both Tony and Roger into a super energetic state. Porter concludes that their energy is coming from his own special vitamin pills, and that they're ready for the real test: five days and nights on Skull Island living off the land without supplies. Porter accompanies them and joins the survival test. Jeannie creates conspicuous sources of food but covers it up by getting Porter to conclude that his nutrition-deprived state is causing him hallucinations.
82	21	"My Master, the Ghostbreaker"	Hal Cooper	Christopher Golato	February 20, 1968
Unscrupulous estate agent James Ashley (Jack Carter) shows up and informs Tony he's inherited an English castle. Tony, Roger and Jeannie visit the castle, but Ashley is working to convince them the place is haunted. Tony soon discovers that Ashley has already tried to sell the castle to Sir Widgin Willingham (Ronald Long) and reckons Ashley is behind the fake haunting. The next night in the house, Tony exposes Ashley, but Ashley and Willingham flee when a "real" ghost appears. Tony assumes Jeannie is pulling a trick, but when she denies it, Roger, Tony and Jeannie beat a hasty retreat too. Leslie Randall appears as Chauncy Smedley, the butler.
83	22	"Divorce, Genie Style"	Hal Cooper	James Henerson	February 27, 1968
Jeannie feels inadequate when Tony extols the domestic skills of Mrs. Bellows. To prove she's equally capable, Jeannie asks Haji to remove her genie powers, to which he agrees—but for one week only. Unable to blink away when Mrs. Bellows shows up unannounced, Jeannie tries to explain her presence, but Mrs. Bellows forms the impression that Jeannie and Tony are secretly married and is appalled that she dresses in a harem costume and calls Tony "master." Mrs. Bellows concludes that Tony is a tyrannical husband, and that Jeannie needs a divorce. When Jeannie tries to explain to Mrs. Bellows and a lawyer that she actually is a genie, they think she's a fruitcake. Woodrow Parfrey appears as Mr. Murdock, Jeannie's divorce lawyer.
84	23	"My Double-Crossing Master"	Hal Cooper	Mark Rowane	March 5, 1968
Tony makes a bet with Roger that Jeannie would never be interested in any man but him. To prove it, Tony disguises himself as a British officer, and expresses interest in Jeannie. Jeannie sees through Tony's disguise and plays along, accepting his advances. Tony grows more and more jealous as his ploy continues to flop.
85	24	"Have You Ever Had a Jeannie Hate You?"	Claudio Guzman	Allan Devon	March 12, 1968
Jeannie II shows up with a pair of potions, one that makes a person irresistibly lovable and the other detestable, and offers them to Jeannie for her use. But she secretly switches them and Jeannie sprinkles Tony with the wrong one, causing her to hate him with murderous intensity. Roger gets sprinkled with the other one. Jeannie II later brags to Tony about what she's done. Tony grabs the potions, finds Roger and Jeannie, and tricks Jeannie into sprinkling the love potion on him. A final trick on Jeannie II fools her into leaving.
86	25	"Operation: First Couple on the Moon"	Claudio Guzman	Arthur Julian	March 19, 1968
Jeannie II is back and this time gets Jeannie worried that Tony will be paired with a beautiful woman in project "First Couple on the Moon." As usual, her only interest is in hooking up with Tony and to "help," she poses as Dr. Rita Walters and competes against the beautiful Professor Henrietta Swanson (Kay Reynolds) for the position as Tony's partner. Jeannie II wins the spot using her powers. When Jeannie tells Tony Dr. Walters is really Jeannie II, they plot to get rid of her. In the end, Dr. Bellows scrubs the mission. Guest Star: William Smith as Turk Parker, Henrietta's fiancé.
87	26	"Haven't I Seen Me Someplace Before?"	Claudio Guzman	Marty Roth	March 26, 1968
Roger once again blows a free wish from Jeannie when he accidentally wishes aloud that he could swap places with Tony in order to go on a special mission Tony has been selected for. The wish results in their switching bodies, which Roger does not realize at first, though Tony and Jeannie do. Jeannie and Tony must try to find Roger since only he can undo the wish and the mission is almost upon them. Along the way they arouse the suspicions of Dr. and Mrs. Bellows and have to work hard to counter them. While in hospital, Dr. Bellows gets egg on his face when he tries to show Gen. Peterson how Roger and Tony have become schizophrenic.

=== Season 4 (1968–69) ===
No. overall	No. in season	Title	Directed by	Written by	Original release date
88	1	"U-F-Ohh Jeannie"	Hal Cooper	Marty Roth	September 16, 1968
As Tony and Roger are testing an experimental aircraft that looks like a flying saucer, Jeannie pops aboard to bring Tony lunch and pops out again, but her added weight causes the aircraft to land far off course. A family of hillbillies (J. Pat O'Malley and Kathleen Freeman) take them for Martians and hold them hostage at gun point. Tony plays on their greed by suggesting a reward awaits them if they're turned in to NASA. One of the hillbilly men takes a shine to Jeannie and she has to play defense against his unwanted aggressions while she tries to find the captive astronauts. Guest star: William Bassett as Clem
89	2	"Jeannie and the Wild Pipchicks"	Claudio Guzman	James Henerson	September 23, 1968
Jeannie's mother sends her a package of "pipchicks"—her favorite, homemade candies. Pipchicks have the unusual but temporary side effect of giving the consumer enormous strength. Dr. Bellows gets ahold of one, experiences the effect and insists Tony give the recipe to a NASA dietician (Reta Shaw). When Tony explains that he ad libs when he cooks, Dr. Bellows simply orders him to bake up a new batch. Jeannie gets her mother to give up the recipe for Tony but this recipe has a different side effect: removing a person's inhibitions. All involved eat some of the new batch, throw caution to the wind and let it all hang out.
90	3	"Tomorrow is Not Another Day"	Hal Cooper	Bruce Howard	October 7, 1968
Tony's morning newspaper doesn't get delivered so Roger suggests Jeannie blink one up, but when she asks for the date he gives her the wrong one. The paper she blinks up is for the next day instead, and features a headline saying an unnamed astronaut has broken his leg. Tony and Jeannie rush out to find Roger, worrying the headline might be referring to him. But Roger, who has taken the paper's sports section, is off to the horse races to place bets on the winners he alone has fore-knowledge of. Guest star: Rosey Grier as Sam, Roger's masseur
91	4	"Abdullah"	Claudio Guzman	Marty Roth	October 14, 1968
Jeannie agrees to babysit her baby nephew, Abdullah (who has infant magic powers), while her brother and his wife are taking a late honeymoon. She also agrees to fill in for them in the service of The Sultan of Hyderabad for a day, leaving Tony and Roger to take care of the ceaselessly crying infant genie. Tony has to scramble to hide all traces of Abdullah from Dr. Bellows. Jane Dulo appears as a nurse.
92	5	"Have You Heard the One About the Used Car Salesman?"	Hal Cooper	James Henerson	November 4, 1968
While Jeannie is trying to help Tony with his car's dead battery, she accidentally drives off and immediately crashes it. The car winds up in the hands of unscrupulous used car dealer Carl Tucker (Carl Ballantine) where Jeannie tries to have it repaired. Jeannie figures out Tucker is a cheat and blinks up trouble for him while he's filming a live TV commercial. Afterwards, Tony tries to convince a traffic cop that Jeannie is a computer when the cop pulls the car over with no driver and Jeannie alone in the back seat. Guest star: Bob Hastings as Homer Banks, Amanda Bellows's cousin, who makes unwanted advances to Jeannie. Henry Beckman appears as a policeman. Note: Bob Hastings, Carl Ballantine and Henry Beckman all starred in McHale's Navy (Beckman in fourth season only).
93	6	"Djinn-Djinn, Go Home"	Hal Cooper	James Henerson	November 11, 1968
During a visit to Tony's house, Amanda Bellows finds a friendly dog at his front door and wants to adopt it. But it's Jeannie's dog, Djinn-Djinn, who's come home to his mistress. Tony quickly learns that Djinn-Djinn has some inconvenient habits, like turning invisible at will and launching attacks on anyone wearing a uniform. Tony has to repeatedly invent ways to keep Mrs. Bellows from taking the magical mutt home with her—and ways to get him back when she succeeds. Djinn-Djinn wreaks havoc when Mrs. Bellows leaves him at the base—a haven of walking uniforms.
94	7	"The Strongest Man in the World"	Claudio Guzman	Ray Singer	November 18, 1968
Jeannie blinks Tony temporary super strength to help him dispense with some thugs who harass them at a movie theatre. A visiting Air Force general witnesses Tony's handiwork and insists Tony be the Air Force's contender in an armed forces boxing tournament. The general has a personal stake in an Air Force boxer beating the rival marine boxer, adding to the pressure on Tony to win. Before the fight, Jeannie gets trapped in a locker and is unable to help Tony until the final round. Guest Star: Richard X. Slattery as Gen. Hamilton, Jerry Quarry as himself, "Slapsie Maxie" Rosenbloom as himself, Pepper Martin appears as Killer Culligan.
95	8	"Indispensable Jeannie"	Claudio Guzman	James Henerson	November 25, 1968
Tony and Roger must spend a week together in Tony's house as a compatibility test for long space flights together. Tony sends Jeannie away, but she returns to put the house "on automatic" such that it magically responds to any expressed wish. Tony and Roger constantly irritate each other, and when Dr. Bellows hears they're not getting along he wants to split them up as a team. Jeannie causes Dr. Bellows and his wife to have a fight themselves so that he'll realize arguments are less important than a true bond. Guest star: Roger Garrett as Joe
96	9	"Jeannie and the Top Secret Secret"	Hal Cooper	Searle Kramer	December 2, 1968
Tony takes the day off to celebrate his third anniversary together with Jeannie, but Dr. Bellows calls to demand he come immediately to the base. There, Dr. Bellows orders him to fly to The Pentagon to deliver a top secret NASA film. Tony receives instructions to meet a Sgt. Marion (Joseph V. Perry), who will transfer the film to him. Jeannie eavesdrops on the conversation and concludes Tony is meeting a woman named "Marion," then alters the film out of spite. The Air Force brass are not amused with the comic reel Tony presents at the secret meeting. Sabrina Scharf appears as a woman Jeannie thinks Tony is meeting. Note: Vinton Hayworth plays General Watson, but would soon take the recurring role of General Schaeffer, succeeding General Peterson.
97	10	"How To Marry an Astronaut"	Hal Cooper	James Henerson	December 9, 1968
Jeannie II returns and, seeing that Jeannie has not yet tied the knot with Tony, offers to teach her how to marry the man she wants. She uses Roger to demonstrate her strategies on, eventually getting him to propose, but when Jeannie tries the same techniques on Tony they fall flat. Tony's attempts to warn Roger off having anything to do with Jeannie II fall on deaf ears. At the wedding altar Jeannie II swaps Tony for Roger but Jeannie foils her scheme and traps her in a champagne bottle.
98	11	"Dr. Bellows Goes Sane"	Richard Kinon	James Henerson	December 16, 1968
Dr. Bellows assembles a dossier on all the unexplained incidents involving Tony in order to document them and to show General Peterson. But the effort backfires when General Peterson takes the fanciful claims in the report as evidence that Dr. Bellows has gone around the bend. The General replaces Dr. Bellows with unorthodox psychiatrist Dr. Corbett (Joe Flynn), who intends to use truth serum and "hypnodiscs" on Tony to get him to reveal his secrets. Tony and Jeannie try to make Dr. Corbett believe he's losing his mind, but they can't quite get it right. Note: This episode is the last one recorded by Barton MacLane (playing Gen. Peterson), though three episodes aired after his death.
99	12	"Jeannie the Guru"	Claudio Guzman	James Henerson	December 30, 1968
Tony gives a ride to hippie hitchhiker Suzie (Hilarie Thompson), who happens to be the daughter of his new commanding officer, General Schaeffer (Vinton Hayworth). The General disapproves of that hippie nonsense, and in particular has it in for a character named “Harold” (Michael Margotta) who's been hanging around Suzie. Suzie invites herself into Tony's life (and house), along with Harold. Adding to Tony's troubles, Gen. Schaeffer charges him with chaperoning Suzie and keeping Harold at bay. But Suzie has witnessed Jeannie's blinking talents and blackmails Tony into breaking the news to her father that she plans to marry Harold. When the General shows up at Tony's house, Jeannie transforms Harold into a clean-cut, well dressed version of himself, and Suzie quickly loses interest. Note: This is the first appearance of General Schaeffer, and it aired 2 days before the death of Barton MacLane, who played General Peterson.
100	13	"The Case of My Vanishing Master, Part 1"	Hal Cooper	James Henerson	January 6, 1969
Suspecting a security leak, NASA sends Tony to a secret location to finish design work on a spacecraft before he has a chance to inform Jeannie and Roger. NASA replaces Tony with a look-alike double who knows nothing of Tony's personal life, and is surprised to find Jeannie at Tony's house, at first thinking she's a maid. Fake Tony finally concludes that Jeannie is Tony's girlfriend, but is bewildered by the inexplicable happenings she blinks up, though he never witnesses her working magic. Jeannie is over the moon when the double inadvertently gives her the impression that he—or Tony rather—wants to marry her. Benny Rubin appears as an Arabian Reverend.
101	14	"The Case of My Vanishing Master, Part 2"	Hal Cooper	James Henerson	January 13, 1969
Roger discovers Tony has been replaced by a double and races to Tony's house to prevent fake Tony from showing Dr. Bellows Jeannie's tricks. Roger convinces Jeannie that the double is not Tony before he gets a chance to reveal Jeannie's nature to Dr. Bellows, and out of anger she torments the double with mean tricks. Jeannie presses Roger to help her find Tony, but the situation is more urgent still, as fake Tony is in fact a double-agent working for a foreign power, sent to steal the project the real Tony is working on. The confusions multiply when Tony returns home and everyone takes him for fake Tony.
102	15	"Ride 'Em Astronaut"	Claudio Guzman	James Henerson	January 27, 1969
Jeannie is the millionth customer at a local market, which gets her crowned Queen of the Supermarket by the Store Manager (Richard Erdman). The Queen gets to be queen of Charles Akins's (John Myhers) Wild West Rodeo too, and dating the rodeo's top performer comes with the job. Tony and Roger dress up as cowboys so they can keep an eye on Jeannie at the rodeo, but accidentally sign up as rodeo competitors. Cowboy Tony has two left feet as a rodeo performer until Jeannie steps in. Mark Miller appears as Wild Bill Barrows, who wants a crack at Jeannie. Note: The ending is stock footage from the Season 3 episode, "Tony's Wife".
103	16	"Invisible House for Sale"	Hal Cooper	James Henerson	February 3, 1969
Tony spends his spare time working around the house and not with Jeannie, so, following Roger's suggestion, Jeannie puts the Nelson house up for sale so they can move into an apartment. When a snooty home buyer comes to see the house, Jeannie makes it appear regal and opulent, blinking mansion-scale rooms behind its humble doors. The buyer thinks it's a steal and puts down a deposit. Tony finds out what's afoot and has Jeannie put a stop to the deal, which she tries to do by making the house invisible. Guest stars: Harold Gould as Irwin Winkler. Joan Tompkins as Mrs. Natalie Winkler.
104	17	"Jeannie, the Governor's Wife"	Hal Cooper	Christopher Golato	February 10, 1969
Jeannie hears about an upcoming gubernatorial election and insists Tony run for the office, blinking up “Nelson for Governor” posters which Dr. Bellows immediately discovers in Tony's office. Oblivious to the ramifications, Roger enthusiastically encourages the endeavor but Tony has no interest in leaving the space program. Jeannie and Roger persist and Jeannie finally blinks up a noisy campaign party in Tony's office. But she puts an end to it all when her magic future-revealing nickelodeon machine shows Tony marrying another woman. Dr. Bellows looks crazy when he bursts in with Gen. Peterson to show him the party in Tony's office, which Jeannie has just blinked out of existence. Note: This is the 1st of 3 posthumous appearances of Barton MacLane as General Peterson.
105	18	"Is There a Doctor in the House?"	Oscar Rudolph	Christopher Golato	February 17, 1969
Tony instantly falls into a deep sleep whenever he hears whistles or sirens. Jeannie concludes correctly that her mother is behind it and demands she fix the condition; Jeannie's mother consents, but explains she must do it in person. While trying to cure Tony she accidentally gives Dr. Bellows the same condition, then falls for him as he lies unconscious. Gen. Peterson and Dr. Bellows both think they're cracking up. Note: This is the 2nd of 3 posthumous appearances of Barton MacLane as General Peterson.
106	19	"The Biggest Star in Hollywood"	Claudio Guzman	James Henerson	February 24, 1969
Tony and Dr. Bellows are preparing for a trip to Hollywood but Tony forbids Jeannie to go. While shopping for the trip at a clothing store with Tony, Jeannie is spotted by Gary Owens and George Schlatter of Rowan & Martin's Laugh-In. They see what they think is Jeannie pulling off a magic trick as she appears inside a mirror, and propose to sign her for the TV show. Smelling an opportunity to exploit the situation, Roger claims to be her agent and convinces her to come to Hollywood under the name "Princess Armena." Nosy Hollywood reporters complicate matters for Tony as he tries to keep "Princess Armena" under wraps and away from Dr. Bellows. Guest stars: Sid Melton as photographer Doug Reynolds; Gary Owens, George Schlatter, Arte Johnson and Judy Carne as themselves.
107	20	"The Case of the Porcelain Puppy"	Claudio Guzman	James Henerson	March 3, 1969
Jeannie practices a new spell that changes objects into porcelain, including Tony's hat and briefcase, which Tony must explain to Dr. Bellows after he watches both shatter. Tony tells him he's taken up pottery as a hobby, and when Amanda Bellows insists on coming to see Tony's work, has Jeannie turn the garage into a work studio. While populating the studio with items, Jeannie accidentally turns her dog Djinn-Djinn into porcelain. Not knowing of porcelain Djinn-Djinn, Tony offers Mrs. Bellows anything that strikes her fancy, and she picks the dog. Mrs. Bellows calls in fine oriental porcelain expert Dr. Farber (Woodrow Parfrey), who judges the work to be a 15th century masterpiece. Jeannie brings porcelain Djinn-Djinn back to life at NASA whereupon he terrorizes everyone around. Note: Barton MacLane appears as General Peterson for the final time in this episode. (MacLane died of double pneumonia on New Year's Day, 1969.)
108	21	"Jeannie for the Defense"	Hal Cooper	Bruce Howard	March 10, 1969
Tony gets caught in a speed trap in a small town where he and Roger have gone for a fishing trip. They encounter more trouble when Tony's fender gently bumps another car in the same town. The car owners (Kay E. Kuter and Ann Morgan Guilbert), are insurance fraud scam artists, who fake injuries and sue Tony. At the trial, Roger does more harm than good, but Jeannie manages to expose the fraudsters. Guest Stars: Dick Sargent as Norman Cashman, Tony's lawyer. J. Pat O'Malley as Judge Elroy Miller. William Bassett as Sam Farrow, the prosecutor. William Bramley as the policeman.
109	22	"Nobody Loves a Fat Astronaut"	Claudio Guzman	Christopher Golato	March 17, 1969
Jeannie II is back and this time cons Jeannie into letting her convince Tony he shouldn't go on an upcoming Moon shot, pointing out the dangers. Rather than attempt any "convincing," Jeannie II uses her magic to make Tony appear to be cracking up in front of his superiors, hoping he'll be enraged at what he thinks are Jeannie's tricks and throw her out. Tony is indeed furious, but instead of throwing Jeannie out, asks her to undo the damage. They manage to fix things but Jeannie II has more tricks up her sleeve. Note: This is the first appearance of General Schaeffer after the death of Barton MacLane, who played General Peterson. General Schaeffer had previously appeared in episode 99.
110	23	"Around the Moon in 80 Blinks"	Claudio Guzman	James Henerson	March 24, 1969
Jeannie has a cold that she passes on to Tony just before his orbital flight around the Moon. When she sees Tony on TV communicating with NASA, his cold symptoms convince her to blink him home so she can care for him. But her cold affects her powers and she accidentally blinks down Commander Leslie Wingate (Richard Mulligan), who concludes he's hallucinating. Wingate takes a sleeping pill hoping to sleep off his "hallucination." Jeannie manages to blink Tony down next but refuses to blink them back to the capsule, fearing she might miss. So she blinks herself to the capsule to help Roger, leaving Tony to hide himself and the now groggy Wingate when Amanda and Dr. Bellows walk into Tony's to decorate it for a party. Tony has his hands full keeping Wingate under the impression he's still hallucinating and simultaneously keeping them both out of sight.
111	24	"Jeannie-Go-Round"	Claudio Guzman	James Henerson	April 7, 1969
Jeannie II once again hopes to get Tony to dump Jeannie by impersonating her without Tony's knowing. This time she gets Tony to think Jeannie's turned against him out of anger at his leaving her home on the night of a promised date. Jeannie II trails Tony to the Cocoa Beach Cabana where she appears as Jeannie and embarrasses Tony in front of the crowd and the Bellowses. Back at home, Tony angrily orders Jeannie to her bottle but can't understand what's happening as Jeannie II keeps appearing (as Jeannie) and playing more tricks on him. Eventually Jeannie gets out and puts Jeannie II in her place. Dave Barry appears as the night club comedian.
112	25	"Jeannie and the Secret Weapon"	Leo Garen	Larry Markes	April 14, 1969
Tony and Roger are working on plans for AGNES, a new flying space station. Jeannie believes AGNES won't fly and blinks up a scale model to prove it. Dr. Bellows sees the model but Tony claims it's a toy and hastily has Jeannie get rid of it. She gifts it to a boy she sees in a park, but also gives it the power to fly. Coincidentally, the boy's father is a toy inventor who's produced nothing but failures and now he wants to capitalize on the boy's find. Dr. Bellows tells AGNES's inventor, Marvin Oglethorpe (Richard Schaal), of the model but can't constrain him as Oglethorpe accuses Tony and Roger of having stolen the plans for the secret weapon and sold them to a toy manufacturer. Meanwhile the boy's father actually does sell the model to a toy manufacturer. Guest Stars: Ron Masak as MacWhorter, the inventor father.
113	26	"Blackmail Order Bride"	Claudio Guzman	James Henerson	May 12, 1969
After Tony refuses to give information on his private life at a press conference, unscrupulous reporter Charlie Farnum (George Furth) disguises himself as a plumber and gains access to the Nelson home by convincing the unsuspecting Jeannie he must do work on their pipes. Farnum imagines he will receive the Pulitzer Prize if he can get the scoop on Tony's private life and hides cameras and tape recorders about the house. Tony and Jeannie discover the ruse and ruin all evidence of Jeannie's existence. Farnum then stoops to blackmail by getting his wife (Barbara Bostock) and two sons to pose as the wife and children Tony had abandoned years previously. Jeannie briefly believes it, but after discovering the truth she and Tony turn the tables on Farnum.

=== Season 5 (1969–70) ===
No. overall	No. in season	Title	Directed by	Written by	Original release date
114	1	"Jeannie at the Piano"	Hal Cooper	James Henerson	September 16, 1969
Jeannie casts a spell on the clunky, saloon-quality piano in the Air Force base recreation room, making Tony appear to be a virtuoso when he sits at it to play (immediately after he's complained to Dr. Bellows that he can barely play Chopsticks). Amazed by Tony's talent, Gen. Schaeffer (Vinton Hayworth) books Tony on a nationwide concert tour. Roger appoints himself Tony's agent and undermines Tony's attempts to sabotage the tour. Without the magic instrument Tony can't play a thing so he must go to great lengths to ensure the humble spinet is with him at every concert stop.
115	2	"Djinn-Djinn, the Pied Piper"	Claudio Guzman	James Henerson	September 23, 1969
Jeannie's uniform-shredding genie-dog, Djinn-Djinn, returns and when Gen. Schaeffer, who is proud of his highly trained Great Dane, sees Tony with the magical mutt, he insists on getting the dogs together at a park to compare their training skills. Tony tries to get out of it but Djinn-Djinn has other ideas. A combination of Jeannie's magical misfires and Djinn-Djinn's tricks results in the two dogs' going missing and winding up at Animal Control. Tony goes to retrieve them but must once again face the chaos that surrounds the occasionally invisible but almost always destructive magic dog. Guest star: Dick Wilson as Dockweiler the dog catcher.
116	3	"Guess Who's Going to Be a Bride? Part 1"	Hal Cooper	James Henerson	September 30, 1969
Jeannie's Uncle Suleiman (Jackie Coogan) comes to visit. Tony at first mistakes him for Amir Yachmin (Frank De Vol), a foreign dignitary that Tony has been ordered to take on a tour of NASA. Unfortunately, the true Amir is from a country that is an enemy of uncle Suleiman, and when Suleiman catches sight of him, he tries several ways of doing away with the Amir. The Amir catches on to the attempts, but believes Tony is the one responsible. Meanwhile, Jeannie is unsuccessful in her attempts to get Tony to agree to marry her. Dejected, she takes up Suleiman's offer to become queen of his home country, and to marry a local suitor. But Tony's problems are just starting as the Amir accuses him of attempted murder, which forces the Air Force brass to relieve him of his duties.
117	4	"Guess Who's Going to Be a Bride? Part 2"	Hal Cooper	James Henerson	October 7, 1969
After Jeannie leaves Cocoa Beach, Tony realizes he can't live without her. He can't pursue her though because the incident with the Amir has forced Dr. Bellows to drop him from the astronaut program, and assign him duty in Alaska with Roger. Presently they're reinstated and are ordered to return to NASA, but Tony diverts his flight to Baghdad to seek after Jeannie, who now believes Tony does not care for her, and whom her uncle has decreed shall marry the first suitor who can answer a royal riddle. Unfortunately, he who answers the riddle incorrectly is rewarded with immediate execution, which Tony discovers the hard way. Jeannie manages to blink them out of the situation in the nick of time, and when they return to NASA, Tony announces they're engaged—which surprises even Jeannie.
118	5	"Jeannie's Beauty Cream"	Hal Cooper	Joanna Lee	October 14, 1969
Jeannie gives Amanda Bellows some of her beauty cream. But the cream has unnatural powers which cause Mrs. Bellows to appear as a much younger woman whom no one recognizes. Mrs Bellows cannot understand why everyone at NASA treats her as a stranger. Tony is on to the situation and tries to shield her from the unrecognizing world. The problem is to get her out of public and back to her house. Roger is dispatched to the Bellows home to destroy all the mirrors to prevent Mrs. Bellows from seeing her reflection. Tony and Roger have double the trouble when Dr. Bellows comes home and they must prevent him from catching sight of Mrs. Bellows too. Finally, Tony has Jeannie create a new cream that changes Mrs. Bellows back to normal. Guest Stars: Harold Gould as General Whetherby and Laraine Stephens as the changed Mrs. Bellows.
119	6	"Jeannie and the Bachelor Party"	Hal Cooper	Dick Bensfield, Perry Grant	October 21, 1969
Tony doesn't want a bachelor party but Roger and Dr. Bellows plan one anyway. Dr. Bellows's idea for the party includes poker, cigars and football films, while Roger wants dancing girls, booze and a girl popping out of a cake; but they agree the plan should be kept secret, and hatch a plan to invite the party attendees to a "secret meeting" on the base. Amanda Bellows becomes suspicious and convinces Jeannie to accompany her to NASA to expose the scheme, and to show her that "men are liars." When Mrs. Bellows arrives she gets a double dose of confusion and gaslighting as the officers go all in on the party cover-up.
120	7	"The Blood of a Jeannie"	Claudio Guzman	John L. Greene	October 28, 1969
Jeannie and Tony go to "Ormandy's" jewelry store to pick out her wedding ring before they go for their blood tests. When Jeannie tells Tony she has blood just like everybody else, "with red and green corpuscles" Tony realizes they must substitute someone else's blood for Jeannie's, so they recruit Roger. But Roger has just gotten a series of inoculations and now Dr. Bellows thinks Jeannie is a walking epidemic and insists on giving her a physical. Before the physical, Jeannie wants to settle a score from earlier in the day, and blinks Ormandy's into Tony's office to catch a pickpocket (Ned Glass) who had lifted Tony's wallet. With dilated eyes from her eye exam Jeannie cannot properly blink the jewelry store back to where it belongs. Ivor Francis plays Ormandy, the jewelry store owner.
121	8	"See You in C-U-B-A"	Hal Cooper	John McGreevey	November 4, 1969
Jeannie blinks Tony out of the cockpit of a fully automatic military plane, wanting him to focus on what to serve for their luncheon that afternoon. She returns him to his plane, but lands it in Cuba rather than its intended destination of Puerto Rico. There, Tony finds himself a prisoner of a Cuban soldier who now thinks himself a hero with a valuable prisoner. Roger gets Jeannie to blink Tony home but she leaves the plane in Cuba. She then blinks Tony back to Cuba but sends Roger along to help him escape a suspicious Mrs. Bellows. Later, when the luncheon starts, she blinks both of them back, along with the plane, that's now parked in the street outside the Nelson house. Guest stars: Pedro Gonzalez Gonzalez as Jose, Farrah Fawcett as Tina, Roger's girlfriend.
122	9	"The Mad Home Wrecker"	Hal Cooper	Howard Ostroff	November 11, 1969
The Bellowses hire modern artist Helasco (Michael Lipton) to redecorate Tony's house as a wedding present. To everyone's horror, Helasco turns the place into a gaudy, avant-garde nightmare. Tony's forbidden to enter the house during the remodel so poses as a house painter to get in, hates what he sees and goes about wrecking what he can before Helasco kicks him out. Despite hating the designs Jeannie feels sorry for Helasco and restores his work. But everyone else hates the work too, so Jeannie blinks up a more conventional design when nobody's looking and Helasco gets a turn at being horrified.
123	10	"Uncles a Go-Go"	Russ Mayberry	Ron Friedman	November 25, 1969
Two of Jeannie's English uncles—Azmire (Ronald Long) and Vasmir (Arthur Malet)—come visiting in order to vet Tony as their niece's prospective groom prior to the wedding. Jeannie is at her wit's end trying to appease them but they're seeking opposite qualities: one wants Tony bawdy, the other, gentlemanly. Both uncles go to NASA where Vasmir poses as Dr. Bellows to test Tony, and Azmire does likewise but as Gen. Schaeffer. After Tony passes their tests they get him out of hot water with the real Bellows and Schaeffer.
124	11	"The Wedding"	Claudio Guzman	James Henerson	December 2, 1969
Tony and Jeannie are finally about to marry, and with Roger as best man. But since genies cannot be captured on film, Tony and Jeannie must figure out how to keep all the wedding photographers at bay. Jeannie panics and almost calls off the wedding, and considers eloping instead. But she comes up with a solution: to use a robotic mannequin to pose as her and be photographed until the instant when the vows are recited. Jack Smith appears as Rev. Weems.
125	12	"My Sister, the Home Wrecker"	Claudio Guzman	James Henerson	December 9, 1969
Jeannie II reads about Jeannie's and Tony's wedding and redoubles her efforts to get Tony for herself. She finds out that Jeannie has been invited to a party welcoming Major Biff Jellico (Michael Ansara), who's returning to the space program after a long absence. Jeannie II disguises herself as Jeannie and passionately kisses Jellico in full view of the Bellowses in order to stir up trouble between the Nelsons. The next night Jellico arrives at the Nelsons' to fetch the woman he'd kissed for a date, but discovers Jeannie is Tony's wife. Now Jeannie must prove she didn't kiss Jellico at the Bellowses' party and stop her sister before she causes more damage. Guest star: Farrah Fawcett as Tina/Cindy (the character is called "Tina" in the show but listed as "Cindy" in the credits).
126	13	"Jeannie, the Matchmaker"	Claudio Guzman	Don Richman, Bill Daily	December 16, 1969
Tony and Jeannie play matchmaker for single Roger, neither knowing what the other is up to. Tony tries to match him with General Schaeffer's niece, Patricia (Janis Hansen), who's not the shy, demur girl the General thinks. For her part, Jeannie tries a computer dating service, where the woman who runs the service (Elaine Giftos) selects herself for the match. Both women show up at the bar where Roger's waiting, but he knows nothing of the set-up. Not knowing who Patricia is, Jeannie blinks up a Mickey Finn to knock Patricia out so Roger will be available for her own choice for him. But both women drink the concoction and Tony and Roger have their hands full with two unconscious women, the Bellowses and the General when the latter show up at the bar too. The wheels really come off when the whole crowd shows up later at the Nelsons'.
127	14	"Never Put a Genie on a Budget"	Oscar Rudolph	Sidney Sheldon	December 30, 1969
Jeannie gets arrested for attempting to charge merchandise without a charge account. Tony must pay for the stuff she's taken, which he cannot afford, and tries to rein in Jeannie's spending by putting her on a budget. Tony has also been ordered to entertain the visiting Russian cosmonaut Maj. Gregorian (Noam Pitlik) for dinner. But Jeannie goes overboard with frugality, and serves a minuscule meal, along with stale bread, then introduces a young couple (Larry Bishop and Maggie Thrett) she's taken in as boarders. Witnessing the apparent budget constraints of the Nelsons, Gregorian concludes American astronauts are paupers and the space program is on a shoestring. Unhappy about Gregorian's impressions, Dr. Bellows gives Tony another chance to impress the VIP visitor. Stafford Repp appears as Lt. Morgan.
128	15	"Please Don't Give My Genie No More Wine"	Jon Anderson	James Henerson	January 6, 1970
When Tony forgets to bring a gift to a dinner party at the Bellowses, Jeannie blinks up a bottle of 400-year old Persian wine. The Bellowses love the wine but become invisible upon drinking it, though somehow they can still see each other. Worse yet, a congressman is set to arrive after their dinner. Tony calls Roger to have him delay the congressman so he and Jeannie can sober up the Bellowses, hoping they'll become visible again before the congressman arrives. Roger irritates the congressman with his delay tactics and eventually runs out of ideas. Guest Star: Alan Oppenheimer as Congressman Farragut
129	16	"One of Our Hotels is Growing"	Jerry Bernstein	Robert Rodgers	January 13, 1970
Tony and Jeannie go on honeymoon, accompanied by the Bellowses and Roger, who want an ordinary holiday. Since there are no rooms available at their hotel of choice, which is 12 stories high, Jeannie blinks up a 13th floor. She is forced to blink it in and out to stop the Bellowses and the hotel staff (Marvin Kaplan and Ned Wertimer) from finding out what's happened. Meanwhile, Roger, Tony and Jeannie conspire to keep the Bellowses in their hotel room for the entire vacation.
130	17	"The Solid Gold Jeannie"	Jerry Bernstein	Joanna Lee	January 20, 1970
Tony, Commander Wingate (Robert Hogan) and Roger are confined to an isolation chamber for 21 days after a trip to the Moon. When Jeannie comes to visit she ignores the chamber boundaries and blinks herself inside to greet Tony. Jeannie must remain in the chamber now too since she may have been contaminated by contact with the crew, and must also play cat and mouse, hiding from Wingate, and eventually, the Bellowses and a decontamination crew. She blinks herself down to the size of a small gold statue that's in the chamber but Wingate suspects something is amiss. Shirley Bonne appears as Sally Wingate. Guest star: Bill McKinney as Crewman #1 Note: Astronauts were actually housed in a Mobile Quarantine Facility, which was placed aboard the recovery ship. Mobile Quarantine Facilities became unnecessary after Apollo 14.
131	18	"Mrs. Djinn-Djinn"	Russ Mayberry	Richard Bensfield, Perry Grant	February 3, 1970
Djinn-Djinn arrives for a visit but this time he brings his mate with him, who is pregnant. A misunderstanding causes Roger to think Jeannie, not Djinn-Djinn, is expecting, and he tells Tony. Tony rushes home only to find out that he's not the one about to become a father. Meanwhile, Roger blabs to the NASA staff that Jeannie is pregnant and soon Dr. Bellows and General Schaeffer are planning a surprise baby shower. When the guests show up, Jeannie, Tony and Roger not only must prepare to receive a litter of magic puppies, but must keep Djinn-Djinn away from the officers to avoid a host of shredded Air Force uniforms.
132	19	"Jeannie and the Curious Kid"	Claudio Guzman	Richard Bensfield, Perry Grant	February 10, 1970
While spending the day at the Nelsons' house, Mrs. Bellows's nephew Melvin (Michael Barbera) witnesses Jeannie coming out of her bottle. He then steals the bottle after seeing Jeannie return to it. After Tony discovers Jeannie's missing, Dr. Bellows phones him and tells him the bottle is in his possession and that Tony can collect it the following morning. Meanwhile, Melvin transfers Jeannie to another bottle. Tony and Roger break into the Bellowses' house to get the bottle and muddle through the requisite mishaps.
133	20	"Jeannie, the Recording Secretary"	Claudio Guzman	James Henerson	February 24, 1970
Jeanie is nominated as the recording secretary of the officers' wives' association, which is about to give their first annual "good husband" award. The other wives show up at the Nelsons' wanting to interview Tony for the award, but he's away on a mission. They conclude that he must not be a good husband since he is away in the evening when they arrive. Jeannie desperately wants Tony to get the award so she blinks him back. But Tony and Roger have just taken sleeping pills so Jeannie has to make Tony check all the "good husband" boxes despite being asleep. She has to blink him back and forth each time the wives want to interview him, but each time he's under the influence of the sleeping pills.
134	21	"Help, Help, a Shark"	Claudio Guzman	James Henerson	March 3, 1970
Tony is denied a vacation Jeannie has her heart set on after he involuntarily yelps (having spotted a tiny Jeannie in his coat pocket) just as Gen. Schaeffer is about to take a billiards shot. Schaeffer misses, ruining his first ever win against his old foe, Gen. Charles Fitzhugh (Jim Backus). Tony manages to convince Fitzhugh to play another match with Schaeffer, but he accidentally slams a door on Schaeffer's hand when a sudden appearance by Jeannie distracts him. Dr. Bellows then gets Fitzhugh to play Tony instead. With Jeannie's help, Tony is set to win the game, but this time Jeannie makes Gen. Schaffer yelp, causing Tony to miss the winning shot.
135	22	"Eternally Yours, Jeannie"	Joseph Goodson	James Henerson	March 17, 1970
Tony gets a letter from his old high school sweetheart Bonnie (Toian Matchinga), saying she is going to pay him a visit. Jeannie reads the letter, gets jealous and makes her appearance identical to the girl's in order to test Tony, but Tony witnesses her do it. Just after, and unbeknownst to Tony, Jeannie (appearing to be Bonnie) has been cornered by Roger, who, thinking she's the very attractive Bonnie, pulls her into his office and tries to get cozy. Meanwhile, the real Bonnie appears at the base and heads to Tony's office. Tony, thinking the real Bonnie is Jeannie posing, makes a pass at her, intending to teach Jeannie a lesson. But Bonnie is married to jealous, ex-football player Moose Murphy (Denny Miller), who comes after Tony when he learns of the majors' attentions to his wife.
136	23	"An Astronaut in Sheep's Clothing"	Bruce Kessler	James Henerson	March 24, 1970
After Jeannie blinks Tony a drum major's uniform for a six-month wedding anniversary, he drops a hint that he'd value a hand-made gift more than a blinked one, and takes the opportunity to praise the less-than-perfect sweater knitted for one of his colleagues by his wife. Jeannie takes the hint but goes straight to the source and tries to raise a goat for its cashmere, which she must hide from Tony, who's become suspicious. But Jeannie's not the only one hiding an anniversary surprise.
137	24	"Hurricane Jeannie"	Claudio Guzman	James Henerson	April 28, 1970
A hurricane traps Tony, Jeannie, Roger and Dr. Bellows overnight in the Nelsons' house. The doctor is amazed that the Nelson phone is the only one still working, and that dinner has been cooked by an electric stove with no electricity. When an eavesdropping Dr. Bellows sees Jeannie perform several acts of magic, Tony finally confesses that he married a genie in a bottle. But the situation is not quite what it appears. Note: This was both the very last episode actually filmed and was intended to air as the series finale. However, the final two episodes were pre-empted, thus shuffling their broadcast dates to follow this episode.
138	25	"One Jeannie Beats Four of a Kind"	Michael Ansara	Perry Grant, Richard Bensfield	May 19, 1970
General Schaeffer tells Major Healey of a card shark fleecing men at NASA. Dr. Bellows and the General joke that Tony is the card shark after he beats Roger, the General, Dr. Bellows and their guest, state Senator Martino (Herbert Rudley), in a poker game. The next poker night finds sore loser Roger earning all the winnings, with Jeannie's help. In a third round, Jeannie blinks up a magic chair whose occupant will win, intending it for General Schaeffer, who's displeased about his recent losses. But Martino is in fact the card shark they seek, and he must now explain to "The Boss" why he keeps losing, despite his cheating. His losing streak gets worse as Jeannie blinks up tricks that expose him at the last game. Guest star: Walter Burke as The Boss
139	26	"My Master, the Chili King"	Claudio Guzman	James Henerson	May 26, 1970
Tony's cousin Arvel (Gabriel Dell) persuades Jeannie to give Tony "financial security" as a surprise present by marketing his homemade chili, with Tony's picture on every can. Jeannie does not realize that Tony is not allowed to endorse products. She proceeds to distribute cans of the chili to all the local supermarkets, which Tony has to chase down and get rid of. Guest star: Dick Van Patten as Market Clerk Note: This is a posthumous appearance of Vinton Hayworth (died May 21, 1970) as General Schaeffer.

=== TV movies ===
No.	Title	Directed by	Written by	Original release date
M1	"I Dream of Jeannie... Fifteen Years Later"	William Asher	Dinah Kirgo, Julie Kirgo (story); Irma Kalish (story and teleplay)	October 20, 1985
Jeannie has been happily married for 15 years to her astronaut husband Tony Nelson (Wayne Rogers) and has a teenage son, T. J. (Mackenzie Astin). After Tony is promoted to Colonel and is about to retire from the NASA space program, he breaks his promise to Jeannie by going on one last space flight. Jeannie is furious and she separates from Tony, thinking herself to be a more independent modern woman. Note: Larry Hagman was unavailable for filming so Wayne Rogers stepped in to play the Tony Nelson role.
M2	"I Still Dream of Jeannie"	Joseph L. Scanlan	April Kelly	October 20, 1991
Col. Nelson is on a top secret space mission for NASA and Jeannie doesn't know of his whereabouts. To make matters worse, Jeannie cannot remain in the plane of reality for more than three months without an earthly master, and Tony has been absent nearly that long. So she begins a desperate search for a temporary master, which leads her to a singles bar and various misadventures.
