= Queen Esther: A Story from the Bible =

- Directed by: John T. Coyle
- Screenplay by: James K. Friedrich; John T. Coyle; H. W. Romberg
- Based on: Book of Esther
- Produced by: James K. Friedrich
- Starring: Ottilie Kruger; Richard Hale; Addison Richards
- Cinematography: C. Arthur Feindell
- Edited by: Thomas Neff
- Music by: Edward Kilyeni
- Production company: Cathedral Films
- Release date: November 1947
- Running time: 50 minutes
- Country: United States
- Language: English
- Budget: $80,606

Queen Esther: A Story from the Bible is a 1947 American biblical drama film produced by Reverend James K. Friedrich and directed by John T. Coyle. Starring Ottilie Kruger in the title role, it is the first sound film adaptation of the Bible's Book of Esther.

== Synopsis ==
A Jewish man reads the biblical story of Esther to his family.

== Cast ==
- Ottilie Kruger as Esther (as Ottile Kruger)
- Richard Hale as Mordecai
- Addison Richards as Haman
- Charles Evans as King Xerxes
- Cy Kendall as the chamberlain (as Cyrus Kendall)
- Charles Jordan as a scribe
- Rick Vallin as Joram
- Michael Ansara as Zabad
- Virginia Wave as Haman's wife
- Douglas McEachin as a court judge

== Production ==
The film was first announced in May 1947 as The Story of Esther. This was the film debut of Ottile "Ottilie" Kruger, who was the daughter of actor Otto Kruger. It was shot at Nassour Studios in Hollywood.

== Reception ==
Queen Esther: A Story from the Bible premiered in New York and Philadelphia in 1947. A prominent Jewish professor said the film is "a significant contribution to the vitalization of the common religious heritage we share and the common religious tasks which we face."

== Bibliography ==
- Suit, Kenneth (2018). James Friedrich and Cathedral Films The Independent Religious Cinema of the Evangelist of Hollywood, 1939-1966. Lexington Books. ISBN 9798216299189.
