= The Lady in the Bottle =

- I Dream Of Jeannie episode
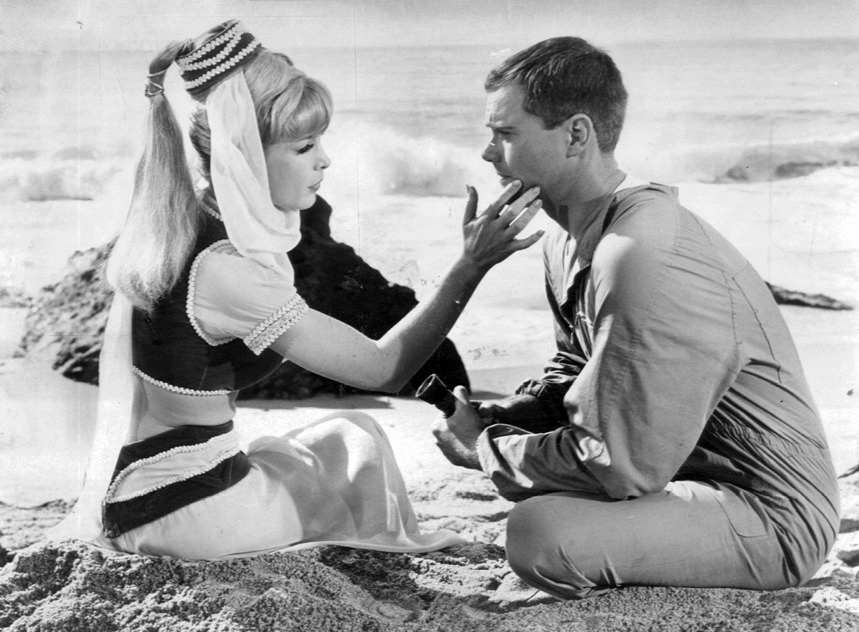
- Anthony Nelson meets Jeannie.
- Episode no.: Season 1 Episode 1
- Directed by: Gene Nelson
- Written by: Sidney Sheldon
- Original air date: September 18, 1965

Episode chronology
← Previous —	Next → "My Hero?"

"The Lady in the Bottle" is the pilot episode of the American fantasy sitcom I Dream of Jeannie. It was written by series creator Sidney Sheldon and directed by Gene Nelson, and originally aired on NBC on September 18, 1965. It would not air again until Fall 1970, when the series went into syndication.

== Plot ==
Captain Anthony Nelson is orbiting the earth in a NASA rocket. When his final stage misfires, his one-man capsule, Stardust One, is unable to maintain orbit and he falls to earth near a desert island in the South Pacific. There, while gathering items on the beach to form a giant "S.O.S." in the sand, he finds an ancient bottle that seems to move on its own. When he opens it, smoke pours out, and a beautiful 2000-year-old genie appears. Dressed in harem clothing and speaking in Persian (in the unaired version of the episode, first words to him are translated on screen as,"Your wish is my command, Master"), she kisses him. At first shocked, Capt. Nelson realizes she's a genie, and that she has the power to get him off the island. But the language barrier hinders their communication. Frustrated, Tony idly wishes she could speak English, whereupon she begins speaking in English ("Somehow, I must find a way to please thee, Master!"). She makes it quite clear that she is a genie and that Tony is her new master. He can wish whatever he wants and she will make that wish come true. Tony tests her, again wishing a helicopter would appear to rescue him from the island. This time, she understands. After it lands nearby, Tony realizes he can't take Jeannie with him; not only can he not explain her presence, it would also complicate matters with the woman he is about to marry, Melissa Stone, the daughter of his commanding officer. Tony tells Jeannie she's free of her obligation to serve him as a genie, explaining to her, "I rescued you, you rescued me. We're even". He bids her goodbye, and heads for home. Unbeknownst Capt. Nelson she rolls her bottle into his duffel bag and returns to Cocoa Beach, Florida with him.

Upon his return to Cape Kennedy, Tony is debriefed by the base psychiatrist, Col. Alfred Bellows. When Tony tries to explain to the doctor about seeing "Jeannie", Bellows believes Tony has suffered hallucinations while stranded on the island, and that the image of the "beautiful girl on a desert island" was, in his opinion, actually that of his mother. "My mother's in Salt Lake City", Tony points out. "I'm a psychiatrist", Bellows insists. "I know a mother when I see one". After dismissing Capt. Nelson, Bellows, worried about Tony's mental health, immediately phones his superior, Gen. Wingard Stone.

In the meantime, Tony arrives home with Melissa. On hearing the shower running in his bedroom, she wonders who could be using it. Tony doesn't know, until he notices his duffel bag with the bottle protruding. He tries to shove Melissa out, but it's too late—Jeannie appears in his bedroom doorway, clad only in his shirt. Naturally, Melissa doesn't believe Tony's explanation that "she's not a girl", yelling, "It's a GIRL!!", as she storms out. Tony insists that Jeannie leave, but she won't. "Thou hast set me free. That means that I am free to please thee", she explains. "And I am going to please thee very much...". He finally tricks her back into her bottle to get her out of the house. Before he can release her outside, a car with Gen. Stone, Dr. Bellows, and Tony's fellow astronauts, Army Capt. Roger Healey and Navy Lt. Pete Conway, pulls up. Tony quickly dumps the bottle into a nearby garbage can as they approach him. Bellows brings up Tony's hallucinations, claiming he can't reinstate him for active duty until he's certain he's "completely normal". While Tony tries to convince them he is in fact normal, a garbage truck pulls up, and the contents of the can are dumped into it—along with Jeannie's bottle. In a panic, Tony quickly races to the truck, offers the garbage men $10 for the contents, and fishes out the bottle. Bellows and the others gently steer Tony back into his house, convinced he isn't well. He tries to coax Jeannie out of the bottle to prove her existence, but she won't budge. Just as Dr. Bellows is about to phone for an ambulance, Tony giggles, telling them the whole incident was "just a gag", that he was just getting back at Roger and Pete for what they had done to him while in training. "You really had me worried, Tony", Gen. Stone nods, accepting his explanation. "I wouldn't want a son-in-law who went around seeing genies, would I?" Tony nervously agrees, as they leave, taking an opportunity to rest after the long day he's had. But his worries aren't over, as Jeannie smokes out of her bottle, boiling mad {"I trusted thee! What manner of master art thou??"}. Tony tries to explain, saying "there's just no room for you in my life". But Jeannie levitates him, changes his living room into a sultan's den, takes on Melissa's appearance and mimics her mannerisms, and passionately kisses him, after which she makes it quite clear she's not leaving. After he chases her out of his bedroom for trying to sneak under the locked door in the form of smoke, she glances at the camera and blinks the picture off. The episode is over, but she is there to stay as he reluctantly accepts the fact he's now "master" of a beautiful but stubborn genie who believes she knows what's best for him.

== Cast ==
- Barbara Eden as Jeannie
- Larry Hagman as Capt. Anthony Nelson
- Hayden Rorke as Dr. Alfred Bellows
- Philip Ober as Gen. Wingard Stone
- Karen Sharpe as Melissa Stone
- Bill Daily as Capt. Roger Healey
- Don Dubbins as Lt. Pete Conway, USNR
- Baynes Barron as Commander Ben Roberts
- Joe Higgins as Second Garbage Man
- Richard Reeves as First Garbage Man (Charlie)
- Warren J. Kemmerling as Husband
- Patricia Scott as Wife

== Production credits ==
- Producer: Sidney Sheldon (for Screen Gems)
- Music: Richard Wess
- Director of Photography: Fred Jackman
- Art Directors: Ross Bellah & Philip Jefferies
- Film Editor: Al {Asa} Clark, A.C.E.
- Set Decorator: Richard Mansfield
- Costume Designer: Gwen Wakeling
- Make-up Supervision: Ben Lane, S.M.A.
- Sound Effects: Sid Lubow
- Production Supervisor: Seymour Friedman
- Post-production Supervisor: Lawrence Werner
- Assistant Director: Herb Wallerstein
- Animated Title: DePatie-Freleng Enterprises (uncredited)

== Production ==
The episode was shot from December 2, 1964 to December 4, 1964 in black-and-white film (some reruns of the episode air digitally colorized). The unaired version of the pilot episode submitted to NBC in February 1965 has a running time of 31 minutes, with additional scenes and dialogue that were deleted from the final version that aired. NBC bought the pilot to make a full-length series.
