= I Dream of Jeannie =

American fantasy sitcom (1965–1970)

- Genre: Sitcom; Fantasy
- Created by: Sidney Sheldon
- Directed by: Gene Nelson; Hal Cooper; Claudio Guzmán; Larry Hagman; Michael Ansara
- Starring: Barbara Eden; Larry Hagman; Bill Daily; Hayden Rorke; Emmaline Henry
- Theme music composer: Richard Wess (season 1); Hugo Montenegro (seasons 2–5); Buddy Kaye (seasons 2–5)
- Opening theme: "Jeannie"
- Composers: Hugo Montenegro; Richard Wess; Nelson Riddle; Van Alexander; Sonny Burke
- Country of origin: United States
- Original language: English
- No. of seasons: 5
- No. of episodes: 139 (30 episodes in black and white, also colorized, and 109 in color) (list of episodes)

Production
- Executive producer: Sidney Sheldon (1967–1970)
- Producers: Sidney Sheldon (1965–1967); Claudio Guzmán (1967–1970)
- Cinematography: Lothrop Worth
- Editor: William Martin
- Camera setup: Single-camera
- Running time: 25 minutes
- Production companies: Sidney Sheldon Productions; Screen Gems

Original release
- Network: NBC
- Release: September 18, 1965 – May 26, 1970

Related
- I Dream of Jeannie... Fifteen Years Later; I Still Dream of Jeannie; Jeannie

I Dream of Jeannie is an American fantasy sitcom television series created by Sidney Sheldon and starring Barbara Eden as a beautiful but guileless 2,000-year-old genie and Larry Hagman as an astronaut with whom she falls in love and eventually marries. Produced by Screen Gems, the show originally aired for 139 episodes over five seasons, from September 18, 1965, to May 26, 1970, on NBC.

== Plot ==
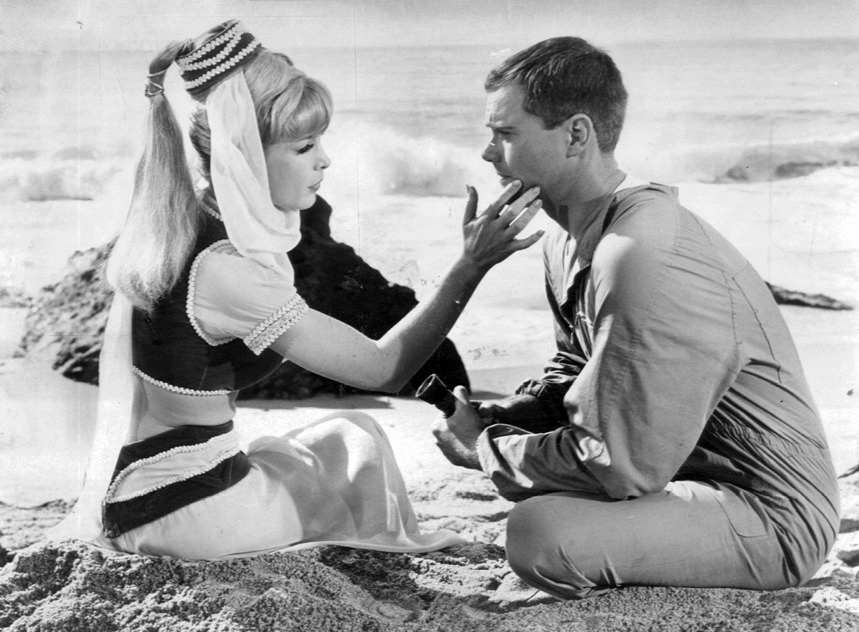
Jeannie, free from her bottle, meets Tony on the beach in the pilot episode, "The Lady in the Bottle".

In the pilot episode, "The Lady in the Bottle", astronaut Captain Tony Nelson, United States Air Force, is on a space flight when his one-man capsule Stardust One comes down far from the planned recovery area, near a deserted island in the South Pacific. On the beach, Tony notices a strange bottle that rolls by itself. When he rubs it after removing the stopper, smoke spews out and a beautiful Persian-speaking female genie materializes and surprises Tony by kissing him.

They initially struggle to communicate until Tony expresses his wish that "Jeannie" could speak English, after which she does. Then, per his instructions, she "blinks" and causes a recovery helicopter to show up to rescue Tony, who is so grateful he tells her she is free. But Jeannie re-enters her bottle and rolls it among Tony's things. When the recovery crew arrives on the beach, they unknowingly pack the bottle with the rest of Tony's supplies.

In episode 4 of season 1, Jeannie helps to break up Tony's engagement to his commanding general's daughter, Melissa. Neither she nor the general are ever seen or mentioned again, which makes for an implied subtextual relationship between the main characters.

At first, Tony keeps Jeannie in her bottle most of the time, but he finally relents and allows her to enjoy a life of her own. However, her life is devoted mostly to his, and most of their problems stem from either Jeannie's love for him or her often-misguided efforts to please him. She continues in her attempts, unbothered by Tony's obvious preference to do things for himself. Jeannie's magical mischief—and Tony's efforts to cover it up—constantly put him under the scrutiny of NASA's resident psychiatrist (and Tony's commanding officer), Colonel Dr. Alfred Bellows. A running theme throughout the series has Bellows as the only eyewitness to Jeannie's antics, while Tony (and sometimes his best friend and fellow astronaut, United States Army Captain Roger Healey) are also present. Tony offers far-fetched explanations to Bellows, who then tries to prove to his superior officers that Tony is either crazy or hiding something. But his efforts typically backfire, and in the end his superiors never buy them. And, after Bellows is invariably foiled, he proclaims, "He's done it to me again!"

Another frequently used plot device is Jeannie's loss of her powers when she is confined in a closed space. For example, she is unable to leave her bottle while it is corked, and under certain circumstances the next person who removes the cork becomes her new master.

For the first 16 episodes, Roger is unaware of Jeannie's role in Tony's life, although they meet in episode 12. When Roger finds out she is a genie, he steals her bottle, thereby becoming her new master. Roger is good-natured but also girl-crazy, and often schemes to achieve a vain or selfish gain. He occasionally has hopes of becoming Jeannie's master so he can exploit her powers for selfish ends, but he is generally respectful of the relationship between Tony and Jeannie. Tony and Roger are both promoted to the rank of major late in the first season. In later seasons, Roger's role is retconned to portray him as having known about Jeannie from the beginning (i.e., as his having been with Tony on the space flight whose touchdown led to their discovering Jeannie).

Jeannie's evil twin sister, mentioned in a second-season episode (and also named "Jeannie"—since, as Barbara Eden's character explains it, all female genies are named "Jeannie"—and also portrayed by Barbara Eden in a brunette wig), proves to be scheming and underhanded starting in the third season (as in her initial appearance in "Jeannie or the Tiger?"), repeatedly trying to steal Tony for herself and to make herself Tony's real "master". Her final attempt in the series comes shortly after Tony and Jeannie are married, with a ploy involving a man played by Barbara Eden's real-life husband at the time, Michael Ansara. (In a kind of in-joke, while Jeannie's sister pretends to be attracted to him, she privately scoffs at him.)

Early in the fifth season, Jeannie is called upon by her uncle Sully (Jackie Coogan) to become queen of their family's native country, Basenji. Tony inadvertently gives grave offense to Basenji national pride regarding their feud with neighboring Kasja. To regain favor, Tony is required by Sully to marry Jeannie and to avenge Basenji's honor by killing the ambassador from Kasja when he visits NASA. After Sully manages to put suspicion on Tony for various assassination attempts on the ambassador, Tony responds in a fit of anger that he is fed up with Sully and his cohorts and that he would not marry Jeannie even if she were "the last genie on earth". Hearing this, Jeannie despairs, leaves Tony and returns to Basenji. With Jeannie gone, Tony realizes how deeply he loves her. He flies to Basenji to win Jeannie back. Upon their return, Tony introduces Jeannie as his fiancée. She dresses as a modern American woman in public (as she had in multiple previous episodes). This changed the show's premise: now the object is to hide Jeannie's magical abilities rather than her existence.

== Cast and characters ==
=== Main ===
- Barbara Eden as Jeannie, a beautiful, loyal, and powerful but mischief-prone genie from the fictional nation of Basenji, who becomes a servant to whomever unseals her bottle.
- Larry Hagman as Captain/Major Anthony "Tony" Nelson, an astronaut and U.S. Air Force officer who discovers Jeannie.
- Bill Daily as Captain/Major Roger Healey, Tony's best friend and fellow astronaut, and a U.S. Army officer, whom Tony entrusts with Jeannie's secret.
- Hayden Rorke as Colonel Alfred Bellows, MD, a psychiatrist and Tony's suspicious superior.

=== Recurring ===
- Barton MacLane as General Martin Peterson (seasons 1–4, 35 episodes)
- Emmaline Henry as Amanda Bellows (seasons 2–5, 34 episodes)
- Vinton Hayworth as General Winfield Schaeffer (seasons 4–5, 20 episodes)
- Philip Ober as Brigadier General Wingard Stone (season 1, episodes 1 and 4)
- Karen Sharpe as Melissa Stone (season 1, episodes 1 and 4)
- Abraham Sofaer as Haji, master of all the genies (seasons 2–3)
- Michael Ansara as The Blue Djinn (season 2, episode 1), also as King Kamehameha (season 3, episode 19), last as Major Biff Jellico (season 5 episode 12), and directed "One Jeannie Beats Four of a Kind" (season 5 episode 25)
- Barbara Eden as Jeannie's evil sister, Jeannie II (seasons 3–5), who schemes to steal Tony from Jeannie
- Jackie Coogan as Sully, Jeannie's uncle, who calls upon her to become the queen of Basenji during an armed conflict

The role of Jeannie's mother is played by a few actresses:

- Florence Sundstrom (season 1, episode 2)
- Lurene Tuttle (season 1, episode 14)
- Barbara Eden (season 4, episodes 2 and 18)

== Episodes ==
Season	Episodes	Originally released	
Season	Episodes	First released	Last released
1	30	September 18, 1965	May 9, 1966
2	31	September 12, 1966	April 24, 1967
3	26	September 12, 1967	March 26, 1968
4	26	September 16, 1968	May 12, 1969
5	26	September 16, 1969	May 26, 1970
TV movies		October 20, 1985	October 20, 1991

== Production ==
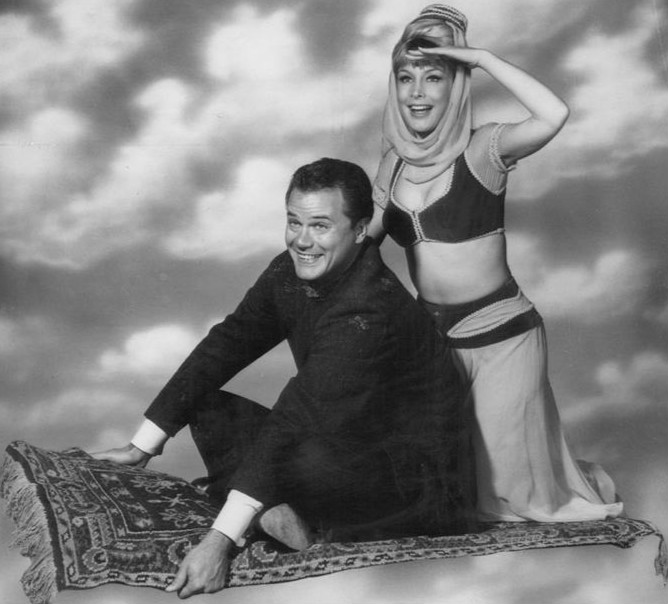
Tony and Jeannie

=== Background ===
The series was created and produced by Sidney Sheldon in response to the great success of rival network ABC's Bewitched series, which had debuted in 1964 as the second-most watched program in the United States. Sheldon, inspired by the 1964 film The Brass Bottle, conceived of the idea for a beautiful female genie. Both I Dream of Jeannie and Bewitched were Screen Gems productions.

When casting was opened for the role of Jeannie, producer Sidney Sheldon couldn't find an actress who could play the role the way he'd written it. He had one specific rule: he didn't want a blonde genie because that would make the character too similar to the Bewitched lead character. However, after many unsuccessful auditions, he called Barbara Eden's agent. (Coincidentally, Eden had co-starred in The Brass Bottle as Sylvia Kenton.)

The show debuted on Saturday, September 18, 1965, at 8 pm on NBC. NBC began broadcasting most of its prime-time television lineup in color in the fall of 1965, which made Jeannie one of two programs that remained in black-and-white; in Jeannie's case, it was to facilitate the special photographic effects on magic sequences. By the second season, visual effects in color were possible. By 1966, all prime-time series in the United States were shot in color.

Sheldon originally wanted to film season one in color, but NBC did not want to pay the extra expense; the network (and Screen Gems) believed the series would not make it to a second season. Sheldon offered to pay the extra $400 an episode needed for color filming at the beginning of the series, but Screen Gems executive Jerry Hyams advised him: "Sidney, don't throw your money away."

=== Opening sequence ===
The first few episodes after the pilot (episodes two through eight) used a non-animated, expository opening narrated by Paul Frees; the narration mentions that Nelson lived in "a mythical town" named "Cocoa Beach" in "a mythical state called 'Florida'". The remaining episodes of the first season featured an animated sequence that was redone and expanded in season two, at which point the show switched from black-and-white to color. This new sequence, used in seasons 2–5, featured an animated depiction of the initial meeting in the pilot episode, with Captain Nelson's space capsule splashing down on the beach, and Jeannie dancing out of her bottle (modified to reflect its new decoration) and then kissing Nelson before the bottle sucks her back in at the end. Both original versions of the show's animated opening sequence were created by animator Friz Freleng.

=== Setting ===
Although the series was set in and around what was then known as Cape Kennedy, Florida, and Major Nelson lived at 1020 Palm Drive in nearby Cocoa Beach, filming took place in California. The exterior of the building where Nelson and Major Healey had offices was actually the main building at the NASA Flight Research Center (renamed as the "NASA Dryden Flight Research Center" in March 1976 and as the "Armstrong Flight Research Center" in 2014) at Edwards Air Force Base, north of Los Angeles. "If you look at some of those old episodes, it's supposed to be shot in Cocoa Beach, but in the background you have mountains—the Hollywood Hills," Bill Daily said. In fact, the home used as Major Nelson's (also used as the Anderson house in Father Knows Best, and then the home of Mr. Wilson in Dennis the Menace) was located at the Warner Bros. Ranch, in Burbank (on Blondie Street). Many exteriors were filmed at this facility. Interior filming was done at the Sunset Gower Studios (the original Columbia Pictures studio lot) in Hollywood.

The cast and crew only made two visits to Florida's Space Coast, both in 1969. On June 27, a parade in Cocoa Beach escorted Eden and the rest of the cast to Cocoa Beach City Hall, where she was greeted by fans and city officials. They were then taken to LC-43 at Cape Canaveral, where Eden pressed a button to launch a Loki-Dart weather rocket. They had dinner at Bernard's Surf, where Eden was given the State of Florida's Commodore Award for outstanding acting. Later, the entourage went to Lee Caron's Carnival Club, where Eden was showered with gifts and kissed astronaut Buzz Aldrin on the cheek, just two weeks before the Apollo 11 launch.

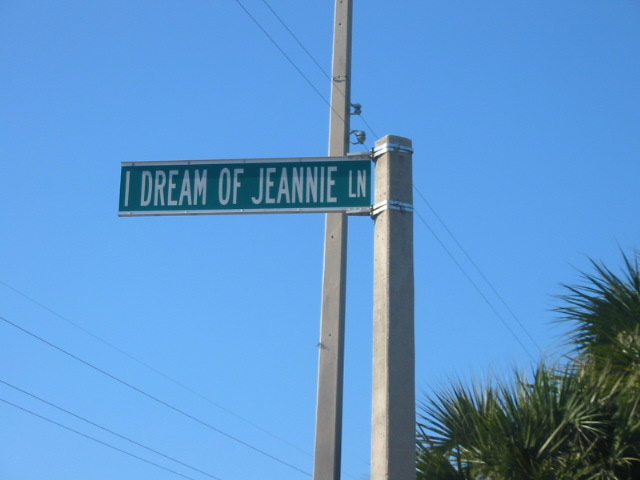
I Dream of Jeannie Lane sign in Cocoa Beach, Florida

The cast and crew returned on November 25, 1969, for three days for a mock wedding of Eden and Hagman staged for television writers from around the nation (timed to coincide with the airing of the nuptials episode on December 2) at the Patrick Air Force Base Officers Club. Then-Florida Governor Claude R. Kirk, Jr. attended and cut the cake for the couple.

Eden returned 27 years later, in July 1996, as a featured speaker for Space Days at the Kennedy Space Center. Cocoa Beach Mayor Joe Morgan presented her with an "I Dream of Jeannie Lane" street sign, which was later installed on a short street off Florida State Road A1A near Lori Wilson Park.

On September 15, 2005, the area held a "We Dream of Jeannie" festival, which included a Jeannie look-alike contest. Plans for one in 2004 were interrupted by Hurricane Frances and Hurricane Jeanne. However, a Jeannie look-alike contest was held in 2004, with Bill Daily attending.

On August 24, 2012, Cocoa Beach City leaders honored the show with a roadside plaque outside Lori Wilson Park.

=== Jeannie's origin ===
In the first season, the audience learns that Jeannie had originally been a mortal human, that she had been turned into a genie by "The Blue Djinn," and that her family is "just peasants from the old country". The topic is revisited in season two in the episode "How to be a Genie in 10 Easy Lessons", though nothing is made clear concerning her origin.

In the third season, Jeannie's origin is retconned, and the dialog implies she'd always been a genie. All her relatives are also depicted as genies, including, by the fourth season, her mother (also played by Barbara Eden beginning in Season 4, Episode 2 "Jeannie and the Wild Pipchicks"). This new narrative concerning her origins was retained for the rest of the series.

=== Theme music ===
The first-season theme music was an instrumental jazz waltz written by Richard Wess. Sidney Sheldon became dissatisfied with Wess's theme and musical score. From the second season on, it was replaced by a new theme titled "Jeannie", composed by Hugo Montenegro with lyrics by Buddy Kaye. Episodes 20 and 25 used a rerecorded ending of "Jeannie" for the closing credits with new, longer drum breaks and a different closing riff. The lyrics were never used in the show.

Songwriters Gerry Goffin and Carole King wrote a theme, called "Jeannie", for Sidney Sheldon before the series started, but it was not used.

A popular cover version of the Jeannie theme was released in 1985 in the compilation Television's Greatest Hits: 65 TV Themes! From the 50's and 60's by TVT Records. This recording was later sampled in several songs, such as DJ Jazzy Jeff and the Fresh Prince's debut single "Girls Ain't Nothing but Trouble" (from their 1987 debut album Rock the House), and also for the Ben Liebrand 1990 re-release of American hip-hop artist Dimples D.'s single, "Sucker DJ".

DNA featuring Suzanne Vega released "Tom's Diner" in 1990. A compilation album called Tom's Album the following year included variations on the song; one of these was "Jeannie's Diner" by Mark Jonathan Davis, which mashes up the Vega/DNA song with the Montenegro theme. This track was used by Nick at Nite for promos of its I Dream of Jeannie reruns.

=== The bottle ===
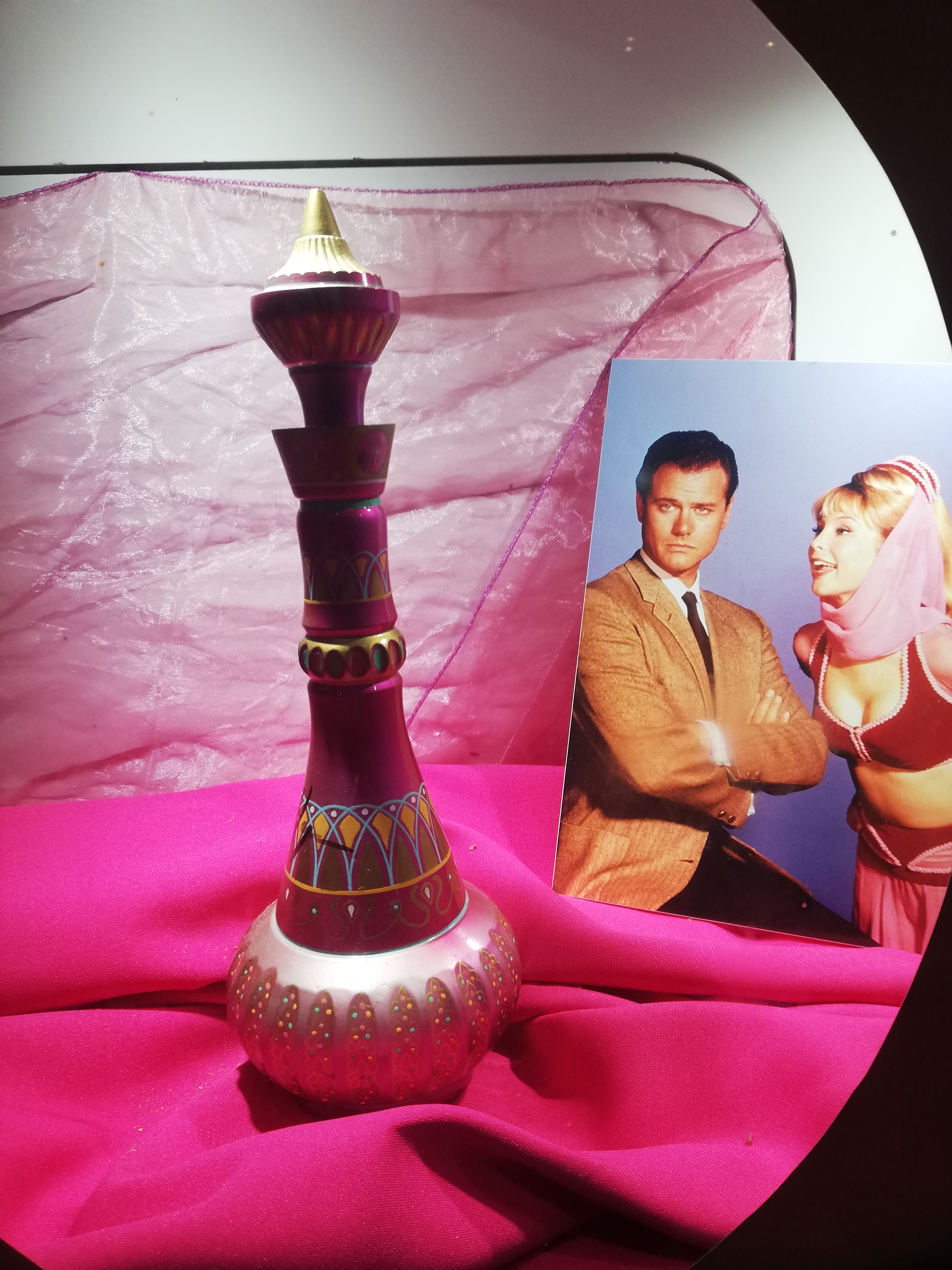
An original I Dream of Jeannie bottle prop (Museum of Style Icons, Ireland)

Jeannie's iconic bottle was not created for the show. The actual bottle was a special Christmas 1964 Jim Beam liquor decanter containing "Beam's Choice" bourbon whiskey. It was designed by Roy Kramer for the Wheaton Bottle Company. For years, Sidney Sheldon was said to have received one as a gift and thought it would be a perfect design for the series. Several people in the Screen Gems art department also take credit for finding the bottle. There's strong evidence, however, that first-season director Gene Nelson saw one in a liquor store, bought it, and brought it to Sheldon.

Jeannie's bottle was a dark, smoke-green color, with a painted gold-leaf pattern (to make it look like an antique) during the first season. The plot description of the pilot episode in TV Guide in September 1965 referred to it as a "green bottle". In that first episode, it also looked quite rough and weathered. Since the show was originally filmed in black-and-white, a lot of colors and patterns were not necessary. When the show switched to color, the show's art director came up with a brightly colored purple bottle to replace the original. The later-colorized version of the show's first season tried to make the smoked glass look of the original bottle look purple to match the look of the bottle used in the second through fifth seasons.

The first-season bottle had a clear glass stopper that Tony took from a 1956 Old Grand-Dad Bourbon bottle in his home, since the original stopper was left behind on the beach where Tony found Jeannie. In the first color episode, Jeannie returns to the beach, and her bottle is seen to have its original stopper (painted to match the bottle), presumably retrieved by her upon her return there. The rest of the TV series (and the films) used the original bottle stopper. (During some close-ups, one can still see the plastic rings that hold the cork part of the stopper in place.)

During the first (black-and-white) season, the smoke effect was usually a screen overlay of billowing smoke, sometimes combined with animation. Early color episodes used a purely animated smoke effect. Sometime later, a live smoke pack, lifted out of the bottle on a wire, was used.

Jeannie's color-episodes bottle was painted mainly in pinks and purples, while the bottle for the Blue Djinn was a first-season design with a heavy green wash; Jeannie's sister's bottle was simply a plain, unpainted Jim Beam bottle.

No-one knows exactly how many bottles were used during the show, but members of the production crew have estimated that around 12 bottles in all were painted and used. The stunt bottle, used mostly for the smoke effect, was broken frequently by the heat and chemicals used to produce Jeannie's smoke. In the pilot episode, several bottles were used for the opening scene on the beach; one was drilled through the bottom for smoke, and another was used to roll across the sand and slip into Tony's pack. Two bottles were used from promotional tours to kick off the first season, and one bottle was used for the first-season production.

Barbara Eden got to keep the color stunt bottle used on the last day of filming the final episode of the series. It was given to her by her makeup woman after the show was canceled and while it was on hiatus. According to the DVD release of the first season, Bill Daily owned an original bottle, and according to the Donny & Marie talk show, Larry Hagman also owned an original bottle.

In the third-to-last episode, "Hurricane Jeannie", Nelson dreams that Dr. Bellows discovers Jeannie's secret, and that Jeannie's bottle is broken when dropped. A broken bottle is shown on camera. This was intended to be the series' final episode and is often shown that way in syndication.

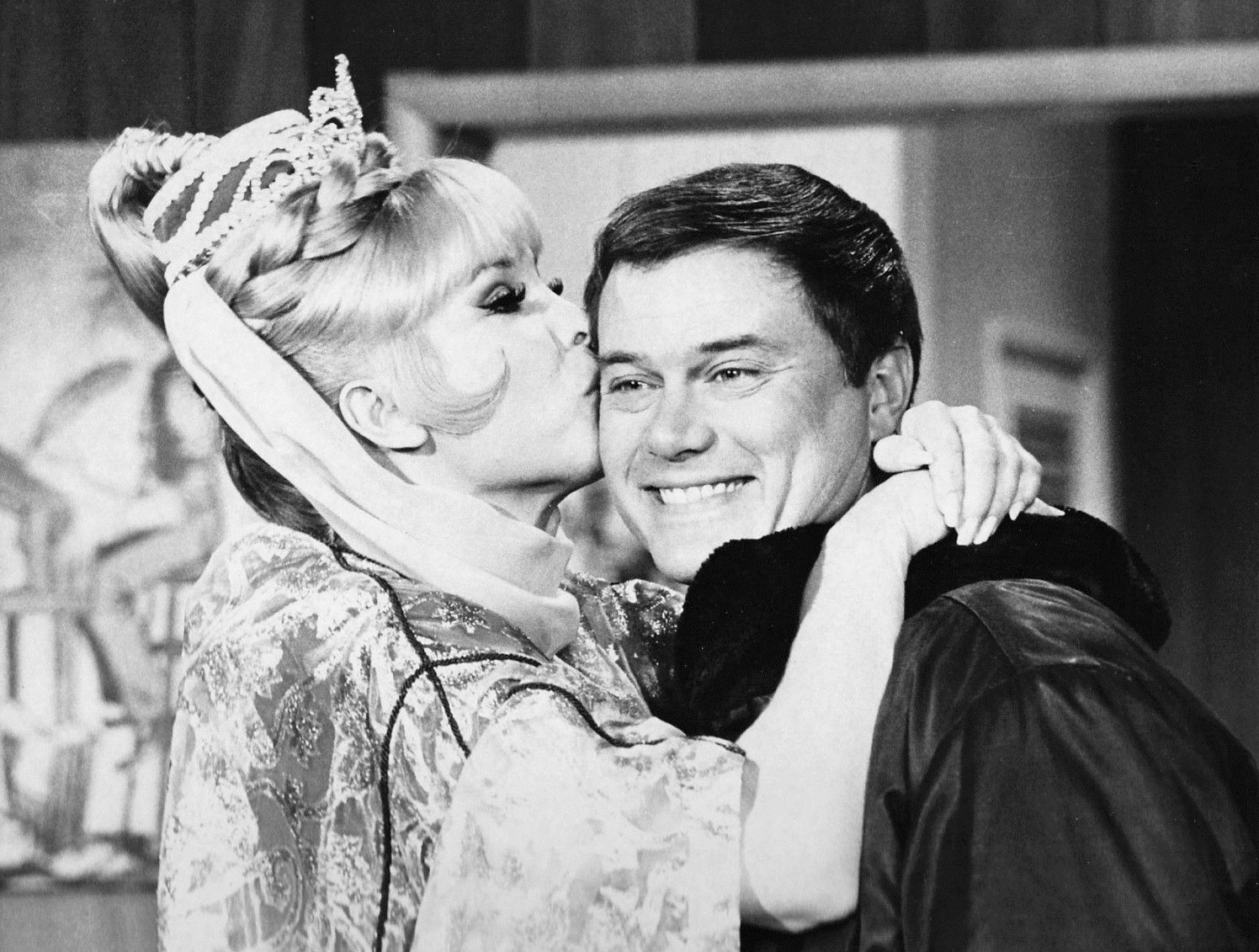
Jeannie accepts Tony's marriage proposal in "Guess Who's Going to Be a Bride? Part 2" (October 7, 1969)

=== Multi-part story arcs ===
On several occasions, multipart story arcs were created to serve as backgrounds for national contests. During the second season, in a story that is the focus of a two-part episode and a peripheral plot of two further episodes (the "Guess Jeannie's Birthday" contest began with the opening two-part episode on November 14, 1966, concluding with the name of the winner revealed after the end of the fourth episode, "My Master, the Great Caruso", on December 5), it was established that Jeannie did not know her birthday, and her family members could not agree when it was, either. Tony and Roger use NASA's powerful new computer and horoscopic guidance based on Jeannie's traits to calculate it. The year is quickly established as 64 BC, but only Roger is privy to the exact date, and he decides to make a game out of revealing it. This date became the basis of the contest. Jeannie finally forces it out of him at the end of the fourth episode: April 1.

In a third-season four-part episode ("Genie, Genie, Who's Got the Genie?" January 16 – February 6, 1968), Jeannie is locked in a safe bound for the Moon. Any attempt to force the safe or use the wrong combination will destroy it with an explosive. Jeannie is in there so long that whoever opens the safe will become her master. The episodes spread out over four weeks, during which a contest was held to guess the safe's combination. This explains why Larry Hagman is never seen saying the combination out loud: His mouth is hidden behind the safe, or the shot is on Jeannie when he says it. The combination was not decided until just before the episode aired, with Hagman's voice dubbed in. Over the closing credits, Barbara Eden announced and congratulated the contest winner, with 4–9–7 as the winning combination.

In the fourth season, a two-part episode, "The Case of My Vanishing Master" (January 6–13, 1969), concerned Tony's being taken to a secret location somewhere in the world while a perfect double takes his place at home. A contest was held to guess the location to which Tony had been taken. Unlike in earlier contests, the answer was not revealed in an episode. At the end of "Invisible House For Sale" (February 3, 1969), a special "contest epilogue" had Jeannie and Tony reveal the "secret location", Puerto Rico, followed by the name of the "Grand Prize Winner".

== Release ==
=== Syndication ===
When reruns debuted on New York's WPIX, Jeannie won its time period with a 13 rating and a 23 share of the audience. The series averaged a 14 share and 32 share of the audience when WTTG in Washington, DC began airing the series. It was the first off-network series to best network competition in the ratings: "The big switch no doubt representing the first time in rating history that indies (local stations) have knocked over the network stations in a primetime slot was promoted by WPIX's premiere of the off-web Jeannie reruns back to back from 7 to 8 pm."

It airs on Antenna TV weekdays at 11:00am & 11:30am ET and Saturdays at 9:00pm & 9:30pm ET. It has also been added back to the weekday schedule of FETV at 2pm ET.

In India, Sony Entertainment Television showed the series dubbed in Hindi in the late 1990s. It started airing again on Zee Cafe in India in 2020.

In Italy, the series aired on Rai 1 under the name Strega per amore (Witch for Love) from 1977 until 1980, then repeated on Paramount Channel from 2020 until 2021.

In France, TF1 aired the series dubbed in French from 1993 to 1998.

=== Home media ===
==== DVD/Blu-ray ====
Sony Pictures Home Entertainment has released all 5 seasons of I Dream of Jeannie on DVD in regions 1, 2 & 4 in individual season releases and complete series box sets (there were two different packaging versions for the complete series of 20 discs). The first season was made available in both the original black & white and colorized editions — only the colorized version was included in the complete series releases from Sony.

On August 27, 2013, it was announced that Mill Creek Entertainment had acquired the R1 rights to various television series from the Sony Pictures library including I Dream of Jeannie. They rereleased the first two seasons on DVD on April 1, 2014; Mill Creek released season one in its original black-and-white format only as they did not have the rights to Sony's colorized version. On October 6, 2015, Mill Creek Entertainment rereleased I Dream of Jeannie: The Complete Series on DVD in region 1, though it did not port over both of the special features found on the first season of the Sony releases. Mill Creek Entertainment released the entire series on Blu-ray, after several delays, on November 30, 2021. However, rather than a true remastered HD, Mill Creek simply used an SD master upscaled to 1080i.

In Australia, a repackaged complete series DVD collection was released on November 23, 2010. On November 4, 2015, a 50th anniversary edition of the complete series was released. On July 6, 2016, all five individual seasons were rereleased as well as another complete series collection, distributed through Shock Entertainment.

Finally, Via Vision Entertainment, through its premium boutique Imprint Television, released the complete series on region-free Blu-ray with a street date of February 26, 2025. This 22-disc limited edition set includes deluxe hardbox packaging, 300-page hardcover booklet, black & white season 1 episodes (SD colorized versions as well), all bonus features found on the Sony DVDs, the 1985 TV movie I Dream of Jeannie... Fifteen Years Later, and all 139 episodes presented in 1080p high-definition. A DVD version was also released on April 30, 2025, with the same extras, minus the TV movie.

DVD/Blu-ray releases
DVD name	No. of episodes	Release dates		
DVD name	No. of episodes	Region 1	Region 2	Region 4
The Complete First Season	30	March 14, 2006	May 23, 2006	July 19, 2006
The Complete Second Season	31	July 11, 2006	October 17, 2006	November 22, 2006
The Complete Third Season	26	January 30, 2007	May 8, 2007	May 10, 2007
The Complete Fourth Season	26	September 11, 2007	October 24, 2008	December 9, 2008
The Complete Fifth and Final Season	26	July 8, 2008	January 15, 2009	December 9, 2008
The Complete Series	139	November 11, 2008	October 26, 2009	November 23, 2009
I Dream of Jeannie...Fifteen Years Later	Movie	January 1, 2013	—	—
The Complete Series (Mill Creek)	139	October 6, 2015	December 31, 2016	—
The Complete Series (Blu-ray)	139	November 30, 2021	—	February 26, 2025

==== VHS ====
Some episodes were released on VHS. This is a complete list.

Name	No. of episodes	Release date	Additional information
I Dream of Jeannie (3 VHS boxed set)	6	September 24, 1996	2 episodes per cassette (6 episodes)
I Dream of Jeannie: Waiter, There's a Girl in My Bottle	2	September 24, 1996	The Lady in the Bottle (S1, E1); My Hero (S1, E2)
I Dream of Jeannie: Risky Business	2	September 24, 1996	The Second Greatest Con Artist in the World (S3, E3); Everybody's a Movie Star (S3, E7)
I Dream of Jeannie: Jeannie Ties the Knot	2	September 24, 1996	The Wedding (S5, E11); My Sister, the Homewrecker (S5, E12)
I Dream of Jeannie: Jeannie's Seein' Stars	3	July 7, 1998	The Biggest Star in Hollywood (S4, E19); Help, Help, a Shark (S5, E21); My Master, the Chili King (S5, E26)
I Dream of Jeannie: A Genie in Training	3	July 7, 1998	Happy Anniversary (S2, E1); My Master, the Weakling (S3, E5); My Son, the Genie (S3, E13)
I Dream of Jeannie Collector's Edition: Bellows' Fellows	4	May 22, 1995	My Master, the Spy (S2, E18); My Master, the Swinging Bachelor (S2, E30); The Mod Party (S2, E31); Fly Me to the Moon (S3, E1)
I Dream of Jeannie Collector's Edition: The Healy Factor	4	May 22, 1995	Richest Astronaut in the World (S1, E17); What's New, Poodle Dog? (S2, E6); The World's Greatest Lover (S2, E14); Haven't I Seen Me Someplace Before? (S3, E26)
I Dream of Jeannie Collector's Edition: Magical Misfires	4	May 22, 1995	Permanent House Guest (S1, E24); Who Are You Calling a Jeannie? (S3, E8); Jeannie and the Great Bank Robbery (S3, E12); Dr. Bellows Goes Sane (S4, E11)
I Dream of Jeannie Collector's Edition: Magical Occasions	4	May 22, 1995	Happy Anniversary (S2, E1); The Girl Who Never Had a Birthday Part 1 (S2, E10); The Girl Who Never Had a Birthday Part 2 (S2, E11); The Greatest Invention in the World (S2, E17)
I Dream of Jeannie Collector's Edition: Master Mischief	4	May 22, 1995	My Hero? (S1, E2); Who Needs a Green Eyed Jeannie? (S2, E9); One of Our Bottles is Missing (S2, E20); There Goes the Best Genie I Ever Had (S2, E22)
I Dream of Jeannie Collector's Edition: Once Upon a Bottle	4	May 22, 1995	The Lady in the Bottle (S1, E1); The Marriage Caper (S1, E4); My Master, the Rainmaker (S2, E4); My Wild Eyed Master (S2, E5)
I Dream of Jeannie Collector's Edition: Powerful Playmates	4	May 22, 1995	My Master, the Magician (S1, E29); My Son, the Genie (S3, E13); Djinn-Djinn, Go Home (S4, E6); How To Marry an Astronaut (S4, E10)
I Dream of Jeannie Collector's Edition: Safe Keeping	4	May 22, 1995	Genie, Genie, Who's Got the Genie? Part 1 (S3, E16); Genie, Genie, Who's Got the Genie? Part 2 (S3, E17); Genie, Genie, Who's Got the Genie? Part 3 (S3, E18); Genie, Genie, Who's Got the Genie? Part 4 (S3, E19)
I Dream of Jeannie Collector's Edition: Sibling Rivalry	4	May 22, 1995	Jeannie or the Tiger (S3, E2); Tony's Wife (S3, E11); Have You Ever had a Jeannie Hate You? (S3, E24); Operation: First Couple on the Moon (S3, E25)
I Dream of Jeannie Collector's Edition: Think Before You Blink	4	May 22, 1995	My Incredible Shrinking Master (S2, E24); Here Comes Bootsie Nightingale (S3, E10); Jeannie and the Wild Pipchicks (S4, E2); Tomorrow Is Not Another Day (S4, E3)

== Reception ==
=== Nielsen ratings ===
The show was never a major ratings hit until syndication reruns. It received its highest Nielsen ranking during the fourth season (26th).

Season	Timeslot	Rank	Rating
1965–66	Saturday at 8:00–8:30 PM	#27	21.8 (tie)
1966–67	Monday at 8:00–8:30 PM	#43	30.1
1967–68	Tuesday at 7:30–8:00 PM	#58	29.5
1968–69	Monday at 7:30–8:00 PM	#26	20.7
1969–70	Tuesday at 7:30–8:00 PM	Not in the Top 30	

== Other media ==
=== Reunion films ===
Barbara Eden starred in two made-for-television reunion films that portrayed Jeannie and Tony in the successive years. Larry Hagman did not reprise his role as Tony Nelson in either film. Bill Daily returned as Roger Healey for both films, while Hayden Rorke made a brief appearance in the first film. In 1985, Wayne Rogers played the role of retiring Colonel Anthony Nelson in I Dream of Jeannie... Fifteen Years Later. In 1991, I Still Dream of Jeannie was broadcast with Hagman's Dallas co-star Ken Kercheval essentially playing the role of Jeannie's "master". A third film was planned but never finalized.

=== Comics ===
Dell Comics published two issues of a comic book in 1966. I Dream of Jeannie returned to comics in 2001–2002 when Airwave published three stand alones.

=== Games ===
In 1965, Milton Bradley Company published a tie-in board game.

A series of I Dream of Jeannie video games released by Trendmasters for Microsoft Windows in 1995 and 1996.

A slot machine game based on the series was introduced in 2015.

=== Animated series ===
Hanna-Barbera Productions produced an animated series, Jeannie. Jeannie was originally broadcast from September 1973 to 1975, and featured Jeannie (voiced by Julie McWhirter) and genie-in-training Babu (voiced by former Three Stooges star Joe Besser) as the servants of Corey Anders, a high-school student and surfer (voiced by Mark Hamill).

=== Indian adaptation ===
The 2012 Indian sitcom Jeannie Aur Juju is an adaptation of I Dream of Jeannie. The character Jeannie was portrayed by Giaa Manek until 2013 and later by Rubina Dilaik.
