= Pat Klous =

American actress and model

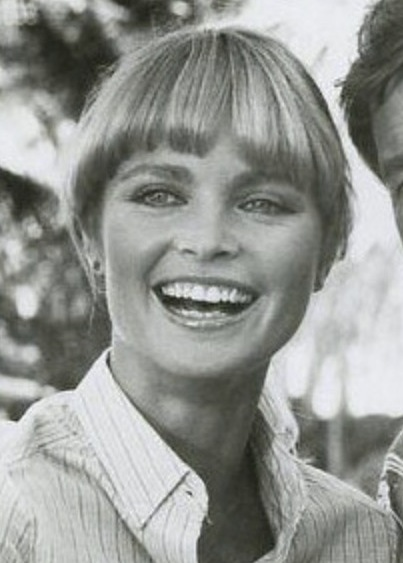
- Klous in Aloha Paradise (1981)
- Education: University of Texas (BS)
- Occupation: Actress
- Years active: 1978–2002
- Known for: Marcy Bower – Flying High; Judy McCoy – The Love Boat

Pat Klous is an American former television actress and model, best known for her roles as stewardess Marcy Bower on the CBS TV series Flying High (1978–79) and as cruise director Judy McCoy on the ABC sitcom The Love Boat (1984–1986).

== Career biography ==
Klous began her career in the 1970s as a successful model in New York City after graduating with a bachelor of science in biology and psychology from the University of Texas. In New York, executive producer Mark Carliner cast her opposite Connie Sellecca and Katherine Witt (who were also New York City-based models) in the CBS prime-time comedy-drama Flying High (1978–79) about the misadventures of three young flight attendants at the fictional Sun West Airlines. Despite high ratings in the beginning, the series eventually failed and was cancelled four months after it debuted. Klous did occasional television work afterwards during the early 1980s.

Klous portrayed Fran Linhart in the ABC-TV comedy Aloha Paradise (1981). In 1984, the producers of the long-running ABC sitcom The Love Boat tapped Klous to replace actress Lauren Tewes when Tewes was dropped from the show. On The Love Boat, Klous portrayed Judy McCoy, the sister and successor of Tewes' character as cruise director. She remained with the series until it ended in 1986.

== Filmography ==
Year	Title	Role	Notes
1978–79	Flying High	Marcy Bower	Main cast (19 episodes)
1979	A Man Called Sloane	Elsa	Episode - "Collision Course"
1979	Fantasy Island	Mary Margaret Doyle	Episode - "The Comic/The Golden Hour"
1979	The Dukes of Hazzard	Thelma Claire "T.C." Rogers	Episode - "People's Choice"
1979	Fantasy Island	Stacy Connors	Episode - "The Chain Gang/The Boss"
1980	The Misadventures of Sheriff Lobo	C.R. Jameson	Episode - "Birdie's Hot Wheels"
1981	Terror Among Us	Cathy	TV movie
1981	Aloha Paradise	Fran Linhart	Main cast (8 episodes)
1981	Fantasy Island	Lisa	Episode - "Night in the Harem/Druids"
1983	Fantasy Island	Tracy Freemont	Episode - "Nurses Night Out"
1983	Hotel	Hillary Lindamont	Episode - "Deceptions"
1983	Johnny Blue	Jenny	TV pilot episode
1984	Matt Houston	Andrea Flynn	Episode - "Waltz of Death"
1984	Matt Houston	Officer Andrea Flynn	Episode - "On the Run"
1984–86	The Love Boat	Judy McCoy	Main cast (55 episodes)
1987	Murder, She Wrote	Clare Henley	Episode - "The Bottom Line Is Murder"
