= Amy Winslow =

Amy Winslow may refer to:

- Amy Winslow, character in The Surrogate (1995 film)
- Amy Winslow, character in 1994 Baker Street: Sherlock Holmes Returns
