= Connie Sellecca =

American actress (b. 1955)

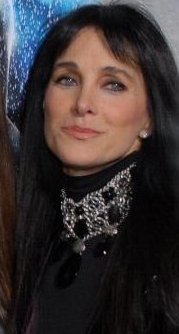
- Sellecca in 2008
- Born: Concetta Sellecchia; May 25, 1955 (age 71); New York City, U.S.
- Education: Boston College
- Occupations: Actress, spokesperson
- Years active: 1976–present
- Spouses: Gil Gerard (m. 1979; div. 1987) John Tesh (m. 1992)
- Partner: Howard Platt (1978–1979)
- Children: 2

Connie Sellecca (born Concetta Sellecchia; May 25, 1955) is an American actress, producer, and former model, best known for her roles on the television series Flying High, The Greatest American Hero, and Hotel, for which she was nominated for a Golden Globe Award for Best Actress – Television Series Drama in 1987.

== Early life ==
Sellecca was born Concetta Sellecchia in The Bronx to Italian parents, Primo Sellecchia and Marianna Acampora, who were married from 1952 until Primo's death in 1987. At age 12, she moved to Pomona, Rockland County, New York, and attended Pomona Junior High School. While attending Ramapo High School in Spring Valley, she first became interested in the performing arts. Although she attended Boston College, she withdrew to pursue a career in acting.

== Career ==
Sellecca first worked as a fashion model before making her acting debut in the 1978 television film The Bermuda Depths. She starred in a short-lived CBS comedy-drama series, Flying High, about the misadventures of three airline flight attendants, from 1978 to 1979. In 1979, she starred in Captain America II: Death Too Soon, a television movie starring Reb Brown in the title role, and slasher film She's Dressed to Kill alongside Jessica Walter. In 1980, she starred in another short-lived series, Beyond Westworld.

From 1981 to 1983, Sellecca starred as lawyer Pam Davidson in the ABC comedy drama series The Greatest American Hero, which starred William Katt and Robert Culp. After Hero ended, she was released from her contract in time to audition for the part of promotions manager Christine Francis on another ABC television drama, Hotel, which starred James Brolin. She appeared in the series from 1983 to 1988. For her performance, she received a Golden Globe Award nomination for Best Actress – Television Series Drama in 1987. In 1989, she starred in the high-rated miniseries Brotherhood of the Rose.

Sellecca played leading roles in a number of made-for-television films in 1980s and 1990s. From 1991 to 1992, she starred along with Greg Evigan in the CBS crime drama series P.S. I Luv U. From 1993 to 1994, she starred in a CBS drama series, Second Chances. Sellecca worked in two films in 2000s, I Saw Mommy Kissing Santa Claus (2001) and The Wild Stallion in 2009.

== Personal life ==
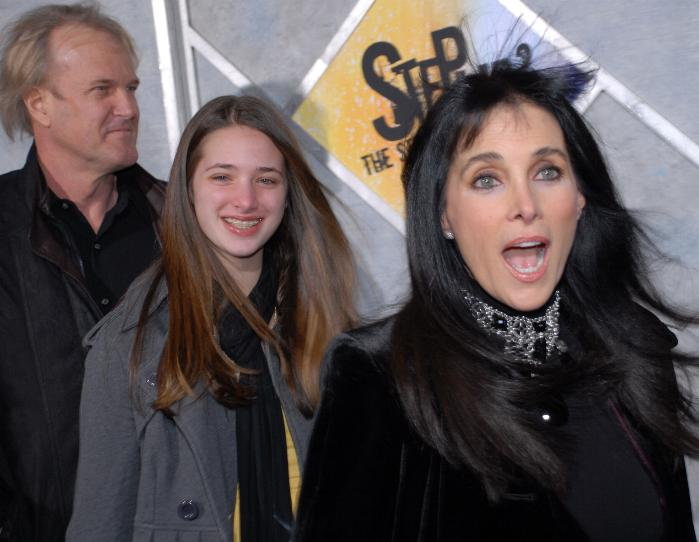
Tesh, Prima and Sellecca at the Step Up 2: The Streets premiere in 2008

Sellecca met Howard Platt in 1978, when they starred together on the television series Flying High; the couple became engaged, and moved in together, when the show's filming schedule caused a conflict, they cancelled their original December 1978 wedding date. The relationship ended before any renewed wedding date could take place. Sellecca was married to actor Gil Gerard from 1979 to 1987, and they share a son, Gib. On April 4, 1992, she married pianist and then-Entertainment Tonight host John Tesh. They have one daughter, Prima. Like Tesh, Sellecca is a Christian.

== Filmography ==
Year	Title	Role	Notes
1978	The Bermuda Depths	Jennifer 'Jennie' Haniver	TV movie
1978–79	Flying High	Lisa Benton	19 episodes
1979	Captain America II: Death Too Soon	Dr. Wendy Day	TV movie
1979	She's Dressed to Kill	Alix Goldman	TV movie
1980	Beyond Westworld	Pamela Williams	4 episodes
1981–83	The Greatest American Hero	Pam Davidson/Hinkley	41 episodes
1983–88	Hotel	Christine Francis	115 episodes Nominated — Golden Globe Award for Best Actress – Television Series Drama (1987)
1984	Finder of Lost Loves	Sara Hawthorne Nevins	Episode: "Goodbye, Sara"
1985	International Airport	Dana Fredricks	TV movie
1987	The Last Fling	Gloria Franklin	TV movie
1987	Downpayment on Murder	Karen Cardell	TV movie
1989	Brotherhood of the Rose	Erika Bernstein	Miniseries
1989	Turn Back the Clock	Stephanie Powers	TV movie
1990	Miracle Landing	Mimi Tompkins	TV movie
1990	People Like Us	Ruby Nolte Renthall	TV movie
1990	Mulberry Street	Connie Savoia	TV movie
1991–92	P.S. I Luv U	Dani Powell	13 episodes
1992	A House of Secrets and Lies	Susan	TV movie
1992	Eye of the Storm	Patricia 'Pete' Peterson	Movie
1993	Passport to Murder	Helen Hollander	TV movie
1994	She Led Two Lives	Rebecca Madison	TV movie
1993–94	Second Chances	Dianne Benedict	6 episodes
1995	A Dangerous Affair	Sharon Blake	TV movie
1995	The Surrogate	Joan Quinn	TV movie
1995	A Holiday to Remember	Carolyn Giblin	TV movie
1997	While My Pretty One Sleeps	Neeve Kearny	TV movie
1997	Something Borrowed, Something Blue	Monique D'Arcy	TV movie
1997	Doomsday Rock	Katherine	TV movie
1999	Dangerous Waters	Sarah	TV movie
2002	Anna's Dream	Leslie Morgan	TV movie
2001	I Saw Mommy Kissing Santa Claus	Stephanie Carver	TV movie
2009	The Wild Stallion	Matty	Direct-to-DVD
2012	All About Christmas Eve	Elizabeth Cole	TV movie
2013–15	Intelligence for Your Life	Herself/host	TV series
2022	A Marriage Made In Heaven	Dimitri's Mother	TV Movie
