= Flying High (TV series) =

1978 American TV series

- Still from title screen sequence
- Created by: Dawn Aldredge; Marty Cohan
- Starring: Kathryn Witt; Connie Sellecca; Pat Klous; Howard Platt
- Theme music composer: David Shire
- Country of origin: United States
- Original language: English
- No. of seasons: 1
- No. of episodes: 18 + 1 TV film (3 unaired)

Production
- Executive producer: Mark Carliner
- Producer: Robert van Scoyk
- Cinematography: Gene Polito
- Camera setup: Single-camera
- Running time: 60 minutes
- Production company: Mark Carliner Productions

Original release
- Network: CBS
- Release: August 28, 1978 – January 23, 1979

Flying High is an American comedy-drama television series, created by Dawn Aldredge and Martin Cohan, starring Kathryn Witt, Connie Sellecca, Pat Klous, and Howard Platt. The series aired on CBS from August 28, 1978, to January 23, 1979.

== Premise ==
The plot follows three attractive flight attendants (Marcy Bower, Pam Bellagio and Lisa Benton) working for the fictional Sun West Airlines in Los Angeles.

== Cast ==
- Kathryn Witt as Pam Bellagio
- Connie Sellecca as Lisa Benton
- Pat Klous as Marcy Bower
- Howard Platt as Captain Doug March
- Ken Olfson as Raymond Strickman

Platt (then age 40) and Sellecca (age 23) met on-set and developed a romantic relationship which led to a brief engagement.

Actress Tanya Roberts was at one point intended to be involved, but was dropped.

== Episodes ==
No.	Title	Directed by	Written by	Original release date
0	"Flying High"	Peter Hunt	Marty Cohan, Dawn Aldredge	August 28, 1978
Three attractive young women—Marcy, Pam and Lisa—succeed in qualifying for airline stewardess training, become fast friends as they manage to complete the tough course at Sun West Airlines Training Centre based in Los Angeles, and then start getting a taste of the rigors and fun of the real thing as rookie stewardesses, as well as getting the attention of the womanizing Captain Doug March. Meanwhile, waiting up in the air are Burt Stahl, a passenger relations representative for Sun West Airlines, and Paul Mitchell, a shy but love-hungry psychologist: Burt is trying to help Paul recover from the emotional wounds of a divorce by working his way through all the new crop of stewardess trainees alphabetically starting with the B-girls—Bellagio, Benton and Bower—and promises that if Paul surveys the trainees, he will fix him together with whichever girl strikes his fancy. Guest stars: Jim Hutton, David Hayward, Marcia Wallace
1	"Fear of Cheesecake"	Peter Hunt	Juliet Law Packer	October 6, 1978
Lisa, Marcy and Pam and the passengers get stuck in a pilotless plane spinning out of control because the entire cockpit crew are ill with gastric pains after consuming poisoned cheesecake and the stewardesses must take control of the situation; meanwhile, Lisa learns that the cheesecake she fed the pilots was contaminated. Guest stars: Bill Daily, Anne Francis, Eileen Heckart, John Hillerman, Sam Jaffe, Jerry Mathers Note: Episodes 1 and 2 were swapped in their original broadcasts to avoid negative associations with the crash of Pacific Southwest Airlines Flight 182.
2	"The Great Escape"	Nicholas Sgarro	Joyce Armor, Judie Neer	September 29, 1978
A prisoner, taken in custody, sets himself free from his guard and takes Marcy hostage on her flight; meanwhile, Pam and Lisa find themselves at the mercy of a noisy group of wild conventioneers on a stay at a San Francisco hotel. Guest stars: George Gobel, James Gregory, Roosevelt Grier, Michael Parks
3	"South by Southwest"	Peter Hunt	Dennis Palumbo	October 13, 1978
Pam, Marcy and March are involved in a pursuit with the FBI when they mistakenly take the wrong briefcase left on the airplane containing strictly confidential papers which belong to a newspaper reporter; meanwhile, Lisa finds romance with a smooth-talking presidential candidate. Guest stars: Victor Buono, Broderick Crawford, Scatman Crothers, John Gavin, Ross Martin
4	"It Was Just One of Those Days"	Alan Myerson	Dawn Aldredge, Marion C. Freeman	October 20, 1978
Pam and Lisa must cooperate with a defector from the Soviet Union and a tyrannical senior flight attendant on her last pre-retirement run; meanwhile, Marcy coaches a baseball team whose rival team's coach is March. Guest stars: Eve Arden, Rick Jason, Rose Marie, Jackie Mason, Charles Knox Robinson
5	"In the Still of the Night"	Peter Hunt	David Braff, Nick Thiel	October 27, 1978
Pam and Marcy are assigned on the flight to Miami but due to bad weather conditions, the jet is deviated to Georgia where they must spend Halloween night at a haunted hotel; meanwhile, Lisa attends a fashionable Halloween party in Connecticut and falls in love with an older, rich playboy. Guest stars: John Carradine, Anne Jeffreys, Mercedes McCambridge, Craig Stevens
6	"The Vanishing Point"	William K. Jurgensen	Joyce Armor, Judie Neer	November 3, 1978
Pam, Lisa and Marcy's flight to Los Angeles is filled with unusual travelers: a blind passenger, a nude medical student, a fear-crazed passenger, a stowaway, and Pam has a surprise reunion with an old flame whom she later suspects of being a jewel thief when a diamond pendant is missing from an old socialite on the plane. Guest stars: Bill Bixby, Hermione Baddeley, Pat Carroll, Jackie Coogan, Tom Poston, Kyle Richards, Paul Sand
7	"The Marcy Connection"	Nicholas Sgarro	Terry Ryan	November 10, 1978
Marcy's new friend Greg turns out to be a drug smuggler who tries to convince her to become his accomplice and asks that she carry a package of opium from Mexico into the USA; when Marcy tells Captain March, the girls and the police about it, they pretend to be involved in the deal to help police break the drug-smuggling ring. Guest stars: Michael Cole, Freddy Fender, Alejandro Rey, Bobby Van
8	"Fun Flight"	James Sheldon	S : William Taub; T : Robert van Scoyk; S/T : Katharyn Michaelian Powers	November 17, 1978
Marcy, Lisa and Pam are incensed when they discover that a female Sun West advertising executive suggests they wear jauntier uniforms to represent a better image to the airline; March and a male flight attendant are busy revving up the old charm and charisma to land themselves in the advertising blueprint. Guest stars: Jim Backus, Nancy Dussault, Dave Madden, Charlotte Rae, Bobby Sherman, Lyle Waggoner. Note: This episode first aired after the Star Wars Holiday Special.
9	"High Rollers"	William K. Jurgensen	Robert van Scoyk	November 24, 1978
The girls trek to Las Vegas where Pam befriends an elderly retired dentist who tells her that his psychiatrist son from Beverly Hills wants nothing to do with him and Pam shows understanding for the old man's grief; meanwhile, a Vegas nightclub star pursuses Lisa and Marcy wins at the casino. Guest stars: Lew Ayres, Shelley Berman, Dr. Joyce Brothers, Jack Carter, Jack Jones, Ann Sothern
10	"Palm Springs Weekend"	Peter Hunt	Joyce Armor, Judie Neer	December 1, 1978
The girls visit a Palm Springs resort for a romantic weekend; while Lisa is helping March try to keep his neck out of the bone-crushing grasp of a jealous boyfriend, Pam tries to figure out what to do about the ardent attention of a teenage suitor. Guest stars: Kaye Ballard, Charo, Alan Hale Jr., Jack O'Halloran, Red Skelton, Vincent Van Patten
11	"Beautiful People"	Alan Bergmann	Dawn Aldredge, Marty Cohan	December 8, 1978
Pam is sent to attend stewardesses training school for temporary duty where she meets the spoiled daughter of a Sun West executive and a scandal will lead the two women to clash; Marcy is startled to learn that the lone passenger on her flight is a very peculiar young multi-millionaire. Guest stars: Darleen Carr, Dody Goodman, Bernie Kopell, Alan Napier, Natalie Schafer
12	"Brides and Grooms"	Peter Hunt	Jerry Ross, Arthur Rabin	December 15, 1978
March attends his high school reunion in San Francisco with Pam, Lisa and Marcy; at the toga party, March is reunited with ex-girlfriend Candy, now engaged to his old friend Reggie, a fast-talking girlie magazine publisher, and when Candy's love for March is aroused once more, she feels insecure about her decision. Guest stars: Peter Brown, Robert Goulet, Art Metrano, Arnold Stang, Stephen Young
13	"Swan Song for an Ugly Duckling"	Dennis Donnelly	Terry Ryan	December 22, 1978
Marcy and Lisa struggle to reunite an estranged married couple who are also Marcy's old schoolmates; Billy Bob arrives in Los Angeles, locates Marcy and proposes marriage, and Marcy is surprised when ugly-duckling Essie Mae shows up and turns out to be Billy Bob's sweet, but neglected wife. Guest stars: Dennis Cole, Debra Feuer, Terry Lester, Melinda Naud
14	"Great Expectations"	Dennis Donnelly	Joyce Armor, Judie Neer	December 29, 1978
March, suffering from temporary blindness due to a sport injury, takes full advantage of the girls when they offer to help him recover at their apartment, but when they discover that he's faking, they plot revenge on him. Marcy must face pilot Bill, who turns to blackmail because of her unauthorized moonlighting. Guest stars: Hoyt Axton, Bill Dana, Dick Gautier, Arthur Godfrey
15	"Ladies of the Night"	Sigmund Neufeld Jr.	Laura Levine	January 23, 1979
Lisa and Marcy are mistakenly arrested as prostitutes in San Francisco; March is reunited with an old Air Force buddy who has undergone a sex change and is now an attractive woman while the girls drop in on old friends who have also undergone significant changes over the years. Guest stars: Brooke Bundy, Dan Frazer, John Hillerman, Harvey Lembeck, Marvin Kaplan
16	"Eye Opener"	Dennis Donnelly	Jerry Ross, Robert van Scoyk	N/A
March collides with a woman who sues him for $2 million because she has become frigid since the accident; the woman turns out to be Pam's friend and Pam suspects that her frigidity is triggered by her fiancé. Guest stars: Denise DuBarry, Tom Ewell, John Fiedler, Roddy McDowall, Mary Ann Mobley, Greg Mulley
17	"The Challenges"	Sigmund Neufeld Jr.	Deborah Zoe Dawson, Victoria Johns	N/A
The girls independently discover their complexes and, determined to confront their weaknesses, they choose the same training place—a nudist camp—where they find themselves embroiled in all kinds of embarrassing situations; March has to abstain from womanizing for an entire weekend if he wants to get a date with Lisa. Guest stars: Marty Allen, Barbi Benton, Perry Lang, Andrew Prine, Nipsey Russell
18	"A Hairy Yak Plays Musical Chairs Eagerly"	Dennis Donnelly	Robert van Scoyk	N/A
On her flight to Los Angeles, Pam becomes friendly with TV star Rod Hunter and, unlike the tough policeman he plays onscreen, Rod is in fact charming and courteous; meanwhile, a pregnant woman begins to undergo labor pains. Guest stars: Bill Daily, Ty Hardin, Heather MacRae, Dorothy Malone, Denny Miller, Cameron Mitchell

== Production ==
In early May 1978, CBS announced its new schedule plan for the 1978–79 season, with eight new shows including Flying High planned for 10–11 pm Friday time slot. The three protagonists, played by Kathryn Witt, Connie Sellecca and Pat Klous, were recruited from top New York modeling agencies with a specific plan to find three very attractive female models with or without acting experience. As executive producer Mark Carliner recounted at the time, when he went to visit the CBS head of program planning Harvey Shephard to pitch the show with three models in tow, the network's sales head saw them on the elevator and after learning they were pitching a show, immediately called the head of programming to say "we need this show".

The program was not exactly a unique concept—Flying High was one of a number of programs developed in the late 1970s and early 1980s in what has been called the "jiggle" era. In fact, NBC had its own show featuring stewardesses, "Coastocoast", an hour-long sitcom that the network announced as part of its 1978-79 lineup; however, it was cancelled before airing.

== Broadcast ==
A two-hour television film pilot aired on August 28, 1978, during the summer re-run season, and was the most-watched prime-time show of the week. The first regular hour-long episode aired on September 29, 1978 (the show was pre-empted a week prior by a special two-hour wedding episode of The Incredible Hulk). The first episode was meant to be "Fear of Cheesecake," in which the crew becomes incapacitated mid-flight, but due to the crash of Pacific Southwest Airlines Flight 182 CBS swapped in the more lighthearted episode "The Great Escape."

By mid-October, it was already clear that the show was in trouble due to low ratings; it ranked only 56th out of 65 shows for the week ending October 15, 1978, and did not improve, finally being yanked from the CBS schedule in January 1979.

=== Critical reception ===
The series also received negative reviews, along with The American Girls, for its representation of women as "curiously old-fashioned, if not stereotypical." Both series were seen as trying to copycat the success of Charlie's Angels, but neither succeeded.
