= I Still Dream of Jeannie =

- Genre: Comedy; Fantasy
- Based on: Original characters created by Sidney Sheldon
- Written by: April Kelly
- Directed by: Joseph Scanlan
- Starring: Barbara Eden; Christopher Bolton; Bill Daily; Al Waxman; Peter Breck; Ken Kercheval
- Music by: Ken Harrison
- Country of origin: United States
- Original language: English

Production
- Executive producer: Carla Singer
- Producer: Joan Carson
- Production locations: Vancouver; Burnaby
- Cinematography: Bert Dunk
- Editor: Stan Cole
- Running time: 92 minutes
- Production companies: Columbia Pictures Television; Jeannie Entertainment; Carla Singer Productions; Bar-Gene Television

Original release
- Network: NBC
- Release: October 20, 1991

Related
- I Dream of Jeannie... Fifteen Years Later; I Dream of Jeannie

I Still Dream of Jeannie is a 1991 American made-for-television fantasy-comedy film produced by Columbia Pictures Television (in association with Jeannie Entertainment, Carla Singer Productions and Bar-Gene Television) which premiered on NBC on October 20, 1991. It is the second and final reunion film based on the 1965–1970 sitcom I Dream of Jeannie.

Barbara Eden and Bill Daily are the only two regular cast members from the original series to reprise their roles in this film. Once again, Larry Hagman was unavailable to reprise his role of Tony Nelson, as he had just completed a 14-year run on Dallas and was taking a vacation with his family. Although the character Tony Nelson is mentioned throughout the film, and briefly appears in the animated opening sequence, he remains unseen for the rest of the film.

One of his Dallas co-stars, Ken Kercheval, appears in the film. The irony is further emphasized by the fact that Hagman and Kercheval played arch-enemies on Dallas and the character that Kercheval plays in I Still Dream of Jeannie is one that fills in the spot that would have gone to Hagman if he had been able to play Tony Nelson again for this film.

The film was directed by Joseph Scanlan and the teleplay was written by April Kelly.

== Plot ==
Colonel Tony Nelson is incommunicado on a mission for NASA. Jeannie thus does not know his whereabouts or if he will return on time to attend an important occasion. A distinguished, academic presentation speech is scheduled to be made by their son, Tony Junior. Mister Simpson, one of TJ's favorite educators, looks forward to meeting Nelson.

Jeannie goes to NASA offices to inquire with a General Wescott about her husband's mission. He merely reminds her the information is classified Top Secret.

Jeannie and TJ conspire on a b&e to steal the mission file. They are beaten to the punch by a pair of snoopers named Eddie & Guzer. These two are after information with potential black market value which they expect to find in a file titled Xenon. They make off with the file prior to Jeannie and son's arrival.

Jeannie had suspected that the General would have a misleading filing system as a security measure. She explains this to TJ who helps her seek out the code key hidden in the office. Once found, it reveals that the Nelson mission summary is in the purloined Xenon file. They later relay this hurdle to longtime family friend, Colonel Roger Healy.

Meanwhile, to make matters worse, Jeannie's jealous and mischievous sister, Jeannie II, turns up to meddle. She reminds Sham-Ir (a genie in authority) of certain mandates. Jeannie may not remain on the plane of reality for more than three months without an Earthly Master, and Tony has been away for a long time. Sham-Ir rules that Jeannie has two weeks to find either her husband Tony or an eligible new Master. If she fails, she must return to Mesopotamia forever.

Despairing of finding Nelson, Jeannie begins her desperate search for the right substitute Master. She considers men she knows. All indications are that Mister Simpson's not a bachelor, though, and being one is prerequisite to being a Master. Likewise, all regret that Healy may not fill the position as he is not unwed.

Comedy ensues with Jeannie trying the usual avenues for a woman who's single and looking. At a singles' bar, she meets a promising candidate whom she finds handsome and kind. Jeannie II surveils and intervenes. She conjures a shrew of a counterfeit wife to come in, berate the man for infidelity, and call Jeannie a bimbo. He ardently protests that neither Jeannie nor this supposed wife are what she says they are. She punches him out and carries him unconscious from the bar, firefighter style.

The overarching endeavors to sort the Nelson situation from the criminal enterprise lead to TJ crossing paths with Guzer and Eddie again. Neither party yet realizes the other's connection. Undercover as garbagemen, the two goons bicker about offering TJ a ride, gifting him a pair of shoes in his size from their cargo, and one of them moronically blabbing that the stock of shoes is stolen contraband. They regretfully take TJ prisoner and call their shady employers about sending assistance.

Under threat of forced repatriation for Jeannie and death to TJ, things begin to look hopeless for mother and son alike.

== Cast ==
- Barbara Eden – Jeannie/Jeannie II
- Christopher Bolton – Anthony "Tony" Nelson Jr.
- Bill Daily – Colonel Roger Healy
- Al Waxman – General Wescott
- Peter Breck – Sham-Ir
- Ken Kercheval – Mr. Simpson
- Brent Stait as Eddie
- Jason Schombing as Guzer
- Garry Chalk as Det. Carlyle
- Henry Crowell Jr. as Sgt. Withers
- Jackson Davies as Dave

== Production ==
I Still Dream of Jeannie was filmed from July to August 1991 in Vancouver, British Columbia, Canada. Some exterior and interior scenes, especially the NASA ones, were shot at Simon Fraser University in Burnaby, British Columbia, most notably in the Academic Quadrangle and the Mackenzie Cafe. The ski lodge and marathon scenes were filmed on location in and around Murdo Frazer Park in North Vancouver with the lodge scenes in the caretakers cottage and the marathon in both the park and on Terrace Avenue and Paisley Road. The scenes in the rundown parts of town were shot in the Downtown Eastside and Gastown. The Houston downtown scenes were shot along both Robson Street and Granville Street as the Blue Horizon Hotel and Vancouver Art Gallery street lighting can be seen in the background of some scenes. This film used the same opening sequence from I Dream of Jeannie... Fifteen Years Later with an updated version of the 1985 theme.
