= A Dangerous Affair (1995 film) =

- Genre: Thriller
- Written by: Alan Rosen
- Directed by: Alan Metzger
- Starring: Connie Sellecca; Gregory Harrison; Christopher Meloni; Rosalind Cash
- Music by: David Mansfield
- Country of origin: United States
- Original language: English

Production
- Executive producer: Robert O'Connor
- Producer: Vicky Herman
- Cinematography: Zoltan David
- Editor: Michael S. Murphy
- Running time: 96 minutes
- Production companies: Stalking Productions; Greengrass Productions

Original release
- Network: ABC
- Release: January 1, 1995

A Dangerous Affair is a 1995 American made-for-television thriller film starring Connie Sellecca and Gregory Harrison and directed by Alan Metzger. It premiered on ABC on January 1, 1995.

== Plot ==
Sharon Blake is a successful career woman who meets real-estate agent Robert Kenzer while attending a party and they soon begin a passionate affair. But when she ends the affair, Sharon finds herself being stalked and harassed by her obsessed ex-lover who becomes violent and delusional.

== Cast ==
- Connie Sellecca as Sharon Blake
- Gregory Harrison as Robert Kenzer
- Christopher Meloni as Tommy Moretti
- Rosalind Cash as Dr. Robertson
- John Marshall Jones as Detective Weber
- Jo de Winter as Sharon's Mother
- Robin Bartlett as Martha
