= Miracle Landing =

1990 television film directed by Dick Lowry

- Genre: Docudrama
- Written by: Garner Simmons
- Directed by: Dick Lowry
- Starring: Connie Sellecca; Wayne Rogers; Ana Alicia; Nancy Kwan
- Music by: Mark Snow
- Country of origin: United States
- Original language: English

Production
- Producer: Dick Lowry
- Production location: Honolulu
- Cinematography: Frank Beascoechea
- Editors: Byron "Buzz" Brandt; Anita Brandt-Burgoyne
- Running time: 85 minutes
- Production company: CBS Productions

Original release
- Network: CBS
- Release: February 11, 1990

Miracle Landing (also known as Panic in the Open Sky) is a 1990 American made-for-television drama film based on an in-flight accident aboard Aloha Airlines Flight 243 that occurred in April 1988. The Boeing 737-200 was flying from Hilo, Hawaii to Honolulu, Hawaii, when it experienced rapid decompression when a section of the fuselage was torn away. With one flight attendant blown from the cabin to her death and 65 others injured, the aircraft was able to make a successful emergency landing at Kahului Airport, on Maui.

Miracle Landing stars Connie Sellecca, Wayne Rogers, Ana Alicia and Nancy Kwan. The film aired February 11, 1990, on CBS and has since been shown in syndication on network broadcasts throughout the world.

== Plot ==
In February 1988, two pilots in a flight simulator face the challenge of landing a crippled jet that experiences a cabin decompression, an engine fire and a loss of hydraulics. The three simulated emergencies foreshadow the events of Paradise Airlines Flight 243, taking place two months later. (Note: Aloha Airlines was renamed for the film.)

Three crew members: Madeleine "Mimi" Tompkins (Connie Sellecca), Captain Robert "Bob" Schornstheimer (Wayne Rogers) and Flight Attendant Michelle Honda (Ana Alicia) are flying together on Paradise Airlines Flight 243. First Officer pilot Tompkins has been selected for training to become a full Captain in the airline, having been the first female pilot to be hired by Paradise in 1979.

Paradise Airlines 243 is an inter-island flight from Honolulu to Hilo, with a return to Honolulu the same day. The flight takes off over Hilo, and soon beverage service begins. During that time, nothing out of the ordinary occurs, but soon after, David Kornberg (Will Estes), a young boy travelling with his mother (Jane Daly), calls the lead flight attendant, C.B. Lansing (Nancy Kwan) and asks her about the crack appearing in the ceiling.

At that moment, chaos breaks loose and the entire front and top half section of the airliner, apart from the cockpit and cargo hold, blows off in a clean separation. In the chaos, Michelle falls to the floor and clings to a passenger's seat, C.B. is blown from the aircraft (off-screen) and passengers are badly injured from debris and decompression. The third flight attendant Jane Sato-Tomita (Patty Toy) is thrown to the cabin floor and sustains serious head injuries, clinging to other passengers to avoid the same fate as C.B. The cockpit crew is unaware of the full scale of the disaster and believe a bomb or decompression has occurred. Soon passengers seated in the section that was not swept away have oxygen masks fall but it is useless as all the lines were destroyed. However, the aircraft was at a low altitude thus it had not affected them as badly. Mimi and Bob contact Kahului Airport to declare an emergency.

Soon, the pilots are faced with the fact they may crash and passengers would die, and both Mimi and Bob have flashbacks to her training days and his US Air Force times, respectively. Michelle has a flashback to walking the shoreline with her father who as a soldier in the Army, has died. Jane's injuries worsen and Michelle struggles to climb to her and help her. Later, she also feels she might lose it from the chaos and picks up the call phone only to find it dead.

Dorothy Hendricks (Herta Ware) leans out of the airliner and appears to be in a state of shock before her husband George (Jack Murdock) notices and pulls her back inside. Michelle then begins to instruct the passengers on a possible crash landing or water landing and passes out life jackets. Gail Kornberg becomes hysterical when she cannot get a life jacket for David, but soon is calmed by Michelle. Roy Wesler (Glenn Cannon) panics when he sees hydraulic fluid leaking from the wings. The tower alerts Kahului Fire and Rescue personnel and they arrive before the crippled jet lands. Finally after several tense minutes, Mimi and Bob are able to figure out a plan for the emergency.

After some time, the airliner lands but with difficulties in the brakes and hydraulics. The pilots were worried that the landing might result in a broken aircraft and fire, but miraculously their landing resulted in no deaths and the emergency notification allowed crews to treat and evacuate passengers immediately. The flight staff leaves the site while mourning the loss of C.B. Lansing.

== Cast ==
- Connie Sellecca as First Officer Madeleine "Mimi" Tompkins
- Wayne Rogers as Captain Bob Schornstheimer
- Ana Alicia as Michelle Honda, Flight Attendant
  - Shantel Cropper as Young Michelle Honda
- Patty Toy as Jane Sato-Tomita, Flight Attendant
- Nancy Kwan as Clarabelle "C.B." Lansing, Chief Flight Attendant
- James Cromwell as B.J. Cocker
- Jay Thomas as Ed Meyer, Maui Tower Supervisor
- Armin Shimerman as Rick, Maui Tower Controller
- Will Estes as David Kornberg
- Jane Daly as Gail Kornberg
- Herta Ware as Dorothy Hendricks
- Jack Murdock as George Hendricks
- Matt McCoy as Doug Torbel
- Glenn Cannon as Roy Wesler
- Jeff Allin as Jeff Thomas
- Kathleen Bailey as Cindy Thomas
- James Grant Benton as Kapail
- Ray Bumatai as Kili Honda
- Troy Evans as Sonny Tompkins

== Production ==
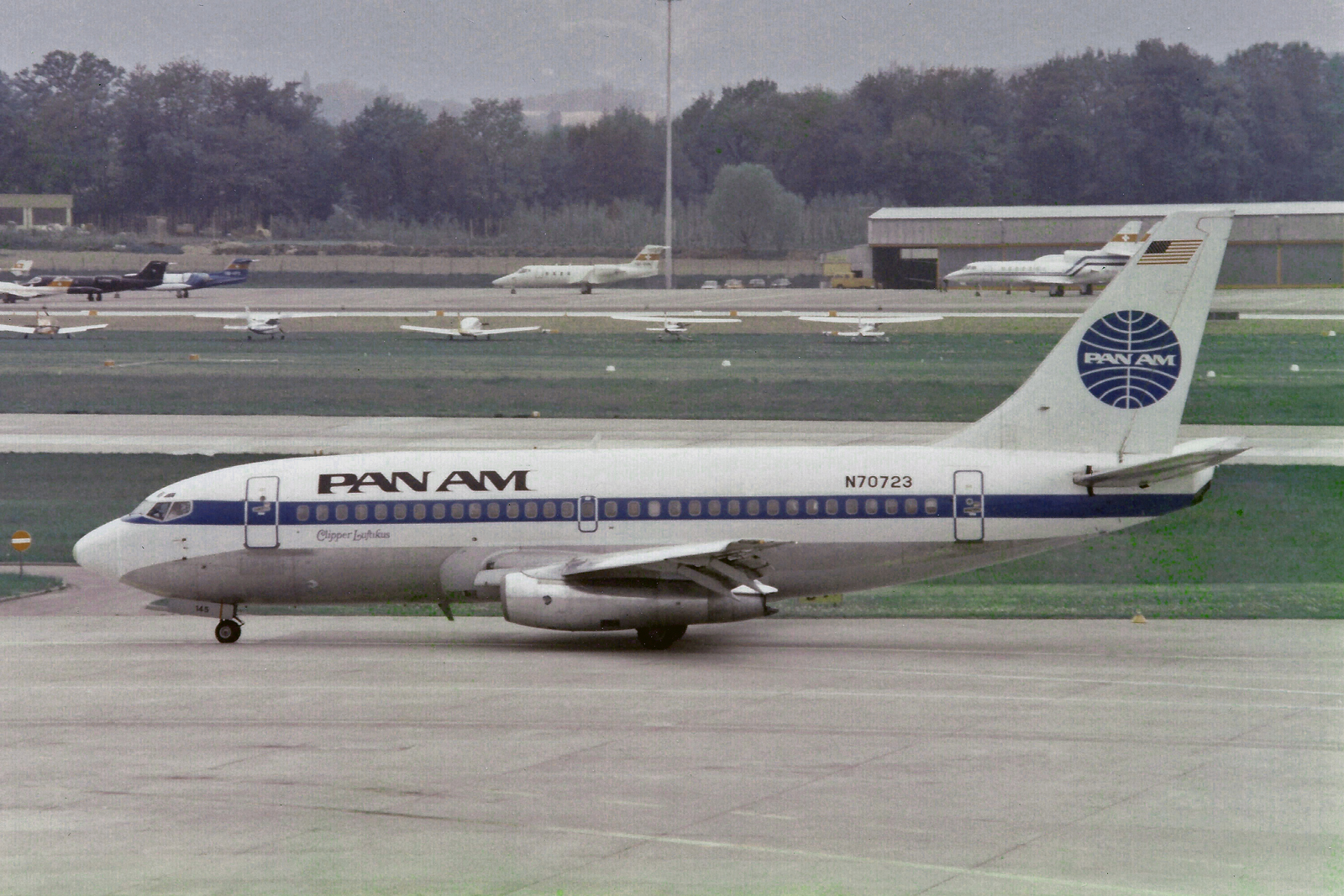
N70723, the aircraft in question, while operating for Pan Am

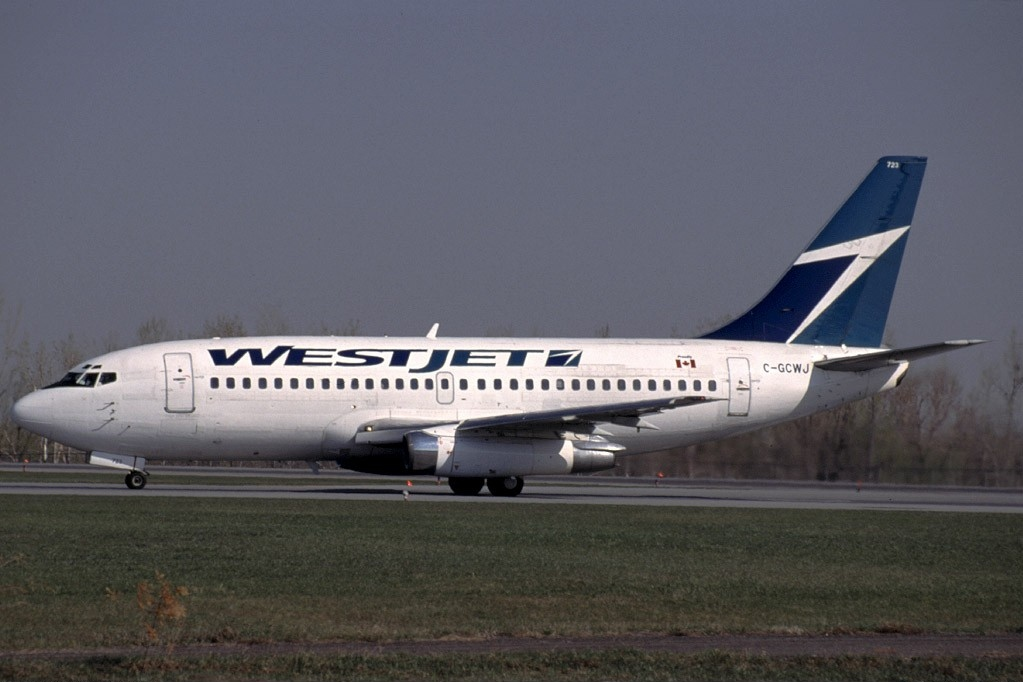
The same aircraft, operating for WestJet, under the registration of C-GCWJ

Principal photography for Miracle Landing took place in Honolulu, Oahu, Hawaii. The aircraft used for the movie, bearing the colors of the fictitious Paradise Airlines, is a Boeing 737-297CT (Advanced), registered as N70723. At the time, it was owned by Aloha Airlines, the airline involved in the Flight 243 incident. That aircraft was used by WestJet in Canada until 2002 (re-registered as C-GCWJ). The aircraft was later scrapped in 2003.

== Reception ==
Miracle Landing was considered an authentic and accurate portrayal of Aloha Airlines Flight 243. In his later review, Sergio Ortega said: "Miracle Landing is one of the most technically accurate air disaster movies ever."

Miracle Landing won the 1990 Primetime Emmy Award for Outstanding Individual Achievement in Special Visual Effects.
