= I Dream of Jeannie... Fifteen Years Later =

1985 American comedy film

- Genre: Comedy; Fantasy
- Based on: Characters created by Sidney Sheldon
- Written by: Irma Kalish
- Story by: Dinah & Julie Kirgo; Irma Kalish
- Directed by: William Asher
- Starring: Barbara Eden; Wayne Rogers; Bill Daily; Hayden Rorke; Mackenzie Astin; André De Shields; Dody Goodman
- Music by: Mark Snow
- Country of origin: United States
- Original language: English

Production
- Executive producer: Barbara Corday
- Producer: Hugh Benson
- Production locations: Walter Reed Middle School, 4525 Irvine Ave, Studio City, California; Stage 2, Warner Brothers Burbank Studios - 4000 Warner Boulevard, Burbank, California, USA
- Cinematography: Jack Whitman
- Editors: Michael F. Anderson; Bud Friedgen; William Martin
- Running time: 120 minutes (with commercials)
- Production companies: Columbia Pictures Television; Can't Sing Can't Dance Productions

Original release
- Network: NBC
- Release: October 20, 1985

Related
- I Still Dream of Jeannie; I Dream of Jeannie

I Dream of Jeannie... Fifteen Years Later is a 1985 American made-for-television fantasy-comedy film produced by Columbia Pictures Television which premiered on NBC on October 20, 1985. It is the first of two reunion films based on the 1965–1970 sitcom I Dream of Jeannie.

Barbara Eden reprises her role as the magical Jeannie; also reprising their roles from the original series were Bill Daily as Tony's fellow astronaut and best friend Roger Healy, and Hayden Rorke (in his final film role) as psychiatrist Dr. Alfred Bellows. The role of Tony Nelson was played by Wayne Rogers, best known for his role as Trapper John McIntyre on the 1970s series M*A*S*H. Larry Hagman was starring in the CBS series Dallas at the time and did not reprise his role as Tony Nelson.

The film was directed by William Asher (who was also the main director of the 1960s show Bewitched) and the teleplay was written by Irma Kalish.

== Plot ==
Jeannie has been a happily married housewife for 15 years to her astronaut husband Tony Nelson and has a teenage son, T.J. When Tony is promoted to Colonel and is about to retire from the NASA space program, Jeannie decides to give him a celebration party in their backyard. However, egged on by his colleagues to retire with a dramatic flair, Tony breaks his promise to Jeannie for one more space flight (aboard the Space Shuttle), this time with a female astronaut, Captain Nelly Hunt.

Jeannie is furious, so she decides to separate from her husband temporarily to be a more independent modern woman. In the meantime, Jeannie's always-scheming evil sister, Jeannie II is determined to have Tony for herself and she teams up with Haji, the chief genie (operating a fitness gym in the United States), to break up her sister's marriage. Jeannie II traps her sister in a bottle with a special stopper, that nobody but another genie could open.

Meanwhile, Tony's space flight is in trouble; the engines won't fire and the shuttle is on a collision course with a meteoroid.

When T.J. comes home and hears his mother trapped in the bottle, he attempts to open the bottle. At first, the stopper would not move, but his mother encouraged him to blink, like she does to invoke her powers. Jeannie encourages her son to concentrate and to blink again, this time the stopper moves. T.J. discovers that he had inherited his mother's powers and is a genie, himself. (Earlier on, T.J. sees his mother using her powers and she explains to him about his heritage, and revealing that she is a genie, and how she became a genie. She also blinked T.J. with her back to the day when she first met Tony.) After blinking, and releasing his mother from her prison, Jeannie and T.J. go to Haji, explaining the trick. Rules must have changed since 1970, because Jeannie now needs special dispensation from the chief of genies in order to do something major, like saving a human life.

Haji gives Jeannie a magic amulet and tells her to blink three times during the full moon while holding it. If she does this, Tony and the shuttle crew will be saved. But the magic comes at a terrible price—every mortal that has ever known Jeannie and T.J., including Tony, will forget that they even exist. T.J. tells his mother that they will lose dad either way, so they might as well do it so Tony lives. Jeannie invokes her magic, saving the shuttle from certain doom, and it is able to return to the ground. However, Jeannie got Haji to agree to one final night together for her and Tony, allowing Jeannie to say farewell to Tony in her heart. The next morning, while Tony is asleep, Jeannie alters the bedroom and then the house to what it might look like if Tony remained a bachelor.

With T.J., Jeannie moves on with her life. The final scene shows Jeannie and Tony passing each other on the street, and Jeannie magically gets Tony's attention, indicating that they will in fact find each other again. Before the film ends, Jeannie breaks the fourth wall and says to the viewers, "Haji made me agree to an ending. He never said there couldn't be a new beginning." The film ends with Tony following Jeannie down the street.

== Cast ==
- Barbara Eden as Jeannie/Jeannie II
- Wayne Rogers as Colonel Anthony "Tony" Nelson
- Bill Daily as Ret. Colonel Roger Healy
- Hayden Rorke as Dr. Alfred Bellows
- Mackenzie Astin as T.J. Nelson
- Dody Goodman as Scheherazade
- André De Shields as Haji
- John Bennett Perry as Wes Morrison
- Dori Brenner as Dori Green
- Nicole Eggert as Melissa
- Michael Fairman as Gen. Hatten
- Lee Taylor-Allan as Nelly Hunt
- Helen Siff as Millie

== Ratings ==
Nielsen ratings for I Dream of Jeannie... Fifteen Years Later were high. High ratings by The National Broadcasting Company (NBC) allowed for this reunion episode to be rebroadcast March 30, 1986, Easter Sunday, also in prime time.

== Production ==
I Dream of Jeannie... Fifteen Years Later was filmed at The Burbank Studios in Burbank, California from April 24, 1985, to May 1985. Barbara Eden and Wayne Rogers filmed the beach rescue scene on location at Zuma Beach in Malibu, California, using the same location the original pilot episode was shot in the year 1964.

== Home media ==
I Dream of Jeannie... Fifteen Years Later was released on DVD on January 1, 2013.

The film is also available for streaming on Tubi and The Roku Channel.
