= Aloha Paradise =

- Genre: Comedy
- Created by: Tom Greene
- Written by: Tom Greene; Michael Norell
- Directed by: Herbert Kenwith; Charlie Picerni
- Starring: Debbie Reynolds; Bill Daily
- Composer: Charles Fox
- Country of origin: United States
- Original language: English
- No. of seasons: 1
- No. of episodes: 8

Production
- Executive producers: Douglas S. Cramer; Aaron Spelling
- Producers: Lew Gallo; Michael Norell
- Camera setup: Single-camera
- Running time: 48 minutes
- Production company: Aaron Spelling Productions

Original release
- Network: ABC
- Release: February 25 – April 22, 1981

Aloha Paradise is an American comedy series that aired on ABC on Wednesday night from February 25, 1981, to April 22, 1981. The series stars Debbie Reynolds and was created by Tom Greene.

Aloha Paradise was executive produced by Douglas S. Cramer and Aaron Spelling, the same team that produced The Love Boat to which the series bore a resemblance.

== Plot ==
The series follows the lives of the staff and guests at The Paradise Village resort, located on the coast of Kona, Hawaii. Debbie Reynolds portrayed Sydney Chase, Paradise Village's manager. Bill Daily portrayed the resort's assistant manager Curtis Shea. Other staff members included Fran (Pat Klous), the resort's social director, Mokihama as bartender Evelyn Pahinui, and Stephen Shortridge as lifeguard Richard Bean. Each episode tells three or four stories about people either in love, out of love, or looking for love.

== Cast ==
- Debbie Reynolds as Sydney Chase
- Bill Daily as Curtis Shea
- Pat Klous as Fran Linhart
- Mokihama as Evelyn Pahinui
- Stephen Shortridge as Richard Bean
- Charles Fleischer as Everett

=== Guest stars ===
Aloha Paradise featured many weekly guest stars including:

- Ralph Bellamy
- Ken Berry
- Ray Bolger
- James Broderick
- Red Buttons
- Ruth Buzzi
- Nanette Fabray
- Joan Fontaine
- Grant Goodeve
- Lorne Greene
- Rosey Grier
- Lisa Hartman
- Van Johnson
- Dean Jones
- Louis Jourdan
- Audrey Landers
- Michael Lembeck
- Randolph Mantooth
- Jayne Meadows
- Pat Morita
- Don Most
- Jim Nabors
- Harriet Nelson
- Denise Nicholas
- Leslie Nielsen
- Louis Nye
- Joanna Pettet
- Gene Rayburn
- Dick Sargent
- Larry Storch
- Connie Stevens
- Jessica Walter
- Jonathan Winters
- Dana Wynter

== Episodes ==
No.	Title	Directed by	Written by	Original release date
1	"Alex and Annie / Honeymoon Blues / Everything Else"	Richard Kinon	Tom Greene	February 25, 1981
Guest stars: Laurette Spang (Unknown), Grant Goodeve (Unknown), Dean Jones (Alex), Connie Stevens (Annie St Clair), Lorne Greene (Unknown), Jayne Meadows (Unknown), Louis Jourdan (Unknown), Dana Wynter (Unknown), Van Johnson (Mr. Chase), Louanne (Robin), Misty Rowe (unknown), Jim Nabors (Himself)
2	"The Star / The Trouble with Chester / Fran's Worst Friend"	Herbert Kenwith	Unknown	March 4, 1981
Guest stars: Randolph Mantooth (Unknown), Lisa Hartman (Katie), Nanette Fabray (Unknown), Nicki Armstrong (Miss Sedley), Bert Convy (Larry Sedley), James Gregory (unknown), Penny Fuller (unknown)
3	"The Kid Who Would Be a Daddy / Make Me a Match / Treasure Hunt"	Bob Sweeney	Jonnie Johns, Tom Chehak, Rick Lenz	March 11, 1981
Guest stars: Larry Storch (Dave Peal), Jonathan Winters (Stan), Samantha Eggar (Unknown), Larry Linville (Unknown), Rachel Jacobs (Margaret), Arlene Golonka (unknown), Ken Berry (Sid), Sparky Marcus (unknown)
4	"Fantasie Impromptu / Engaged to Be Dumped / Fiona"	Bob Sweeney	Lew Gallo	March 25, 1981
Guest stars: Joan Fontaine (Herself), Brad Savage (Scott), Joanna Pettet (Fiona), Ralph Bellamy (Horace), Pat Klous (Fran), Karen Montgomery (Miss Abel), Dick Sargent (Jim), Olivia Barash (Fredi)
5	"The Best of Friends / Success / 9 Carats"	Bruce Bilson	Pablo Dickey, Rick Lenz	April 1, 1981
Guest stars: Mark Shera (Matt Shaw), Harriet Hilliard (Unknown), Michael Lembeck (Unknown), Jessica Walter (Unknown), Christopher Norris (Darcy), Gene Rayburn (Jerry), Robyn Blythe (Liza), Ray Bolger (Roy), Phil Harris (Harry)
6	"Sydney's Old Flame / Everett and the Wolf / Lurp's in Love"	Bruce Bilson	Unknown	April 8, 1981
Guest stars: Audrey Landers (Heather Dawson), Leslie Nielsen (Grant Culbertson), Don Most (Lurp), Dori Brenner (Unknown), Bob Seagren (unknown), Pat Crowley (Sondra Culbertson), Leslie Easterbrook (unknown), Hermione Baddeley (unknown)
7	"Letter from Broadway / Letter from Cyrano / Letter from a Secret Admirer"	Bruce Bilson	Jane Elizabeth Richmond	April 15, 1981
Guest stars: Pat Morita (Dr. Nakamura), Louis Nye (Unknown), Ruth Buzzi (unknown), Jared Martin (Chris), Dick Shawn (Cyrus), Debbie Reynolds (Carlotta)
8	"Catching Up / Wambling Out to Yon / Black Day at Bad Rock"	Howard Morris	Michael Norell, Barbara Allyn, Alan Foster Friedman	April 22, 1981
Guest stars: Rosey Grier (Unknown), Martha Nix (Sharon), Red Buttons (Nick), Denise Nicholas (Carrie), Gene Barry (Unknown), Pat Crowley (Unknown), Dori Brenner (Unknown), Chris Barnes (Danny)

== Production notes ==
Aloha Paradise was produced by Aaron Spelling Productions. The series' two-hour pilot episode was shot on location on the Kona Coast in Hawaii. The remaining episodes were shot on a replica beach at Universal Studios in Los Angeles.

== Reception and cancellation ==
Aloha Paradise was largely panned by critics who compared it to the more successful and long-running comedy series The Love Boat. Scheduled on Wednesdays opposite NBC's popular sitcoms Diff'rent Strokes and The Facts of Life, ratings for the series were low. As a result, ABC decided to cancel the series after eight episodes. Series star Debbie Reynolds later said Aloha Paradise had "...the worst scripts ever. That's why it failed. They didn't even advertise that I was in it. I totally disliked every script and they didn't like me interfering."
