= She's Dressed to Kill =

1979 television movie directed by Gus Trikonis

- Genre: Thriller; horror
- Written by: George Lefferts
- Directed by: Gus Trikonis
- Starring: Eleanor Parker; Jessica Walter; John Rubinstein; Connie Sellecca
- Music by: George Romanis
- Country of origin: United States
- Original language: English

Production
- Executive producers: Merrill Grant; Barry J. Weitz
- Cinematography: Thomas Del Ruth
- Editor: Ira Heymann
- Running time: 100 minutes

Original release
- Network: NBC
- Release: December 10, 1979

She's Dressed to Kill is a 1979 American television slasher film directed by Gus Trikonis and starring Jessica Walter, John Rubinstein, Connie Sellecca, Jim McMullan, Clive Revill, and Gretchen Corbett. Its plot follows a fashion designer who holds a party at her mansion, where the guests begin to get murdered. The film was also known under the title Someone's Killing the World's Greatest Models.

== Cast ==
- John Rubinstein as Alan Lenz
- Jessica Walter as Irene Barton
- Connie Sellecca as Alix Goldman
- Jim McMullan as Sheriff Halsey / Michael Barton
- Clive Revill as Victor De Salle
- Gretchen Corbett as Laura Gooch
- Barbara Cason as Deenie Gooch
- Cathie Shirriff as Kate Bedford
- Corinne Calvet as Colette
- Eleanor Parker as Regine Danton
- Peter Horton as Tony Smith
- Jonathan Banks as Rudy Striker
- Marianne McAndrew as Lorna
- Russ Marin as Oscar
- Joanna Cassidy as Camille Bentancourt

== Release ==
The film aired on NBC as a Movie of the Week on Monday, December 10, 1979.

=== Critical response ===
People magazine wrote of the film: "It’s your basic people-trapped-at-isolated-snowy-resort-with-murderer tale, but suspenseful."

== Legacy ==
The film is cited by Camille Paglia in an essay featured in her book Provocations: Collected Essays on Art, Feminism, Politics, Sex, and Education (1985).
