= Howard Platt =

American actor

- Born: Howard Thomas Platt; June 5, 1938 (age 88); Chicago, Illinois, U.S.
- Occupations: Actor; director; writer
- Years active: 1971–2008; 2017
- Spouses: Alice Marugg (m. 1969; div. 1978) Gloria Parker (m. 1998)

Howard Thomas Platt (born June 5, 1938) is an American stage and television actor, singer and director, best known for his role as Officer Hopkins on the TV series Sanford and Son (1972–76). Platt wrote and performed “Riverwinds” for LaSalle: Expedition II in 1977.

== Career biography ==
Platt has made numerous comedic and dramatic appearances on television, most recently as Rev. Weber in What About Joan? Along with his role as Hoppy on Sanford And Son, Platt has also had guest roles as Dr. Phil Newman on The Bob Newhart Show (in a total of 6 episodes), Max on Alice, Major Ted Spector on M*A*S*H, and Judge Jonathan Stockfish on Evening Shade. He portrayed 5 different characters on Barney Miller.

As a series regular he played Captain Doug March on the CBS-TV sitcom Flying High (1978–79). His many movie roles include T.R. Baskin, Nixon, The Cat from Outer Space, Three the Hard Way, and Norma Jean & Marilyn.

Since the death of Hal Williams, Platt remains the last surviving cast member of Sanford and Son.

== Directorial credits ==
As a director, Platt has directed a dozen shows including A Couple of Blaguards, Don't Dress For Dinner, Pump Boys and Dinettes, Love Letters and Steel Magnolias.

== Filmography ==
=== Film ===
Year	Title	Role	Notes
1971	T.R. Baskin	Arthur	Alternative title: A Date with a Lonely Girl
1972	Prime Cut	Shaughnessy	
1973	Snatched	First Detective	Television film
1973	Westworld	Supervisor	
1973	Cry Rape	Ben Warren	Television film
1974	Busting	Carletti	
1974	Newman's Law	Spink	
1974	Three the Hard Way	Keep	
1975	The Trial of Chaplain Jensen	Lieutenant Levin	Television film
1976	The Great Scout & Cathouse Thursday	Vishniac	
1976	The Boy in the Plastic Bubble	Neighbor	Television film
1978	Three on a Date	Frank	Television film
1978	The Young Runaways	Bubba	Television film
1978	The Cat from Outer Space	Col. Woodruff	
1978	Flying High	Captain Doug March	Television film
1979	Beyond Death's Door		
1987	Walk Like a Man	Fred Land	
1992	Overexposed	King	Television film
1995	Nixon	Lawyer at Party	
1996	Norma Jean & Marilyn	Howard Hawks	Television film
1996	The Rock	Louis Lindstrom	
1997	Vegas Vacation	Maitre d'	
1997	Blast	Janitor Supervisor	
2008	The Lucky Ones	Stan Tilson	
2017	The Hippopotamus	Supporting Artist	

=== Television ===
Year	Title	Role	Notes
1972	Love, American Style	Felix	Episode: "Love and the Tycoon"
1972	The Rookies	Reporter #2	Episode: "A Deadly Velocity"
1972–76	Sanford and Son	Officer "Hoppy" Hopkins	Recurring role (20 episodes)
1973	Owen Marshall: Counselor at Law	Cy Harmon	Episode: "A Lesson in Loving"
1973	Chase	Arnold	Episode: "The Dealer-Wheelers"
1973–76	The Bob Newhart Show	Dr. Phil Newman	Recurring role (6 episodes)
1974	The Rookies	Gentry	Episode: "Trial by Doubt"
1974	Doc Elliot	Harvey	Episode: "The Brothers"
1974	Kojak	Roy Benson	Episode: "The Only Way Out"
1974	Sons and Daughters	Ben	Episode: "The Runner"
1975	Barney Miller	Charles Hackman	Episode: "Ms. Cop"
1977	Barney Miller	Lawrence Weiskoff	Episode: "Fire '77"
1977	The Hardy Boys/Nancy Drew Mysteries	Sidney Tabor	Episode: "The Disappearing Floor"
1977	Kingston: Confidential	Grant Kibbee	Episode: "The Boston Shamrock"
1978–79	Flying High	Captain Doug March	Main cast (18 episodes)
1979	Alice	Max	Episode: "Vera Robs the Cradle"
1979	M*A*S*H	Major Ted Spector	Episode: "Yessir, That's Our Baby"
1980	Alone at Last	Harry Elliott	Television pilot
1980	Young Maverick	Mayor Leggett	Episode: "Half-Past Noon"
1980	Alice	Max	Episode: "Cook's Tour"
1980–81	Sanford	Officer "Hoppy" Hopkins	Recurring role (5 episodes)
1981	Barney Miller	Bill Nelson	Episode: "Riot"
1981	Gimme a Break!	Gus Lambert	Episode: "Your Prisoner is Dead"
1982	Barney Miller	Andrew Landry	Episode: "The Clown"
1982	Herbie, the Love Bug	Larry	Episode: "Calling Dr. Herbie"
1982	Barney Miller	Gordon Lynch	Episode: "Bones"
1984	Empire	Roger Martinson	Main cast (6 episodes)
1985	I Had Three Wives	Youngblood	Episode: "Bedtime Stories"
1985	Small Wonder	The Policeman	Episode: "Brainwashed"
1993	Flying Blind	Norman	Episode: "The Long Goodbye"
1993	Tales of the City	Mr. Wilson	Television miniseries
1993	Evening Shade	Judge Jonathan Stockfish	Episode: "Witness for the Prosecution"
1994	Silk Stalkings	Neil Jackman	Episode: "The Deep End"
2001	What About Joan?	Minister	Episode: "Betsy's Wedding"
