= The Surrogate (1995 film) =

- VHS cover
- Written by: Raymond Hartung; Elisa Bell
- Directed by: Jan Egleson; Raymond Hartung
- Starring: Alyssa Milano; Connie Sellecca
- Theme music composer: Nicholas Pike
- Country of origin: United States
- Original language: English

Production
- Executive producers: Karen Moore; Dori Weiss
- Producer: Hugh Spencer-Phillips
- Cinematography: David Geddes
- Editor: Stan Jones
- Running time: 88 minutes
- Production companies: Moore-Weiss Productions; Cannell Entertainment; New World Entertainment

Original release
- Network: ABC
- Release: October 22, 1995

The Surrogate is a 1995 television film drama directed by Jan Egleson and Raymond Hartung and aired on ABC. The film had a limited VHS release in the United Kingdom in April 1996. It has also been released on video in Asia.

The film centers around the young and talented student Amy (Alyssa Milano), who relies on an innocent advertisement for a rental place. Here, she meets Stuart (David Dukes) and Joan Quinn (Connie Sellecca). After she rents the place, she creates a good relationship with the family. After a lot of hesitation, the family asks her to be the surrogate mother of their child, since Joan can't have babies herself anymore. Amy thinks about it and agrees. When Amy discovers that the family hides a dark secret about the death of an earlier baby, Amy is determined not to give her child up and flees. Soon, the police are looking for her, because she officially kidnapped her own baby.

== Plot ==
Amy Winslow (Alyssa Milano) is an art student majoring in painting, who is all by her own. Her mother died when she was a child and her father is not around. As a student she has financial problems, so she is surprised when the couple Joan and Stuart Quinn (Connie Sellecca and David Dukes) decide to take her in their house for a small amount of rent. Little does Amy know that Joan is following her every step through secret cameras, and that she has a hidden agenda for her. Initially, Amy is very content living with the Quinns, believing that she has found the family she has never had. When she loses the university's financial aide through an administration error, Joan immediately steps in to take care of her. They both drink a large amount of wine, and then Joan announces that because she is infertile, they are looking for a surrogate mother. She then tells Amy that they feel that she is the perfect candidate. Amy is flattered, and next day discusses the situation with her friendly teacher Eric Shaw (Vincent Ventresca). She then agrees when the Quinns propose to pay for her college fees if she helps them out.

When Amy is a few months pregnant, Joan starts to show strange behavior. Amy feels smothered by Joan's overbearing attitude, feeling that she is being treated like a ten-year-old child. Her oil painting being taken away, Amy looks for it in the basement, only to find old baby clothes. Joan catches her, and becomes furious, scaring Amy away. She later tries to explain the situation by saying that she was pregnant four years ago, though had a miscarriage. Amy does not believe her story, though Eric - who was already 'warned' by Joan that Amy might act paranoid - tells her to focus on her painting, not on the Quinns.

Later that day, a strange woman drops by to meet with Joan. Joan, who was not at home by the time, is convinced that the woman is Sandy Gilman (Polly Bergen), and meets with her the next day to tell her not to come at her house ever again. Amy overhears the conversation and is worried when they discuss rumor of Joan being responsible of their biological baby Christopher's death. She is further confused when Sandy reveals herself as Joan's mother. Amy next contacts Janice, who previously lived with the Quinns, and finds out that Joan did not have a miscarriage, and that police were involved when Christopher died. Eric, informed by Amy, tries to talk to Joan, but she threatens to ruin his career if he interferes.

Meanwhile, Amy finds a video tape of Joan with Christopher, and grows convinced that Joan murdered her baby. Joan catches her watching the tape, and when Amy tries to get away, Joan accidentally shoves her off the stairs. Amy has to be rushed to the hospital, where she gives birth to a baby girl while unconscious. Joan takes the baby home, and tells Amy that she is not allowed in the home anymore. Amy then turns to the police, but they inform her that she can be arrested for breaking contract if she continues her quest to get the baby girl Christine back. Instead, Amy and Eric decide to dig into Joan's past and find out that Joan is using a false name. Joan fears that Amy will do anything to get Christine and tells Stuart they might have to 'take care' of her.

When Amy is on her way to the police to inform them about the real Joan and Stuart Quinn, she is run over by Joan before she is able to arrive at the station. Now instead, they turn to the Quinns and kidnap Christine. The Quinns use the help of their guard (Roger R. Cross) to go after her, but Eric steps in-between them, and has to be hospitalized in order for Amy to get away. Amy changes her identity and appearance and goes into hiding and renames her baby Emily. A large police investigation is started, and Amy makes newspaper headlines with the kidnapping. She heads out to Sandy to find help, but the Quinns have already suspected that she might do that and are present as well when Amy arrives. Joan tells Amy that she will not press charges if she gives up Emily, though Stuart interrupts her and admits to the suspicion surrounding the couple about the murder of their infant. He offers to not press charges if she keeps their past a secret, and allows her to take the baby. Joan, infuriated, hits Stuart on the head with an object, takes Emily out off Amy's hands and runs off. Amy follows her and they end up on the edge of a cliff. There, Joan admits that she accidentally smothered Christopher to death when he was crying and reluctantly returns Emily to Amy.

Sometime later, Amy is seen being the legal mother of Emily, and she is now in a loving relationship with Eric.

== Cast ==
- Alyssa Milano as Amy Winslow
- Connie Sellecca as Joan Quinn/Catherine Peyser
- David Dukes as Stuart Quinn
- Vincent Ventresca as Eric Shaw
- Polly Bergen as Sandy Gilman
- Scott Hylands as Detective Taggart
- Lorena Gale as Brenda
- Roger R. Cross as Guard

== Production ==
Milano, who spent most of the production with her infant co-stars, admitted that the film triggered her maternal instincts: "I was amazed at how instinctual everything was for me." Filming took place in Vancouver.

== Reception ==
Variety magazine gave the film a negative review. In the review, the crew's work was praised, but the screenplay was heavily criticized: "Telefilm, under Jan Egleson's strict direction, is supposed to be a thriller, but it's too long a reach; the thrill is gone. David Geddes' lensing creates strong atmosphere, and Ron Yoshida's editing is exemplary. Michael Nemirsky's design is suitable, and Nicholas Pike's score is satisfactory."

== Taglines ==
- It began as the perfect arrangement. It became a pact made in Hell.
- Innocent. Alone. She made a contract with evil.
