= Ken Kercheval =

American actor (1935–2019)

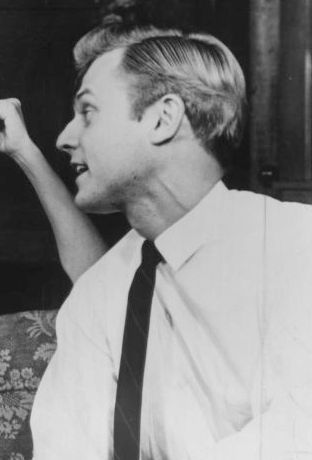
- Kercheval in 1963
- Born: Kenneth Marine Kercheval; July 15, 1935; Wolcottville, Indiana, U.S.
- Died: April 21, 2019 (aged 83); Clinton, Indiana, U.S.
- Resting place: Pisgah Cemetery, Vermillion County, Indiana, U.S.
- Education: Indiana University; University of the Pacific; Neighborhood Playhouse School of the Theatre
- Occupation: Actor
- Years active: 1962–2019
- Spouses: Ava Fox (m. 1986; div. 1993) Cheryl Paris (m. 1994; div. 2004)
- Children: 5

Kenneth Marine Kercheval (July 15, 1935 – April 21, 2019) was an American actor, best known for his role as Cliff Barnes in the television series Dallas and its 2012 revival.

== Early life ==
Kercheval was born on July 15, 1935, in Wolcottville, Indiana, to Marine "Doc" Kercheval (1899–1967), a local physician, and Christine Reiber (1903–1996), a registered nurse. He was raised in Clinton, Indiana. As a teenager, Kercheval often accompanied his father in the operating room and once put two stitches in his sister Kate when she had an appendectomy. Kercheval attended Indiana University, not to become a doctor, but to major in music and drama. He later studied at the University of the Pacific, and starting in 1956, at the Neighborhood Playhouse in New York City under Sanford Meisner.

== Career ==
Kercheval made his Broadway debut in the 1962 play Something About a Soldier. He appeared off-Broadway in the 1972 Kurt Weill revue Berlin to Broadway with Kurt Weill, and can be heard on the cast recording. His other theatre credits included The Apple Tree, Cabaret (replacing Bert Convy as Cliff), and Here's Where I Belong. In 1966, he appeared as the title character in the original Broadway production of Fiddler on the Roof, co-starring with Herschel Bernardi, Maria Karnilova, Julia Migenes, Leonard Frey, and Pia Zadora.

Kercheval gained his first television role playing the part of Dr. Nick Hunter #2 (replacing Burr DeBenning) on Search for Tomorrow in 1966. His later soap-opera roles were in The Secret Storm and How to Survive a Marriage. His film credits include The Seven-Ups with Roy Scheider and Tony LoBianco plus F.I.S.T. with Sylvester Stallone. In 1976, he co-starred in two episodes of The Adams Chronicles as James Madison.

Kercheval is best known for having played J.R.'s nemesis Cliff Barnes on the CBS television series Dallas. He starred in the show from 1978 to 1991, from its pilot episode to the series finale. He initially was cast as Ray Krebbs before being given the role of Cliff Barnes. Kercheval and Larry Hagman were the only Dallas cast members to stay with the series throughout its entire run, although Kercheval's character was only a recurring character during the first two seasons. He became a regular cast member in the 1979–1980 season. Kercheval reprised the role of Cliff Barnes in the 1996 Dallas reunion, J. R. Returns, and he appeared in the 2004 CBS reunion special. He again reprised the role in the Dallas (2012) series.

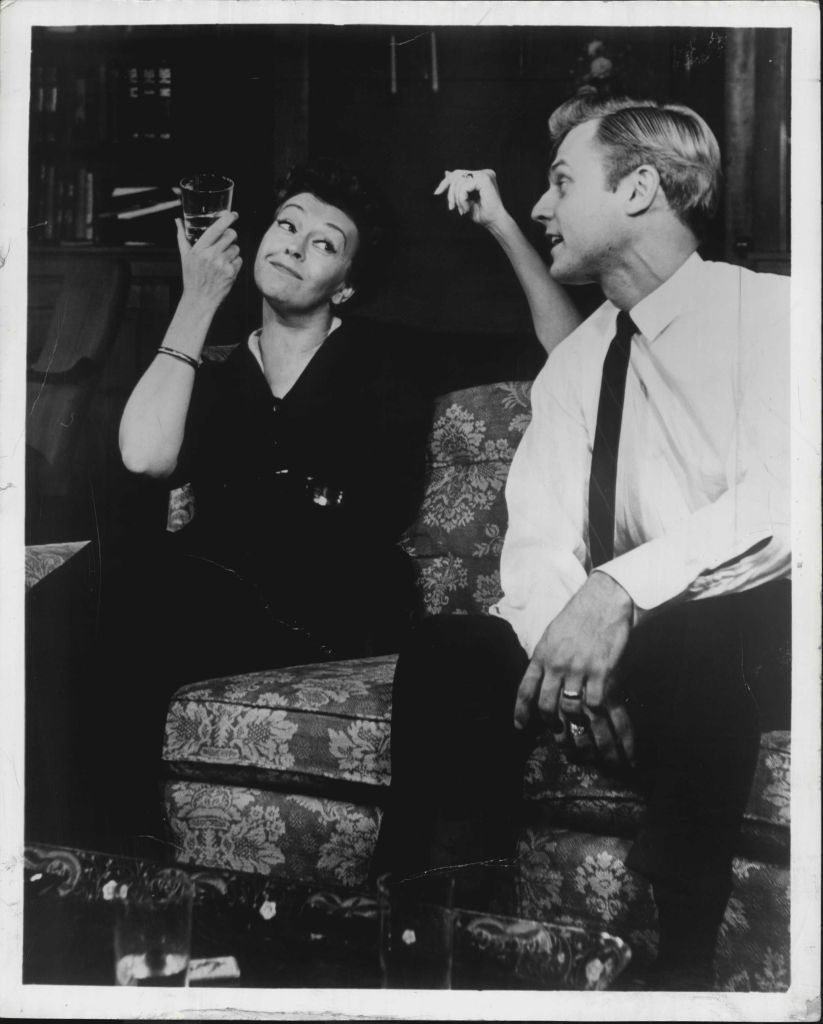
Onstage with Nancy Kelly in Who's Afraid of Virginia Woolf? (1963)

In the 1980s, he made numerous appearances on Super Password and The $25,000 Pyramid. In 1991, he appeared in the reunion movie, I Still Dream of Jeannie, playing Mr. Simpson, a guidance counselor at Anthony Nelson Jr.'s high school and was the temporary master for Anthony Jr.'s mother, Jeannie (Barbara Eden); this was because Larry Hagman, who played Tony Nelson, was not available to reprise his role, as he had not yet finished his run on Dallas – the irony being that I Dream of Jeannie was Hagman's first major series, and the actors' respective Dallas characters despised each other. He also appeared as a ballroom dance teacher in the independent film California Casanova.

In 2006, Kercheval appeared in the musical White Christmas at Southampton's Mayflower Theatre and Plymouth's Theatre Royal as the General. In 2007, he reprised his role at the Edinburgh Playhouse and the Wales Millennium Centre in Cardiff. He reprised his role in Sunderland in 2010 and at The Lowry in Salford Quay with Coronation Street actor Wendi Peters and Brookside regular Claire Sweeney from November 2012 until January 2013.

In 1985, Kercheval became a partner in the Old Capital Popcorn Company. The business thrived at first, but the partnership soured in 1988. The financial issues and other conflicts led to a 1989 armed rampage and suicide on the Dallas set by one of the partners.

== Personal life and death ==
A lifelong smoker, Kercheval was a lung cancer survivor after having had part of his lung removed in 1994.

Kercheval died of pneumonia on April 21, 2019, at the age of 83.

== Filmography ==
- Naked City (1962, TV Series) as Acting Student (uncredited)
- The Defenders (1962–1965, TV Series) as Harry Grant / Jack Wilks
- The Nurses (1965, TV Series) as Mac
- The Trials of O'Brien (1965–1966, TV Series) as Jerry Quinlan / Dr. McCahey
- Hawk (1966, TV Series) as Clark
- An Enemy of the People (1966, TV Movie) as Billing
- Pretty Poison (1968) as Harry Jackson
- Search for Tomorrow (1966, TV series regular) as Dr. Nick Hunter
- The Secret Storm (1968, TV series regular) as Archie Borman
- Cover Me Babe (1970) as Jerry
- Rabbit, Run (1970) as Barney
- The Coming Asunder of Jimmy Bright (1971, TV Movie) as Jimmy Bright
- The Seven-Ups (1973) as Ansel – Seven-Up
- Get Christie Love! (1974, TV Series) as Alec Palmer
- The Disappearance of Flight 412 (1974, TV Movie) as White
- How to Survive a Marriage (1974, TV series regular) as Larry Kirby
- Beacon Hill (1975, TV Series) as Dist. Attorney
- The Adams Chronicles (1976, TV Series) as James Madison
- Judge Horton and the Scottsboro Boys (1976, TV Movie) as District Attorney Tom Knight
- Network (1976) as Merrill Grant
- The Lincoln Conspiracy (1977) as John Surratt
- Rafferty (1977, TV Series) as Jerry Parks
- Family (1978, TV Series) as Mark Adams
- Kojak (1973–1978, TV Series) as Teddy Maclay / Professor Lacey / Ray Fromm
- F.I.S.T (1978) as Bernie Marr
- Devil Dog: The Hound of Hell (1978, TV Movie) as Miles Amory
- CHiPs (1978, TV Series) as Dr. Faraday
- Too Far to Go (1979, TV Movie) as Jack Dennis
- Starsky & Hutch (1979, TV Series) as Deputy D.A. Clayburn
- Walking Through the Fire (1979, TV Movie) as Dr. Freeman
- Here's Boomer (1980, TV Series) as Dr. Haggert
- Trapper John, M.D. (1981, TV Series) as Marty Wicks
- The Patricia Neal Story (1981, TV Movie) as Dr. Charles Canton
- The Demon Murder Case (1983, TV Movie) as Richard Clarion
- Calamity Jane (1984, TV Movie) as Buffalo Bill Cody
- The Love Boat (1981–1984, TV Series) as Lester Erwin / Don Bartlett
- Glitter (1985, TV Series) as John Ramsey Jr.
- Hotel (1983–1986, TV Series) as Frank Jessup / Leo Cooney
- You Are the Jury (1986, TV Series) as Stanley Nelson
- Mike Hammer (1987, TV Series) as A. Walter Decker
- Matlock (1987, TV Series) as Louis Devlin
- Highway to Heaven (1988, TV Series) as Richard Osbourne
- Perry Mason: The Case of the Defiant Daughter (1990, TV Movie) as L.D. Ryan
- Corporate Affairs (1990) as Arthur Strickland
- Dallas (1978–1991, TV series regular) as Cliff Barnes
- California Casanova (1991) as Willie
- Keeping Secrets (1991, TV Movie) as Frank Mahoney
- I Still Dream of Jeannie (1991, TV Movie) as Mr. Simpson
- Diagnosis: Murder: Diagnosis of Murder (1992, TV Movie) as Frank Stevens
- L.A. Law (1992, TV Series) as Al Bremmer
- Murder, She Wrote (1992, TV Series) as Alex Ericson
- Dangerous Curves (1992, TV Series) as Jimmy Douglas
- In the Heat of the Night (1993, TV Series) as Judge Lawton Gray
- Woman on the Ledge (1993, TV Movie) as Doctor Martin
- The Golden Palace (1993, TV Series) as Charlie
- Beretta's Island (1994) as Barone
- Walker, Texas Ranger (1993, TV Series) as Dr. Slade
- Lovejoy (1993, TV Series) as Rutherford Lovejoy
- Burke's Law (1994, TV Series) as Bernie Green
- A Perry Mason Mystery: The Case of the Grimacing Governor (1994, TV Movie) as Harlan Richards
- Dallas: J.R. Returns (1996, TV Movie) as Cliff Barnes
- Diagnosis Murder (1997) A Mime is a Terrible Thing to Waste as Duke Fallon
- Rusty: A Dog's Tale (1998) as Carl Winthrope
- ER (1 episode, 1998) as Mr. Zwicki
- Diagnosis: Murder (1993–2000, TV Series) as Keith Dunn / Duke Fallon / William P. Bissell / Alex Ridlin
- Blind Obsession (2001) as Harrison Pendragon
- Crossing Jordan (2002–2006, TV Series) as Claude Manning
- Corrado (2009) as Vittorio
- Dallas (2012–2014, TV Series, recurring role) as Cliff Barnes
- The Promise (2017) as Dr. Christopher Webber
- Surviving in L.A. (2019) as Charlie (final film role)
