= Bill Daily =

American actor and comedian (1927–2018)

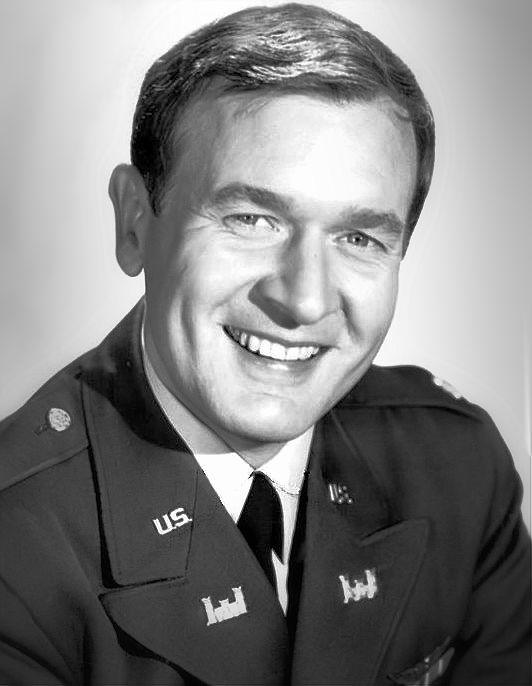
- 1969 photo from I Dream of Jeannie
- Born: William Edward Daily; August 30, 1927; Des Moines, Iowa, U.S.
- Died: September 4, 2018 (aged 91); Santa Fe, New Mexico, U.S.
- Education: Goodman Theatre School
- Occupations: Actor, comedian
- Years active: 1953–2011
- Television: I Dream of Jeannie; The Bob Newhart Show
- Spouses: Patricia Anderson (m. 1949; div. 1976); Vivian Sanchez (m. 1980; div. 1983) (Note: Some sources differ.); Becky Daily (m. 1993; died 2010)
- Children: 2

William Edward Daily (August 30, 1927 – September 4, 2018) was an American actor and comedian known for his sitcom work as Major Roger Healey on I Dream of Jeannie and Howard Borden on The Bob Newhart Show.

== Early life and early career ==
William Edward Daily was born on August 30, 1927, in Des Moines, Iowa, the son of Fern Ellis and Raymonde Daily. Two weeks after his son was born, Daily's father left his home to buy a loaf of bread and never returned. In 1939, Daily and his family moved from Des Moines to Chicago, Illinois, where he spent the rest of his youth. Following graduation from Lane Technical High School, Daily studied for a time at the Peterson Theatre School, then left home to become a professional musician, playing upright bass with jazz bands in numerous clubs across the Midwest. In the early 1950s, he was drafted into the United States Army, serving in the Korean War with an artillery unit and later with an entertainment unit.

== Comedy career ==
=== 1950s to early 1960s ===
Following his time in the Army, Daily began performing stand-up comedy and gradually began playing some of the bigger clubs in the U.S. After graduating from the Goodman Theatre School, Daily worked for the NBC television station WMAQ in Chicago as an announcer and floor manager. He eventually became a staff director. Daily stated that while preparing for a Chicago-area Emmy Award telecast, he asked Bob Newhart to come up with a routine about press agents that resulted in the routine "Abe Lincoln vs. Madison Avenue". During his days off, Daily drove to Cleveland to write, direct and perform on The Mike Douglas Show. In 1963, Steve Allen appeared on The Mike Douglas Show, saw Daily do a comedy bit and offered him a job in Los Angeles as an announcer, writer and performer on his syndicated show.

=== Mid-1960s to early 1970s ===
Daily appeared in guest spots on My Mother the Car, The Farmer's Daughter and Bewitched, before veteran sitcom writer Sidney Sheldon took notice of Daily's work and hired him for the supporting role of Army Captain Roger Healey, on I Dream of Jeannie, in 1965. As astronaut Tony Nelson's best friend and NASA colleague, Roger often helped to solve the absurd social, military or other existential dilemmas that Nelson's sultry-but-naive genie (Barbara Eden) would unwittingly cause one or both of them at Cape Kennedy, during the early years of NASA's Mercury, Gemini, and Apollo programs.

In 1972, two years after I Dream of Jeannie was canceled, Daily appeared as Howard Borden in The Bob Newhart Show. Borden, a commercial airline navigator who later becomes a co-pilot, lives across the hall from Bob Newhart's Bob Hartley character. He frequently pops into the Hartleys' apartment to borrow things, mooch a meal, or have the Hartleys take care of his visiting son.

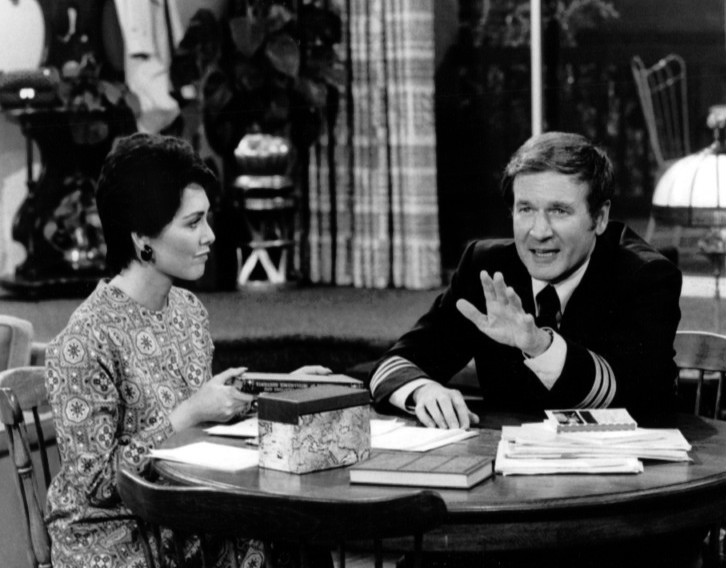
Photo from The Bob Newhart Show. Emily (Suzanne Pleshette) listens to Howard (Daily).

=== Mid-1970s to 1990s ===
Daily appeared as an occasional panelist on the 1970s CBS game show Match Game. After regular Richard Dawson's departure in 1978, Daily was a semi-regular for the final three years of the show's CBS and syndicated run.

For the two years that followed The Bob Newhart Show, Daily returned to stand-up. In 1980, after years of making a living as a second banana, Daily was offered his own show. Called Small & Frye, the program featured Daily as a neurotic doctor; it lasted for only three months before being canceled. In 1981 he starred opposite Debbie Reynolds in the short lived Aloha Paradise - a Love Boat type show based in Hawaii. Daily, a lifelong lover of magic, made three syndicated TV specials introducing young magicians, called Bill Daily's Hocus-Pocus Gang, broadcast in 1982 and 1983.

In 1987, Daily was named director of the New Mexico Film Commission.

In 1988, Daily tried his hand again at starring roles, this time as another doctor on the sitcom Starting From Scratch. The show fared slightly better than Frye, but was canceled after one season. Daily's most notable post-Newhart role was another supporting character, that of Larry the psychiatrist on ALF (1986). Jack Riley appeared as an unnamed patient, clearly reprising Elliot Carlin from The Bob Newhart Show. ALF claimed to have learned all he knew about psychology from watching the earlier series.

Daily twice reprised his I Dream of Jeannie role of Roger Healey in two made-for-TV reunion movies: I Dream of Jeannie... Fifteen Years Later (1985) and I Still Dream of Jeannie (1991). In 1990, Daily reunited with Bob Newhart as a new, overbearing neighbor in the Newhart episode "Good Neighbor Sam". Also in 1991, he reprised the role of Howard Borden in The Bob Newhart Show: The 19th Anniversary Special, broadcast on CBS in November of that year. In 1997, he was a guest star on Caroline in the City.

Although mostly retired, Daily occasionally made some live comedy and television guest appearances into the 2000s. From 2006 to February 2009, he was a guest host on radio station KBQI in Albuquerque.

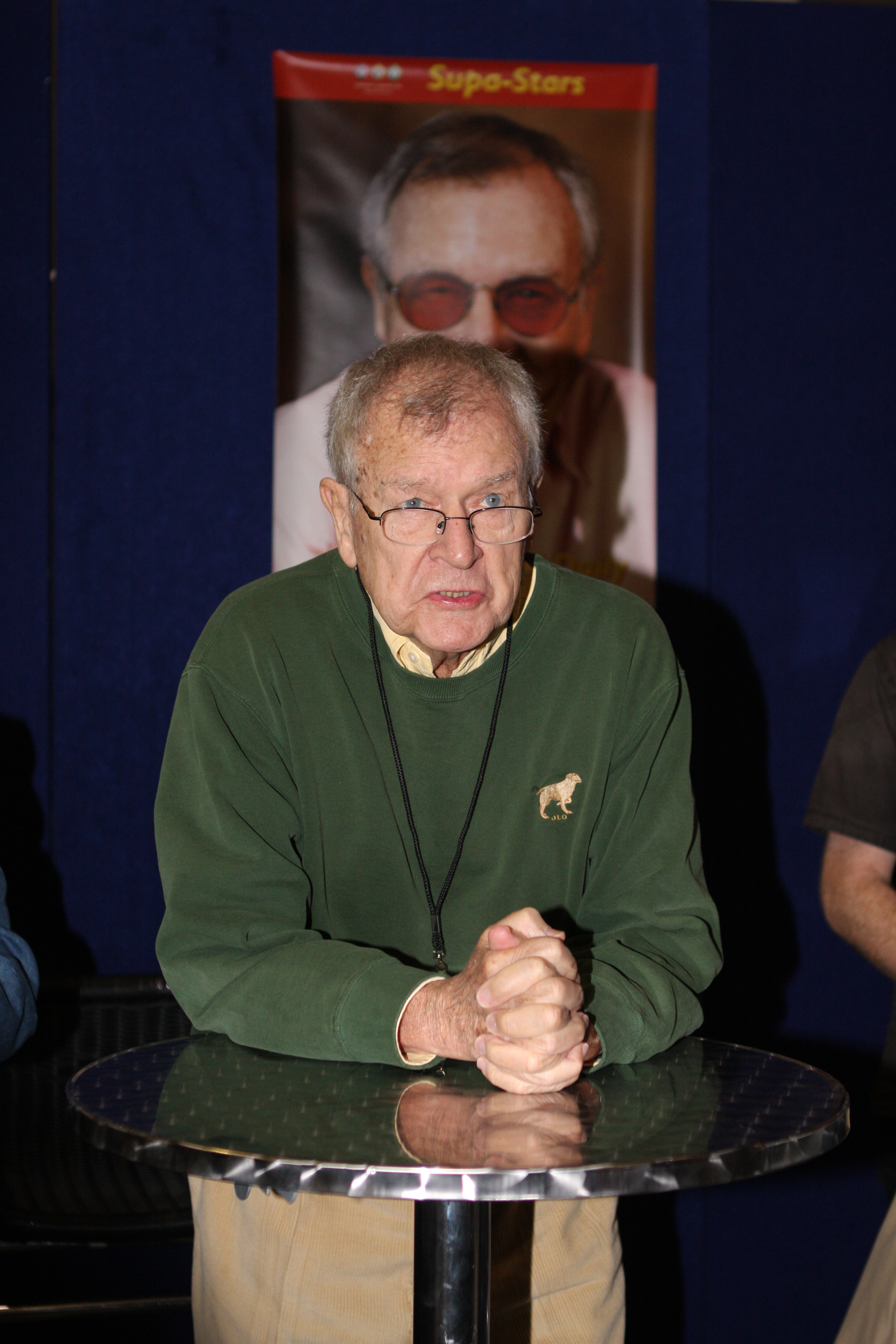
Bill Daily at the 2011 Supanova Expo in Australia

== Personal life and death ==
Daily married his first wife, Patricia Anderson, in 1949; in 1976, the couple divorced. Daily had two adopted children: a son, Patrick, and a daughter, Kimberley, who is deceased. In 1980, he married Vivian Sanchez, with whom he traveled on the road, performing Lover's Leap for two years. He and Sanchez later divorced.

In 1993, Daily married his third wife, Becky. The couple remained together until her death in 2010. His manager and publicist was Patterson Lundquist.

Daily died of natural causes on September 4, 2018, in Santa Fe, New Mexico, at the age of 91. His death was announced by his family three days later and his ashes were scattered nearby.

== Filmography ==
Film and Television
Year	Title	Role	Notes
1964	Bewitched	Mr. Johnson	Episode: "A Vision of Sugar Plums"
1965	The Farmer's Daughter	Manfred	Episode: "Katy by Moonlight"
1965–1970	I Dream of Jeannie	Captain / Major Roger Healey	131 episodes
1965	My Mother the Car	Phil Durkin	Episode: "The De-Fenders"
1965	The Farmer's Daughter	Gallery Manager	Episode: "Forever Is a Cast Iron Mess"
1969	In Name Only	Peter Garrity	TV movie
1971	The Barefoot Executive	Navigator	Comedy film (Walt Disney Productions)
1972	Love, American Style	Larry	Segment: "Love and the Single Sister"
1972	Getting Together	McAdam	Episode: "Broken-Hearted Melody"
1972	The Mary Tyler Moore Show	Pete Peterson	Episode: "His Two Right Arms"
1972–1978	The Bob Newhart Show	Howard Borden	140 episodes
1972	Love, American Style	Donald Baxter	Segment: "Love and the Country Girl"
1978	Murder at the Mardi Gras	Jack Murphy	TV movie
1978	Flying High	Bob Griffen	2 episodes
1979	$weepstake$	Fred	Episode: "Lynn and Grover and Joey"
1979	Rendezvous Hotel	Walter Grainger	TV movie
1979	CHiPs	Balford	Episodes: "Roller Disco" (Parts 1 & 2)
1979	The Love Boat	Paul Turner	Segment: "Rent a Family" (Parts 1 & 2)
1980	Valentine Magic on Love Island	Charles	TV movie
1980	Alone at Last	Larry Elliot	TV pilot
1981	Aloha Paradise	Curtis Shea	8 episodes
1982	The Powers of Matthew Star	Frank Trenton	Episode: "Daredevil"
1983	Trapper John, M.D.	Mr. Stevens	Episode: "The Spy Who Bugged Me"
1983	Small & Frye	Dr. Hanratty	6 episodes
1985	Comedy Factory	The Mayor	Episode: "Honey, It's the Mayor"
1985	I Dream of Jeannie... Fifteen Years Later	Colonel Roger Healey	TV movie
1987–1989	ALF	Dr. Larry Dykstra	4 episodes
1988–1989	Starting from Scratch	Dr. James Shepherd	22 episodes
1990	Newhart	Sam Leary	Episode: "Good Neighbor Sam"
1990	The Munsters Today	Count Strimpkin	Episode: "Thicker Than Water"
1991	I Still Dream of Jeannie	Colonel Roger Healey	TV movie
1991	The Bob Newhart Show: The 19th Anniversary Special	Howard Borden	TV special
1991	Alligator II: The Mutation	Mayor Anderson	Direct-to-video
1992–1993	Bob	Vic Victor	2 episodes
1997	George and Leo	The Pilot	Episode: "The Cameo Show"
1997	The Naked Truth	Doc	Episode: "He Ain't Famous, He's My Brother"
1997	Caroline in the City	Charlie's Father	2 episodes
2011	Horrorween	Grandpa	voice (final film role)
