= Biboy Enriquez =

Filipino businessman and cockfighter

Leandro "Biboy" Enriquez is a Filipino hotelier and a two-time world champion cockfighter. He is the founder of Miss Asia Pacific International.

He brought in the Playboy Club in the country in the 1970s. He is considered to be one of the pioneers of Manila nightlife, owning popular clubs around the city. Coming from a family of hoteliers, Enriquez has been in the hotel business since the 1960s and was the owner of The Sulô Hotel in Manila, Puerto Azul and The Silahis Hotel in Roxas Boulevard to name a few.
