= Grand Air =

Airline of the Philippines (1995–1999)

Grand International Airways
IATA	ICAO	Call sign
8L	GDI	—
- Founded: 1995
- Ceased operations: 1999
- Hubs: Ninoy Aquino International Airport
- Fleet size: 9
- Headquarters: Manila, Philippines

Grand International Airways (or GrandAir) was a short-lived airline in the Philippines which operated during the mid-to-late 1990s.

== History ==
The airline was established when the Philippine government started to deregulate its domestic aviation industry after decades of monopoly by Philippine Airlines (PAL), then wholly owned by the government. Executive Order 219, signed by President Fidel V. Ramos on 3 January 1995, removed most restrictions with regards to route structures, fares, and the adjustment of flight frequencies.

GrandAir was owned by the Panlilio family, which also owned Silahis International Hotel in Roxas Boulevard, Philippine Village Hotel (Airport Hotel) and Puerto Azul - a resort hotel in Cavite. The airline's terminal in Manila was located within the Philippine Village Airport Hotel complex.

A Temporary Operating Permit was granted in December 1994 by the Civil Aeronautics Board (CAB) to allow the airline to commence operations on the Manila-Cebu v.v. and Manila-Davao v.v. routes by February of 1995. The decision to grant a Temporary Operating Permit was challenged by Philippine Airlines, on the grounds that GrandAir did not hold a legislative franchise, and the CAB did not hold have any authority until a legislative franchise was obtained. Citing Executive Order 219, the CAB denied PAL's request, citing that the Order encouraged a minimum of two operators on each route, and that any route presently served by any operator shall be open for competition by other airlines. GrandAir was later granted a legislative franchise through Republic Act 8583 in February 1998.

On 16 March 1995, the airline began service with two Airbus A300s, gaining 30% of the market share in Davao, and 23% of the market share in Cebu. The airline also reported load factors around 60%.

After its initial success on the Manila-Cebu/Davao routes, the airline began expanding domestically, introducing service to Cagayan de Oro, Iloilo and Tacloban in May 1996. On 3 April 1996, the airline began thrice-weekly service to Hong Kong, with plans to introduce flights to Seoul by July 1996. Taipei was added to the network on 13 July 1996. The first international commercial flight from the former Clark Air Base was operated on 16 June 1996 by a GrandAir Airbus A300 which flew to Hong Kong.

The Asian Financial Crisis in the late 1990s affected the airline. In July of 1997, two of the airline's three Airbus A300 aircraft at the time were seized in Hong Kong after GrandAir failed to make scheduled payments to the Dutch lessor ING. The airline cited depreciation of the Philippine peso as the reason for the delayed payments, as well as a warranty dispute with the lessor after an engine change on one of the A300s. On 16 February 1998, the airline indefinitely suspended their international operations to Hong Kong and Taipei due to declining passenger volume and increasing operating costs.

In August 1998, the Air Transportation Office suspended the airline's flights, after it was discovered that a pilot was allowed to operate a flight despite being unqualified. A further spot check also discovered that one of the airline's Boeing 737 aircraft did not have a valid certificate of airworthiness.

The airline was forced to fold operation due to mounting debt problem with its Taiwanese creditors.

== Destinations ==
GrandAir flew to the following destinations:

Country	City	Airport	Notes	Refs
British Hong Kong	Hong Kong	Kai Tak Airport		
Philippines	Angeles City	Clark International Airport		
Philippines	Cagayan de Oro	Lumbia Airport		
Philippines	Cebu City	Mactan–Cebu International Airport		
Philippines	Davao City	Francisco Bangoy International Airport		
Philippines	Manila	Ninoy Aquino International Airport	Hub	
Philippines	Subic	Subic Bay International Airport		
Philippines	Tacloban	Daniel Z. Romualdez Airport		
Taiwan	Taipei	Taoyuan International Airport		

== Fleet ==
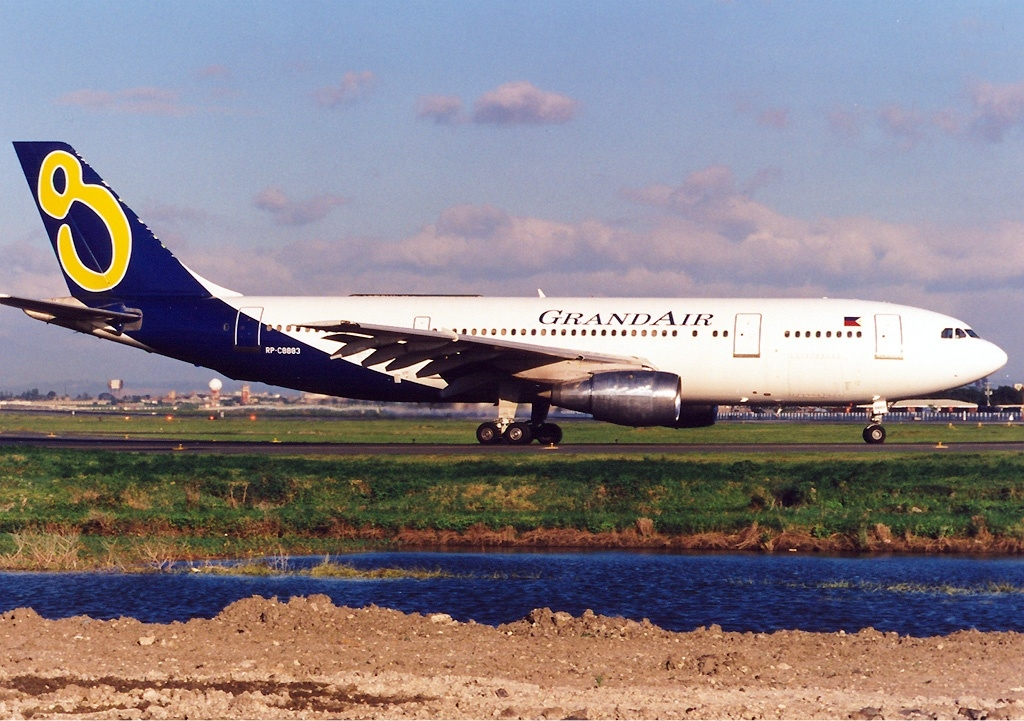
GrandAir Airbus A300

The airline operated a fleet of 5 Airbus A300B4-200 and 4 Boeing 737-200 aircraft. Filipino flight crews operated the Airbus A300s, while the flight crew on the Boeing 737s from the United States and Australia were provided by Asian Aviation Services Ltd.

== Services ==
The airline offered two classes of service, business class (on the Airbus A300) and economy class. In promotional material, the airline positioned itself as an upmarket airline. On flights utilizing Airbus A300 aircraft, a hot full meal service was offered. Catering for the airline was done by GrandAir Caterers Inc. which also served United Airlines, Royal Brunei, Malaysia Airlines and Qatar Airways.

In 1996, the airline inaugurated a business class lounge at the Mactan–Cebu International Airport.
