= Joan Pringle =

American actress (born 1945)

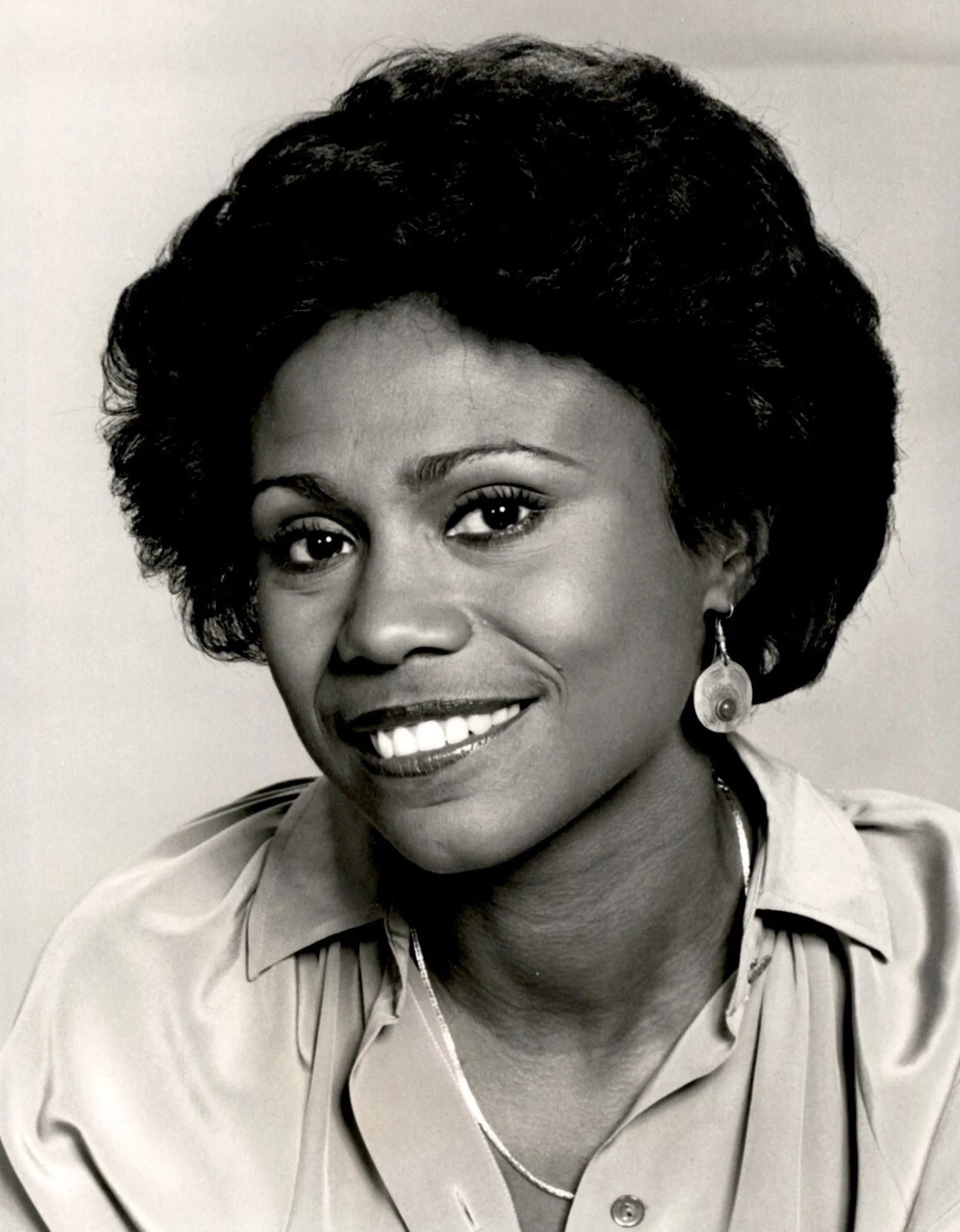
- Pringle in The White Shadow (1979)
- Born: June 2, 1945 (age 81); New York, New York, U.S.
- Occupation: Actress
- Years active: 1963–present
- Spouses: Teddy Wilson (m. 1980; died 1991) Vernon L. Bolling (m. 1998)
- Children: 2

Joan Pringle (born June 2, 1945) is an American actress known for her role as vice principal (and subsequently principal) Sybil Buchanan in the CBS drama series, The White Shadow (1978–1981), for which she received NAACP Image Award for Outstanding Actress in a Drama Series. She later starred in the soap opera, Generations from 1989 to 1991 and had the recurring roles in One on One and Girlfriends.

== Early life ==
Born in New York City, New York's neighborhood of Harlem, Pringle and her sister were raised in Brooklyn. She received her education at an Episcopalian private school, being the only black student in her class. Pringle was a track athlete as a teenager.

After high school, Pringle attended the City College of New York, majoring in English literature and drama. She continued her education at Hunter College for a master's degree in drama, but decided to drop out and begin her acting career. She studied acting under Uta Hagen, and moved to California in 1972.

== Career ==
Pringle's acting career began on the stage. She debuted on Broadway as Rosita in a 1970 production of Camino Real. That same year, Pringle portrayed Edith in the musical Operation Sidewinder by Sam Shepard.

She was under contract as a Universal Studios player in 1973. Pringle made her screen debut that year, appearing as a pregnant woman giving birth to a premature baby in Emergency! Pringle had a recurring role as Diana, the lawyer wife of Mark Sanger on crime drama Ironside. She portrayed Esther, a friend of Erin Walton who is turned down for a job because of her race, in The Waltons.

Pringle was prolific in the 1970s, making appearances on Sanford and Son (1974), Kojak (1974), The Bionic Woman (1977), and Starsky & Hutch (1978). In That's My Mama, she replaced Lynne Moody as Tracy Curtis Taylor for season 2 in 1975. Pringle recurred as nurse Beryl Keynes in Rafferty (1977). She also appeared in a Barnaby Jones episode, “The Deadly Valentine” (03/31/1977). Pringle was Christella in the movie J.D.'s Revenge (1976) along with Glynn Turman and Louis Gossett, Jr.

Starting in 1978, she portrayed Sybil Buchanan, a high school vice principal, in The White Shadow. After actor Ed Bernard left the series, Pringle's character became the new principal. She continued playing Sybil until the series ended in 1981. Pringle stated she struggled finding substantive roles after The White Shadow ended. During the 1980s Pringle guest starred on L.A. Law (1987), Simon & Simon (1988) and Moonlighting (1989).

She starred as Ruth Marshall in the daytime drama Generations from 1989 to 1991 for NBC. Other soap opera roles include General Hospital and The Bold and the Beautiful. Pringle appeared as Gwen Singleton, the boss of Barbara Eden's character, in Visions of Murder (1993) and its sequel Eyes of Terror (1994). Pringle also guest-appeared in a Season 1 episode of Friends as Dr. Oberman in "The One with the Sonogram at the End."

In film, Pringle portrayed housekeeper Sara in Original Sin (2001) and a judge in Tyler Perry's Daddy's Little Girls (2006). On Girlfriends, Pringle had a recurring role as Carol Hart, the mother of Tracee Ellis Ross's character Joan Clayton. Pringle also portrayed Flex Alexander's mother, Eunice, on the sitcom One on One. Following her stint on Girlfriends, Pringle appeared in television series Being Mary Jane (2014) and feature film The Lost City (2022).

== Personal life ==
She was married to actor Theodore "Teddy" Wilson from 1980 until his death in 1991. They had worked together during the second season of the television series That's My Mama, which began in 1974. The couple had two children, twins Robert and Nicole (b. 1980). Pringle married Vernon L. Bolling, a producer, in 1998.

Pringle had been a chain smoker for years before quitting the habit by 1979.
