= Cronies of Ferdinand Marcos =

Some associates of former Philippine president Ferdinand Marcos

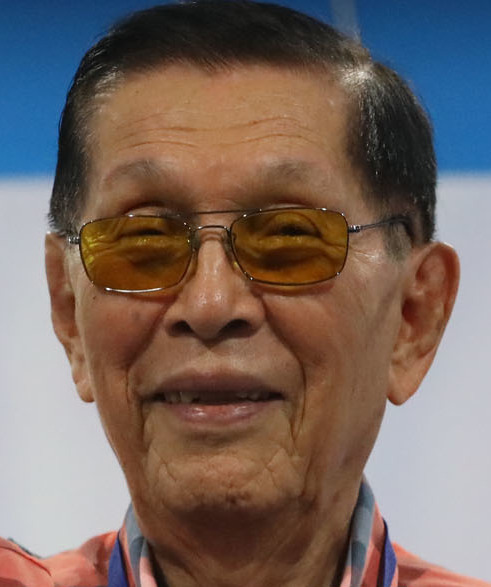
Juan Ponce Enrile

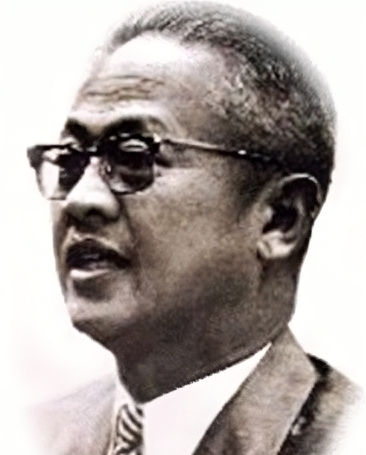
Roberto Benedicto

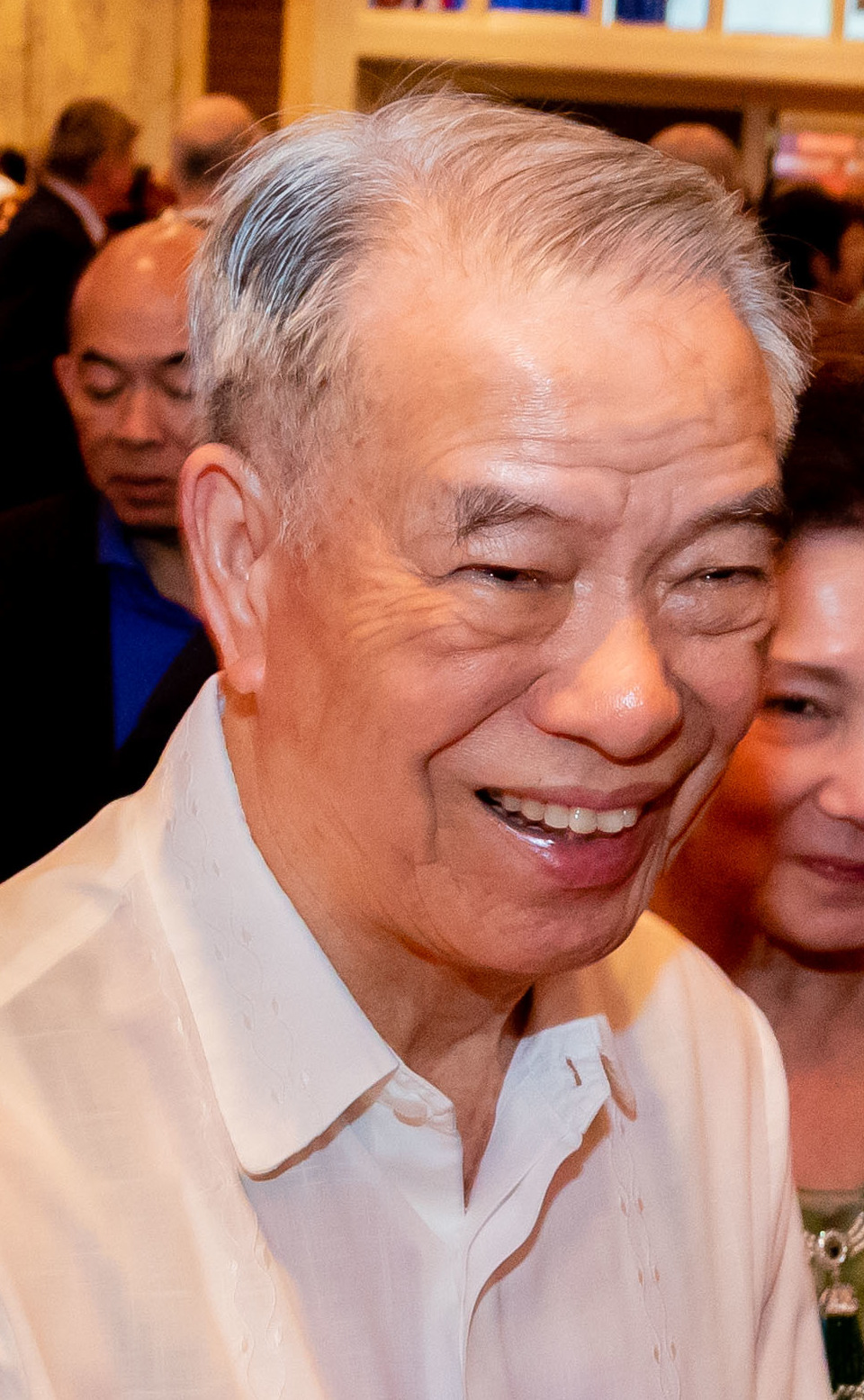
Lucio Tan

Certain associates of former Philippine President Ferdinand Marcos, historically referred to using the catchphrase "Marcos cronies", benefited from their friendship with Marcos – whether in terms of legal assistance, political favors, or facilitation of business monopolies, during his administration. Marcos critics, and the local and international press began referring to these individuals as "cronies" during the latter days of the Marcos dictatorship, and the Philippine government – especially the Presidential Commission on Good Government (PCGG) – continued using the term after the ouster of Marcos in 1986.

These "cronies" were awarded government commissions, projects, and funds, many of which were later investigated for corruption, misuse of funds, and disregard of the Constitution of the Philippines. Marcos' cronies were given strategic positions both in the government and in private sectors in order for the Marcoses to seize control of the major industries of the country.

== Individuals regarded as cronies ==
=== Juan Ponce Enrile ===
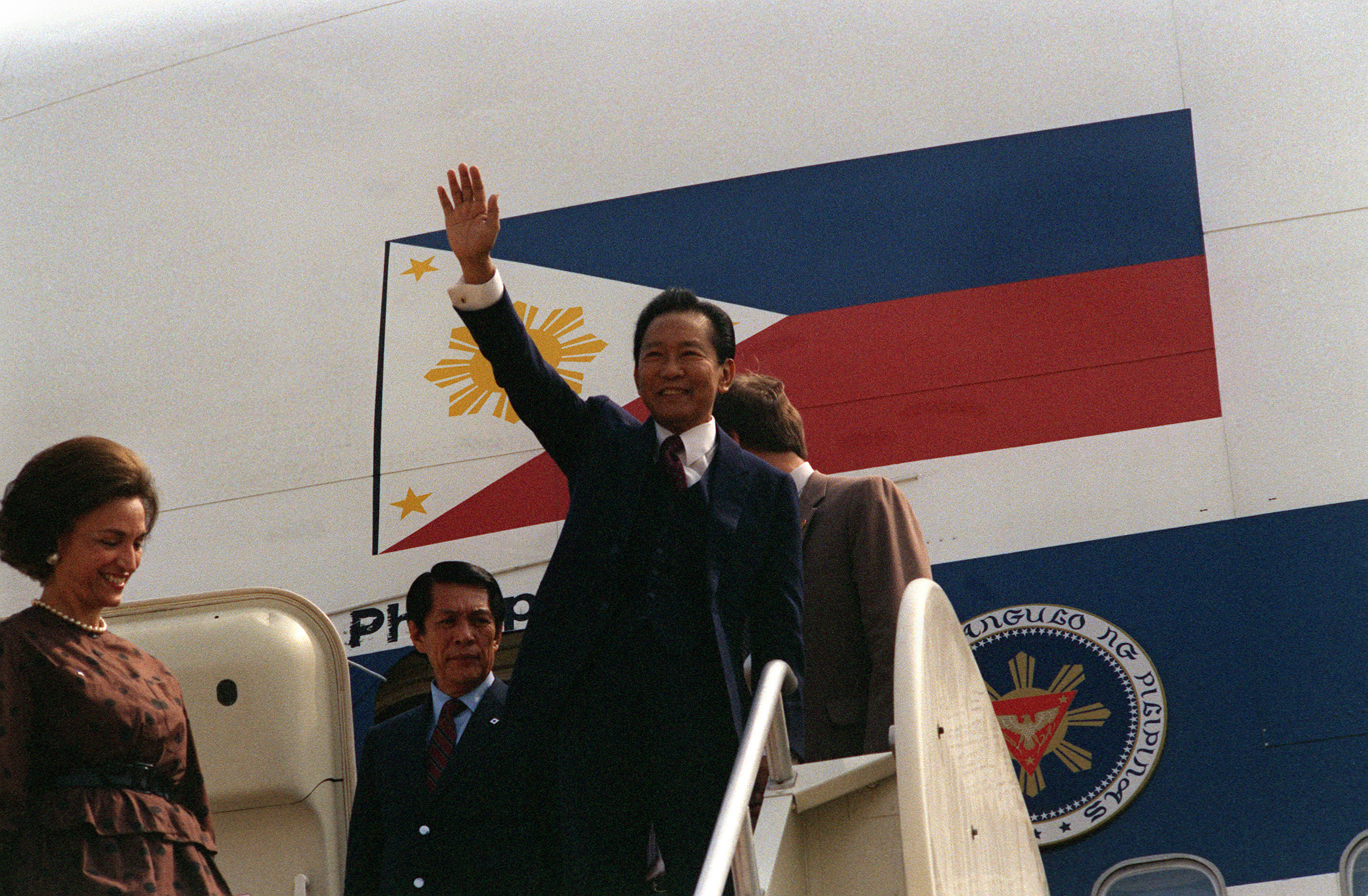
Enrile with President Ferdinand Marcos disembarking from a Philippine Airlines Boeing 747-200 during Marcos' state visit to Washington, D.C., in September 1982.

Enrile served the Marcos Administration under many positions. He was Commissioner of Customs in 1965, and rose to become Defense Minister in 1970. He resigned a year later to run unsuccessfully for the Senate, but was quickly reinstated in 1972. The Marcos administration also fabricated an ambush of Enrile's car, claiming it was perpetrated by militants. This staged act served as justification for the declaration of martial law. Enrile later revealed in a 1985 interview that the attack on his car had been faked. He later turned on Marcos when he, along with then-Vice Chief of Staff of the AFP and Chief of the Philippine Constabulary Lt. Gen. Fidel V. Ramos (future 12th President of the Philippines) and a battalion of soldiers and officers under the Reform the Armed Forces Movement led by Gregorio Honasan, Victor Batac, and Eduardo Kapunan withdraw their support, triggering the 1986 People Power Revolution.

For the majority of the martial law period, Enrile was in charge of all the armed forces, which were responsible for many human rights abuses and summary executions. Enrile was also involved with many cases of corruption, namely:

- involvement in the smuggle of goods during his appointment at the Bureau of Customs, particularly several shiploads of imported rice in La Union.
- with Marcos, gave concessions to politically favored logging companies, such as to Juan Tuvera, the presidential assistant, and a nephew of Isabela governor Faustino Dy, a close Marcos associate. Publicly, Enrile made pronouncements against illegal logging, yet allowed logging concessions to their associates. Alfonso Lim, another close associate of the Marcoses, was allowed seven logging concessions with a total area of 600,000 hectares, a number far from the 100,000-hectare constitutional limit to any one family. Enrile also owns San Jose Lumber, which is a 95,777-hectare logging concession.
- involvement with the Coconut Levy Fund scam, which was originally a tax plan for coconut farmers which will give them opportunities to invest stocks and buy industry-related businesses for their benefit. However, Enrile, with Danding Cojuangco, allegedly used the earnings of the Fund for his own personal and business affairs. Cojuangco allegedly used the levy earnings to purchase San Miguel Corporation, the biggest food and beverage conglomerate in the Philippines. The Philippine Commission on Good Government stated that nearly P9.8 billion was collected from farmers from 1971 to 1983. Current coconut levy assets amount to P93 billion.

=== Antonio Floirendo Sr. ===
Banana magnate Floirendo began his business career in Davao City in the 1940s, when he found it favorable to cultivate relationships with running politicians. He contributed to Marcos' 1965 and 1969 presidential campaign funds, and it was in his Davao estate where Marcos launched his 1969 presidential campaign in southern Philippines.

Under the Marcos administration, Floirendo's company Tagum Agricultural Development Company, Inc. (TADECO) leased 6,000 hectares of prime, fertile, government land and employed prison labor from the neighboring prisons. This project was formerly halted during the Macapagal Administration. It violated the 1935 Constitution of the Philippines and Philippine corporate law, which permitted only up to 1,024 land acquisition. Sen. Lorendo Tañada chaired a Blue Ribbon Committee investigation into the matter, which caused Floirendo to retreat the plan to wait for a more favorable political climate. His plan finally came into fruition after Marcos' second term.

Floirendo also served as a front for the Marcoses in purchasing international properties. With former First Lady Imelda Marcos, he purchased three condominium apartments in Olympic Tower in New York City. He purchased two expensive units at the St. James Towers in Manhattan. He purchased a $1.35 million mansion in Makiki Heights in Hawaii. The mansion, known as the Helen Knudsen estate, sits directly across the Tantoco house where the Marcoses lived in exile. He purchased the $4.5 million Lindenmere estate in Long Island New York, and a $2.5 million Beverly Hills property.

Floirendo escaped the Philippines a day before Ferdinand Marcos was exiled to Hawaii. In 1987, Floirendo turned over PHP 70 million in cash to the Presidential Commission on Good Government, as well as titles for the Lindenmere Estate, the Olympic Towers apartments, and the Makiki Heights Drive property. He admitted transferring amounts of $600,000, $2 million, and $4 million to George Hamilton, an American actor involved in the Marcos' business ties and federal fraud and racketeering cases. They were supposedly loans from Imelda Marcos, who he alleges to have ordered him these transfers. He also admitted that the Marcos-tied corporations of Ancor, Calno, Kuodo and Camelton belonged to him.

=== Eduardo "Danding" Cojuangco Jr. ===
Eduardo "Danding" Cojuangco Jr. kept close, familial ties with the Marcoses. Aside from business and political dealings, Cojuanco and Marcos are godfathers to each other's children — Cojuangco to Marcos' junior, nicknamed Bongbong, and Marcos to Cojuangco's son which he named 'Marcos'.

Cojuangco and Juan Ponce Enrile were involved in the Coco Levy Fund Scam, which taxed small farmers with the promise of shares in the coconut investment company (Cocofund). However, farmers benefitted nothing from this levy, as the middle-men did not return receipts that proved they paid the coconut levy and were entitled to equity in the company.

Due to the sudden surge of the price of coconuts in the world market, this fund became extremely profitable, amounting to as much as $785 million total profits. These funds were channeled to the private financial interests of Marcos and cronies and was consolidated in the United Coconut Planters Bank (UCPB).

With the backing of the Marcos government and the wealth from the levy fund, Cojuangco was able to completely vertically integrate the coconut trade industry by controlling the financing through UCPB and by buying out Unicom, which was the entity in charge of manufacturing and trading of coconut and coconut by-products. Cojuangco's wealth increased rapidly, and by the peak of martial law, the value of all the assets he controlled was $1.5 billion, or 25% of the GNP.

Cojuangco then used the windfalls from the coconut levy fund and United Coconut Planters Bank to finance his purchase of the enormously profitable San Miguel Corporation. The Marcos government gave favors to San Miguel Corporation (SMC). For example, when taxes for liquor and cigarettes were raised in January 1986, excise taxes on beer nevertheless decreased, beer being one of the main products of SMC. The tax cut gave SMC $40 million worth of savings that year.

A 2012 Supreme Court decision ordered the return of ₱71 billion in coconut levy funds to coconut farmers.

=== Roberto Benedicto ===
Roberto Benedicto was Marcos' former classmate and fraternity brother at the UP Law School. When Marcos was president, Benedicto became part of his small circle in Malacañan, one of the few with full access even to private quarters.

Under the Marcos administration, he served as Ambassador to Japan and Chief of the Philippine National Bank, which was the largest state-owned bank at the time. He permitted huge loans for business of other cronies and associates. He used PNB to grant loans for his shipping company, Northern Lines, and his sugar business. His election as Japanese Ambassador allowed him to develop high-level contacts in Japan. Working with President Marcos, they ratified the Treaty of Amity, Commerce and Navigation between Japan and the Philippines, which gave Japan a "most-favored nation" status. This agreement gave Japan undue advantage in using the country's natural resources, which was the primary reason the Philippine Senate did not ratify the treaty for 13 years. Benedicto, understanding the business interests of the Japanese, arranged lucrative joint-venture operations between Japanese corporations and his own. His role as Ambassador also gave him control of the $550 million Japanese war reparations money.

At the prime of his career, Benedicto's empire consisted of 85 corporations, 106 sugar farms, 14 haciendas, other agricultural lands, 17 radio stations, 16 television stations, 2 telecommunications networks, 7 buildings, 10 vessels and 5 aircraft. He also owned 14 hectares of real estate in Bacolod City, 13.5 billion shares in Oriental Petroleum, and membership shares in golf and country clubs estimated at $491,000. Overseas, he owned a sugar mill in Venezuela, a trading company in Madrid, bank deposits, mansions, and limousines in California. Marcos' executive secretary estimated that in 1983, Benedicto's net worth was $800 million.

=== Lucio Tan ===
Lucio Tan styles himself as a rags-to-riches self-made millionaire who worked his way up from sweeping and mopping floors to becoming one of the most influential people in Philippine history. However, a closer inspection at his history will reveal deep connections and cronyism to President Ferdinand Marcos, who was able to launch Tan's immense wealth through sky-high tariff rates on imported cigarettes, under-the-table tax breaks, and government exemptions, all of which allowed Lucio Tan to have a "virtual monopoly for over 40 years in the Philippine Market".

Fortune Tobacco Corp, founded in 1966 (FTC), is the epicenter of Lucio Tan's fortune. While it is unclear how much of the market FTC cornered in 1980, estimates range from 60% to 77%. This outright dominance of the cigarette trade in just 14 short years can be attributed to the massive tariffs on imported cigarettes that Tan enjoyed. The nominal rate of protection for cigarettes was at 182% while the Effective Rate of Protection (ERP) was at a colossal rate of 18,758%. This, coupled with the fact that, according to Manapat, during the Martial Law years Lucio Tan regularly evaded taxes, as much as $50 million per year. In addition to this, Fortune Tobacco Corp lawyers were the brains behind the tax laws concerning cigarettes that allowed Tan to completely dominate the cigarette industry.

Lucio Tan's virtual monopoly on cigarettes afforded him all the advantages in the world, to the detriment of the consumers and buyers and therefore, made the cigarette industry a supplier-driven industry.

=== Geronimo Velasco ===
Velasco was the first chief of the Philippine Ministry of Energy, which was established by Marcos in 1979. The Ministry of Energy sought to remedy the skyrocketing oil and power rates brought by the 1973 global oil crisis, by building power plants from natural energy sources. During his appointment, 20 power plants using hydroelectric, thermal, geothermal energy were completed. A major controversy in his career were the government-imposed levies and taxes on the retail price of gasoline. The gross price of regular gasoline per liter was Php 2.20. After taxes it totaled to Php5.05, making taxes more than 50% of the retail cost.

During the government's corruption probe during the Marcos regime, it was found that Velasco's net worth was estimated to be around $50 million by 1986. He had several million-dollar real estate properties around the world, such as a $1.5 million mansion, a $675,000 condominium both in California, several houses around Metro-Manila, and a reported resort house on the Bataan peninsula only reachable by helicopter or boat. Apart from these properties, Velasco also chaired several government and private corporations, in many petroleum, coal mining, transportation, mineral exploration, and shipping businesses. During the probe, Velasco claimed that he earned his wealth before his appointment under the Marcos administration. However, probers discovered that his net worth was $5.4 million before he joined the government and it ballooned to $50 million, an 825% increase in only 13 years.

=== Roman "Jun" Cruz ===
Cruz served as Undersecretary of Finance from 1968 to 1970, but he is more well known for his bankrolling Imelda Marcos' trips abroad using Philippine Airlines (PAL) funds, which he also managed. Cruz took over PAL after the former owner Benigno Toda was forced out through a Presidential Order in 1977. This was a result of Toda falling out with the Marcoses as the former charged Imelda $6 million for her overseas junkets.

Throughout his chairmanship, the airline was poorly managed and steadily lost money. This was due to First Lady Imelda Marcos' indiscriminate international trips, Cruz's mismanagement, misuse of funds, and his lack of experience. In 1979, PAL lost $33 million, and by 1983, the airline had already lost $63 million. In order to offset the losses, Cruz asked Malacañan for help. The government increased PAL's capitalization from $127 million to $380 million, and $63 million from the National Development Corp. was given to PAL. Despite these additions of government money, PAL continued to suffer loses due to Cruz's mismanagement and lack of experience.

Cruz also served as president and general manager of the Government Service Insurance System (GSIS). GSIS was originally established for financial aid of low-salaried government employees, providing investments, pensions, and housing loans. In 1980, under Cruz's administration, house loans were phased out. Instead, the GSIS funded Marcos-connected companies and Imelda-inspired projects. Of GSIS' total budget of $1.3 billion, 65% or $843 million went into Imelda's lucrative projects, such as luxury hotels made to impress delegates of the IMF-World Bank conference.

Cruz allocated GSIS funds to support Imelda's hotel building plans locally and overseas. There was an allocation of US$202 million to build Kanlaon Towers (in which what would be occupying the site of the former ABS-CBN and RPN headquarters in Roxas Boulevard), Philippine Village Hotel, Philippine Plaza, and Manila Hotel. Cruz also worked with Imelda's brother, Amb. Benjamin Romualdez and organized the Phil-China Friendship Hotels Corp. using GSIS funds in 1980, where the plan was to build two 500-room hotels in Guangzhou and Beijing.

Controversially, Cruz also was accused of using PAL and GSIS funds to acquire real estate in California.

=== Rodolfo Cuenca ===
Cuenca was a college dropout who campaigned and raised funds for Marcos during the 1965 presidential elections and later became Marcos' close friend and golf partner. He later became the head of Construction and Development Corporation of the Philippines (CDCP) which built many of the country's dams, highways, and bridges, including the San Juanico Bridge, which was a major project that connected Leyte and Samar. CDCP also built many lucrative projects at the behest of the first lady Imelda Marcos, such as a land-reclamation project to create a 240-hectare while beach, a huge complex of native-style pavilions, all to impress foreign delegates of international events and conferences. Government probes have found documents that suggested Marcos received millions of dollars in kickbacks in government construction projects from Cuenca's company. CDCP experienced remarkable growth and a sudden collapse. This is due to great amounts of foreign loans, dependence on the government, purchases of heavy equipment even when unnecessary, and high debt to equity ratio. In 1978, CDCP accumulated a staggering $158 million debt, which steadily rose to $650 million by 1980.

=== Manuel Elizalde Jr. ===
Manuel Elizalde was a minister who was also put in charge of protecting ethnic minorities. He was chief of steel companies that were favored through funding and regulations that ensured lucrative markets. He was also given permission to borrow rifle stocks from the Armed Forces of the Philippines, which he sold back to the Philippine Constabulary for a profit. Elizalde left the Philippines in 1983, reportedly with millions of dollars in funds raised for the protection of the Tasadays.

=== Ricardo Silverio ===
Ricardo Silverio Sr. owned more than 50 corporations including Air Manila and Delta Motor Corporation, the assembler and distributor of Toyota automobiles in the country during the 1970s and 1980s. Delta Motor was one of the carmakers that received preferential status and treatment under the government's Progressive Car Manufacturing Program.

He owned two basketball clubs that played in Philippine Basketball Association, Toyota (1975–1983) and Filmanbank (1978–1979).

In 2021, the Sandiganbayan would dismiss the complaint filed by the Presidential Commission on Good Government against the Marcoses, Silverio and businessman Pedro Carlos Jr. for failure to prove allegations against the respondents. The points that were mentioned in the case includes the alleged improper payments of hundreds of thousands of dollars by the two businessmen to the Marcoses in exchange for a contract to supply Kawasaki scrap loaders and Toyota rear dump trucks, grant of three consecutive year special accommodations, privileges, and exemptions from the Central Bank through increased dollar import quota allocation for the importation of Toyota vehicles for Delta Motor and air-conditioning and refrigerating equipments and obtaining a multi-million peso emergency loans as additional capital infusion to Filipinas Bank, a banking institution owned by Silverio.

=== Herminio Disini ===
Herminio Disini was married to Imelda's first cousin, Dr. Paciencia Escolin, who served as her personal physician. He was also known to be one of the golfing buddies of Ferdinand. In 1970, Disini established Philippine Tobacco Filters Corporation (PTFC). While the investment was minimal, Disini's big break came when Marcos issued Presidential Decree 750 on July 21, 1975, where it increased the tariff on raw materials imported by the competitor by a 100%. This forced the competitor out of business.

Disini became infamous for brokering the deal for the Bataan Nuclear Power Plant. The PCGG would later order Disini to return US$50.6 million in commissions he earned from the deal. Marcos allegedly received US$80 million in kickbacks from the project. The Office of the Solicitor General would also file that Marcos return PHP22.2 billion to the government for his conspiracy with Disini to defraud the government.

In 1973, Marcos awarded Disini's Cellophil Resources Corporation a 200,000 hectare logging and paper-pulp concession that was partially responsible for massive deforestation in the Philippines during martial law. Indigenous peoples in the Cordillera region—supported by environmentalists, church organizations, academics, and the Free Legal Assistance Group—organized a protest movement that helped shut down Cellophil after the fall of the Marcos dictatorship in 1986.

The Supreme Court of the Philippines First Division in the August 29, 2023 12-page resolution reduced from P1 billion to P100 million the temperate damages that Herminio T. Disini estate must pay for brokering the 1974 deal behind the now mothballed $2.3-billion Bataan Nuclear Power Plant. “Wherefore, this Court resolves to deny with finality the Republic of the Philippines' Oct. 28, 2021 Motion for Reconsideration. Petitioner Herminio T. Disini's Comment (Re: Motion for Reconsideration) with Omnibus Motion as well as his Supplement to the Comment with Omnibus Motion are noted and partially granted. The award of temperate damages is reduced to P100,000,000. All other aspects of the assailed Decision stand. No further pleadings or motions shall be entertained in this case. Let the entry of judgment be issued immediately", it ruled.

=== Enriquez and Panlilio families ===
Trinidad Diaz Enriquez hails from the province of Leyte, and as such cultivated her relationship with Imelda. The family had humble beginnings with their D&E Restaurant in Quezon City. Winning favor from Imelda and receiving favorable treatment and loans from the government, the family was able to put up Sulo Hotel, Philippine Village Hotel, and Silahis International Hotel. Enriquez's catering business expanded due to the contracts received from Imelda. Enriquez was also able to gain contracts with Philippine Airlines through Roman Cruz.

Trinidad's son-in-law Rebecco Panlilio would later lead the construction of the largest tourism investment in the Philippines at that time, Puerto Azul, at the mouth of Manila Bay in Ternate, Cavite. The said resort expropriated more than 3,000 hectares of land from residents who have been living at the site for generations.

== Suspected role in Marcos' "techniques of plunder" ==
According to Jovito Salonga in his book "Presidential Plunder", which details Salonga's time as head of the Presidential Commission on Good Government, the cronies helped the Marcoses amass their wealth by aiding in one or more of what Salonga called "Marcos' Techniques of Plunder."

These techniques, says Salonga, were:

1. Creating monopolies and putting them under the control of cronies;
2. Awarding loans to cronies from government banking and/or financial institutions;
3. Forced takeovers of various public or private enterprises, with a nominal amount as payment;
4. Direct raiding of the public treasury and government financing institutions;
5. Issuance of Presidential decrees or orders, enabling cronies to amass wealth;
6. Kickbacks and commissions from enterprises doing business in the Philippines;
7. Use of shell corporations and dummy companies to launder money overseas;
8. Skimming of foreign aid and other forms of international assistance; and
9. Hiding wealth in overseas bank accounts using pseudonyms or code names.

== In popular culture ==
- In the film Citizen Jake, the titular character's father, Senator Jacobo Herrera is explicitly referred to as a "Marcos crony" who had to leave the Philippines after the Marcoses were deposed in 1986, but had returned to the Philippines and successfully reestablished himself in Philippine politics.

== See also ==
- Marcos loyalism
- Monopolies in the Philippines (1965–1986)
- Rolex 12
