= Velda Johnston =

American writer (1912–1997)

- Born: May 31, 1912; Prosperity (near Joplin), Missouri
- Died: January 3, 1997 (aged 84); Palm Desert, CA
- Occupation: Novelist
- Writing career
- Pen name: Veronica Jason
- Period: 1968–1991
- Genre: Romantic-suspenseGothic Romance

Velda Johnston (1912–1997) was an American writer of Gothic Romance novels. She also wrote under the pseudonym Veronica Jason. She was raised and educated in Pasadena, California where she sold her first short story as a high school student. She went on to UCLA on a scholarship, where she majored in journalism and wrote articles for the UCLA newspaper.

== Working life ==
In the early 1950s, she and her husband, Robert Heslop, moved to New York. There they divided their time between an apartment in Manhattan and a nineteenth-century farmhouse in Sag Harbor on eastern Long Island that was once the home of Samuel Tribie Hildreth Jr., a whaler turned Argonaut of '49.

Johnston's work, both fiction and non-fiction, appeared in scores of magazines in the United States and abroad over a 40-year period. In her writing, she provides examples of young women who seek happiness and fulfillment in an assertive, independent manner. Her early novels were set in the United States, but her later novels usually had foreign settings.

A Howling in the Woods was made into a television movie in 1971 and starred Barbara Eden and Larry Hagman.

== Bibliography ==
- Along a Dark Path (1968)
- House Above Hollywood (1968)
- A Howling in the Woods (1968)
- I Came to a Castle (also published as Castle Perilous, 1969)
- The Light in the Swamp (1970)
- The Face in the Shadows (1971)
- The People on the Hill (also published as Circle of Evil, 1971)
- The Phantom Cottage (1971)
- The Late Mrs. Fonsell (1972)
- The Mourning Trees (1972)
- Masquerade in Venice (1973)
- The White Pavilion (1973)
- I Came to the Highlands (1974)
- The House on the Left Bank (1975)
- A Room with Dark Mirrors (1975)
- Deveron Hall (1976)
- The Frenchman (1976)
- The Etruscan Smile (1977)
- The Hour Before Midnight (1978)
- Never Call It Love (as Veronica Jason, 1978)
- The People from the Sea (1979)
- The Silver Dolphin (1979)
- A Presence in an Empty Room (1980)
- The Stone Maiden (1980)
- The Fateful Summer (1981)
- So Wild a Heart (as Veronica Jason, 1981)
- Wild Winds of Love (as Veronica Jason, 1982)
- The Other Karen (1983)
- Voice in the Night (1984)
- The Crystal Cat (1985)
- Shadow Behind the Curtain (1985)
- Fatal Affair (1986)
- The Girl on the Beach (1987)
- The House on Bostwick Square (1987)
- The Man at Windmere (1988)
- Flight to Yesterday (1990)
- The Underground Stream (1991)
