= Anita Finlay =

American actress

- Education: Hunter College High School; Queens College (BA)
- Occupations: actress, author
- Known for: The Young and the Restless

Anita Finlay is an American film and television actress who played the recurring role of Dr. Nora Thompson on The Young and the Restless for seven years. Born, raised and trained as an actress in New York, Finlay's television credits include guest appearances on Grey's Anatomy, Perception, Castle, Brothers and Sisters, 24, Gilmore Girls, Judging Amy, The Guardian, Melrose Place, Matlock, L.A. Law and Hannah Montana. Finlay starred in a number of feature films and made-for-television movies including "Alternate Endings", "The Last Place on Earth", "Two Voices", "Prison of Secrets" and Visions of Murder. In addition, Finlay has done scores of commercial campaigns and worked in the theatre as a solo artist, writing and performing "The Devil Takes a Wife" to acclaim in Los Angeles theaters. She has also performed in regional theatres throughout the United States and had long running spokesperson contracts for a number of Fortune 500 companies.

Finlay is the author of Dirty Words on Clean Skin: Sexism and Sabotage, a Hillary Supporter's Rude Awakening published in March 2012. Dirty Words on Clean Skin was a #1 bestseller on Amazon's Women in Politics books for 16 weeks and is part of the Clinton Presidential Library.

In March 2015, Finlay became the co-host of Dare We Say, a nationally syndicated web-talk series. Finlay is also a commentator for The Jerry Doyle Show, America's Radio News Network, and Newsmax/Midpoint with Ed Berliner and a principal contributor at EPIC TIMES. Her articles have been featured on Real Clear Politics, MemeOrandum, MediaBistro/DC Fishbowl, xoJane, and Knoxville Journal. She was chosen as a 2014 BlogHer Voice of the Year, where her work is repeatedly Editors' Choice.

Speaking primarily on women's empowerment, Finaly is a media critic and commentator on many other syndicated radio and TV programs around the country. Finlay has also spoken before such groups as MENSA, NAPW, VFA, the Women's Leadership Forum, NOW and colleges such as USC, UCLA and Pasadena City College, where her book Dirty Words on Clean Skin is part of the curriculum. Finlay also taught seminars on Marketing Yourself As An Actor: Presentation, Personality and Performance at UCLA Extension, In The Act, UC San Diego as well as guest lecturing at various acting schools and studios in Los Angeles.

Finlay started Queens College at age 16, after attending Hunter College High School. She took a leave of absence from Queens College after her second year in order to work in a law firm. After a one-year sabbatical she went back and completed her B.A., graduating Magna Cum Laude.

A supporter of Hillary Clinton's presidential campaign in 2008, Finlay blogged extensively for Larry Johnson's No Quarter blog and Uppity Woman. Her work has been featured on Real Clear Politics, Memeorandum and several other widely read political blogs. She is currently on the writing staff of The New Agenda, a bi-partisan organization dedicated to improving the lives of women and girls.

== Filmography ==
Year	Film	Role	Other notes
2013	Grey's Anatomy	Marion Strong	TV series
2012	Naughty or Nice	Mrs. Harris	Feature Film
2012	Perception	Martha Baker	TV series
2011	Brothers & Sisters	Judge Marsha Forrest	TV series Oliva's Choice Award
2010	Reformed Tramp	Brenda	Short
2009	Castle	Margo Falcigno	TV series
2008	Hannah Montana	Jeanette Harris	TV series
2008	Days of Our Lives	Dr. Janet Elman / Dr. Whitney	TV series
2008	Alternate Endings	Susan	Short
2007	Girlfriends	Charlotte McDonald	TV series
2006	Vanished	Joan McInerney	TV series
1999–2006	The Young and the Restless	Dr. Nora Thompson	TV series
2006	Pepper Davis	Liezel	TV series
2006	24	Wendy Brown	TV series
2004	Boston Legal	Helen Poole	TV series
2004	The Division	Dallas Kazlowski	TV series
2003	A. USA	Elizabeth 'Taffy' McCarthy	TV series
2003	Aftermath	Female Therapist	TV movie
2002	The Guardian	Marilyn Thomas	TV series
2002	Gilmore Girls	Marie Springsteen	TV series
2002	Six Feet Under	Female Coke User	TV series
2002	For Your Love	Linda Linley	TV series
2002	The Last Place on Earth	Kelly Baskin	
2001	Judging Amy	Caroline Bishop	TV series
2000	Talk to Taka	Second Woman with Relationship Problems	short
1999	Melrose Place	Social Worker	TV series
