= Visions of Murder =

1993 American television film

- Genre: Thriller
- Written by: Julie Moskowitz; Gary Stephens
- Directed by: Michael Rhodes
- Starring: Barbara Eden; James Brolin; Joan Pringle; Scott Bryce; Erika Flores; Terry O'Quinn
- Music by: Michael Hoenig
- Country of origin: United States
- Original language: English

Production
- Executive producers: Freyda Rothstein; Gene Schwam
- Producers: Dennis Stuart Murphy; Angela Bromstad
- Cinematography: Steven Shaw
- Editor: David Handman
- Running time: 86 minutes
- Production companies: Bar-Gene Productions; Freyda Rothstein Productions; Hearst Entertainment

Original release
- Network: NBC
- Release: May 7, 1993

Related
- Eyes of Terror

Visions of Murder is a 1993 American made-for-television psychological thriller film directed by Michael Rhodes and starring Barbara Eden and James Brolin. The film was based on a teleplay written by Julie Moskowitz and Gary Stephens and was shot on location in San Francisco, California and San Jose, California. It premiered as a presentation of NBC Friday Night at the Movies on May 7, 1993.

The film was followed by a 1994 sequel, Eyes of Terror, also starring Barbara Eden.

== Plot summary ==
Dr. Jesse Newman (Barbara Eden) is a San Francisco psychologist caught in a terrifying web of suspicion and intrigue when one of her patients is found murdered and suddenly begins to experience paranormal visions. Frightened and confused by her premonitions, Jesse recognizes a missing woman on the news but is still unsure of her newly developed abilities. Believing that she has witnessed a murder, she attempts to convince a skeptical police department. Dangerously entangled in these mysterious events, Jesse becomes the prime suspect and, possibly, the next victim.

== Cast ==
- Barbara Eden as Dr. Jesse Newman
- James Brolin as Hal (Jesse's ex-husband)
- Joan Pringle as Gwen
- Scott Bryce as Lt. Sayles
- Erika Flores as Kimberly
- Anita Finlay as Gloria
- Terry O'Quinn as Admiral Truman Hager
- Jason Keogh as The Bartender

== Home media ==
Visions of Murder was released twice on Region 1 DVD on December 23, 2003 by Madacy Entertainment and July 6, 2010 by Echo Bridge Entertainment. Release parties were held for both DVD releases in Campbell, California at the bar featured in the production.
