= Eyes of Terror =

1994 American television film

- Also known as: Visions of Terror; Visions of Murder II
- Genre: Thriller
- Written by: Duane Poole
- Directed by: Sam Pillsbury
- Starring: Barbara Eden; Michael Nouri; Ted Marcoux; Missy Crider; Joan Pringle; Steve Anthony Jones; David Marciano
- Music by: Michael Hoenig
- Country of origin: United States
- Original language: English

Production
- Executive producers: Freyda Rothstein; Gene Schwam
- Producers: James R. McGee; Angela Bromstad
- Production location: San Jose, California
- Cinematography: Daryn Okada
- Editor: Pam Malouf-Cundy
- Running time: 92 minutes
- Production companies: Bar-Gene Productions; Freyda Rothstein Productions; Hearst Entertainment

Original release
- Network: NBC
- Release: March 18, 1994

Related
- Visions of Murder

Eyes of Terror (also known as Visions of Murder II and Visions of Terror) is a 1994 American thriller television film and a sequel to Visions of Murder (1993) starring Barbara Eden reprising her role as psychic psychologist Dr. Jesse Newman.

Directed by Sam Pillsbury and written by Duane Poole, Eyes of Terror was shot on location in San Jose, California and premiered on NBC as part of their Friday Night Mystery series, on March 18, 1994.

== Synopsis ==
The story follows Dr. Jesse Newman, a counsellor for members of the San Francisco Police Department. He is assigned to treating David Zaccariah, a grieving policeman who lost his partner of ten years in a shootout. Days later, it seems that the case is wrapped up when the perfect suspect is apprehended. But David has inadvertently given the most important clue of all to the person he should have most avoided: Jesse Newman. It's a lucky coin that belonged to his partner, and it triggers a revealing series of psychic visions for Jesse. The visions implicate much more than just the killer; they reveal the sordid habits of San Francisco's business and political elite.

== Cast ==
- Barbara Eden as Dr. Jesse Newman
- Michael Nouri as Lt. David Zaccariah
- Ted Marcoux as Det. Tony Carpelli
- Missy Crider as Kimberly
- Joan Pringle as Gwen Singleton
- Steven Anthony Jones as Capt. Jim Armstrong
- David Marciano as Kenneth Burch
- Ed Trucco

== Home media ==
The film was released twice on Region 1 DVD under the title Visions of Terror on November 16, 2006 by Sterling Home Entertainment and March 27, 2012 by Fisher Klingenstein Films.
