= The Secret Life of Kathy McCormick =

1988 television film by Robert Lewis

- Genre: Romance; Comedy
- Written by: Jim Brecher
- Story by: Gloria Goldsmith
- Directed by: Robert Lewis
- Starring: Barbara Eden; Josh Taylor; Jenny O'Hara; Dick O'Neill
- Music by: Mark Snow
- Country of origin: United States
- Original language: English

Production
- Executive producers: Tamara Asseyev; Barry Weitz
- Producers: Barbara Eden; Gloria Goldsmith
- Cinematography: Eric Van Haren Noman
- Editor: Les Green
- Running time: 100 minutes
- Production companies: Tamara Asseyev Productions; New World Television

Original release
- Network: NBC
- Release: October 7, 1988

The Secret Life of Kathy McCormick is a 1988 American made-for-television romantic comedy film starring Barbara Eden, Josh Taylor, Judy Geeson, Jenny O'Hara and Dick O'Neill. It was broadcast on NBC on October 7, 1988.

The film's tagline in newspaper and magazine ads was: A modern-day Cinderella has an absolute ball with high society!

== Plot summary ==
A modern-day Cinderella tale about a grocery-store cashier named Kathy McCormick (Barbara Eden) who becomes a member of local high society through a series of misunderstandings and when she tells her society peers she works at The Market, they believe she's talking about the stock market. While attending a charity luncheon, she meets and falls in love with Grant Sherwood (Josh Taylor), a wealthy playboy who is unaware of her true identity.

== Cast ==
- Barbara Eden as Kathy McCormick
- Josh Taylor as Grant Sherwood
- Judith-Marie Bergan as Janice
- Judy Geeson as Babs
- Jenny O'Hara as Lisa
- Robert Costanzo as Sid
- Jennifer Savidge as Marsha
- Dick O'Neill as Ray

== Home media ==
The Secret Life of Kathy McCormick was released on VHS on December 10, 1993.
