= Philippine Village Hotel =

Hotel in Pasay, Philippines

- Former names: Mercure Philippine Village Hotel
- Hotel chain: Mercure

General information
- Status: Demolished
- Type: Hotel
- Architectural style: Brutalist
- Location: Nayong Pilipino Park, Pasay, Metro Manila, Philippines
- Coordinates: 14°30′42″N 121°00′40″E
- Opening: 1974
- Closed: May 2001; 25 years ago
- Demolished: September 2025: 1 year ago
- Owner: Manila International Airport Authority

Technical details
- Floor count: 14
- Floor area: 36,289 square meters
- Lifts/elevators: 4

Design and construction
- Architect: Juan Nakpil
- Known for: First airport hotel in the Philippines

Other information
- Number of rooms: 332
- Number of suites: 20
- Number of restaurants: 2
- Number of bars: 2

Philippine Village Hotel (colloquially PVH) was an abandoned hotel located within the Nayong Pilipino Complex, next door to Ninoy Aquino International Airport, in Pasay City, Metro Manila, Philippines. Designed by National Artist Juan Nakpil, it was hailed as the first airport hotel in the Philippines.

The hotel, now owned by the Government Service Insurance System (GSIS), used to be in the hands of Pampanga-based Enriquez-Panlilio family, who are involved in the real estate and shipping industry (and are also the same owners of the Silahis International Hotel).

== History ==
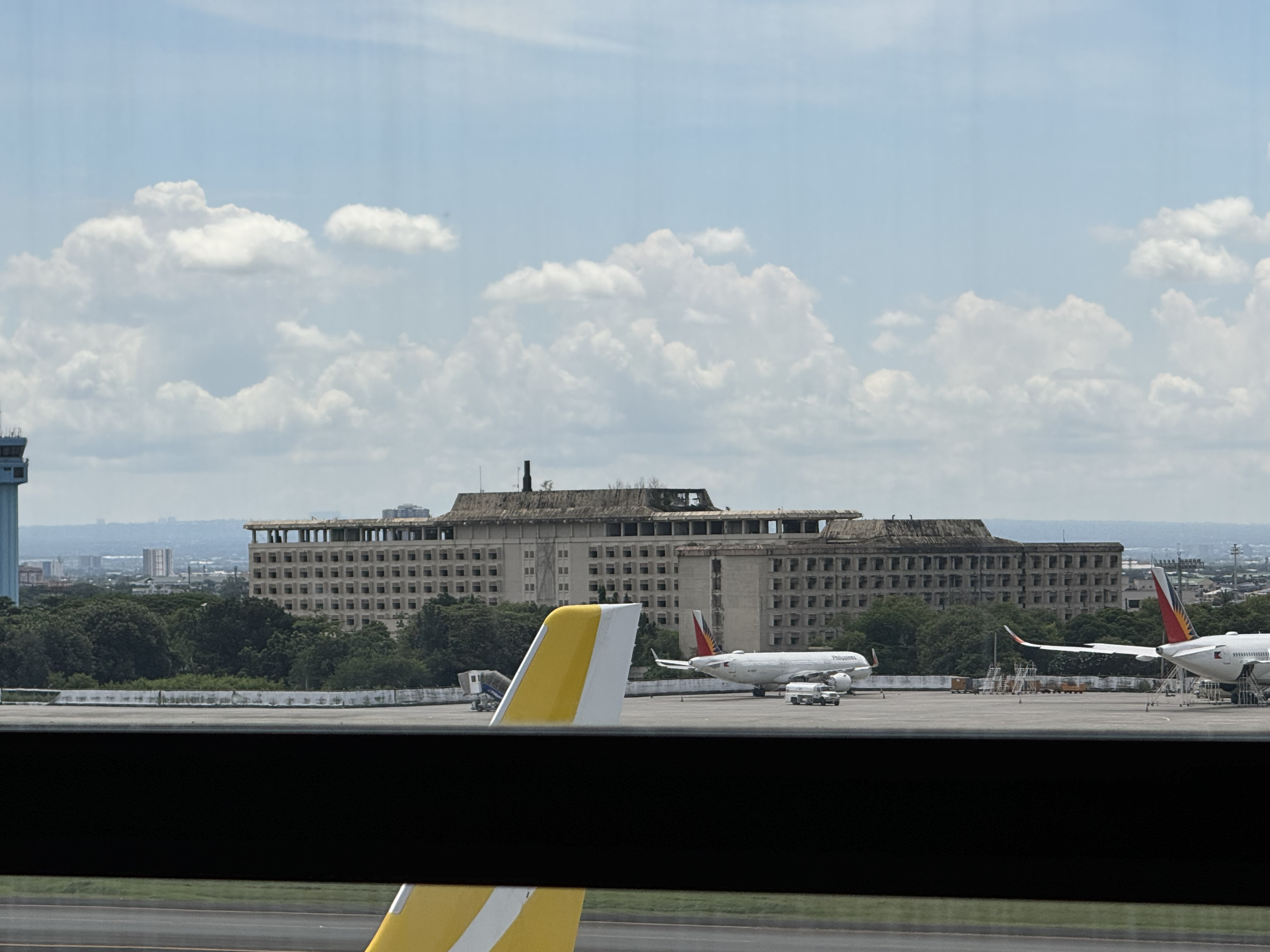
A shot of the abandoned PVH hotel in 2024.

A construction boom of hotels initiated and streamlined by the then-incumbent Philippine president Ferdinand Marcos took place in the 1970s in anticipation for the then-upcoming hosting of the 1976 International Monetary Fund and the World Bank Summits in the Philippines. The Philippine Village Hotel was among those hotels and was built on a land owned by the Nayong Pilipino Foundation.

The hotel was built in 1974 by Philippine Village Hotel Inc (PVHI), leasing the Nayong Pilipino land for 21 years.

The hotel hosted foreign business travelers, leisure travelers, nightclub partygoers, and socialites. First Lady Imelda Marcos frequently hosted events in the hotel. The hotel also housed the country's first land-based casino after the shutdown of MS Philippine Tourist.

=== Miss Universe ===
Delegates of Miss Universe 1974 were housed in the Philippine Village Hotel. One of the suites of the hotel was occupied by winner Amparo Muñoz, leading it to be named the "Miss Universe suite".

=== Grand Air Terminal ===
The hotel also operated as a terminal for another airline in the Philippines, Grand Air, from 1995 until 1999, when the airline ceased operations.

=== Management ===
From the 1990s, Mercure Hotels was responsible for managing the hotel.

=== Closure ===
Philippine Village Hotel ceased operations in May 2001. A year later, the next-door Nayong Pilipino park was closed to make way for the expansion of the airport complex.

=== Demolition ===
After a year, the New NAIA Infrastructure Corporation took over Ninoy Aquino International Airport, on April 10, 2025, it was announced that the long abandoned hotel would start demolition process starting April 21, to make way for NAIA Terminal 5. As of January 2026, the hotel has been demolished.

== Sequestration by the Philippine Government ==
Due to non-payment of taxes, the government sequestered the property in 2023. The hotel was also deemed a threat to the airport's security as it was feared to be a potential base of operations for terrorism. Concerns were raised that the hotel could threaten daily operations of NAIA Terminal 2 and the 250th Presidential Airlift Wing. According to then-Transportation Secretary Jaime Bautista, clearance would be needed from the National Historical Commission due to the "50-year cutoff that automatically classifies it as a heritage site".

Between November and December 2023, the Philippine Government took full control of the hotel and plans to demolish it for the expansion of the airport, which was initiated on April 21, 2025 and was completely demolished as of January 2026.

In April 2025, it was reported that NAIA Terminal 5 will be constructed over land that used to be under the hotel.
