= The Stranger Within (1974 film) =

- Genre: Horror; science fiction; mystery
- Based on: Trespass by Richard Matheson
- Written by: Richard Matheson
- Directed by: Lee Philips
- Starring: Barbara Eden; George Grizzard; Joyce Van Patten; David Doyle; Nehemiah Persoff
- Theme music composer: Charles Fox
- Country of origin: United States
- Original language: English

Production
- Executive producers: Philip Capice; Lee Rich
- Producer: Neil T. Maffeo
- Production locations: The Burbank Studios, Burbank, California; Bronson Canyon, Griffith Park - 4730 Crystal Springs Drive, Los Angeles, California
- Cinematography: Michael D. Margulies
- Editor: Samuel E. Beetley
- Running time: 74 minutes
- Production company: Lorimar Productions

Original release
- Network: ABC
- Release: October 1, 1974

The Stranger Within is a 1974 American made-for-television science fiction horror film directed by Lee Phillips and starring Barbara Eden and George Grizzard. Written by Richard Matheson, and based on his 1953 novelette Trespass, it capitalized on Rosemary's Baby, but included a science-fiction twist.

The film premiered as the ABC Movie of the Week on October 1, 1974.

== Plot ==
Ann Collins, a painter, and her husband David are expecting a baby. What confuses the couple is that David has had a vasectomy, and Ann is not supposed to be pregnant. Even though David suspects that Ann has been unfaithful to him, he stays with her. Because Ann had pregnancy troubles in the past that put her health at risk, David wants Ann to get an abortion, but every time the two try to go to get the procedure done, Ann experiences extreme labor pains and is unable to go through with the procedure.

Throughout the course of her pregnancy, Ann has strange cravings for black coffee, raw meat and massive amounts of salt. She also exhibits personality and physical changes, including wanting to read books constantly, enduring freezing temperatures, developing acutely sensitive hearing, taking long and strenuous walks in the mountains, an inability to listen to other people, and healing her injuries within minutes.

David wants Bob, a hypnotist, to see if he can obtain any information about why Ann is acting so strangely. Ann does not say a word, even when she is hypnotized. One day when Ann comes home from one of her walks in the mountains, she finds David, Bob, and Ann's friend Phyllis waiting for her. She quickly drinks boiling hot coffee to catch her breath, and David notices that the coffee makes her drunk. Bob tries hypnotizing Ann again, and an extraterrestrial being starts speaking through her. The being says that his father banished him to this warm planet (Earth) and that he wants to go back to his home where it is "cool". He says that Ann was impregnated by a spaceship’s beam while she was painting in the mountains. After the alien stops talking through Ann, she finally falls asleep.

During the night, Ann sneaks out to an abandoned house in the woods, where she gives birth. She walks into the woods, where many other women are also walking with their alien babies. David looks at one of Ann's paintings, depicting the alien being's home planet. The painting starts to smoke. David looks out the window and screams Ann's name, as he watches a spacecraft take Ann to the alien's home planet.

== Cast ==
- Barbara Eden as Ann Collins
- George Grizzard as David Collins
- David Doyle as Bob
- Joyce Van Patten as Phyllis
- Nehemiah Persoff as Dr. Edward Klein

== Home media ==
The Stranger Within was released on Region 1 DVD on October 6, 2009 from the online Warner Archive Collection. In November 2026, Iconoscope released a limited edition Blu-ray with newly-commissioned bonus features, initially made available for sale via Vinegar Syndrome's online store.

== Sources ==
- Derry, Charles (2009). Dark Dreams 2.0: A Psychological History of the Modern Horror Film from the 1950s to the 21st Century. Jefferson, North Carolina: McFarland & Company. ISBN 978-0-7864-5695-6.
- Meehan, Paul (2023). Alien Abduction in the Cinema. Jefferson, North Carolina: McFarland & Company. ISBN 978-1-476-68827-5.
