= A Howling in the Woods =

- Poster artwork
- Genre: Horror; Thriller
- Based on: A Howling in the Woods by Velda Johnston
- Written by: Richard DeRoy
- Directed by: Daniel Petrie
- Starring: Barbara Eden; Larry Hagman; John Rubinstein; Vera Miles
- Music by: Dave Grusin
- Country of origin: United States
- Original language: English

Production
- Producer: Douglas Benton
- Cinematography: Jack Marta
- Editor: Robert F. Shugrue
- Running time: 100 minutes
- Production company: Universal Television

Original release
- Network: NBC
- Release: November 5, 1971

A Howling in the Woods is a 1971 American made-for-television horror thriller film directed by Daniel Petrie and starring Barbara Eden, Larry Hagman, John Rubinstein, and Vera Miles. The teleplay was written by Richard DeRoy based on the 1968 novel by Velda Johnston. Its plot follows a housewife vacationing in the woods who experiences mysterious howling noises in the night. The film premiered on NBC as the NBC World Premiere Movie on November 5, 1971. It was released theatrically in Europe.

Produced by Universal Television, the film was shot on location in Lake Tahoe and nearby Dayton, Nevada. A Howling in the Woods also reunited Barbara Eden and Larry Hagman shortly after their TV series I Dream of Jeannie was cancelled.

== Summary ==
Liza Crocker (Barbara Eden) is a disillusioned housewife with plans to divorce her husband Eddie (Larry Hagman). She returns to her family home in a small Nevada town to visit her step-mother (Vera Miles) and discovers she has a new step-brother (John Rubinstein), her father seemingly missing, mysterious behavior by the townsfolk and a mysterious howling in the woods at night. She soon finds out that the howling is from an abandoned dog. She also finds out that her new step-brother is actually her step-mother's lover. As her father caught them on bed, they killed him to silence him.

== Cast ==
- Barbara Eden as Liza Crocker
- Larry Hagman as Eddie Crocker
- John Rubinstein as Justin Conway
- Vera Miles as Rose Staines
- Tyne Daly as Sally Bixton
- Ruta Lee as Sharon
- George Murdock as Mel Warren
- Ford Rainey as Bud Henshaw
- Lisa Gerritsen as Betsy Warren
- Bill Vint as Lonnie Henshaw
- Karl Swenson as Apperson
