= The Feminist and the Fuzz =

- Genre: Comedy
- Written by: James Henerson
- Directed by: Jerry Paris
- Starring: Barbara Eden; David Hartman; Jo Anne Worley; Herb Edelman; Julie Newmar
- Music by: Jack Elliott; Allyn Ferguson
- Country of origin: United States
- Original language: English

Production
- Producer: Claudio Guzmán
- Cinematography: Emil Oster
- Editor: Bud Molin
- Running time: 74 minutes
- Production company: Screen Gems

Original release
- Network: ABC
- Release: January 26, 1971

The Feminist and the Fuzz is a 1971 American TV movie starring Barbara Eden, David Hartman, Jo Anne Worley, Herb Edelman and Julie Newmar. It premiered as the ABC Movie of the Week on January 26, 1971. The film was directed by Jerry Paris.

== Plot ==
Pediatrician Jane Bowers is a women's lib advocate who meets Officer Jerry Frazer when they both show up to view an apartment in San Francisco. They immediately butt heads as her militant demand for equal treatment conflicts with his traditional "ladies first" attitude. Due to the shortage of affordable housing and a misunderstanding with the landlord, they agree to pose as a married couple to share the apartment since their work schedules don't overlap, an arrangement she openly shares with Wyatt, her understanding, liberal lawyer fiancé and Mother's boy, but not with her father. Jerry keeps the secret from his girlfriend, Kitty, a Bunny at the Playboy Club.

Fellow doctor and ultra-militant women's libber Debby organizes a disruptive swimsuit protest at the club, to which the police respond, including Jerry. He sees a bikini-clad Jane participating at the protest and sends her home in a taxicab instead of arresting her, infuriating her. An upset Jane calls her father to talk, which makes him concerned enough to drive into town. Prostitute and aspiring porn actress Lilah asks Jerry to arrest her so she has someplace to sleep. Kindhearted Jerry lets her stay in the apartment overnight while he's at work, but finds a note from Jane that she will be leaving because of his "sexual bigotry." Jane's father arrives and is let in by the landlord. He runs into Lilah and assumes she's Jane's roommate. The truth comes out when Jerry rushes home after finding out Jane has left work early. Kitty arrives and recognizes Jane from the protest. Wyatt and Debby also arrive. Jerry professes his love for Jane, who runs out in confusion as Kitty angrily disavows Jerry and asks to join Debby's organization, WAM (Women Against Men). Wyatt's masochistic desire to be dominated by women is confirmed as he finds Debby's pushiness attractive. Jerry chases after Jane and catches her in the middle of the intersection, where they embrace and kiss while causing traffic to back up.

== Cast ==
- Barbara Eden as Dr. Jane Bowers
- David Hartman as Officer Jerry Frazer
- Jo Anne Worley as Dr. Debby Inglefinger
- Herb Edelman as Wyatt Foley
- Julie Newmar as Lilah McGuinness
- John McGiver as Lawrence Sorensen
- Farrah Fawcett as Kitty Murdock
- Harry Morgan as Dr. Horace Bowers
- Roger Perry as Dr. Howard Lassiter
- Arthur Batanides as Joe
