= Opposites Attract (film) =

1990 television film

- Genre: Romance; Comedy
- Written by: Susan Rice
- Directed by: Noel Nosseck
- Starring: Barbara Eden; John Forsythe; Ilene Graff; Conchata Ferrell; Rebeca Arthur
- Music by: Mark Snow
- Country of origin: United States
- Original language: English

Production
- Executive producers: Frank von Zerneck; Robert M. Sertner
- Producer: Susan Weber-Gold
- Cinematography: Robert Elswit
- Editor: Barrett Taylor
- Running time: 95 minutes
- Production companies: Bar-Gene Productions; Rastar Productions

Original release
- Network: NBC
- Release: October 17, 1990

Opposites Attract (working title Running Mates) is a 1990 American made-for-television romantic comedy film starring Barbara Eden and John Forsythe. It originally aired as the NBC Wednesday Night Movie on NBC on October 17, 1990.

== Synopsis ==
A former cowboy movie star Rex Roper (John Forsythe) decides to run for Mayor of Crescent Bay, California. He hopes that if he wins the election, he will be able to install his hot tub, a plan that Town Supervisor Charlene McKeon (Barbara Eden) had previously nixed due to the area's water shortage.

Charlene is also running for Mayor, pitting her solid reputation, vigilant community membership and homespun values against Rex's popularity, megabucks and media savvy. Before the election, Rex and Charlene have created their own political scandal when the two opponents find themselves falling in love.

== Cast ==
- Barbara Eden as Charlene "Charlie" McKeon
- John Forsythe as Rex Roper
- Ilene Graff as Frannie
- Conchata Ferrell as Flo
- Rebeca Arthur as Victoria
- Danielle von Zerneck as Sky
- Charles Levin as Marcino

== Home media ==
Opposites Attract was released on Region 1 DVD on September 26, 2006 by Direct Source Label.
