= Nite Club Confidential =

Nite Club Confidential is a musical that debuted Off-Broadway in 1984. The show, which was written and directed by Dennis Deal, was about 1950s-era nightclubs and starred Fay DeWitt, a former nightclub performer.

== Productions ==
Nite Club Confidential was subsequently staged in other cities. Actor Scott Bakula appeared in the Los Angeles and Boston productions.

In 1988 it was produced in London's West End, playing at the Playhouse,

== Reception ==
The 1984 off-broadway production received criticism for its casting and book.

The 1986 Los Angeles production received praise for its casting.

The 1988 West End production was panned by critics, which led to its early demise.
