= Barbara Eden =

American actress and singer (born 1931)

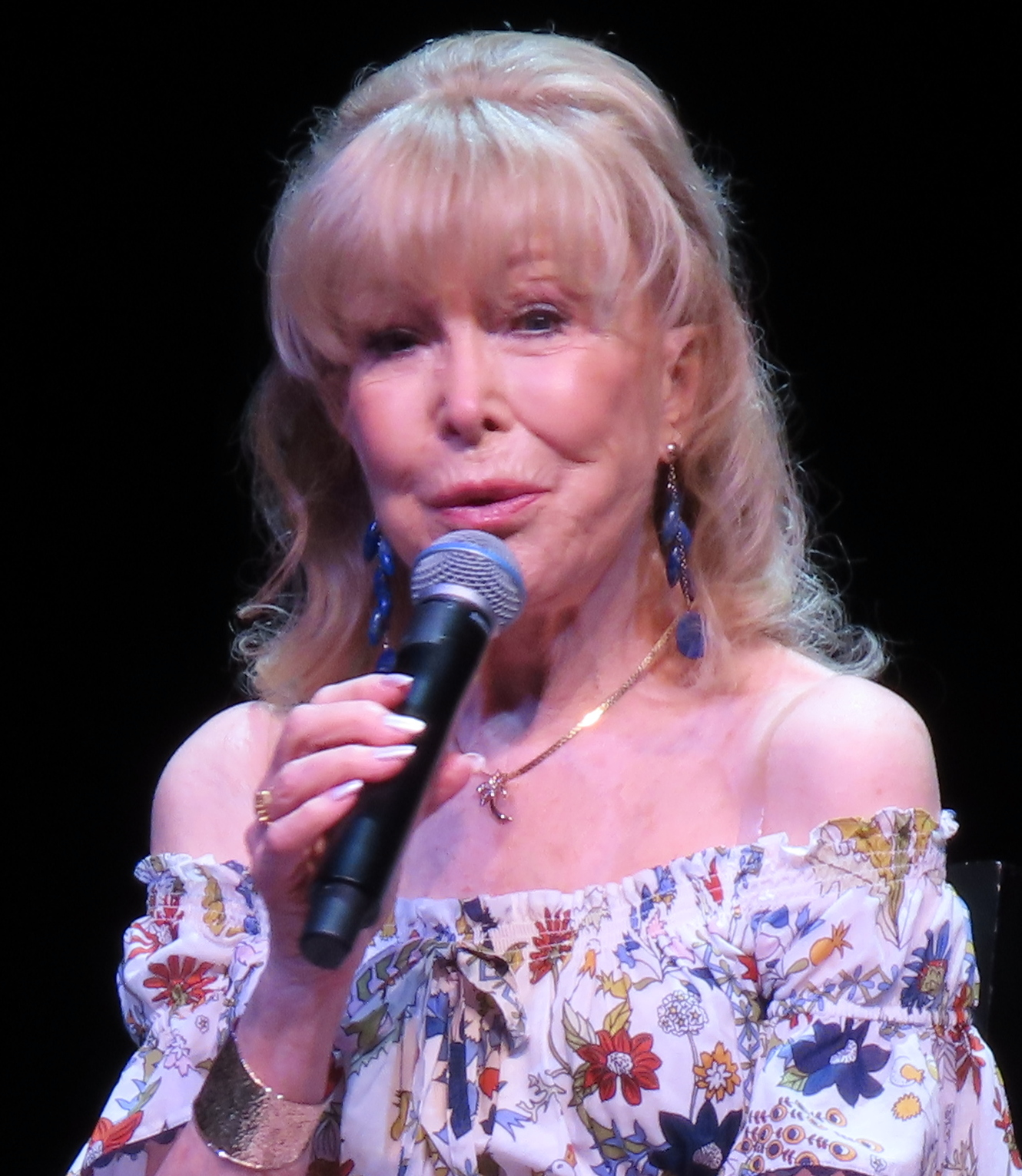
- Eden at a convention in 2022
- Born: Barbara Jean Morehead; August 23, 1931 (age 95); Tucson, Arizona, U.S.
- Other name: Barbara Huffman
- Education: San Francisco Conservatory of Music
- Occupations: Actress, singer
- Years active: 1955–present
- Spouses: Michael Ansara (m. 1958; div. 1974); Charles Fegert (m. 1977; div. 1982); Jon Eicholtz (m. 1991)
- Children: 1
- Relatives: Katherine Fugate (niece)
- Website: www.barbaraeden.com

Barbara Eden (born Barbara Jean Morehead; August 23, 1931) is an American actress and singer. She is known for starring as the title character in the sitcom I Dream of Jeannie (1965–1970). Her other roles included Roslyn Pierce opposite Elvis Presley in Flaming Star (1960), Lieutenant (JG) Cathy Connors in Voyage to the Bottom of the Sea (1961), and a single widowed mother, Stella Johnson, in the film comedy Harper Valley PTA (1978) and in the spinoff television series.

Eden began singing in bands as a teenager and studied singing and acting. In 1955, she began her television career with appearances on The Johnny Carson Show and on various other series, such as Burke's Law. By 1957, she was starring in the comedy TV series How to Marry a Millionaire. She also began to act in plays. In 1959, she had her first major film role in A Private's Affair. After I Dream of Jeannie, Eden appeared mostly in dramatic roles, such as in the TV movie Stonestreet: Who Killed the Centerfold Model? (1977).

Eden also appeared in musical comedy tours, other theatrical roles and a TV broadcast of Kismet, released an album, appeared on variety television shows and USO shows, and headlined Las Vegas acts. After starring in the film and TV series Harper Valley PTA, she played opposite her I Dream of Jeannie co-star Larry Hagman on several occasions, including in five episodes of the final season of Dallas and the play Love Letters.

== Early years ==
Eden was born on August 23, 1931, in Tucson, Arizona, to Alice Mary (née Franklin) and Hubert Henry Morehead. She is a descendant of Benjamin Franklin. For decades, the public believed that the year of her birth was 1934. After her parents divorced, she and her mother moved to San Francisco, where her mother married Harrison Connor Huffman, a telephone lineman, by whom she had a daughter, Eden's half-sister. Eden grew up in San Francisco's Parkside neighborhood and traces her family back four generations in San Francisco, remembering stories about her grandmother who came in a covered wagon and her grandfather who arrived by clipper ship. The Great Depression affected the family deeply. As they were unable to afford many luxuries, Alice entertained her children with singing. Eden remembers having a "very musical family."

Eden's first public performance was with the church choir, where she sang solos. As a teenager, she sang in local bands led by Howard Fredericks and Freddie Martin. At 16, she studied singing with voice teacher Paulina Giovanini at the San Francisco Conservatory of Music and acting with the Elizabeth Holloway School of Theater. She graduated from Abraham Lincoln High School in San Francisco in 1949 and studied theater for one year at City College of San Francisco. As Barbara Huffman, she was crowned Miss San Francisco in 1951; she also entered the Miss California pageant.

=== Television and film roles ===
Eden began her television career as a semiregular on The Johnny Carson Show in 1955. She also made featured appearances on shows such as The West Point Story, Highway Patrol, Private Secretary, I Love Lucy, The Millionaire, Target: The Corruptors!, Crossroads, Perry Mason, Gunsmoke, December Bride, Bachelor Father, Father Knows Best, Adventures in Paradise, The Andy Griffith Show, Cain's Hundred, Saints and Sinners, The Virginian, Slattery's People, The Rogues, and the series finale of Route 66. She guest-starred in four episodes of Burke's Law, playing different roles each time. She was an uncredited extra in the movie The Tarnished Angels with Rock Hudson, in partnership with 20th Century Fox studios. She then starred in the syndicated comedy TV series How to Marry a Millionaire. The series is based on the 1953 film.

In 1957, Eden had minor roles in Bailout at 43,000, Will Success Spoil Rock Hunter?, and The Wayward Girl. In 1959, she became a leading lady, starring in A Private's Affair. She had a co-starring role in Flaming Star (1960) with Elvis Presley. In 1961, she played in a supporting role as Lt. Cathy Connors in Irwin Allen's Voyage to the Bottom of the Sea. In 1962, she starred in The Wonderful World of the Brothers Grimm, a Cinerama film directed by George Pal for MGM, and another Irwin Allen production for 20th Century Fox, Five Weeks in a Balloon. She was the female lead in the 1962 Fox comedy Swingin' Along, starring Tommy Noonan and Peter Marshall, in their final joint screen appearance. She did a screen test with Andy Williams for the 20th Century Fox movie State Fair, but did not get the role.

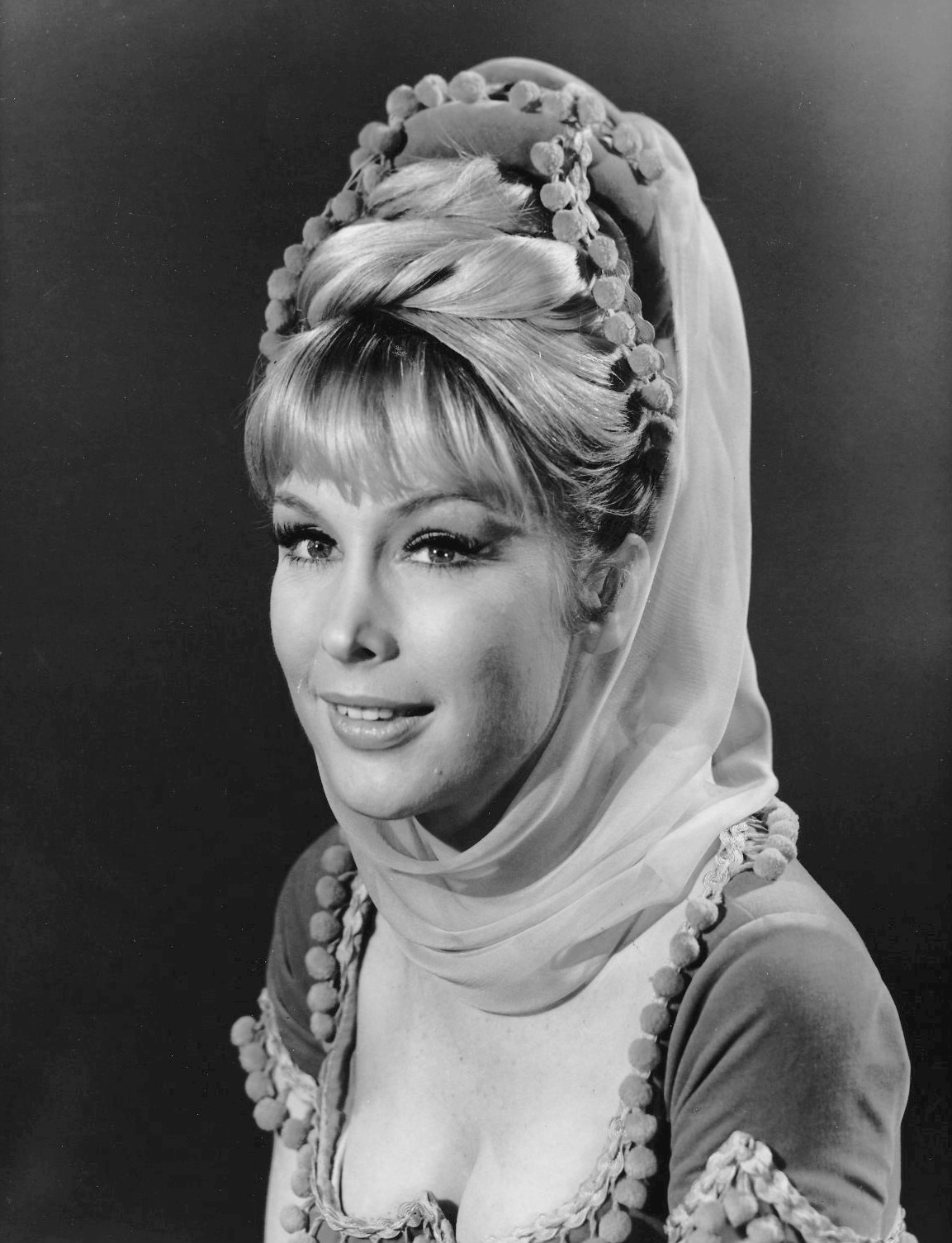
Eden as Jeannie in a variation of the Jeannie costume seen only in the pilot episode

Her last film for 20th Century Fox was The Yellow Canary (1963). She left Fox and began guest-starring in television shows and acting in films for MGM, Universal, and Columbia. She played supporting roles over the next few years, including The Brass Bottle and 7 Faces of Dr. Lao.

=== I Dream of Jeannie ===
In 1965, producer Sidney Sheldon signed Eden to star in his then-upcoming fantasy sitcom I Dream of Jeannie for NBC. After various brunette starlets and beauty queens had unsuccessfully tried out for the role, Eden was approached by Sheldon, who had seen her in The Brass Bottle and had received numerous recommendations for Eden from various colleagues. Eden played Jeannie, a beautiful genie set free from her bottle by astronaut and United States Air Force Captain (later Major) Anthony "Tony" Nelson, played by Larry Hagman. Eden played this role for five years and 139 episodes.

== Musicals and 1970s TV movies ==
Eden starred in such musical comedies as Nite Club Confidential (playing the role of Kay Goodman, in 1996), The Sound of Music, Annie Get Your Gun, South Pacific with Robert Goulet, The Pajama Game with John Raitt, and Gentlemen Prefer Blondes playing Lorelei Lee. She played Lalune in a TV adaptation of Kismet (1967). From April to September 1984, she starred in the national production of Woman of the Year, playing the role of Tess Harding Craig.

She has been a musical guest star in many variety television shows, including 21 Bob Hope specials, The Carol Burnett Show, The Jonathan Winters Show, The Jerry Lewis Show, This Is Tom Jones, Tony Orlando and Dawn, and Donny and Marie. She released an album titled Miss Barbara Eden in 1967 on Dot Records. She also had long-running stints headlining in Las Vegas.

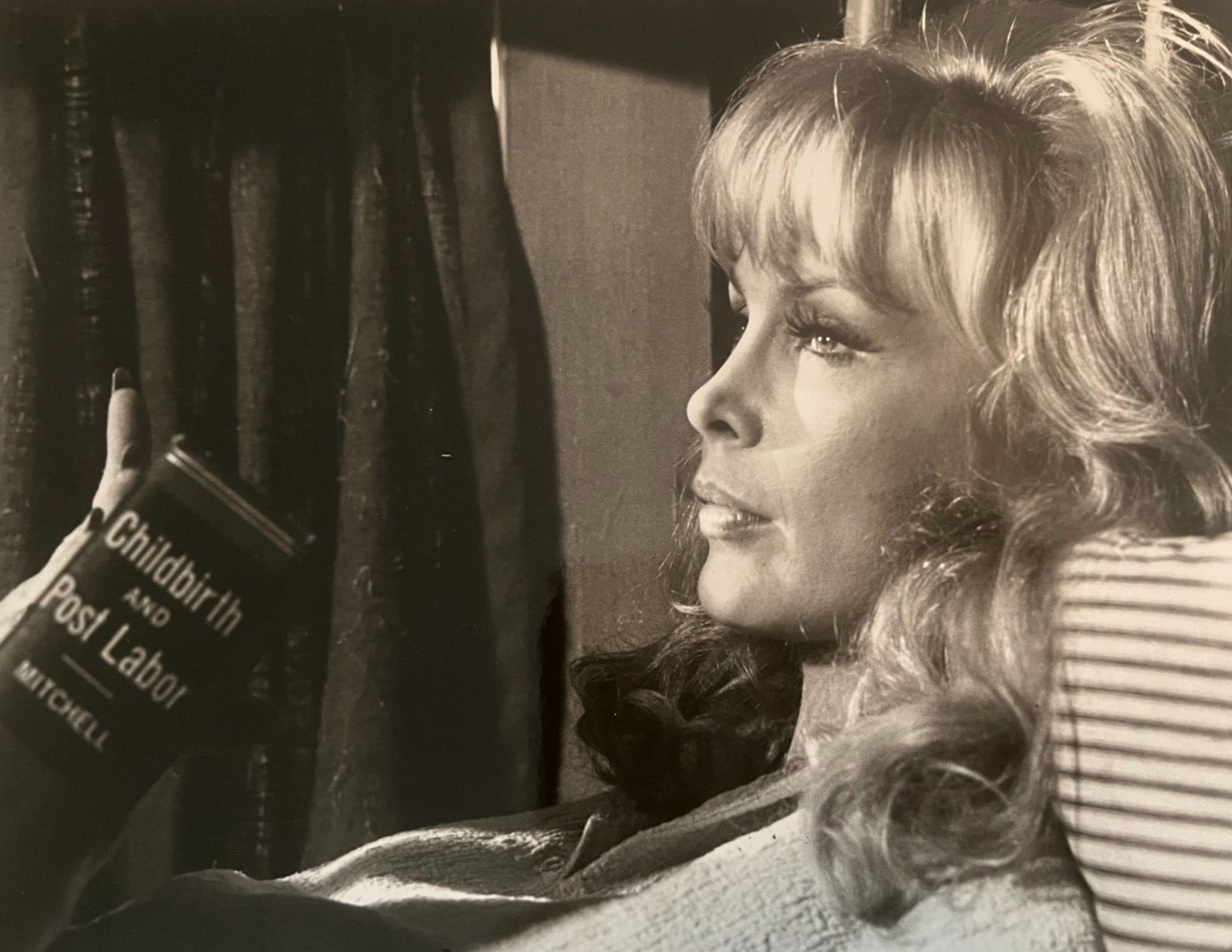
Eden in The Stranger Within (1974)

After Jeannie, Eden starred in the pilot for The Barbara Eden Show. Produced by then husband Michael Ansara, it aired on May 21, 1973. In 1974, another concept for The Barbara Eden Show was piloted. Originally named The Toy Game, the pilot was scheduled to air in 1974 but was preempted for coverage of a Presidential speech. Her first TV movie was called The Feminist and the Fuzz (1971). Although she is best known for comedy, most of these films were dramas, as when she starred opposite her Jeannie co-star Larry Hagman in A Howling in the Woods (1971).

In The Stranger Within (1974), Eden played housewife Ann Collins, a woman impregnated by extraterrestrials. In 1977, Eden played a policewoman-turned-private detective investigating the disappearance of a missing heiress, in the critically acclaimed TV movie Stonestreet: Who Killed the Centerfold Model?. She starred in and co-produced, with her own production company (MI-Bar Productions), the NBC-TV romantic comedy movie The Secret Life of Kathy McCormick (1988). She starred in and produced the romantic comedy TV movie Opposites Attract (1990), co-starring John Forsythe.

== Harper Valley PTA and later career ==
In 1978, she starred in the feature film Harper Valley PTA, based on the popular country song. This led to a namesake television series in 1981. In the movie and the TV series, Eden played the protagonist Stella Johnson. It was a comedy version of Peyton Place, with Anne Francine playing wealthy villainess Flora Simpson Reilly. In one episode, Stella dressed in a blue and gold genie costume. In another, she played Stella and her cousin Della Smith, similar to Jeannie's evil twin-sister character. It debuted January 16, 1981, winning 11 of its 13 time slots during the first season. It was renamed simply Harper Valley when it began its second season on October 29, 1981. During this time, Eden became the spokeswoman for L'eggs pantyhose, and appeared in a series of print advertisements and TV commercials for the brand from 1979 to 1983.

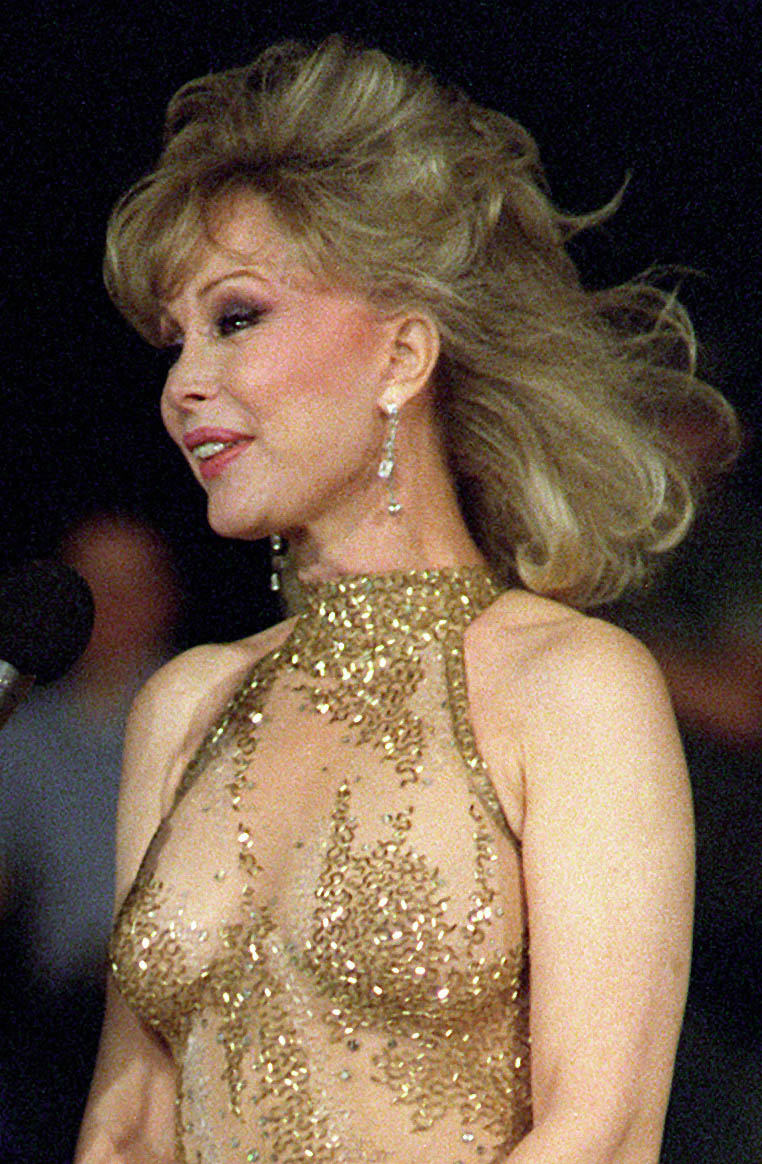
Eden in 1987 at a United Services Organization show aboard the amphibious assault ship USS Okinawa

In 1990, Eden played a recurring role as a billionairess seeking revenge against J.R. Ewing in five episodes of the final season of Dallas, as the captivating character LeeAnn de la Vega, reuniting her with Hagman. In her final episode, the character reveals that her maiden name is Nelson, a production in-joke referencing the surname of Hagman's character and the married name of Eden's character in I Dream of Jeannie. In 1991, she starred in the stage play Same Time, Next Year with Wayne Rogers, and reprised her role of Jeannie in a television movie-of-the-week. In 1993, she starred in an 11-city national tour of the play Last of the Red Hot Lovers with Don Knotts.

From 2000 to 2004, she starred in the national touring production of the play The Odd Couple: The Female Version playing the role of Florence Unger opposite Rita MacKenzie as Olive Madison. In March 2006, Eden reunited with her former co-star Larry Hagman for a publicity tour in New York City to promote the first-season DVD of I Dream of Jeannie. They appeared together on Good Morning America, The View, Access Hollywood, Entertainment Tonight, Martha, and Showbiz Tonight, among other shows.

In March 2006, Hagman and Eden again reunited, this time onstage in New York for Love Letters at the College of Staten Island, and at the United States Military Academy in West Point, New York. This was Eden's first return visit to the academy since appearing in the 1956 Ziv Television Programs, The West Point Story. Eden also starred in Love Letters opposite Hal Linden the same year and had a guest-starring role on the Lifetime series Army Wives. She starred in the TV movie Always and Forever on the Hallmark Channel in October 2009.

In May 2013, Eden appeared with former US President Bill Clinton, Elton John, and Fergie at the opening ceremony of the 21st Life Ball in Vienna, where Eden wore her familiar Jeannie harem costume. She was next cast in the movie One Song, filmed the same year. She has also done voice work for the animated children's television series Shimmer and Shine.

== Personal life ==
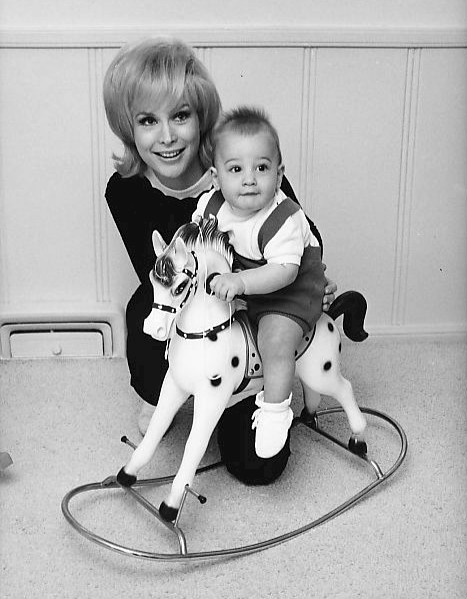
Eden with son Matthew Ansara in 1966

Eden wrote the memoir Jeannie Out of the Bottle, published on April 5, 2011 by Crown Archetype, a division of Random House. It debuted at number 14 on The New York Times Best Seller list. The book chronicles her personal life and Hollywood career of more than 50 years and includes intimate details about her early childhood, her rise to popularity in her teens and early 20s, her co-stars over the years, and her work leading to I Dream of Jeannie. It also covers her marriages to Michael Ansara (1958–1974), Charles Fegert (1977–1982), and Jon Eicholtz (1991–present), and her "emotional breakdown" following the 2001 death of her son Matthew Ansara (1965–2001) from a heroin overdose.

As of 2025, Eden continued to spend time with her husband, family and friends, while making guest appearances at comic book conventions and other fan-related events.

== Honors ==
On November 17, 1988, Eden received a star on the Hollywood Walk of Fame for her contributions to television. In 1990, the University of West Los Angeles law school granted Eden an honorary doctor of laws degree.

== Filmography ==
=== Feature films ===
Year	Title	Role	Notes
1956	Back from Eternity	Blonde College Girl	Uncredited
1957	Bailout at 43,000	Blonde at Nightclub	Uncredited
1957	Will Success Spoil Rock Hunter?	Miss Carstairs	With Tony Randall. Secretary (minor part)
1957	The Wayward Girl	Molly	
1959	A Private's Affair	Sgt. Katey Mulligan	
1960	Twelve Hours to Kill	Lucy Hall	
1960	Flaming Star	Roslyn Pierce	Opposite Elvis Presley
1960	From the Terrace	Clemmie Shreve	Minor part with Newman
1961	Swingin' Along	Carol Walker	
1961	All Hands on Deck	Sally Hobson	
1961	Voyage to the Bottom of the Sea	Lt. Cathy Connors	
1962	The Wonderful World of the Brothers Grimm	Greta Heinrich	
1962	Five Weeks in a Balloon	Susan Gale	With Red Buttons
1963	The Yellow Canary	Lissa Paxton	
1964	7 Faces of Dr. Lao	Angela Benedict	Opposite Tony Randall
1964	Quick, Let's Get Married	Pia Pacelli	
1964	The Brass Bottle	Sylvia Kenton	Opposite Tony Randall
1964	The New Interns	Laura Rogers	
1964	Ride the Wild Surf	Augie Poole	
1976	The Amazing Dobermans	Justine Pirot	
1978	Harper Valley PTA	Stella Johnson	
1984	Chattanooga Choo Choo	Maggie Jones	With Joe Namath
1985	The Fantasy Film Worlds of George Pal	Herself	Documentary
1987	Creepshow 2	Annie Lansing	Segment: “The Hitchhiker.” Replaced by Lois Chiles on set due to family emergency.
1996	A Very Brady Sequel	Jeannie	Cameo cross-over
2003	Loco Love	Jackie	
2003	Carolina	Daphne St. Claire	
2019	My Adventures with Santa	Mrs. Claus	

=== Television films ===
Year	Title	Role	Notes
1967	Kismet	Lalume	
1971	The Feminist and the Fuzz	Dr. Jane Bowers	
1971	A Howling in the Woods	Liza Crocker	Opposite Larry Hagman
1972	The Woman Hunter	Dina Hunter	
1973	Guess Who's Sleeping in My Bed?	Francine Gregory	
1974	The Stranger Within	Ann Collins	
1975	Let's Switch!	Lacy Colbert	
1976	How to Break Up a Happy Divorce	Ellen Dowling	
1977	Stonestreet: Who Killed the Centerfold Model?	Liz Stonestreet	
1979	The Girls in the Office	Lee Rawlins	
1980	Condominium	Barbara Messenger	
1981	Return of the Rebels	Mary Beth Allen	With Patrick Swayze
1985	I Dream of Jeannie... Fifteen Years Later	Jeannie / Jeannie II	Wayne Rogers as Tony Nelson
1987	The Stepford Children	Laura Harding	
1988	The Secret Life of Kathy McCormick	Kathy McCormick	
1989	Your Mother Wears Combat Boots	Brenda Andersen	With Matthew Ansara
1990	Opposites Attract	Charlene "Charlie" McKeon	
1991	Her Wicked Ways	Tess O'Brien	
1991	Hell Hath No Fury	Terri Ferguson	
1991	I Still Dream of Jeannie	Jeannie / Jeannie II	With Bill Daily
1993	Visions of Murder	Dr. Jesse Newman	
1994	Eyes of Terror	Dr. Jesse Newman	
1996	Dead Man's Island	Henrietta O'Dwyer Collins	Opposite William Shatner
2009	Always & Forever	Mary Anderson	
2013	One Song	Unknown supporting actor	Undistributed film

=== Television series ===
Year	Title	Role	Notes
1956	The Johnny Carson Show	Herself (semi-regular performer)	14 episodes
1956	The West Point Story	Toni DeWitt	Episode: "A Tough Decision"
1957	Highway Patrol	Kathy O'Shea	Episode: "Hostage Copter"
1957	I Love Lucy	Diana Jordan	Episode: "Country Club Dance"
1957	The Millionaire	Billie Walker	Episode: "The Ted McAllister Story"
1957	Crossroads	Polly Grant	Episode: "A Green Hill Faraway"
1957–1959	How to Marry a Millionaire	Loco Jones	52 episodes
1957	Perry Mason	Carla Adrian	Episode: "The Case of the Angry Mourner"
1957	Gunsmoke	Judy Pierce	Episode: "Romeo"
1957	Bachelor Father	Patricia "Patty" Robbins	Episode: "Bentley and the Revolving Housekeepers"
1957	December Bride	Miss Wilson	Episode: "The Other Woman"
1958	Father Knows Best	Marge Corbett	Episode: "The Rivals"
1958	The Lineup	Eleanor	Episode: "The Samuel Bradford Case"
1961	Adventures in Paradise	Ginny Grant	Episode: "The Inheritance"
1962	The Andy Griffith Show	Ellen Brown	Episode: "The Manicurist"
1962	Target: The Corruptors!	Lili	Episode: "Babes in Wall Street"
1962	Cain's Hundred	Terri Emson	Episode: "Savage in Darkness"
1962	Saints and Sinners	Nora Love	Episode: "Daddy's Girl"
1963	Dr. Kildare	Nurse Judy Gail	Episode: "If You Can't Believe the Truth"
1963–1964	Rawhide	Crystal Simpson / Goldie Rogers	2 episodes: "Incident at Confidence Creek," 1963; "Damon's Road," 1964
1963–1965	Burke's Law	Various Characters	4 episodes: "Who killed Harris Crown?", 1963; "Who killed Cornelius Gilbert?", 1964; "Who killed Paper Dragon?", 1964; "Who killed the Man on the White Horse?", 1965
1964	Route 66	Margo Tiffin / Margo Stiles	Episodes: "Where There's a Will, There's a Way" (Parts 1 & 2)
1964	The Virginian	Samantha Fry	Episode: "The Brazos Kid"
1965	Slattery's People	Lucrezia Kirk	Episode: "Question: When Do We Hang the Good Samaritan?"
1965	The Rogues	Sally Cardew	Episode: "Wherefore Art Thou, Harold?"
1965–1970	I Dream of Jeannie	Jeannie / Jeannie II	139 episodes. 30 first-season episodes filmed in Black and White; Nominated – Golden Globe Award for Best TV Star – Female (1966); Nominated – Golden Globe Award for Best TV Actress – Musical or Comedy (1969)
1967	Off to See the Wizard	Melinda	Episode: "Hell Cats"
1972	Love is Barbara Eden	Herself	Variety TV Special with Tim Conway
1973	The Barbara Eden Show	Barbara Norris	1 episode. Unsold TV Pilot. Unaired
1973	The Toy Game	Unknown	1 episode. Unsold TV Pilot. Unaired. Paired with Larry Hagman.
1974	Out to Lunch	Herself (guest star)	TV special
1975	NBC Special Treat	Narrator (voice)	Episode: "Flight from Fuji"
1980	Men Who Rate a 10	Guest Host	
1981–1982	Harper Valley PTA	Stella Johnson	30 episodes. Young Matthew Ansara appearances
1981	It's Only Human	Guest Host	Appearance by Reggie Jackson
1989–1990	Brand New Life	Barbara McCray Gibbons	6 episodes
1990–1991	Dallas	LeeAnn De La Vega	5 episodes: "The Odessa File", 1990; "Sail On", 1991; "Lock, Stock and Jock", 1991; "'S' Is for Seduction", 1991; "Designing Women", 1991
2002–2003	Sabrina the Teenage Witch	Aunt Irma	3 episodes: "A Birthday Witch", 2002; "The Arrangement", 2002; "A Fish Tale", 2003
2003	Teamo Supremo	Evelyn (voice)	Episode: "Brenda's Birthday Bandit"
2007	George Lopez	Ruth	Episode: "George is Maid to be Ruth-Less"
2007	Army Wives	Victoria Grayson	Episode: "Truth and Consequences"
2016	Worst Cooks in America season 9	Herself (contestant)	2 episodes
2016–2017	Shimmer and Shine	Empress Caliana (voice)	2 episodes: "The Crystal Queen", 2016; "Samira and Zeta", 2017
2018	Long Island Medium	Herself	Episode: "Sitcom Spirits"
2020–2022	Master Dearest, from the Diaries of Jeannie	Jeannie (voice)	YouTube only Special. 3 episodes: "The Island", 2020; "Happy Anniversary!", 2021; "Top Secret Anniversary", 2022

== Selected stage productions ==
Year	Title	Role
1964	The Pajama Game	Babe Williams
1966	Finian's Rainbow	Sharon McLonergan
1970	The Sound of Music	Maria von Trapp
1971	The Unsinkable Molly Brown	Molly Brown
1973	Annie Get Your Gun	Annie Oakley
1977	Blithe Spirit	Elvira
1982	The Best Little Whorehouse in Texas	Miss Mona Stangley
1984	Woman of the Year	Tess Harding
1986	South Pacific	Nellie Forbush
1991	Same Time, Next Year	Doris
1993	Last of the Red Hot Lovers	Elaine Navazio / Jeanette Fisher
1995	Nite Club Confidential	Kay Goodman
1998	Gentlemen Prefer Blondes	Lorelei Lee
2000	The Odd Couple: The Female Version	Florence Unger
2004	The Odd Couple: The Female Version	Florence Unger
2006	Love Letters	Melissa Gardner
2012	Social Security	Sophie
2019	Love Letters	Melissa Gardner
2025	Love Letters	Melissa Gardner

== Discography ==
=== Singles ===
Year	Title	Label
1967	"I Wouldn't Be a Fool / Bend It!"	Dot Records
1967	"Rebel"	Dot Records
1967	"Pledge of Love / I'm a Fool to Care"	Dot Records
1978	"Widow Jones"	Plantation Records

=== Albums ===
Year	Title	Album	Notes
1967	Miss Barbara Eden	Dot Records	
1978	Harper Valley PTA (soundtrack)	Plantation Records	Performed 2 songs: "Mr. Harper", "Widow Jones"

== Books ==
- Eden, Barbara, and Warburton, Dustin. Barbara and the Djinn. Neighborhood Publishers. 2021
- Eden, Barbara, and Leigh, Wendy. Jeannie out of the Bottle. Norwalk, CT: Easton Press. 2011.
- Smith, Joe. Las Vegas Celebrity Cookbook: The private recipes of 50 international entertainers. Hollybrooke House. 1982.

== Audiobooks ==
- 2011: Jeannie Out of the Bottle, with Wendy Leigh (read by the author), Random House Audio, ISBN 978-0-3079-1434-7
- 2026: Where the Light Is Brighter by C. C. Griffin and Thomas G. Fiffer, principally narrated by Eden
