= Playboy Club =

Chain of night clubs

- Type: Subsidiary
- Industry: Nightclubs
- Founded: February 29, 1960; 66 years ago, Chicago, Illinois, U.S.
- Founder: Hugh Hefner
- Headquarters: United States
- Parent: Playboy Enterprises

The Playboy Club was initially a chain of nightclubs and resorts owned and operated by Playboy Enterprises. Since 2021, Playboy Club has also been the name of the chain's digital platform.

== Playboy Clubs ==
The first Playboy Club opened in Chicago in 1960. Each club generally featured a Living Room, a Playmate Bar, a Dining Room, and a Club Room. Members and their guests were served food and drinks by Playboy Bunnies, some of whom were featured in Playboy magazine. The clubs offered name entertainers and comedians in the Club Rooms, and local musicians and the occasional close-up magician in the Living Rooms. Starting with the London and Jamaica club locations, the Playboy Club became international in scope.

In 1991, the club chain became defunct. Thereafter, on October 6, 2006, a Playboy Club was opened in Las Vegas at the Palms Casino Resort, and in 2010 clubs were opened as well in Macau and Cancún. In time, the Las Vegas club closed on June 4, 2012, the Macao club closed in 2013, and the Cancún club closed in 2014. In May 2014 the Commerce Casino in Los Angeles opened a Playboy-themed lounge consisting of gaming tables and Playboy Bunny cocktail waitresses. In September 2018, a Playboy Club was opened in Midtown Manhattan but permanently closed in November 2019 after just over one year in operation. In August 2025, Playboy announced it was opening a new club at its relocated headquarters in Miami Beach, Florida.

=== History ===
The first club opened at 116 E. Walton Street in downtown Chicago, Illinois, United States, on February 29, 1960. The opening acts were comedian Dick Gregory and then 17-year old singer Aretha Franklin. Chicago jazz pianist, Sam Distefano, was the musical director. It relocated to Clark and Armitage in Lincoln Park in 1980 and closed in June 1986. Over the next 25 years, 30 clubs (with St. Louis franchise owner moving buildings in 1975, from Lindell Boulevard to Ramada Inn, South Lindbergh) had been established across the United States:

Location	Opened	Closed
Chicago	February 29, 1960	June 30, 1986
Miami	May 20, 1961	1985
New Orleans	October 13, 1961	1974
St. Louis	October 16, 1962	September 25, 1975
New York	December 8, 1962	1981
Phoenix	December 21, 1962	June 1983
Detroit	December 27, 1963	October 29, 1972
Detroit	1974	1978
Baltimore	1964	1977
Cincinnati	1964	1983
Kansas City	June 13, 1964	1972
Los Angeles	December 31, 1964	June 30, 1986
Atlanta	March 1965	1975
San Francisco	November 13, 1965	July 10, 1976
Boston	February 1966	1977
Denver	December 9, 1967	1977
Lake Geneva	May 6, 1968	1981
Playboy Plaza Hotel, Miami Beach	1970	1981
Great Gorge Playboy Club Hotel, McAfee	1972	1981
Buffalo	March 1975	1991
Ramada Inn, St. Louis	December 31, 1975	August 11, 1985
Buffalo	April 24, 1981	1985
Dallas	1977	1982
Playboy Towers, Chicago	1979	1986
St. Petersburg	1980	1983
San Diego	December 1981	July 1982
Columbus	1982	1985
Lansing	September 17, 1982	July 31, 1988
New York Empire Club	1985	June 30, 1986
Omaha	May 18, 1984	1988
Des Moines	December 3, 1984	April 1988

There was also a Playboy Club in London, UK, opened in 1966 (closed in 1981), and in Montreal, Canada, which opened on July 15, 1967 (closed in 1976). Playboy Clubs operated in Japan, under a franchise arrangement, in Tokyo, Osaka, Nagoya, and Sapporo. The first Japanese club opened in Tokyo in 1983, and the final club to close in Japan was in Tokyo in 2008. There was also a Playboy Club resort in Ocho Rios, Jamaica, opened in December 1964. It was a club resort similar to the ones in USA in Great Gorge at McAfee, New Jersey and at Lake Geneva, Wisconsin, as well as Club-Hotels such as the Playboy Plaza in Miami Beach, Florida and Playboy Towers in Chicago. The last American location before Playboy Club Las Vegas opened was in Buffalo, New York, located at the Playboy International Hotel, which closed in 1991.

International clubs existed until the 1991 closing of the Manila, Philippines Club located in the Silahis International Hotel. In 2010, International Clubs were opened in Macao and Cancún but, in time, the Macao Club closed in 2013, and the Cancún Club closed in 2014. Manila was the only club ever to be featured in Architectural Digest.

During the last three months of 1961, more than 132,000 people visited the Chicago club, making it the busiest nightclub in the world. Playboy Club membership became a status symbol. Only 21% of all key holders ever went to a club. At $25.00 per year per membership, Playboy grossed $25 million for every 1,000,000 members.

The Rabbit-headed metal Playboy key (supplanted by a metal key-card in 1966) was required for admission to a club. They were presented to the Door Bunny.

In 1965, Hugh Hefner sent Victor Lownes to London to open Playboy's British casinos, following legalization of gambling in the United Kingdom. Playboy's musical director, Sam Distefano, set up the entertainment policy for the London Playboy Club and Casino. In 1981, the casino at 45 Park Lane (now a luxury hotel, 45 Park Lane) was the most profitable casino in the world, and the British casinos contributed $32 million to the corporation. Later, Playboy also operated British casinos in Manchester and Portsmouth. In 1981, Playboy opened a hotel and casino in Atlantic City, New Jersey, with an 800-seat showroom designed by Playboy's vice-president of entertainment, Sam Distefano. However, the New Jersey gaming regulators denied Playboy a permanent gaming license, and Playboy sold its interest in the unit to Elsinore Corporation, its partner in the venture, in 1984, at which time the hotel and casino were renamed The Atlantis.

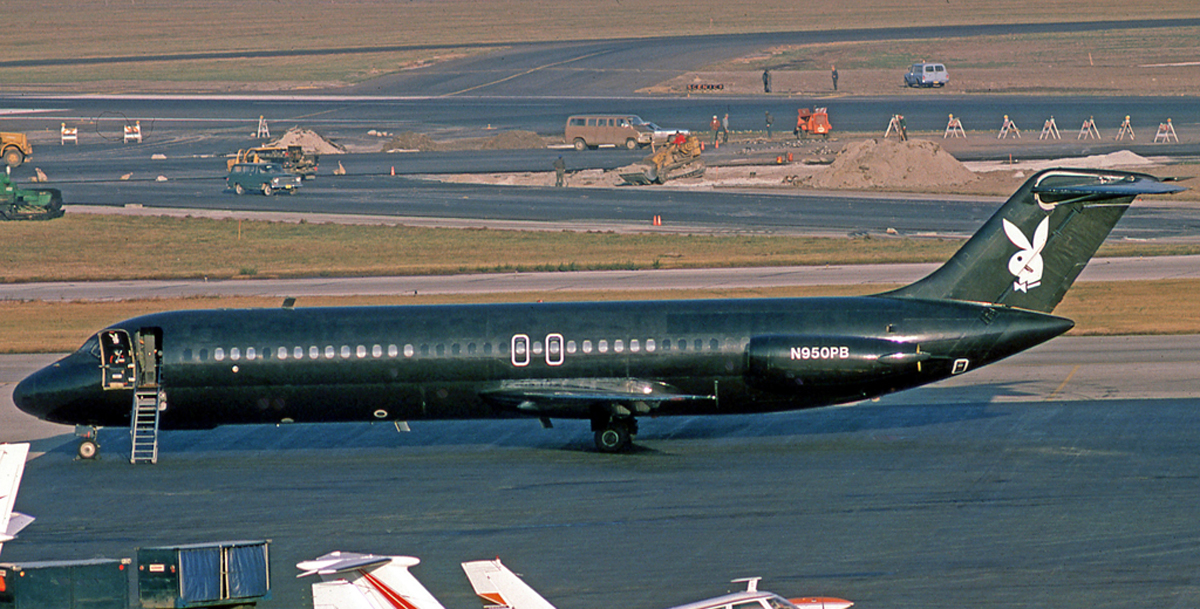
The Playboy Club's Douglas DC-9 jet airliner executive aircraft at Chicago O'Hare International Airport in 1975. It was used for transporting guests and staff.

The Playboy Club in Lake Geneva, Wisconsin featured architecture inspired by Frank Lloyd Wright, operated from May 6, 1968, until 1981, had a ski slope, and was one of the first to install a chair lift. The facility is now operated as the Grand Geneva Resort & Spa. The 32-piece house orchestra was headed by Chicago pianist, Sam Distefano, who conducted for performers such as Frank Sinatra, Peggy Lee, Mel Tormé, Liza Minnelli, Sonny & Cher, Dean Martin, Sammy Davis Jr., Paul Anka, Dionne Warwick, Eddie Fisher, Wayne Newton, Vic Damone, Diahann Carroll, Bette Midler, Frankie Avalon, Anthony Newley, Vikki Carr, Tony Bennett, Natalie Cole, Donna Summer and Ann-Margret. Distefano went on to serve as Playboy's vice president of entertainment for all Playboy Clubs and Hotels worldwide, until he retired from Playboy after his 25-year career with Hef, to relocate to Las Vegas as the Riviera Hotel and Casino's vice president for 12 years for its owners, Israeli billionaire and financier, Meshulam Riklis and Riklis' wife, singer, Pia Zadora (whom also had formerly headlined with Distefano and his orchestra at the Playboy Club Hotel in Lake Geneva in the mid-1970's).

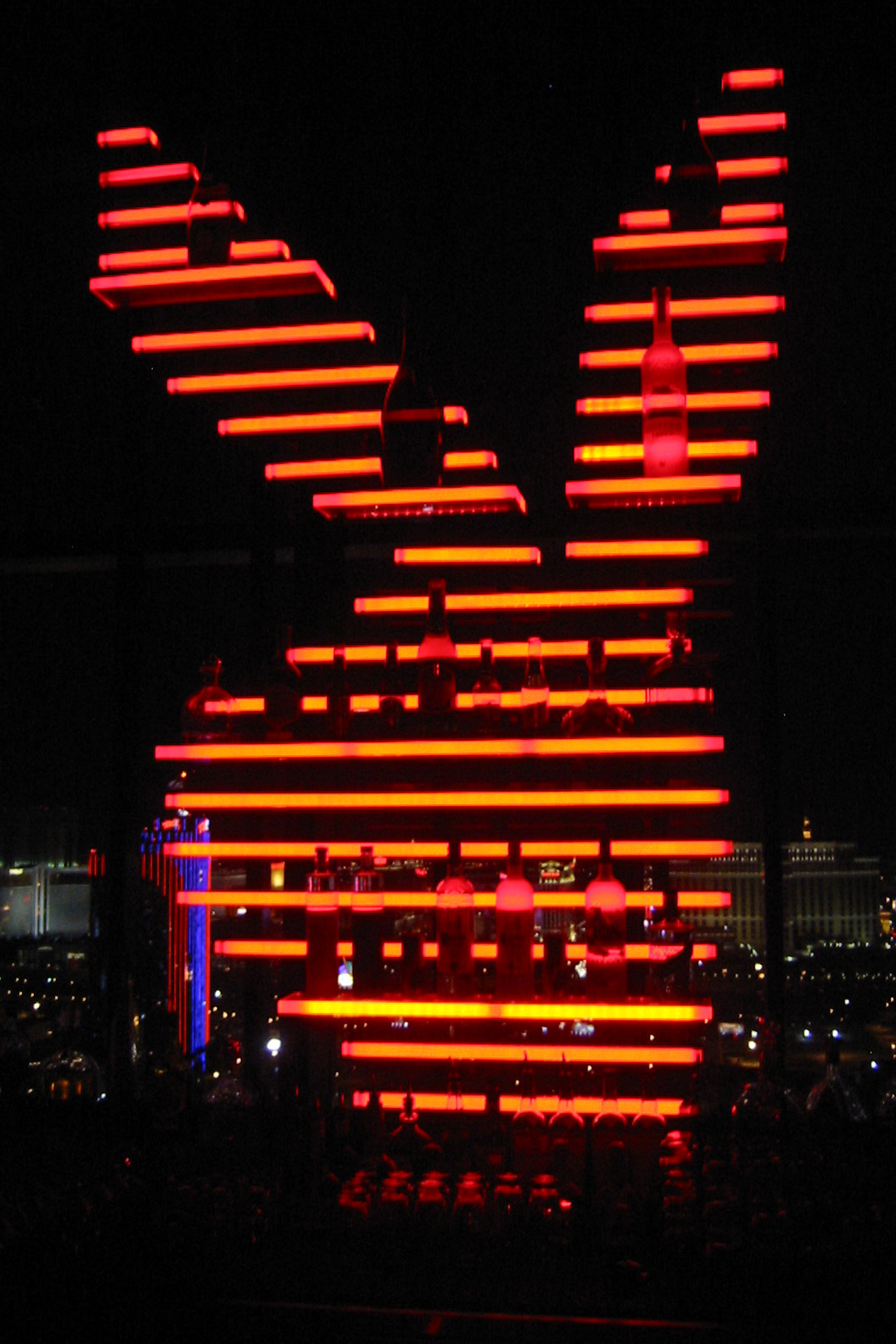
Playboy Club Bar at the Palms in Las Vegas

On October 6, 2006, Playboy opened a new Playboy Club in Las Vegas, Nevada. The new club at The Palms, with its prominent neon bunny head, had casinos, bars, and a restroom with pictures of Playmates on the walls. The club closed in June 2012.

Australian women were invited to Sydney to audition for the iconic Playboy Bunny role and for positions as singers and dancers at the Playboy Club. A minimum of five women were chosen to travel to Macao for a six-month contract as a Playboy Bunny. The Macao Playboy Club opened on November 24, 2010.

In October 2010, it was announced that a new Playboy Club in London was to be opened on the site of the old Rendezvous Mayfair Casino 14 Old Park Lane. It was opened on June 4, 2011. The 17,000 sq ft property, spread over two floors, was designed by London-based architects Jestico + Whiles. The club features a casino, cigar terrace, gentleman's tonic, sports bar ("The Player's Lounge"), night club ("The Tale Bar"), cocktail bar under the direction of Salvatore Calabrase, and a fine dining restaurant under the reins of Iron Chef Judy Joo. Along the stair-walls, a row of lenticular portraits are hung winking and smiling at guests as they walk by.

In November 2012, spokesman Sanjay Gupta announced that PB Lifestyle, the company in India with rights to the brand, would be opening its first club in India at Candolim, Goa in December 2012. It was planned as a 22,000 square feet (2,000 m^{2}) beach location. In April 2013, Goa Chief Minister Manohar Parrikar refused the application on "technical grounds". Parrikar said only individuals, not corporations, were eligible to operate a beach shack style club. The law did not preclude opening a night club. After the Goa club, PB Lifestyle planned to open clubs in Hyderabad and Mumbai. India's obscenity laws ban material deemed "lascivious or appealing to prurient interests". Adult magazines such as Playboy are banned in India. Designer Mohini Tadikonda has altered the original Playboy Bunnies uniform to satisfy India's obscenity laws.

On September 12, 2018, a Playboy Club was opened in New York City at 512 West 42nd Street in Midtown Manhattan. Many questioned the wisdom of opening a Playboy Club in the #MeToo era. On November 14, 2019, after just over one year in operation, the owners of the new Playboy Club in New York City announced the club had permanently closed and the space would be re-branded as a steak house and other entertainment venue. On August 15, 2025, Playboy announced it was opening a new club while relocating their headquarters in Miami Beach, Florida.

The original New York City Playboy Club closed its doors in 1986 but was not repurposed until 2024, when the building was bought for $26.7 million in a foreclosure auction.

== In popular culture ==
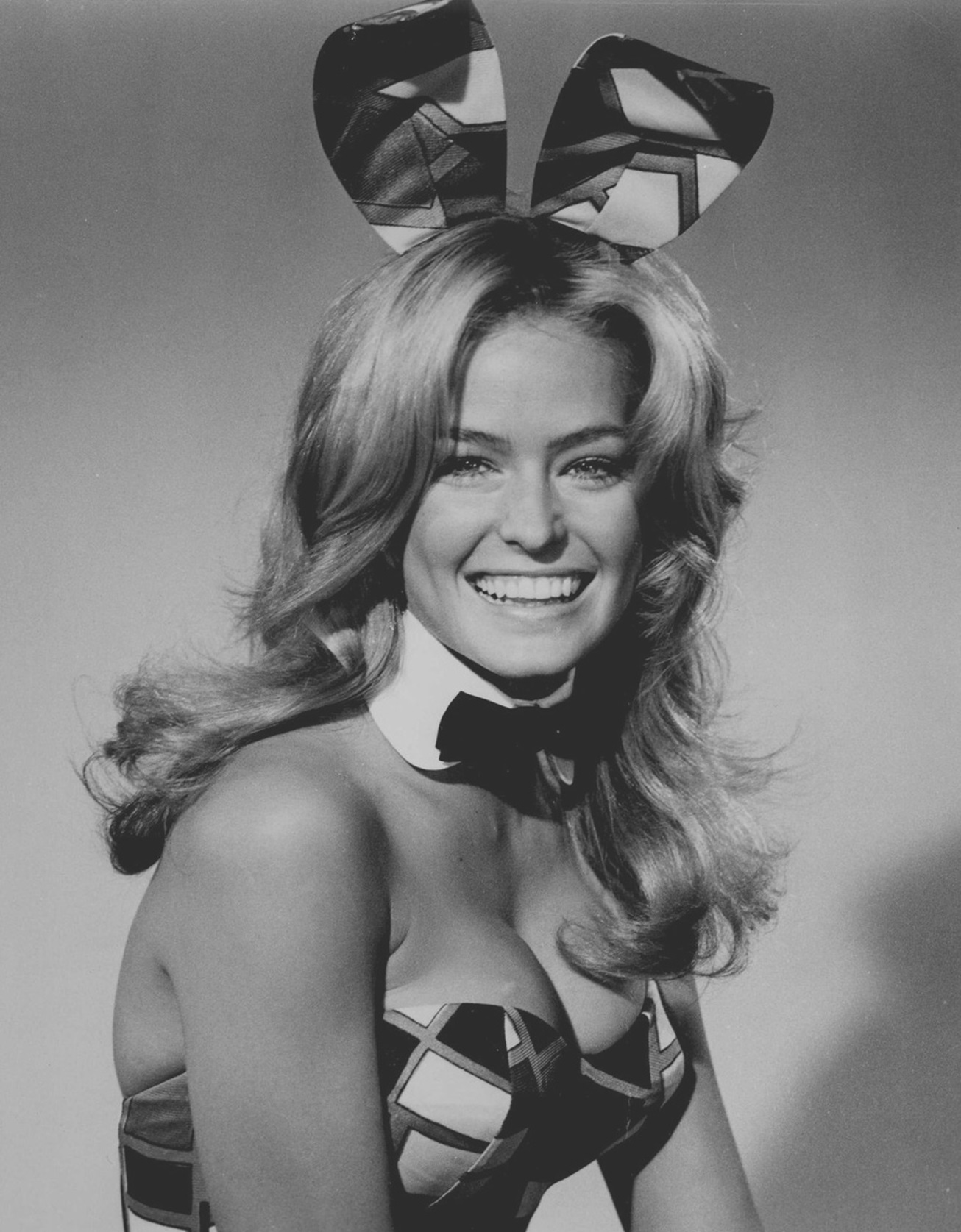
Farrah Fawcett as a Playboy Bunny in The Feminist and the Fuzz, 1971

- In the Dick Van Dyke Show Season 5, Episode 7 ("The Great Petrie Fortune"): Rob's Uncle's desk has a Bunny Key that Laura quickly takes from Rob.
- In the James Bond film Diamonds Are Forever (1971), Bond replaces his wallet with that of the recently killed diamond smuggler Peter Franks to confuse his contact, Tiffany Case. When she opens the wallet she finds Bond's Playboy Club Member Card, which she uses to identify the man on the floor.
- In a 1982 episode of the TV show Laverne & Shirley, entitled "The Playboy Show", guest-starring Carrie Fisher, Laverne takes a job as a Playboy Bunny at The Playboy Club despite her father's wishes.
- The 1985 TV movie A Bunny's Tale, starring Kirstie Alley, was based on writer and future feminist leader Gloria Steinem's 1963 article for Huntington Hartford's Show magazine, a critical account of her time working as a Playboy Bunny at the New York Playboy Club.
- The 2000 TV film, A Tale of Two Bunnies (aka Price of Beauty) starring Marina Black and Julie Condra, tells the story of two girls working as Playboy Bunnies in 1961.
- In the 2008 film The House Bunny, Shelly Darlingson (portrayed by Anna Faris), is a former Playboy bunny who signs up to be the "housemother" of Zeta Alpha Zeta, an unpopular university sorority after finding out she must leave the Playboy Mansion (via a forged note from a rival). Shelly takes the dowdy, socially awkward members of ZAZ and turns them around... Learning a bit about herself in the process.
- In season one, episode two of the TV show Swingtown, first aired in 2008, the characters visit the Playboy Club.
- In a 2010 episode of the TV show Mad Men (season 4, episode 10 "Hands and Knees"), Lane Pryce (who is a member) takes his father and Don Draper to dinner at the Playboy Club in New York City and introduces them to his "chocolate bunny" girlfriend, Toni.
- September 2011 saw the premiere of NBC's The Playboy Club, a television series focusing on the employees and patrons of the first Playboy Club, located in Chicago. The series was cancelled after airing three episodes.

== The digital era (aka Centerfold) ==
Playboy was one of the earliest corporate victims of the COVID-19 pandemic. In March 2020, the company announced that the next issue of the magazine would be, at minimum, the final issue published that year.

As mentioned in Playboy's press release, on December 20, 2021, Playboy launched the digital version of Playboy Club (initially branded as Centerfold), the new home for the world's top creators to interact directly with their fans, expand their communities and build their own personal content and commerce businesses. It is dedicated to creative freedom, artistic expression, and sex positivity, as the next evolution of Playboy's long history at the intersection of culture and sex.

According to Bandt, Playboy has relaunched its magazine as a digital-first publication to rival OnlyFans offering an "elevated", "safe", and "exclusive" alternative.

Instead of the Playboy bunnies of old, readers will get Playboy "creators" who will post both adult and non-adult content on their pages, give subscribers exclusive access to their lives, and grace the magazine's online covers. It will allow the creators to build a base of paying subscribers as well as have access to the main magazine.

=== Famous creators on Playboy Club ===
Centerfold's founding creator community represents hundreds of millions of social media followers. Hailing from the worlds of music, fashion, fitness and adult entertainment, Centerfold's founding launch creators include:

- Cardi B, who also serves as the platform's Founding Creative Director
- Amanda Cerny
- Lana Rhodes
- Gigi Goode
- Elsa Jean
- Ana Foxxx
- Mia Malkova
- Keegan Whicker
- Kate Amouranth
- Leila Leilani
- James Maas
- Mia Khalifa, who was reportedly released from the creator platform of Playboy Club and her podcasting contract with Playboy in October 2023, after sharing her stance on the Israel-Hamas conflict.
