= Techmeme =

Technology news aggregator

- Website type: Technology news aggregator
- Owner: Gabe Rivera
- Website: techmeme.com
- Launched: September 2005

Techmeme is a technology news aggregator. The website has been described as "a one-page, aggregated, filtered, archiveable summary in near real-time of what is new and generating conversation".

== Overview ==
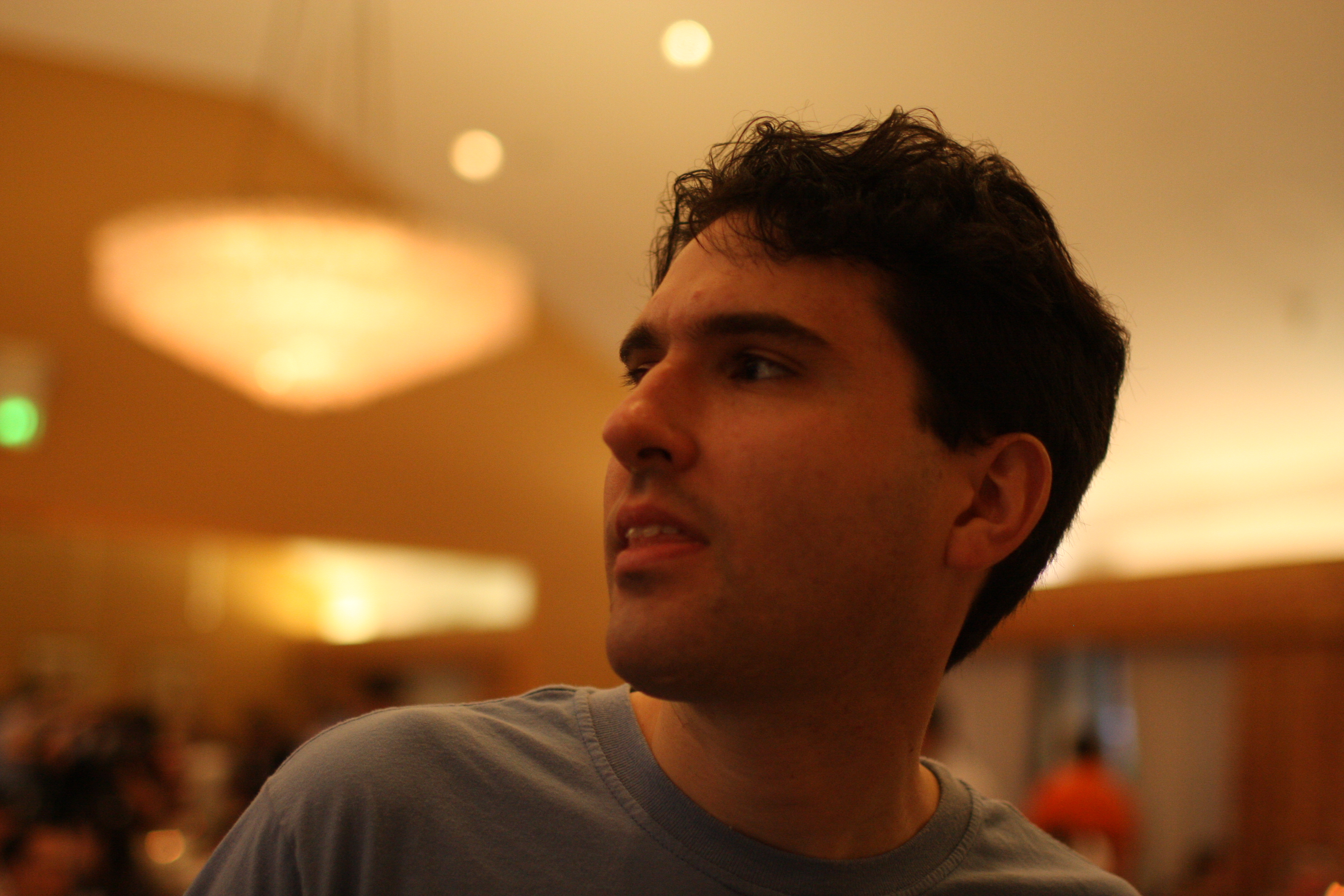
Gabe Rivera in 2008

Gabe Rivera was a compiler software engineer at Intel before launching tech.memeorandum on September 12, 2005. After working on tech.memeorandum for a year, it was renamed to Techmeme. The website is funded entirely by Rivera, and has no investors.

== Websites ==
Techmeme uses an algorithm to order stories by importance, which depends on several factors that include the number of links to the story's web page and how old the story is. "Anti-gaming" efforts have been made to lower the effect that a high number of links can have on a story if the links were created in a short period of time, or by a small number of people. The website has a Techmeme Sponsors Program which accepts payment in exchange for a dedicated section for sponsors. A search engine was added to the website on May 20, 2008, which searches all archived stories that have appeared on the website as a full headline. Two weeks later, a "prospective search feature" was added to Techmeme, which allows users to subscribe to future search results and receive notifications when a headline matches their search pattern.

The team and technology behind Techmeme also powers media news aggregator Mediagazer.com ("relies on Techmeme editors"), The political aggregation site Memeorandum.com, and celebrity gossip aggregator WeSmirch.com. "run without human editors". The baseball aggregation site Ballbug.com, offers news sourced from baseball websites.

== Technology ==
Techmeme works by scraping news websites and blogs, and then compiles a list of links to the most popular technology-related news of the day, which is continuously updated. The stories selected are chosen primarily by an automated process. The service is fed a list of websites, and then it finds other websites that are similar to these to find similar news stories and to keep the focus on technology news. Once the website finds sources that provide a good source of technology news, they are added to Techmeme's database so that it can track them for future updates. In December 2008, the original automated process was supplemented by two human editors—Megan McCarthy and Omer Horvitz—who manage the mix of headlines. Three additional editors were added in November 2009, Rich DeMuro, Lidija Davis and Mahendra Palsule. Rivera has suggested that website owners get linked to by other web pages when possible because it increases the chances that Techmeme will find their website.
