= Silahis International Hotel =

Abandoned hotel in the Philippines

- Interactive map of the Silahis International Hotel area
- Alternative names: Sofitel Grand Boulevard Hotel; Grand Boulevard Hotel
- Hotel chain: Sofitel (former)

General information
- Status: Demolished
- Location: Roxas Boulevard, Manila, Philippines
- Coordinates: 14°34′03.6″N 120°59′04.2″E
- Opened: 1978
- Closed: July 9, 2008; 18 years ago
- Demolished: 2024
- Owner: Silahis International Hotel, Pacific Wide Realty and Development Corp (2007–present; disputed)

Technical details
- Floor count: 21

Design and construction
- Architect: Lor Calma

Other information
- Number of rooms: 600
- Facilities: Stargazer (former); Playboy Club (1978–1991)

The Silahis International Hotel, later known as the Sofitel Grand Boulevard Hotel, was a hotel in Manila, Philippines.

== History ==
=== Early years ===
The Silahis International Hotel was built in the 1970s, during a construction boom of hotels due to the then-upcoming hosting of the 1976 International Monetary Fund and the World Bank Summits by the Philippines. President Ferdinand Marcos streamlined the construction of several hotels in Metro Manila in anticipation of the international meetings. In addition to foreign business and leisure travelers, the hotel also accommodated nightclub partygoers and socialites. First Lady Imelda Marcos frequently hosted events in the hotel.

The hotel was owned by the Enriquez-Panlilio family who were involved in the real estate and shipping industry. They acquired the hotel from the Development Bank of the Philippines (DBP).

=== Sequestration by the PCGG ===
Following the deposing of President Marcos in the 1986 People Power Revolution which led to Corazon Aquino's installment as president, the national government seized properties of the Marcos family and their associates. This was part of the Aquino's administration bid to recover the ill-gotten wealth. The Enriquez-Panlilio family was accused of acquiring the hotel from the DBP for an undervalued price and improper means. The Silahis Hotel was taken over by the Presidential Commission on Good Government (PCGG) in July 1989 which led to a years-long legal challenge by the Enriquez-Panlilio family disputing PCGG's seizing. The Sandiganbayan lifted the PCGG's sequestration orders, effectively reverting the hotel back to the Enriquez-Panlilios, which was upheld by the Supreme Court.

=== Sofitel ===
AccorHotels later took over Silahis International Hotel, rebranding it as the Sofitel Grand Boulevard Hotel. After its contract ended, AccorHotels acquired the nearby Westin Philippine Plaza, which it rebranded to the Sofitel Philippine Plaza Hotel in 2006.

=== Grand Boulevard Hotel ===
After AccorHotels disassociated with the Grand Boulevard Hotel, tax payment issues with the Manila city government marred the hotel. This led to the Manila government to auction off the associated property to Pacific Wide Realty and Development Corp. in November 2007 which was disputed by the original hotel owners. On July 9, 2008, the hotel ceased operations.

Demolition of the hotel seems to have been completed as of July 20, 2024.

== Architecture and design ==
The Silahis International Hotel was designed by architects Regelio Villarosa and Lor Calma. The hotel building which has 21-storeys was built along Roxas Boulevard near the Plaza Rajah Sulayman and Manila Bay.

== Facilities ==
The hotel had 600 rooms. It also hosted two noted nightclubs; the Stargazer of Louie Ysmael and the Playboy Club of Manila (a Playboy Club franchise). The Playboy Club of Manila operated from 1978 to 1991. Its interior is a Presumed Important Cultural Property due to being a work of Ildefonso P. Santos Jr., a National Artist of the Philippines.
