= Poseidon (disambiguation) =

Poseidon (Greek: Ποσειδων) is the god of the sea in ancient Greek mythology.

Poseidon may also refer to:

== People ==
- Posidonius, ancient Greek astronomer and geographer

=== Fictional characters ===
- Poseidon (Saint Seiya), manga deity character based on the Greek god
- Poseidon (DC Comics), a deity character based on the Greek god
- Jacob Anton Ness, a fictional character from Prison Break known as "Poseidon"
- Poseidon "Postie" Paterson, a fictional character from the Selby novel series

== Places ==
- Poseidon Ocean, an ocean that once existed during the Mesoproterozoic
- Poseidon Pass, a pass on the Antarctic Peninsula
- Poseidon Peak, a mountain in New Zealand
- Poseidon Pond, a pond in Antarctica

=== In space ===
- 4341 Poseidon, an asteroid
- Poseidon, an obsolete name for Pasiphae, a moon of the planet Jupiter

== Art, entertainment, and media ==
=== Film ===
- The Poseidon Adventure (1972 film), a 1972 film based on Paul Gallico's novel
  - Beyond the Poseidon Adventure, a 1979 sequel to the first film, based on a second book by Paul Gallico that had been commissioned by the film makers
- The Poseidon Adventure (2005 film), a 2005 television film loosely based on Paul Gallico's first novel, as well as the first film
- Poseidon (film), a 2006 film based on Paul Gallico's first novel as well as the first film
- USS Poseidon: Phantom Below, a 2006 film

=== Literature ===
- "Poseidon" (short story) by Franz Kafka
- The Poseidon Adventure (novel), a 1969 novel by Paul Gallico.

=== Music ===
- Poseidon (album), by French band Dagoba
- Poseidon (EP), by The Mavis's
- In the Wake of Poseidon, an album by British band King Crimson
- Poseidon (Keep me Safe), a 2017 song by Dhani Harrison from In Parallel

=== Other A&E properties ===
- Poseidon (roller coaster), a water roller coaster in Germany
- Poseidon: Master of Atlantis, a videogame expansion pack
- WinBack 2: Project Poseidon, a third-person shooter videogame
- Poseidon (TV series), 2011 South Korean drama
- Poseidon (Justifiers), 1989 adventure for the role-playing game Justifiers

=== Fictional elements ===
- Poseidon Energy, an energy company in the Fallout series

== Sports ==
- Poseidon (horse), an Australian Thoroughbred
- Pärnu JK Poseidon, Parnu, Estonia; a soccer team
- Poseidon Neon Poron, Neon Poron, Greece; a soccer team

== Groups, organizations, companies ==
- Poseidon Diving Systems, Swedish manufacturer of underwater diving equipment
- Poseidon Expeditions, an expedition cruise tour operator
- Poseidon Press, a defunct American publishing house
- Poseidon Society, a funerary company

== Transportation and vehicles ==
- Boeing P-8 Poseidon, a U.S. made anti-submarine military aircraft
- TOPEX/Poseidon, an oceanographic satellite and space mission
- UGM-73 Poseidon, a U.S. Navy nuclear ballistic missile system
- Poseidon, Russian nuclear-powered nuclear-armed unmanned underwater vehicle

=== Ships ===
- Poseidon (ship name)
- HMS Poseidon (P99), a Royal Navy Parthian-class submarine launched in 1929 and sunk in 1931
- Poseidon (A-12), a Spanish Navy salvage and support vessel for submarines
- BN Poseidon was 1951–1959 a coastal tanker launched in 1942 as Empire Faun
- SS Poseidon was 1968–1969 a steam cargo ship launched in 1941 as Empire Ballard
- ST Poseidon was 1973–1976 a steam tug launched in 1941 as Empire Fir
- USS Poseidon (ARL-12), a U.S. Navy Achelous-class repair ship launched in 1944 and sold in 1961
- Greek submarine Poseidon (S-78), a Gato-class submarine
- Poseidon-class submarine, a Greek submarine class

== Computing and technology ==
- PoSeidon (malware), a virus targeting point-of-sale computer systems
- Poseidon drowning detection system, computer aided swimming pool safety equipment
- Poseidon Linux, an operating system
- Poseidon, a specific implementation of the ISO 8583 electronic payment protocol
- Poseidon, a series of space-based radar altimeters
  - Poseidon-1, a CNES-built Ku-band radar altimeter aboard TOPEX/Poseidon oceanographic satellite
  - Poseidon-2, a radar altimeter on board the Jason-1 oceanographic satellite
  - Poseidon-3, a radar altimeter on board the OSTM/Jason-2 oceanographic satellite
  - Poseidon-3B, a radar altimeter on board the Jason-3 oceanographic satellite

== Other uses ==
- Poseidon bubble, an Australian stock market bubble
- Poseidon, the Boardwalk Hall Auditorium Organ in Atlantic City, New Jersey
- Poseidon (species), species with the specifier poseidon

== See also ==
- The Poseidon Adventure (disambiguation)
- Poseidonia (disambiguation)
- Posidonia (disambiguation)
