= Elizabeth Rogers =

American actress (1934–2004)

- Elizabeth Rogers as Lt. Palmer in Star Trek
- Born: Betty Jayne Rogers; May 18, 1934; Austin, Texas, U.S.
- Died: November 6, 2004 (aged 70); Tarzana, California, U.S.
- Occupations: Actress and Producer
- Years active: 1965–1986
- Spouse: Erik L. Nelson (m. 1968)
- Children: 1

Elizabeth Rogers (born Betty Jayne Rogers, May 18, 1934 – November 6, 2004) was an American actress.

== Life and career ==
Born in Austin, Texas, she played minor characters in 37 episodes of a dozen different primetime network series, including Little House on the Prairie, Bewitched, Gunsmoke, The Waltons, Marcus Welby, M.D., Dragnet 1966, Mannix, Dragnet 1967, Bonanza, The Time Tunnel, Land of the Giants, Dr. Kildare, Gunsmoke, and Slattery's People.

In the original Star Trek television series, she portrayed Lt. Palmer, a substitute communications officer, in two episodes: "The Doomsday Machine" (1967) and "The Way to Eden" (1969). For The Doomsday Machine, Rogers was brought in at the last minute after Nichelle Nichols (the series regular as communications officer Lt. Uhura) informed the producers that she was flying to New York for a concert performance. As Nichols had no standard contract, she was legally free to do so, but Rogers' appearance was intended to convince her to keep herself available for Star Trek. Rogers said in a later interview, "I got the part when Uhura [Nichols] had a singing engagement. I was used as an instant 'threat' replacement." (Note: Only one other actress, Barbara Baldavin, ever served as a substitute, credited, communications officer for Uhura [Nichols], playing Lt. Lisa in the final episode of the series, "Turnabout Intruder".)

During the 1970s, she also appeared in a string of Irwin Allen–produced films, including The Poseidon Adventure (1972) and The Towering Inferno (1974). She was a personal friend of Allen and his wife, Sheila Matthews Allen, and was married to actor Erik Nelson (also a regular in Irwin Allen films) in the backyard of Allen's home. Her other film appearances included Bittersweet Love (1976), The Van (1977), Grand Theft Auto (1977), and An Officer and a Gentleman (1982) as David Keith's mother.

== Death ==
She died from multiple strokes and lung cancer on November 6, 2004, in Tarzana, California at the age of 70.

== Filmography ==
Year	Title	Role	Notes
1965	Slattery's People	Betty Dyne	Episode: "The Hero"
1965	Dr. Kildare	Miss Trilling	2 episodes
1965, 1967	Bonanza	Ellie Blackwell / Allie Lou	2 episodes
1966	The Time Tunnel	Mrs. Reynerson	Episode: "The Alamo"
1966	Gunsmoke	Hostage / Mrs. Davis	2 episodes
1967	Star Trek	Lt. Palmer	S2:E6, "The Doomsday Machine"
1968	Dragnet 1967	Mrs. Bradley	Episode: "The Little Victim"
1969	Star Trek	Lt. Palmer	S3:E20, "The Way to Eden"
1969	Mannix	Records Clerk	Episode: "Shadow of a Man"
1969	Dragnet 1966	Eve Sorenson	TV movie
1969	Land of the Giants	Secretary	Episode: "Sabotage"
1970	Marcus Welby, M.D.	Woman Executive	Episode: "Go Get 'Em, Tiger"
1971	Bewitched	Duchess	Episode: "The Ghost Who Made a Spectre of Himself"
1972	Something Evil	Party Guest	TV movie
1972	The Poseidon Adventure	Woman Next to Mr. Tinkham	Uncredited
1974	The Towering Inferno	Lady in Buoy	
1975	Adventures of the Queen	Irene McKay	TV movie
1975	The Waltons	Nurse Smith	Episode: "The Nurse"
1976	Bittersweet Love	Joan	
1976	Flood!	Nancy Lowman	TV movie
1977	The Van	Mrs. Eastman	
1977	A Sensitive, Passionate Man	Sophie	TV movie
1977	Grand Theft Auto	Priscilla Powers	
1978	Lacy and the Mississippi Queen	Madam Josephine	TV movie
1978	The Swarm	Woman Scientist	(extended version only)
1979	Hanging by a Thread	Maggie Porter	TV movie
1979	Goldie and the Boxer	First matron	TV movie
1981	Little House on the Prairie	Mrs. Miles	Episode: "For the Love of Nancy"
1982	An Officer and a Gentleman	Betty Worley	
1983	The Night the Bridge Fell Down		TV movie
1984	The Yellow Rose	Tess Anderson	Episode: "The Far Side of Fear"
1986	Outrage!	Stella Smith	TV movie, (final film role)
