= The Poseidon Adventure =

The Poseidon Adventure may refer to:

- The Poseidon Adventure (novel), a 1969 adventure novel by Paul Gallico
- The Poseidon Adventure (1972 film), an American adaptation of the novel, directed by Ronald Neame
- The Poseidon Adventure (2005 film), an American television adaptation, directed by John Putch
