= Paul Zastupnevich =

American actor

- Born: December 24, 1921; Homestead, Pennsylvania
- Died: May 9, 1997 (aged 75); Rancho Mirage, California

Paul Zastupnevich (December 24, 1921 – May 9, 1997), known professionally and among colleagues as "Mr. Z," was an American costume designer, fashion designer, and actor, and a longtime assistant to producer-director Irwin Allen, active in film from 1959 to 1980. He was nominated for the Academy Award for Best Costume Design for three films produced by Allen: The Poseidon Adventure (1972), The Swarm (1978), and When Time Ran Out (1980).

== Early life ==
Zastupnevich was born on December 24, 1921, in Homestead, Pennsylvania, the son of Dimitrey Zastupnevich and Mary Zastupnevich, and earned a degree in fashion design. His early career was spent acting in stage productions, including The Man Who Came to Dinner (as Banjo), David Copperfield (as Mr. Dick), The Madwoman of Chaillot (as the French Sgt. of Police), Anastasia (as Petrovin), and The Solid Gold Cadillac (as Gillie), before designing costumes for many of the same productions.

== Career ==
Zastupnevich worked closely with producer-director Irwin Allen from 1959 to 1980, designing costumes for The Big Circus (1959), The Lost World (1960), Voyage to the Bottom of the Sea (1961), Five Weeks in a Balloon (1962), Lost in Space (1966–1968), Land of the Giants (1968–1969), The Poseidon Adventure (1972), The Towering Inferno (1974), Viva Knievel! (1977), The Swarm (1978), Beyond the Poseidon Adventure (1979), and When Time Ran Out (1980). In addition to costume design, he appeared on screen in several Allen productions, including five episodes of Voyage to the Bottom of the Sea (1964–1965) and three episodes of Lost in Space (1965–1967).

He received three Academy Award nominations for Best Costume Design and a 1986 Emmy Award nomination for Outstanding Costume Design for a Variety or Music Program for Alice in Wonderland. He also won a Costume Designers Guild Award for Best Costumed Television Series for Lost in Space (1967).

== Personal life ==
Zastupnevich ran his own boutique, "The House of Z," in Pasadena, California, with his sister, Olga (Zastupnevich) Yurkew, for whom he also designed clothing for actresses. The siblings later relocated together to the Palm Desert area of the Coachella Valley in Southern California, eventually settling in Rancho Mirage, California where Zastupnevich was living by 1996. Olga Yurkew later resided in Studio City, California with her daughter and granddaughter, until her death on March 8, 2016.

Zastupnevich's niece, Marinka Yurkew (later Marinka Sjoberg), was given away in marriage by him on July 12, 1987, at St. Innocent Orthodox Church in Tarzana, California; he also designed her wedding gown. Little known fact, Zastupnevich painted the cupola at St. Innocent’s not surprising considering he was known to be accomplished artist and draftsmen as well.

Contemporary newspaper coverage identified the bride as "the daughter of Olga Yurkew" and Zastupnevich as "her uncle." A bridal shower ahead of the ceremony was held at Olga Yurkew's Palm Desert home. The family relationship is further documented in a 1969 obituary for Zastupnevich's father, Dimitrey Zastupnevich, which lists his survivors as his wife Mary, son Paul Zastupnevich, daughter Olga Yurkew, and granddaughter.

Sjoberg later co-founded Indigo Bleu Business Management, a California limited liability company formed in 2018, where she is listed as a managing member. According to the company's own materials, she also holds a position at Perspectiv.Works, a business consulting firm.

In 1994, Zastupnevich was the special guest of honor at an Irwin Allen convention in England, where he gave several talks on his work with Allen, and he became honorary president of the Irwin Allen News Network the same year.

== Death ==
Zastupnevich died on May 9, 1997, at home in Rancho Mirage CA, and is buried at Forest Lawn Memorial Park (Hollywood Hills).

== Awards ==
Year	Award	Result	Category	Film
1973	Academy Awards	Nominated	Best Costume Design	The Poseidon Adventure
1979	Academy Awards	Nominated	Best Costume Design	The Swarm
1981	Academy Awards	Nominated	Best Costume Design	When Time Ran Out
1986	Emmy Award	Nominated	Outstanding Costume Design for a Variety or Music Program	Alice in Wonderland

== Selected filmography ==
=== Actor ===
- Voyage to the Bottom of the Seas (5 episodes, 1964–1965)
- Lost in Space (3 episodes, 1965–1967)

=== Costume designer ===
- The Big Circus (1959)
- The Lost World (1960)
- Voyage to the Bottom of the Sea (1961)
- Five Weeks in a Balloon (film) (1962)
- Lost in Space (51 episodes, 1966–1968)
- Land of the Giants (3 episodes, 1968–1969)
- The Poseidon Adventure (1972)
- The Towering Inferno (1974)
- Viva Knievel! (1977)
- The Swarm (1978)
- Beyond the Poseidon Adventure (1979)
- When Time Ran Out (1980)
- Alice in Wonderland (1985)

=== Stage ===
- The Man who came to Dinner (as Banjo)
- David Copperfield (as Mr Dick)
- The Madwoman of Chaillot (as French Sgt. of Police)
- Plain and Fancy (Jolly Jacob Yoder)
- Blind Alley (as young man)
- Affairs of State
- Hazel Kirke
- Oklahoma
- Separate Rooms
- Meet the Wife
- Boy Meets Girl
- St. Joan
- Nathan the Wise
- Plain and Fancy
- Anastasia (as Petrovin)
- Solid Gold Cadillac (as Gillie)

== Award nominations ==
Year	Award	Result	Category	Film
1973	Academy Awards	Nominated	Best Costume Design	The Poseidon Adventure
1979	Academy Awards	Nominated	Best Costume Design	The Swarm
1981	Academy Awards	Nominated	Best Costume Design	When Time Ran Out
1986	Emmy Award	Nominated	Outstanding Costume Design for a Variety or Music Program	Alice in Wonderland
