= USS Poseidon =

USS Poseidon may refer to:

- USS Poseidon: Phantom Below, a 2005 film
- USS Poseidon (ARL-12), an Achelous-class repair ship of the United States Navy that served during World War II

== See also ==
- Poseidon (ship name)
