= List of ships named Poseidon =

Poseidon has been the name of a number of ships, both real and in fiction.

== Ships ==
- SS Poseidon was 1968–1969 the name of a steam cargo ship built in 1941 for the British Government and originally named Empire Ballard.
- BN Poseidon was 1951–1959 the name of a coastal tanker launched in 1942 as Empire Faun
- ST Poseidon was 1973–1976 the name of a steam tugboat built in 1941 for the British Government and originally named Empire Fir.
- HMS Poseidon was a Royal Navy Parthian-class submarine, launched in 1929 and sunk in 1931.
- USS Poseidon (ARL-12) was a United States Navy Achelous-class repair ship, built in 1944 and sold off in 1961.
- Greek submarine Poseidon (S-78), a Gato-class submarine
- KBV 001 Poseidon (IMO 9380441), a Swedish Coast Guard vessel

== In fiction ==
- SS Poseidon, the namesake ship in the novel The Poseidon Adventure and its adaptations

== See also ==
- Poseidon-class submarine, a Greek submarine class
- Poseidon (disambiguation)
