= When Time Ran Out =

1980 film by James Goldstone

When Time Ran Out...
- Theatrical release poster
- Directed by: James Goldstone
- Written by: Carl Foreman; Stirling Silliphant
- Based on: The Day the World Ended by Gordon Thomas
- Produced by: Irwin Allen
- Starring: Paul Newman; Jacqueline Bisset; William Holden; Edward Albert; Red Buttons; Barbara Carrera; Valentina Cortesa; Veronica Hamel; Alex Karras; Burgess Meredith; Ernest Borgnine; James Franciscus
- Cinematography: Fred J. Koenekamp
- Edited by: Edward Biery; Freeman A. Davies
- Music by: Lalo Schifrin
- Distributed by: Warner Bros. Pictures
- Release date: March 28, 1980
- Running time: 121 minutes
- Country: United States
- Language: English
- Budget: $20 million
- Box office: $3.8 million

When Time Ran Out... is a 1980 American disaster film directed by James Goldstone and starring Paul Newman, Jacqueline Bisset and William Holden. The supporting cast features James Franciscus, Ernest Borgnine, Red Buttons, Burgess Meredith, Valentina Cortese, Veronica Hamel, Pat Morita, Edward Albert, Alex Karras and Barbara Carrera.

Produced by Irwin Allen, the screenplay by Carl Foreman and Stirling Silliphant is loosely based on the 1969 novel The Day the World Ended by Gordon Thomas and Max Morgan-Witts detailing the factual 1902 volcanic eruption of Mount Pelée on Martinique, which killed 30,000 people in five minutes by pyroclastic flow.

It marked the second and final time Newman and Holden appeared in a film together following the box office triumph of The Towering Inferno six years earlier, as well as reuniting Borgnine and Buttons from The Poseidon Adventure. When Time Ran Out..., however, was a commercial flop and Allen's last theatrical release and is often regarded as the final 1970s era disaster film. The film was a critical and commercial disappointment. Paul Zastupnevich's work on the film was recognized by a nomination for the Academy Award for Best Costume Design.

== Plot ==
Shelby Gilmore, an international hotel magnate who owns the Kalaleu Gilmore, a resort hotel on a Pacific island, wants desperately to marry his secretary, Kay Kirby and proposes to her under the impression that she'll become his seventh wife. Kay is in love with Hank Anderson, an oil rigger whose scientists are warning him that the island's active volcano, Mauna Nui, is about to erupt.

Shelby's partner is Bob Spangler, who inherited the island from his father, a sugar cane baron. Spangler is determined to diversify into tourism and assures hotel guests that the threat of the volcano is exaggerated. Spangler married Shelby's goddaughter Nikki to help get the Kalaleu Gilmore built, but is cheating on her with Iolani, an executive at the hotel. Iolani is engaged to Brian, the hotel's general manager.

Guests at the hotel include: a fugitive bond thief, Francis Fendly; the New York City cop tailing him, Tom Conti; and Rene and Rose Valdez, retired circus tightrope walkers.

Hank's oil well comes in but Hank is concerned about high levels of subterranean pressure. He and Spangler descend into the volcano in a special observation pod, and are almost killed when lava erupts unexpectedly.

Hank and Kay go for a picnic on the beach. While there, the volcano erupts and they flee by his helicopter. Hank's workers are killed by a tsunami generated by Mauna Nui's eruption. Sam takes Mona and two of his "bar girls," Delores and Marsha, and escapes by car, while Hank and Kay rescue in the helicopter Nikki and some others at a horse farm. At the hotel, guests panic and steal the helicopter, which is destroyed. Hank offers to take the guests to safety on the other side of the island, but Spangler insists the hotel is safe and most refuse. The volcano spews fireballs, which land at the hotel, and Conti is burned and blinded by one of them, to Fendly's horror.

Hank and Kay leave the hotel with Shelby, Brian, Rene and Rose, Fendly and Conti, Sam, Mona and the girls, plus a few more. At the hotel, Nikki stumbles upon Spangler's affair with Iolani, but now it is too late for her to follow the others.

Vehicles carrying the survivors manage to travel as far as a mountainside gorge, where the road has fallen away. Everyone must cross the gorge on foot, and one of the survivors falls and dies. Conti is guided by Fendly, and the two become friends. From there, the party comes upon a rickety wooden bridge over a river of molten lava. Hank crosses first to see if it is safe. The others go in pairs. Two native children, whose father died crossing the gorge, are afraid and run away. Rose, who had stopped to rest with Rene because of her weak heart, dies after telling her husband to find the children.

After an explosion beneath the bridge causes Sam and Marsha to fall to their deaths into the lava, Rene hoists a child onto his back and recreates his old tightrope act to get the child safely across. Hank guides the second child to safety after almost falling himself. The survivors take refuge in a cavern, during which time large fireballs streak across the sky. A huge fireball arcs directly towards the hotel; destroying it and killing Spangler, Nikki, Iolani and all who chose to stay. The next morning, the survivors emerge from the cave, and walk down the other side of the island, to the waiting rescue ships.

== Cast ==
- Paul Newman as Hank Anderson
- Jacqueline Bisset as Kay Kirby
- William Holden as Shelby Gilmore
- Edward Albert as Brian
- Red Buttons as Francis Fendly
- Barbara Carrera as Iolani
- Valentina Cortese (as Valentina Cortesa) as Rose Valdez
- Veronica Hamel as Nikki Spangler
- Alex Karras as "Tiny" Baker
- Burgess Meredith as Rene Valdez
- Ernest Borgnine as Tom Conti
- James Franciscus as Bob Spangler
- John Considine as Webster
- Sheila Allen as Mona
- Pat Morita as Sam
- Lonny Chapman as Kelly
- Sandy Kenyon as Henderson
- Ava Readdy as Delores
- Glynn Rubin as Marsha
- Steven Marlo as Co-Pilot

== Production ==
=== Development ===
The Day the World Ended, by English television writers Gordon Thomas and Max Morgan-Witts, was a 1969 non-fiction account of the disastrous eruption of Mount Pelée in Martinique in 1902, which killed 30,000 people. It was called "literally impossible to put down" by The New York Times. Film rights were bought by Irwin Allen. In 1975, Allen was riding high on the success of The Poseidon Adventure and The Towering Inferno. He announced he would make a film of Day the World Ended along with Poseidon II and Circus. He announced he had signed a two-picture deal with Warner Bros. Pictures, but would still make those three films for Fox.

Allen began to prepare The Swarm but also started pre-production on Day in Hawaii. Filming was to start in March 1976 with a view to the film being ready by Christmas 1976. Then Alan Ladd Jr., head of Fox, decided that the disaster cycle had peaked and decided not to finance the films. Allen took his projects to Warner Bros.

Allen hired Carl Foreman to write the script "for more money than I'd ever heard of before." By this time the project was no longer a historical dramatization of the Mount Pelée eruption, but had become a contemporary, fictional account of a resort hotel built near an active volcano.

Allen raised his biggest budget to date for the film, $20 million. Warner Bros. told Allen that the film could have a large budget on one condition: that Allen himself not direct it. Several of the actors who appeared in the movie, including Paul Newman and Ernest Borgnine, didn't like the script but signed on because they were contractually bound to doing one last movie with Allen, and wanted to get their obligations over with.

=== Shooting ===
Filming started 8 February 1979 on the Big Island of Hawaiʻi. The primary location was the Kona Surf Resort (today known as the Outrigger Kona Resort and Spa), which served as the film's fictional Kalaleu Gilmore Hotel. The exterior scenes of Bob Spangler walking on the floor of the volcano were shot at both the Kilauea Iki crater, and the Halemaʻumaʻu Crater (which was radically altered during the April, 2018 eruption). The scenes of the convoy of vehicles escaping were largely filmed on Old Mamalahoa highway, near the Hawai'i Tropical Botanical Garden. The film was rife with production problems. While it was initially budgeted at $20,000,000, Warner Bros. cut the budget drastically halfway through the production, compromising the remaining filming, and notably, the critical special effects work. Legendary special effects technician L.B. Abbott, who had helmed effects for Allen's previous box office hits, The Poseidon Adventure and The Towering Inferno, had very little budget left to produce the effects, resulting in sub-standard results (a more elaborate volcano model and matte paintings were planned, but scrapped due to budget, as was a miniature of the hotel complex which was to be exploded for the finale). During filming, Holden, who was ill and battling alcoholism, was sidelined by director Goldstone for being under the influence of alcohol, and presenting a danger to himself and others during a complicated stunt sequence involving a bridge. Newman, contractually obliged to do another Allen film after Inferno, was unenthusiastic about appearing. In a 1998 interview with Larry King, when asked if he ever regretted making any film, Newman bitterly responded "that volcano movie." However, it is believed his salary for this film was used to start up his Newman's Own company.

== Release and reception ==
When Time Ran Out... was released on March 28, 1980, and it was panned by critics. Gene Siskel and Roger Ebert selected the film as one of their "dogs of the year" in a 1980 episode of Sneak Previews.

On the review aggregator website Rotten Tomatoes, 0% of 8 critics' reviews are positive, with an average rating of 2.80/10. On Metacritic, it has a 25/100 based on 5 critics, indicating "generally unfavorable reviews.

The film performed poorly at the box office, grossing only $3,763,988 against a $20 million budget. Film critic Leonard Maltin's annual publication of capsule film reviews dubbed the film "'When Ideas Ran Out' or 'The Blubbering Inferno.'" A story in TV Guide observed that "with cheesy special effects (even the volcano isn't convincing, considering the film cost $20 million) and a hole-ridden script, this film offers precious little to like."

The film was nominated for an Academy Award for Best Costume Design.

== Alternate versions ==
Because the film performed badly at the US box office, Warner Brothers insisted on cuts for the international theatrical release, reducing it from 121 minutes down to 109 minutes in NTSC/104m 30s in PAL. All DVD releases of the film have been the shortened international version.

In 1986 and 1994, Warner Brothers Home Video released an extended version on VHS in the U.S. that was 141 minutes long. Deleted scenes and additional footage were restored when Earth's Final Fury (the film's TV title) debuted on network television. It was released with the notice 'EXPANDED VIDEO EDITION' on the box with some of the additional scenes retaining their sporadic "fade to black" commercial edits.

Material from the restored footage included more screen time for the love triangle between Franciscus, Carrera and Albert plus expanded Albert's role of Brian. In the longer version it is revealed that, unbeknownst to all except Spangler, Brian is his illegitimate younger half-brother and therefore entitled to a portion of their family's vast holdings. Scenes involving Karras' cockfighting exploits at Sam's and Mona's bar were also added. In the original theatrical release the cockfighting subplot is nearly gone.

The caravan sequence where trucks make their way through the island is trimmed in the theatrical version and the death of Cortese is not shown onscreen. It features scenes that didn't make it to the longer video edition: a humorous one where a winded Borgnine chases a jogging Buttons plus a longer introduction to the characters of Franciscus and Hamel. A precarious ledge scene is slightly longer (and employs a shot of the dead farmer at the bottom of the cavern), as are shots of the survivors hiking through the jungle.

In an effort to leave in the past the notoriety of its flopping at the box office, when it was finally cleared to air on TV more than four years later, the film was retitled Earth's Final Fury.
