= Fire! (1977 film) =

1977 television film by Earl Bellamy

- Genre: Action; Drama; Disaster
- Written by: Norman Katkov; Arthur Weiss
- Directed by: Earl Bellamy
- Starring: Ernest Borgnine; Vera Miles; Patty Duke Astin; Alex Cord; Donna Mills
- Music by: Richard LaSalle
- Country of origin: United States
- Original language: English

Production
- Executive producer: Irwin Allen
- Producer: Irwin Allen
- Production locations: Silverton, Oregon; Yamhill, Oregon
- Cinematography: Dennis Dalzell
- Editor: Bill Brame
- Running time: 100 minutes
- Production companies: Irwin Allen Productions; Warner Bros. Television

Original release
- Network: NBC
- Release: May 8, 1977

Fire! is a 1977 American made-for-television action-drama disaster film produced by Irwin Allen starring Ernest Borgnine, Vera Miles, Patty Duke Astin, Alex Cord, Donna Mills, Lloyd Nolan, Neville Brand, Ty Hardin and Erik Estrada. The film premiered on NBC on May 8, 1977. It was directed by Earl Bellamy, who directed another made-for-TV disaster film one year before titled Flood!.

== Plot ==
Convict Larry Durant escapes from an Oregon road gang, and starts a fire in a forest, which goes out of control and threatens to destroy a small mountain community. Involved are a lumber mill owner, Sam Brisbane; Martha Wagner, the widowed operator of a forest lodge; teacher, Harriet Malone, who is on a class outing; a country doctor, Doc Bennett, and a young couple, Doctors Alex and Peggy Wilson, whose shaky marriage is healed when battling the blaze brings out their better natures.

== Cast ==
- Ernest Borgnine as Sam Brisbane
- Vera Miles as Martha Wagner
- Patty Duke Astin as Dr. Peggy Wilson
- Alex Cord as Dr. Alex Wilson
- Donna Mills as Harriett Malone
- Lloyd Nolan as Doc Bennett
- Neville Brand as Larry Durant
- Ty Hardin as Walt Fleming
- Gene Evans as Dan Harter
- Erik Estrada as Frank
- Michelle Stacy as Judy

== Production ==
The film was directed in the cities of Silverton and Yamhill, in Oregon.

== Release ==
Fire! premiered on May 8, 1977 on NBC on two-hours length; it was later cut to ninety minutes and rerun in tandem with another TV disaster movie, Flood!, also produced by Irwin Allen.

The New York Times called it "mindless escapism."

== Titles around the world ==
- Det flammande helvevet (Sweden)
- El bosque en llamas (Spain)
- Horizons en flammes (France)
- Il colosso di fuoco (Italy)
- Horizont in Flammen (West Germany)
- Krwawe pieklo (Poland)
- Ti nyhta pou oi ouranoi epiasan fotia (Greece)
- Tuhoavat liekit (Finland)
