= Paul Gallico =

American writer and journalist (1897–1976)

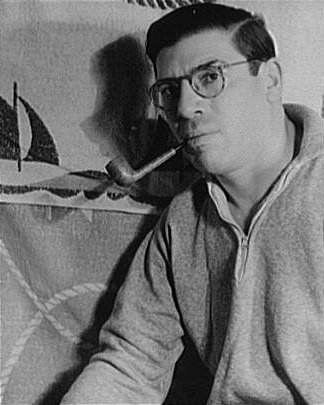
- Gallico photographed by Carl Van Vechten, 1937
- Born: July 26, 1897; New York City, New York, U.S.
- Died: July 15, 1976 (aged 78); Monaco or Antibes, France
- Occupations: Novelist; short story; sports writer
- Spouses: Alva Thoits Taylor (m. 1921; div. 1934) Elaine St. Johns (m. 1935; div. 1936) Pauline Gariboldi (m. 1939; div. 1954) Virginia von Falz-Fein (m. 1963)
- Children: 2

Signature
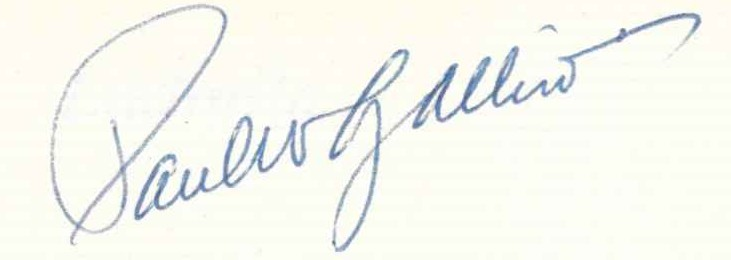

Paul William Gallico (July 26, 1897 – July 15, 1976) was an American novelist and short story and sports writer. Many of his works were adapted for motion pictures. He is perhaps best remembered for The Snow Goose, his most critically successful book, for the novel The Poseidon Adventure, primarily through the 1972 film adaptation, and for four novels about the beloved character of Mrs. Harris.

== Early life and career ==
Gallico was born in New York City in 1897. His father was the Italian concert pianist, composer and music teacher Paolo Gallico (Trieste, May 13, 1868 – New York, July 6, 1955), and his mother, Hortense Erlich, came from Austria; they had emigrated to New York in 1895. Gallico's graduation from Columbia University was delayed to 1921, having served a year and a half in the United States Army during World War I. He first achieved notice in the 1920s as a sportswriter, sports columnist, and sports editor of the New York Daily News.

While modern summaries frequently omit his family's financial realities, his parents struggled deeply to establish economic stability as immigrant musicians in late-19th-century Manhattan. Raised in a working-class household, Gallico financed his own education at Columbia University by working grueling manual labor jobs, notably as a longshoreman on the New York docks, a gym instructor, and a translator. His graduation was delayed until 1921 due to his enlistment in the United States Army during World War I, where he served for a year and a half as a gunner. He first gained recognition in the 1920s as a sportswriter, sports columnist, and sports editor for the New York Daily News.

In 1937, in Gallico's "Farewell to Sport" he stated, "For all her occasional beauty and unquestioned courage, there has always been something faintly ridiculous about the big-time lady athletes." In the same book, Gallico later explained why he thinks Jewish people are drawn to and good at basketball, "The game places a premium on an alert, scheming mind, flashy trickiness, artful dodging and general smart aleckness."

Gallico's career was launched by an interview with boxer Jack Dempsey in which he asked Dempsey to spar with him. Gallico described how it felt to be knocked out by the heavyweight champion. He followed up with accounts of catching Dizzy Dean's fastball and golfing with Bobby Jones. He became one of the highest-paid sportswriters in America. His book, Lou Gehrig: Pride of the Yankees (1941) was adapted into the sports movie The Pride of the Yankees (1942), starring Gary Cooper and Teresa Wright.

== Career as a fiction writer ==
In the late 1930s, he abandoned sports writing for fiction, first writing an essay about this decision entitled "Farewell to Sport" (published in an anthology of his sports writing, also titled Farewell to Sport (1938)), and became a successful writer of short stories for magazines, many appearing in the then-premier fiction outlet, The Saturday Evening Post. His novella The Snow Goose and other works are expanded versions of his magazine stories.

Gallico once confessed to New York magazine: "I'm a rotten novelist. I'm not even literary. I just like to tell stories and all my books tell stories.... If I had lived 2,000 years ago I'd be going around to caves, and I'd say, 'Can I come in? I'm hungry. I'd like some supper. In exchange, I'll tell you a story. Once upon a time there were two apes.' And I'd tell them a story about two cavemen."

In 1939, Gallico published The Adventures of Hiram Holliday, known for its later television adaptation with Wally Cox. It depicts the comic adventures of a modern American knight-errant visiting Europe on the verge of World War II and waging a single-handed, quixotic struggle against the Nazis in various countries. Gallico's Austrian background is evident in the book's strong Habsburg Monarchist theme. (The protagonist saves an Austrian princess, wins her love and takes charge of her young son – who, the book hints, is fated to become the new Habsburg Emperor once the Nazis are driven out of Austria.)

The Snow Goose was published in 1941 in The Saturday Evening Post and won the O. Henry Award for short stories in 1941. Critic Robert van Gelder called it "perhaps the most sentimental story that ever has achieved the dignity of a Borzoi [prestige imprint of publisher Knopf] imprint. It is a timeless legend that makes use of every timeless appeal that could be crowded into it." A public library puts it on a list of "tearjerkers". Gallico made no apologies, saying that "in the contest between sentiment and 'slime,' 'sentiment' remains so far out in front, as it always has and always will among ordinary humans that the calamity-howlers and porn merchants have to increase the decibels of their lamentations, the hideousness of their violence and the mountainous piles of their filth to keep in the race at all."

On December 25, 1949, Gallico's short story "'Twas the Night Before Christmas" was dramatized as Attraction 66 of the NBC radio series Radio City Playhouse. It tells the humorous tale of a New York newspaper reporter and a photographer sent on a Christmas Eve wild goose chase by their publisher's wife for two goats harnessed to a little red wagon, which she intends to give her nephews for Christmas. During a night-long search fueled by a few drinks along the way, the reporter and photographer run across the evening's most dramatic news stories, which they must supposedly ignore in favor of the chore set out by their publisher's wife. The radio dramatization remains very popular with Old Time Radio fans and is featured each year on Sirius XM Radio Classics.

His short story "The Man Who Hated People" was reworked into an unpublished short story "The Seven Souls of Clement O'Reilly", adapted into the movie Lili (1953) and later staged as the musical Carnival! (1961). The film Lili is a poignant, whimsical fairy tale, the story of an orphaned waif, a naïve young woman whose fate is thrown in with that of a traveling carnival and its performers, a lothario magician and an embittered puppeteer. In 1954, Gallico published the novella The Love of Seven Dolls, based on "The Man Who Hated People". The versions, while differing, share a core theme surrounding the girl and the puppeteer. The puppeteer, communicating with Lili through his puppets as a surrogate voice, develops a vehicle whereby each of them can freely express their inner pain and anguished emotions.

In the 1950s, Gallico spent time in Liechtenstein, where he wrote Ludmila, the retelling of a local legend.

His novel Mrs. 'Arris Goes to Paris (1958) was a bestseller, and became the first of four books about the lovable charwoman Mrs. Harris. The character was said by The New York Times to be "perhaps Mr. Gallico's most beloved creation". Negotiations for film rights began as early as 1960 when he was resident in Salcombe. It was produced as a TV movie with Angela Lansbury in 1992.

During his time in Salcombe, Gallico serialised an account of the sinking of the MV Princess Victoria, the ferry that plied between Larne and Stranraer, an event which left only 44 out of 179 surviving. It was his habit, at this time, to wander in his garden dictating to his assistant Mel Menzies, who then typed the manuscript in the evening, ready for inclusion in the newspaper.

The Silent Miaow (1964) purports to be a guide written by a cat, "translated from the feline", on how to obtain, captivate, and dominate a human family. Illustrated with photographs by Suzanne Szasz, it is considered a classic by cat lovers. Other Gallico cat books include Jennie (1950) (American title The Abandoned), Thomasina, the Cat Who Thought She Was God (1957), filmed in 1964 by the Walt Disney Studios as The Three Lives of Thomasina (which was very popular in the former USSR in the early 1990s, inspiring the Russian remake Bezumnaya Lori), and Honorable Cat (1972), a book of poetry and essays about cats.

Gallico's 1969 book The Poseidon Adventure, about a group of passengers attempting to escape from a capsized ocean liner, attracted little attention at the time. The New York Times gave it a one-paragraph review, noting that "Mr. Gallico collects a Grand Hotel (a reference to the 1930 Vicki Baum novel) full of shipboard dossiers. These interlocking histories may be damp with sentimentality as well as brine—but the author's skill as a storyteller invests them with enough suspense to last the desperate journey." In contrast, Irwin Allen's motion picture adaptation of Gallico's book instantly became a hit. In his article "What Makes 'Poseidon' Fun?", reviewer Vincent Canby coined the term "ark movie" for the genre including Airport, The High and the Mighty, A Night to Remember, and Titanic (the 1953 movie). He wrote that "'The Poseidon Adventure' puts the Ark Movie back where God intended it to be, in the water. Not flying around in the air on one engine or with a hole in its side." The movie was enormously successful, part of a decade of disaster films, and remains a cult classic.

In his New York Times obituary, Molly Ivins said that "to say that Mr. Gallico was prolific hardly begins to describe his output." He wrote 41 books and numerous short stories, 20 theatrical movies, 12 TV movies, and had a TV series based on his Hiram Holliday short stories.

== Later life ==
On resigning from the Daily News to become a full-time fiction writer, Gallico moved from New York to the town of Salcombe in Devon, England. Later he lived in different regions of the world, including other parts of England, Mexico, as well as Liechtenstein and Monaco. He spent the last part of his life in Antibes, France, and was buried there after his death from a heart attack in 1976, aged 78, which is variously reported to have happened in Antibes or Monaco.

In 1955, Gallico took an automobile tour of the United States, traveling some 10,000 miles, sponsored by Reader's Digest. He wrote that "it had been almost twenty years since I had traveled extensively through my own country and the changes brought about by two decades would thus stand out." Several stories resulted.

== Popular culture ==
In 2000, J. K. Rowling declared that Gallico's 1968 Manxmouse was one of her favorite childhood books. The boggarts appearing in Rowling's Harry Potter books closely resemble Manxmouse's "clutterbumph", which takes the form of whatever the viewer fears the most. Manxmouse was illustrated by Anne and Janet Grahame-Johnstone, who also illustrated The Hundred and One Dalmatians by Dodie Smith. The Japanese animation studio Nippon Animation adapted this tale into a feature-length anime film in 1979, directed by Hiroshi Saito. The anime, titled Tondemo Nezumi Daikatsuyaku: Manxmouse (Manxmouse's Great Activity) in Japanese, was dubbed into English in the 1980s, broadcast on Nickelodeon, and released on video by Celebrity Home Entertainment.

The television series The Adventures of Hiram Holliday (starring Wally Cox) was adapted from a series of Gallico's stories about a newspaper proofreader who had many adventures dealing with Nazis and spies in Europe on the eve of World War II.

In Fredric Brown's science-fiction novel What Mad Universe, a magazine editor from our own world is accidentally sent to a parallel Earth significantly different from ours; in this parallel world, the editor reads a biography written of a dashing space hero, a figure central to the novel's narrative, which is supposedly written by Paul Gallico.

In 1975, the British progressive rock band Camel released an album of work based on Gallico's The Snow Goose. Although the author was initially opposed to the album's release, legal action was evaded on the condition that the band used the words "Music Inspired by The Snow Goose" on the album's cover.

In 2005, a televised disaster film titled The Poseidon Adventure, which was a remake of the movie inspired by Gallico's novel, was aired; the captain, played by Peter Weller, is named after Gallico.

== Bibliography ==
- Farewell to Sport (1938)
- The Adventures of Hiram Holliday (1939, U.S.: Adventures of Hiram Holliday)
- Who Killed My Buddy (1939)
- The Secret Front (1940, sequel to The Adventures of Hiram Holliday)
- The Snow Goose (1941)
- Golf Is a Friendly Game (1942)
- Lou Gehrig: Pride of the Yankees (1942)
- Selected Stories of Paul Gallico (1944)
- The Lonely (1947)
- Confessions of a Story Writer (1948)
- Jennie (1950) (U.S.: The Abandoned)
- The Small Miracle (1951)
- Trial by Terror (1952)
- Snowflake (1952)
- The Foolish Immortals (1953)
- Gallico, Paul (1953). "The savage beast in us". In Birmingham, Frederic A. (ed.). The girls from Esquire. London: Arthur Barker. pp. 249–255.
- Love of Seven Dolls (1954)
- Ludmila (1954)
- Thomasina, the Cat Who Thought She Was God (1957)
- Flowers for Mrs Harris (1958, U.S.: Mrs. 'Arris Goes to Paris)
- The Steadfast Man (1958, biography of St. Patrick)
- Too Many Ghosts (1959)
- The Hurricane Story (1960)
- Mrs Harris Goes to New York (1960, U.S.: Mrs. 'Arris Goes to New York)
- Confessions of a Story Teller (1961, U.S.: Further Confessions of a Story Writer)
- Scruffy (1962)
- Coronation (1962)
- The Picture Thieves (October 1962, Playboy magazine vol. 9, no. 10, p. 74, featuring the Zoo Gang)
- Love, Let Me Not Hunger (1963)
- The Day the Guinea-Pig Talked (1963)
- Three Stories (1964, U.S.: Three Legends)
- The Hand of Mary Constable (1964, sequel to Too Many Ghosts)
- The Silent Miaow (1964)
- The Day Jean-Pierre was Pignapped (1964)
- Mrs Harris, M.P. (1965, U.S.: Mrs. 'Arris Goes to Parliament)
- The Day Jean-Pierre Went Round the World (1965)
- The Golden People (1965)
- The Man Who Was Magic (1966)
- The Story of Silent Night (1967)
- The Revealing Eye (1967)
- Gallico Magic (1967)
- Manxmouse (1968)
- The Poseidon Adventure (1969)
- The Day Jean-Pierre Joined the Circus (1969)
- Matilda (1970)
- The Zoo Gang (1971)
- Honourable Cat (1972, U.S.: Honorable Cat)
- The Boy Who Invented the Bubble Gun (1974)
- Mrs Harris Goes to Moscow (1974, U.S.: Mrs. 'Arris Goes to Moscow)
- Miracle in the Wilderness (1975)
- Beyond the Poseidon Adventure (1978)
- The House That Wouldn't Go Away (1979)
- The Best of Paul Gallico (1988)
- Under the Clock (unpublished work by Paul and wife Pauline)

== Adaptations ==
Film

- 1942: Joe Smith, American
- 1942: Pride of the Yankees
- 1945: The Clock
- 1952: Assignment – Paris!
- 1953: Lili, based on The Love of Seven Dolls
- 1958: Merry Andrew, based on "The Romance of Henry Menafee"
- 1958: Ludmila
- 1964: The Three Lives of Thomasina, based on Thomasina: The Cat Who Thought She Was God (1957)
- 1971: The Snow Goose
- 1972: The Poseidon Adventure
- 1972: Honorable Cat
- 1978: Matilda
- 1979: Beyond the Poseidon Adventure
- 1991: Mad Lori (Russia), based on Thomasina
- 1992: Mrs. 'Arris Goes to Paris
- 2005: The Poseidon Adventure
- 2006: Poseidon
- 2022: Mrs. Harris Goes to Paris

Television

- 1956–1957: The Adventures of Hiram Holliday
- 1969: Daughter of the Mind, based on The Hand of Mary Constable
- 1974: The Zoo Gang
- 1978: A Fire in the Sky
- 1979: Tondemo Nezumi Daikatsuyaku: Manxmouse (Manxmouse's Great Activity, known in English as The Legend of Manxmouse)
- 1991: Miracle in the Wilderness

Radio

- 1949, "Twas the Night Before Christmas", short story dramatized as Attraction 66 of NBC's radio series Radio City Playhouse
- 2010, The Lonely

Stage musicals

- Carnival!, based on The Love of Seven Dolls
- Flowers for Mrs. Harris

Music

- 1975, Music Inspired by The Snow Goose, album by the British progressive rock band Camel, based on The Snow Goose
