= Sheila Mathews Allen =

American actress (1929–2013)

- Born: Sheila Marie Mathews; February 2, 1929; New York City, U.S.
- Died: November 15, 2013 (aged 84); Malibu, California, U.S.
- Occupations: Actress; producer
- Years active: 1959–2006
- Spouse: Irwin Allen (m. 1974; died 1991)

Sheila Mathews Allen (born Sheila Marie Mathews; February 2, 1929 – November 15, 2013) was an American actress and producer.

== Life and career ==
Allen was born in New York City to Christopher Joseph and Elizabeth (née McCloskey) Mathews, both immigrants from Ireland. She was married to producer Irwin Allen until his death in 1991. She appeared in several of her husband's TV series and movies through to 1986. Appearances include City Beneath the Sea, Lost in Space, Land of the Giants, The Poseidon Adventure and The Towering Inferno. Following his death in 1991 she remained on the board of Irwin Allen Productions. She also served as a producer on the 2002 television remake of The Time Tunnel and as Executive Producer of the film Poseidon in 2006.

== Death ==
Allen died on November 15, 2013, at her home in Malibu, California, after an extended battle with pulmonary fibrosis.

== Filmography ==
Year	Title	Role	Notes
1962	State Fair	Hipplewaite's Girl	Uncredited
1962	Five Weeks in a Balloon	The Courtier	Uncredited
1964	Voyage to the Bottom of the Sea	Mrs. Melton	
1972	The Poseidon Adventure	Nurse Gina Rowe	
1974	The Towering Inferno	Paula Ramsay	
1977	Viva Knievel!	Sister Charity	
1980	When Time Ran Out	Mona	

== Television ==
- Voyage to the Bottom of the Sea (1964, 1 episode) as Mrs. Melton
- The Prince and the Pauper (1962, Disney TV 3-part series) as Princess Mary
- Lost in Space (1965-1968, 3 episodes) as Aunt Gamma / Brynhilda / Ruth Templeton
- The Time Tunnel, (1966-1967, TV series) as Producer
- Land of the Giants (1969-1970, 2 episodes) as Miss Collier, Nurse Helg, respectively
- City Beneath the Sea (1971, TV movie) as Blonde Woman
- The Waltons (1976-1978, 5 episodes) as Fanny Tatum
- Alice in Wonderland (1985, TV movie) as Alice's Mother
- Outrage! (1986, TV movie) as Mrs. Delehanty
