= The Poseidon Adventure (2005 film) =

2005 television film

- DVD cover
- Based on: The Poseidon Adventure by Paul Gallico
- Screenplay by: Bryce Zabel
- Directed by: John Putch
- Starring: Adam Baldwin; Rutger Hauer; Steve Guttenberg; Bryan Brown; Alexa Hamilton; Tinarie Van Wyk; C. Thomas Howell; Amber Sainsbury; Nathalie Boltt; Peter Weller
- Music by: Joe Kraemer
- Country of origin: United States
- Original language: English

Production
- Producer: Mary Church
- Cinematography: Ross Berryman
- Editor: Jennifer Jean Cacavas
- Running time: 174 minutes (Note: The version aired on NBC ran roughly forty minutes shorter, to allow for commercials within a three-hour timeslot.)
- Budget: c. $20 million

Original release
- Network: NBC
- Release: November 20, 2005

The Poseidon Adventure is a 2005 American made-for-television disaster film based on Paul Gallico's 1969 novel of the same name. It is a remake of the 1972 film of the same name.

== Plot ==
The SS Poseidon is a 135,000-ton state-of-the-art luxury cruise ship on a cruise from Cape Town, South Africa to Sydney with 3,700 passengers and crew. Four terrorists take two bombs aboard to sink the ship. Sea Marshal Mike Rogo is assigned to the ship to search for any suspicious activity. Passenger and father, Richard Clarke, is having an affair with Shoshanna, a crew member. His family is drifting away from him, and his wife Rachel kicks him out of the family's stateroom. Dylan, their 12-year-old son, witnesses this and is devastated. His older sister, Shelby, is in nursing school and falls in love with the ship's doctor Ballard.

On New Year's Eve, a bomb planted by the group of terrorists explodes, blowing open a hole in the ship's hull. The officers on the bridge and the captain are all shot and killed by rogue waiters. Before the second bomb can explode, it is dismantled by Rogo who also shoots one of the terrorists. Because water is now entering only one side of the ship, the water causes the ship to tip over, throwing many people to their deaths. As the ship continues to tilt, the center of gravity on the ship causes it to completely capsize. Many passengers and crew are injured, crippled, or killed. Ballard's arm is seriously injured. Shelby and one of the showgirls are trapped on a table that is secured to the floor, which is now the ceiling. They are both rescued. Shelby and Ballard then begin helping the injured.

A small group of survivors, including Shelby's mother, prepare to escape the sinking ship through the hole left by the bomb. The cruise hotel manager convinces most survivors in the ballroom to stay, claiming the ship is not sinking and that it is better to wait until help arrives. Shelby decides to stay and help the injured, but knows her mother and younger brother need to leave before it is too late. The others leave the ballroom as Shelby's mother promises to leave traces where the group has gone. They then painfully depart and Shelby waves to her mother with a bloody hand.

The navy realizes that the SS Poseidon has gone missing, and they send out a rescue team. In one of the Poseidon crew quarters, Richard and Shoshanna reach the ballroom through an air vent. Shelby confronts Shoshanna, as Richard decides to follow Rachel and the others with Ballard, Shelby, and Shoshanna. Meanwhile, the other group slowly move towards the hole, with a few people being killed including Belle Rosen. Rachel uses a damaged computer to send a mayday. Back in the ballroom, Richard's group finally decide to leave. Shelby tries to convince more people to come along, but to no avail. As they leave the ballroom, a huge amount of water rushes into the ballroom; killing everyone who did not listen to Shelby.

Meanwhile, Rogo's group splits up, with Rogo taking the terrorist into deeper water to question him, while the rest of the group continues on the path to rescue. Rogo meets up with Richard's group and they all meet up again in the area where the bomb exploded. The debris is too packed to get through. When the navy arrives, their explosives make it even more impossible to get out that way. They are forced to go through the engine room to detonate the other bomb and blast their way out.

As they cross a fallen catwalk over a fiery abyss left by the engines, Shoshanna and the terrorist fall into the flames and die as the others escape. They find the other bomb, detonate it and successfully open a hole in the hull. The survivors jump into the water, and swim to nearby rescue boats. The survivors watch as Poseidon sinks bow first, while Suzanne Harrison, a British agent who had been helping out, laments the fact that there are only nine survivors out of the 3,700 passengers and crew.

== Cast ==
- Adam Baldwin as Sea Marshal Mike Rogo
- Rutger Hauer as Bishop August Schmidt
- Steve Guttenberg as Richard Clarke
- Bryan Brown as Jeffrey Eric Anderson
- Alexa Hamilton as Rachel Clarke
- Tinarie Van Wyk-Loots as Aimee Anderson
- C. Thomas Howell as Doctor Matthew Ballard
- Amber Sainsbury as Shelby Clarke
- Sylvia Syms as Belle Rosen
- Nathalie Boltt as Shoshanna
- Peter Weller as Captain Paul Gallico
- Alex Kingston as Suzanne Harrison
- Clive Mantle as James Martin
- Rory Copus as Dylan Clarke
- Geoff Pierson as Admiral Jennings
- Peter Dobson as Agent Percy
- Andrew Brent as Ronald Acre
- Peter Butler as Badawi

== Production ==
The film was developed as a miniseries by Larry Levenson Productions, directed by John Putch, written by Bryce Zabel, and starring Adam Baldwin, Rutger Hauer and Steve Guttenberg. Filming took place in late 2004. It was initially slated to air on the Hallmark Channel, before NBC picked up the film. It was made shortly before a 2006 theatrical film based on Paul Gallico's novel The Poseidon Adventure was produced by Warner Bros. According to Variety, Warner Bros. produced the 2006 film under a contractual right to remake 1972 film, while Gallico's estate controlled the television rights to the book, which it sold to Hallmark Entertainment.

In the United States, NBC premiered the film in three-hour timeslot on November 20, 2005; while the film runs 174 minutes in total, about forty minutes of material was cut for the NBC broadcast to fit commercials. It also aired in 2005 on the Seven Network in Australia (with the name The New Poseidon Adventure), and in 2006 on the USA Network in the United States. In this adaptation, the plot differs from the original book and first feature film in that the ship capsized because of a terrorist act. Though many of the characters remained the same, several were added. Some were dropped altogether. The character of Mike Rogo was changed to a sea marshal who works for the U.S. Department of Homeland Security.

The film's final scenes include details from the novel of the Poseidon's sinking that were not part of the 1972 film adaptation. The final shot was from the air as the ship's propellers slipped beneath the surface, which, by design or coincidence, matches several photographs taken by a news plane of the final moments of the SS Andrea Doria in 1956.

== Reception ==
Alessandra Stanley of The New York Times wrote that the film avoided the "entropy" of other remakes, adding "It is not quite as deliciously awful as the original 1972 disaster movie, but it comes pretty close". Tom Shales of The Washington Post said that "The characters are flabby yet weightless, just a disgruntled bunch of frumps who face death with hardly an ounce of credible emotion". In The Hollywood Reporter, Barry Garron praised the direction and special effects, but said "'The Morning After' isn't a song but the time period by which most of the movie will be forgotten".

The film drew 9.6 million viewers on NBC, putting the network in third place for that evening, behind CBS, airing the film Snow Wonder, and ABC, which aired Desperate Housewives.
