= Manxmouse =

1968 novel by Paul Gallico

Manxmouse: The Mouse Who Knew No Fear
- First edition (publ. Coward-McCann)
- Author: Paul Gallico
- Language: English
- Publication date: 1968

Manxmouse: The Mouse Who Knew No Fear is a 1968 children's novel by Paul Gallico. The plot is an epic narrative of the adventures of a creature called a Manx Mouse as he meets and interacts with other people, climaxing in a meeting with a Manx cat who characters say is destined to eat him.

== Plot summary ==
A ceramicist who lives in the fictional city of Buntingdowndale in England specializes in making ceramic replicas of mice. One night he gets drunk at a party and comes home intending to make the best mouse figurine he has ever made. With his senses impaired, he inadvertently makes a mouse-like figure described as having a "fat little body like an opossum, hind feet like those of a kangaroo, the front paws of a monkey, and instead of delicate and transparent ears, these were long and much like those of a rabbit. And what is more, they were blue, too, and violently orange-colored on the inside. But the worst thing of all was that it had no tail." He is disappointed but finds that the statue has an endearing look, so he calls it a "Manx Mouse" and decides to keep it. That night while the ceramicist sleeps, the statue comes to life as a Manx Mouse.

The Manx Mouse thinks for himself, and refers to himself by the name Manxmouse. He decides to leave the ceramicist's home and travel. He first meets a clutterbumph, which is a shapeshifting monster that takes the form of whatever those around it fear most. Manxmouse seems to have no fear, and thus the clutterbumph does not scare him, but tells him to "beware the Manx Cat".

Manxmouse leaves that encounter and has a succession of encounters with other entities, including a billibird, House Cat mother, old One-Eye the cat, Captain Hawk, a fox named Joe Reynard, a fox-hunting pack of dogs led by General Hound and called the Bumbleton Hunt, Squire Ffuffer the huntsman, Nelly the Elephant, a little girl named Wendy H. Troy, a tiger named Burra Khan, a truck driver, Mr. Smeater the pet-shop proprietor, a semi-animate wax copy of himself at Madame Tussauds, and a policeman. In each encounter, Manxmouse behaves politely, helpfully, and bravely, and in almost all cases when he leaves one new friend that he has made, that friend warns him that he belongs to Manx Cat and that Manx Cat will eat him.

Finally Manxmouse goes to the Isle of Man to meet Manx Cat. Surprisingly to Manx Mouse, Manx Cat is a proper British gentleman who invites him to tea in his home with his family. During tea, Manx Cat produces a document he calls a Doom, which he says is a prophecy written 1000 years ago specifying a date when the Manx Mouse would come to the Manx Cat to be eaten, and coincidentally Manxmouse has arrived at the specified time. Part of the document is missing, but it seems irrelevant to all parties involved at this time.

Manxmouse and Manx Cat go to a stadium where they appear before a crowd including everyone that Manxmouse has met in his adventures. The policeman who Manxmouse had met earlier mediates the event, saying that Manxmouse should be quickly and painlessly swallowed. But when the time comes for Manxmouse to be eaten, he takes a fighting posture and challenges Manx Cat to eat him.

A representative from Madame Tussauds appears at this time and exhibits the other half of the Doom document. The other half says, "But if the aforesaid Manxmouse instead of yielding and being swallowed shall take a firm stand in his defense and bravely and gallantly show that he means to fight for his life, then the Doom shall become inoperative, null and void and canceled. Manxmouse and Manx Cat shall live in peace forever after." The crowd cheers, Manxmouse and Manx Cat both agree to live by these terms of the Doom, and years later they remain neighbors as Manx Mouse starts his own family with a local field mouse as a wife.

== Anime adaptation ==
The Japanese animation studio Nippon Animation adapted this tale into a feature-length TV special in 1979, directed by Hiroshi Saito, written by Shun'ichi Yukimuro, and featuring famed voice actress Masako Nozawa in the title role. The anime, titled Tondemo Nezumi Daikatsuyaku: Manxmouse (Manxmouse's Great Activity) in Japanese and originally aired on Fuji TV, was dubbed into English as The Adventures of Manxmouse by Intersound Inc. and Harmony Gold in 1989, broadcast on Nickelodeon's weekend Special Delivery programming block, and released on VHS by Celebrity Home Entertainment in 1990 as The Legend of Manxmouse. The anime version focused on Manxmouse's friendships with the clutterbumph (named Dororon in this version and Gholis in the English dub), Captain Hawk, Wendy, and Burra Khan (whose name was re-Anglicized to Bula Khan in the English dub) and changed the climactic scene at the end; the last-minute intervention by a representative from Madame Tussaud's is replaced with an admission by Manx Cat that he had grown fond of Manxmouse and didn't really want to eat him anyway. (Manxmouse's adventures in the village of Nasty, the fox hunt, the movie studio where Manxmouse encounters a nervous elephant, the rare pet shop, and Madame Tussaud's wax museum are also omitted.)

In 2001, the anime was used as part of the Japan-only Anime Eikaiwa series of English learning aids for the PlayStation 2.

=== Cast ===
Character	Japanese	English
Harrison G. Manxmouse	Masako Nozawa	Stephen Apostolina
Mr. Meyer	Ryuji Saikachi	Milt Jamin
Clutterbumph	Ichiro Nagai	Dave Mallow
Mr. Smeater	Tamio Ohki	Steve Kramer
Wendy H. Troy	Kazuko Sugiyama	Wendee Swann
Burra Khan	Teiji Omiya	Michael Sorich
Captain Hawk	Shojiro Kihara	Beau Billingslea
Mr. Mellow	Toshiya Ueda	Michael Forest
Circus Ringmaster	Masashi Amenomori	
Tiger-tamer Eric	Kazuhiko Inoue	
General Hound	Mahito Tsujimura	
Private Hound	Eken Mine	
Policeman	Issei Masamune	
Policeman Frank	Banjo Ginga	Robert Axelrod
Tom Manx Cat	Kazuo Kumakura	Doug Stone
Margery Manx Cat	Akiko Tsuboi	Ellyn Stern
Narrator	Koji Ishizaka	Michael McConnohie

English Voice Actors: Steve Kramer, Robert Axelrod, Mikey Godzilla, Colin Philips, Drew Thomas, Jeffrey Platt, Gregory Snegoff, Ellyn Stern, Milton James
