= Poseidon (species) =

Several species share the specific name poseidon, the species descriptor in a binomial name.

These include:

- Flax poseidon (F. poseidon), a moth
- Hypaeus poseidon (H. poseidon), a spider
- Lepidochrysops poseidon (L. poseidon), a butterfly
- Polyommatus poseidon (P. poseidon), a butterfly
- Thyropygus poseidon (T. poseidon), a millipede

== See also ==
- Poseidon (disambiguation)
