= Viva Knievel! =

1977 American action film

- Theatrical release poster
- Directed by: Gordon Douglas
- Screenplay by: Antonio Santean; Norman Katkov
- Story by: Antonio Santean (as Antonio Santillán)
- Produced by: Stanley Hough
- Starring: Evel Knievel; Gene Kelly; Lauren Hutton; Red Buttons; Leslie Nielsen; Cameron Mitchell; Frank Gifford; Dabney Coleman; Marjoe Gortner
- Cinematography: Fred Jackman Jr.
- Edited by: Harold F. Kress
- Music by: Charles Bernstein
- Production company: Sherrill C. Corwin Productions
- Distributed by: Warner Bros.
- Release date: June 1, 1977
- Running time: 104 minutes
- Country: United States
- Language: English
- Budget: $5 million

Viva Knievel! is a 1977 American action film directed by Gordon Douglas and starring Evel Knievel (as himself), Gene Kelly and Lauren Hutton, with an ensemble supporting cast including Red Buttons, Leslie Nielsen, Cameron Mitchell, Frank Gifford, Dabney Coleman and Marjoe Gortner.

== Plot ==
Daredevil motorcycle rider Evel Knievel stars as himself in this fictional story. The film opens with Knievel sneaking into an orphanage late at night to deliver presents: Evel Knievel action figures. One of the boys casts away his crutches, telling Knievel that he will walk after his accident just as Knievel had.

Knievel then prepares for another of his stunt jumps. We are introduced to his mechanic Will Atkins (Gene Kelly), who was a former stunt rider himself before his wife died, driving him to alcoholism. While signing autographs, Knievel is ambushed by photojournalist Kate Morgan (Lauren Hutton), who has been sent to photograph the jump: if Knievel is killed, it will be a great story.

Before I make the jump, there's something I'd like to say to you, that's been bothering me for a long time.

I go to Indianapolis every year to see the Indy 500. I go there with friends to drive and race. Every year when they go there to qualify, they usually have to go as fast as they possibly can to get a front row position. They put nitro in their cars sometimes, instead of the fuel that is intended to be in the cars so that the cars will go faster ... and they do, for five or ten laps. And then they blow all to hell.
And you people, you kids, if you put nitro in your bodies in the form of narcotics, so that you can do better, or so that maybe you think that you can do better, you will for about five or ten years, and then you'll blow all to hell.

— Evel Knievel, speaking to the audience just before the first jump

Evel does crash while attempting the stunt, and though badly injured, survives. He berates Morgan, announces his retirement, and is taken to the hospital.

While rehabilitating, Knievel resists all attempts to return to performing stunts, including those from Jessie (Marjoe Gortner), a former protégé with mysterious backers who want Evel to do a jump in Mexico. Eventually, Knievel relents and agrees.

In a subplot, Will's estranged son Tommy shows up from boarding school and asks to join the tour. Will, who is reminded of his dead wife, is cold to Tommy, leaving Evel to show the boy kindness. Kate reappears, apologetic for her previous motives, and wishes that Evel will never stop jumping.

Meanwhile, Jessie's benefactor is revealed: drug lord Stanley Millard (Leslie Nielsen). Millard (without Jessie's knowledge) plans to cause a fatal accident during the jump and have Evel's body transported back to America in a duplicate of the tour trailer with a massive supply of drugs hidden in its walls.

Will stumbles onto the plot, but is drugged and sent to a psychiatric ward under the control of the corrupt Ralph Thompson (Dabney Coleman) to prevent him from interfering. Evel sneaks into the ward late at night when Will has dried out, but all Will can remember is that someone knocked him out. Evel leaves him there to keep whoever is behind the plot in the dark.

As Evel prepares for the jump (down a massive ramp and over a fire pit), Jessie—high on drugs—confronts Evel, claiming that he will prove who the best jumper is. Jessie knocks Evel out and dresses in Evel's signature red, white, and blue outfit. Jessie then successfully makes the jump; however, the bike has been sabotaged and he is killed as he lands (footage from a real Knievel crash was used). While the body is taken away for the drug smuggling plot, Evel wakes up, gets on another bike, and goes to free Will.

After escaping the psych ward, the two find the mockup trailer, in which both Tommy and Kate have been taken hostage. Pursuing the truck, Will and Evel split up: Will will disable the semi, Evel will lead off the gun-toting drug lords riding guard in another car.

At the end of several chase scenes, the drug lords are defeated, Will and his son are reunited, and Kate has fallen head over heels for Evel. The film ends with Evel successfully performing a daredevil jump over a pit of fire.

== Cast ==
- Evel Knievel as himself
- Gene Kelly as Will Atkins
- Lauren Hutton as Kate Morgan
- Red Buttons as Ben Andrews
- Leslie Nielsen as Stanley Millard
- Marjoe Gortner as Jessie
- Cameron Mitchell as Barton
- Frank Gifford as himself
- Eric Olson as Tommy Atkins
- Albert Salmi as Cortland
- Dabney Coleman as Ralph Thompson
- Sheila Allen as Sister Charity

== Production ==
The film was released under the Irwin Allen banner, with Allen serving as the uncredited Supervisor Producer. Irwin Allen's wife, Sheila Allen, has a credited role as Sister Charity.

For the more dangerous motorcycle stunts, the producers hired stuntman Gary Charles Davis (left uncredited), who had to do stunts such as crashing the motorcycle twice. The footage used for Jessie's failed jump was actually of Knievel's May 1975 crash at Wembley Stadium.

Although the film features a romantic subplot between Knievel and Lauren Hutton's character, he was married and had three children at the time the film was released. Neither Knievel's wife Linda nor his children are mentioned in the film.

== Popular culture reception ==
The film premiered in June 1977. Three months later, on September 21, 1977, Knievel and his associates attacked promoter Shelly Saltman with an aluminum baseball bat. With Knievel losing most of his sponsorship and marketing deals as a result of the bad publicity, the film became much less commercially attractive, only opening in four further international markets after Knievel's conviction. In addition, the wholesome image of Knievel the movie promoted and the plot point concerning Knievel's promoter being corrupt seemed ill-judged in the light of the events that saw Knievel imprisoned.

In 2013, the film received an internet release with a RiffTrax audio commentary by comedians and Mystery Science Theater 3000 alumni Mike Nelson, Kevin Murphy and Bill Corbett.
