= Poseidon (film) =

2006 American action disaster film by Wolfgang Petersen

- Theatrical release poster
- Directed by: Wolfgang Petersen
- Screenplay by: Mark Protosevich
- Based on: The Poseidon Adventure by Paul Gallico
- Produced by: Wolfgang Petersen; Duncan Henderson; Mike Fleiss; Akiva Goldsman
- Starring: Kurt Russell; Josh Lucas; Richard Dreyfuss; Emmy Rossum; Jacinda Barrett; Mike Vogel; Mía Maestro; Jimmy Bennett; Andre Braugher
- Cinematography: John Seale
- Edited by: Peter Honess
- Music by: Klaus Badelt
- Production companies: Virtual Studios; Irwin Allen Productions; Next Entertainment; Radiant Productions; Synthesis Entertainment
- Distributed by: Warner Bros. Pictures
- Release dates: May 6, 2006 (Tribeca); May 12, 2006 (United States)
- Running time: 98 minutes
- Country: United States
- Language: English
- Budget: $160 million
- Box office: $181 million

Poseidon is a 2006 American action disaster film directed and co-produced by Wolfgang Petersen. It is the third film adaptation of Paul Gallico's 1969 novel The Poseidon Adventure. It stars Kurt Russell, Josh Lucas, and Richard Dreyfuss, with Emmy Rossum, Jacinda Barrett, Mike Vogel, Mía Maestro, Jimmy Bennett, and Andre Braugher in supporting roles. The plot centers on the desperate passengers finding a way to escape the titular cruise ship after it was struck by a rogue wave.

The film was produced by Virtual Studios and distributed by Warner Bros. Pictures. It had a simultaneous release in IMAX format. It was released on May 12, 2006, and it was criticized for its lackluster script but was praised for its visuals and was nominated at the 79th Academy Awards for Best Visual Effects. It grossed $181 million worldwide on a budget of $160 million; however, after the costs of promotion and distribution, Warner Bros. lost $70–80 million on the film, making it a box-office bomb as a result.

== Plot ==
The Poseidon, a luxury cruise ship, is making a transatlantic crossing from London to New York City. Former New York City Mayor and firefighter Robert Ramsey travels to New York with his daughter Jennifer and her boyfriend Christian Sanders, who are soon to be engaged. Also on board are former Navy submariner-turned-professional gambler Dylan Johns, architect Richard Nelson, Maggie James and her son Conor, stowaway Elena Morales, her waiter boyfriend Marco Valentine, singer Gloria, and Captain Michael Bradford

While most of the passengers are in the ballroom celebrating at a New Year's Eve party, officers on the bridge spot a massive rogue wave heading toward the ship. In an attempt to survive the impact, they try to steer the vessel to starboard to take the wave head-on, but she does not turn fast enough. The wave swamps and capsizes the ship, flipping it completely upside down and killing the bridge officers along with numerous passengers and crew members. In the ballroom, Robert and several officers rescue Conor from a piano bolted to what is now the ceiling. Meanwhile, in the nightclub, Jennifer finds Christian pinned under fallen lighting equipment and convinces Elena to help free him. They, along with a gambler named "Lucky" Larry, are the only ones who avoid electrocution when broken wires electrify the rising water from the activated sprinkler system. Back in the ballroom, a badly injured Captain Bradford attempts to restore order. He assures the surviving passengers that emergency beacons have been launched and that rescue will arrive within a few hours, persuading them to stay put. Unconvinced, Dylan believes the only way out is through the bow thrusters, which are now above water. He reluctantly allows Maggie, Conor, Richard, and Robert to join him, with Valentine guiding the group.

In a galley, the group encounters a lift and uses a table as a bridge to cross it. However, the table breaks free while Richard and Valentine (who is clinging to Richard's leg ) are being pulled up by Dylan. As a damaged elevator car above begins to plummet, Dylan urges Richard to kick Valentine loose to save himself; Valentine falls to his death below. The survivors eventually reach the nightclub, where Jennifer, Elena, and Larry have just rescued Christian. They move on to the main lobby and use a collapsed elevator as a bridge. As Larry crosses, a falling air conditioning unit crushes and kills him, which also causes leaking fuel to ignite. Dylan uses a fire hose as a zipline so Jennifer and Robert can cross the gap. Moments later, the extreme water pressure causes the ballroom windows to shatter, drowning the remaining occupants, including Captain Bradford and Gloria.

With the ship sinking rapidly, the group escapes through a ventilation shaft and a pair of ballast tanks. Elena hits her head in an underwater passageway and drowns. The survivors make their way to a crew lounge, only to find that the bow section is flooded and impassable. Moments later, multiple explosions in the engine room flood the stern, shifting the ship's weight and lifting the bow out of the water. They enter the bow thruster and are horrified to find the giant propellers still running. With their path blocked by the propellers and the control room completely submerged, Robert dives underwater to manually shut off the engines. He finds the kill switch broken, but manages to press the reverse button just before drowning.

With the propellers now spinning in the opposite direction, Dylan throws an acetylene tank into the blades, triggering an explosion that destroys the thruster and leaves an opening for their escape. The remaining survivors jump overboard and swim to a nearby life raft just before the vessel capsizes again and sinks stern first into the ocean. After firing a flare from the raft, the survivors are rescued by two helicopters and several rescue ships, which successfully tracked the Poseidon's emergency beacon.

== Cast ==
- Kurt Russell as Robert Ramsey
- Josh Lucas as Dylan Johns
- Richard Dreyfuss as Richard Nelson
- Emmy Rossum as Jennifer Ramsey
- Jacinda Barrett as Maggie James
- Mike Vogel as Christian Sanders
- Mía Maestro as Elena Morales
- Kevin Dillon as Lucky Larry
- Freddy Rodriguez as Marco Valentine
- Jimmy Bennett as Conor James
- Stacy Ferguson as Gloria
- Andre Braugher as Captain Michael Bradford

== Production ==
In February 2004, it was reported that Wolfgang Petersen and producer Mike Fleiss were teaming up for a new adaptation of Paul Gallico's The Poseidon Adventure which had previously been adapted in 1972 for Warner Bros. Pictures. The film came about due to both Fleiss and Petersen being interested in a remake of The Poseidon Adventure with Fleiss being a fan of the original film and Petersen feeling with the advancements in computer-generated imagery and the success of his own The Perfect Storm that the time was right for a remake. At the time of the announcement, it was reported that Petersen only intended to serve as a producer on the film. As part of the agreement to get development of the film started, Fleiss had to promise original producer Irwin Allen's family he would not direct the film after they initially expressed reservations due to Fleiss directing Drunken Jackasses: The Quest. In February 2005, it was reported that production on The Poseidon Adventure would begin that year for a May 5, 2006 release date with Petersen directing. In June of that year, it was reported that the screenplay had been written by Mark Protosevich and Akiva Goldsman, and Kurt Russell, Richard Dreyfuss, and Emmy Rossum had been cast in the film. Warner Bros. executive, Alan F. Horn, helped push the film forward through development as he thought the combination of impressive effects and Petersen's direction would lead to similar success experienced by 20th Century Fox when they released The Day After Tomorrow, but according to various insiders, the script had problems that led to it going through multiple rewrites and proved challenging in signing major names to the cast.

Production on the film began in July 2005.

=== Sets ===
As with the 1972 The Poseidon Adventure film, which based many of its sets on rooms aboard the RMS Queen Mary, the film's set designers drew inspiration for some of the spaces and the exterior aboard the fictional "Poseidon" from rooms aboard RMS Queen Mary 2, most notably in Poseidon's ballroom, which is partly modeled from the dining room on Queen Mary 2.

On the soundstage at Warner Bros. Studios, Burbank in California, two sets for each main room were built, one right-side-up and the other upside down. The upside-down ballroom was built on top of a large water tank in the soundstage so it could be flooded and drained in a matter of hours. The interior and exterior shots of the ship rolling were constructed with computer-generated imagery.

=== Visual effects ===
The primary visual effects were completed by Industrial Light & Magic and Moving Picture Company. ILM used the most advanced version of Mental Ray to photorealistically light and render the shots, and was responsible for all of the ship's exterior shots. The most complicated work was the opening shot of the ship, where the camera tours the ship's exterior. It lasts for two and a half minutes, and featured one of the most complex digital models ILM had ever created. For water simulations, proprietary software known as PhysBAM was used, created in collaboration with Stanford University. Harold "Howie" Weed was the film's computer graphics modeler.

Digital interiors and water effects were created by MPC, while liquid and gaseous effects were simulated with Scanline VFX proprietary software Flowline. Other shots were done by CIS Hollywood, with water effects simulated using RealFlow.

== Soundtrack ==
The soundtrack was released on May 9, 2006, and includes music composed by Klaus Badelt, as well as songs performed by Fergie, who played the character Gloria in the film, and by Federico Aubele.

No.	Title	Performed by	Length
1.	"Won't Let You Fall"	Fergie	4:39
2.	"Bailamos"	Fergie	3:10
3.	"Postales"	Federico Aubele	4:09
4.	"The Poseidon"	Klaus Badelt	3:19
5.	"The Wave"	Klaus Badelt	4:37
6.	"A Map and a Plan"	Klaus Badelt	2:30
7.	"Fire Dive"	Klaus Badelt	2:48
8.	"Claustrophobia"	Klaus Badelt	7:09
9.	"Drowning"	Klaus Badelt	3:05
10.	"Don't Look Down"	Klaus Badelt	3:44
11.	"Escape"	Klaus Badelt	2:42

"Be Without You (Moto Blanco Vocal Mix)" (8:44) by Mary J. Blige is played in the first nightclub scene but was not included on the soundtrack.

== Reception ==
=== Box office ===
It grossed $22,155,410 on its opening weekend, for an average of $6,232 from 3,555 theaters, finishing in second place behind Mission: Impossible III. It eventually earned $60,674,817 in the United States and $121,000,000 in foreign markets, for a total gross of $181,674,817. After all costs were factored in, Poseidon lost approximately $70–80 million for Warner Bros.

=== Critical response ===
On the review aggregator website Rotten Tomatoes, Poseidon has a score of 33% based on 204 reviews, with an average rating of 4.8/10. The consensus reads: "This remake of The Poseidon Adventure delivers dazzling special effects. Unfortunately, it doesn't seem that any of the budget was left over to devote to the script". On Metacritic, which assesses films on a score out of 100, Poseidon has a rating of 50 based on 36 reviews, indicating "mixed or average reviews". Audiences polled by CinemaScore gave it an average grade "B" on an A+ to F scale.

Roger Ebert of the Chicago Sun-Times gave the film 2 out of 4 stars and wrote, "Petersen's heart isn't in it. He is too wise a director to think this is first-rate material, and too good a director to turn it into enjoyable trash." In a two out of four review, Jon Niccum of Lawrence Journal-World described it as "the cinematic equivalent of a Carnival Cruise." Brian Lowry of Variety wrote, "Wolfgang Petersen's large-scale liner moves reasonably well, though anyone with the faintest memory of its 1972 predecessor will wonder where most of the plot went, and the dialogue is so stilted it can honestly be said the less the better."

== Accolades ==
The film was also nominated for the Golden Raspberry Award for Worst Remake or Ripoff, losing to Little Man. However, it was commended for its realistic use of CGI in the capsizing scenes and nominated for the Academy Award for Best Visual Effects, losing to Pirates of the Caribbean: Dead Man's Chest.

Award	Date of the ceremony	Category	Recipients	Result	Ref.
Stinkers Bad Movie Awards	2007	Worst Remake	Poseidon	Nominated	
Visual Effects Society	11 February 2007	Best Single Visual Effect of the Year	Boyd Shermis, Rhonda Gunner, Kim Libreri, and Philippe Rebours – "Opening Sequence"	Nominated	
Visual Effects Society	11 February 2007	Outstanding Created Environment in a Photoreal Feature	Mohen Leo, Daniel Pearson, Willi Geiger, and Matt Brumit	Nominated	
Visual Effects Society	11 February 2007	Outstanding Compositing in a Photoreal Feature	Scott Younkin, Janeen Elliott, Brian Connor, and Mark Nettleton	Nominated	
Golden Raspberry Awards	24 February 2007	Worst Remake, Rip-off or Sequel	Poseidon	Nominated	
Academy Awards	25 February 2007	Best Visual Effects	Boyd Shermis, Kim Libreri, Chaz Jarrett, and John Frazier	Nominated	

== Home media ==
Poseidon was released to DVD on August 22, 2006, in both single-disc and double-disc editions as well as Full-Screen and Widescreen formats and contains a behind-the-scenes featurette and the theatrical trailer. The 2-disc special edition expands on two bonus features, and also includes the documentaries Poseidon: Upside Down: A Unique Set Design Chronicle; A Shipmate's Diary, which covers a film school intern's experience on the set; and a History Channel documentary which explores rogue waves. Domestic DVD sales for Poseidon were $27,196,438.

A triple feature Blu-ray pack with Poseidon, Twister, and The Perfect Storm premiered in January 2012.

Arrow Video released a limited edition 4K Ultra HD Blu-Ray on August 12, 2025.

== See also ==
- List of films set around New Year
