= Flood! =

1976 television film by Earl Bellamy

- Genre: Adventure
- Written by: Don Ingalls
- Directed by: Earl Bellamy
- Starring: Robert Culp; Martin Milner; Barbara Hershey
- Music by: Richard LaSalle
- Country of origin: United States
- Original language: English

Production
- Executive producer: Irwin Allen
- Producer: Al Gail
- Production locations: Brownsville, Oregon; Eugene, Oregon; Harrisburg, Oregon; Fall Creek Lake, Oregon
- Cinematography: Lamar Boren
- Editor: Bill Brame
- Running time: 100 minutes
- Production companies: Irwin Allen Productions; Warner Bros. Television
- Budget: $2.5 million

Original release
- Network: NBC
- Release: November 24, 1976

Flood! is a 1976 American made-for-television adventure film directed by Earl Bellamy. The film premiered on NBC on November 24, 1976.

== Plot ==
A large freshwater lake above the small town of Brownsville, Oregon is a popular tourist attraction and fishing destination, which provides the town with much of its economic activity. After a season of heavy rains, the lake is nearly overflowing. The mayor of the town refuses to open the flood gates to relieve pressure on the dam, for fear of impacting the sportsfishing industry, and the town's economy from the tourist trade.

When the dam starts sprouting small leaks due to the pressure, town board member, Paul Burke enlists the help of Sam Adams to determine the safety of the dam. When the dam starts showing signs of imminent collapse, and the floodgates are jammed and unable to be opened to lower the level of the lake, Burke enlists friend (and helicopter pilot) Steve Brannigan to free the stuck gates using a helicopter before the dam bursts, and floods the town below.

== Cast ==
- Robert Culp as Steve Brannigan
- Martin Milner as Paul Burke
- Barbara Hershey as Mary Cutler
- Richard Basehart as John Cutler
- Carol Lynley as Abbie Adams
- Roddy McDowall as Mr. Franklin
- Cameron Mitchell as Sam Adams
- Eric Olson as Andy Cutler
- Teresa Wright as Alice Cutler
- Francine York as Daisy Kempel
- Whit Bissell as Dr. Ted Horne
- Leif Garrett as Johnny Lowman
- Ann Doran as Emma Fisher
- Elizabeth Rogers as Nancy Lowman
- James Griffith as Charlie Davis
- Edna Helton as Mrs. Wilson
- Gloria Stuart as Mrs. Parker
- Jack Collins as Jack Spangler

== Production ==
Irwin Allen had huge success with two disaster films. In 1975, he announced he would make three TV movies for ABC, The Forgotten World, Flood and Time Traveller. The film ended up on NBC

In August 1976, Robert Culp and Martin Milner signed to star. Filming started that month at Fern Ridge Reservoir west of Eugene, Oregon. Filming continued in Brownsville, Oregon and at the Fall Creek Lake dam, the featured dam in the film. The Brownsville Christian Church was used as the hospital, while the Brownsville Fire Station/City Hall was used as City Hall, but only for exterior shots, as was Main Street. The nearby Crawfordsville Covered Bridge was used also. Brownsville is also the same town that was used to film many scenes for Stand by Me in 1985.

== Reception ==
The Los Angeles Times said it "fails to offer much excitement".
