= Disaster film =

Film genre

A disaster film or disaster movie is a film genre that has an impending or ongoing disaster as its subject and primary plot device. Such disasters may include natural disasters, accidents, military/terrorist attacks or global catastrophes such as a pandemic. A subgenre of action films, these films usually feature some degree of buildup, the disaster itself, and sometimes the aftermath, usually from the point of view of specific individual characters or their families or portraying the survival tactics of different people.

These films often feature large casts of actors and multiple plotlines, focusing on the characters' attempts to avert, escape or cope with the disaster and its aftermath. The genre came to particular prominence during the 1970s with the release of high-profile films such as Airport (1970), followed in quick succession by The Poseidon Adventure (1972), Earthquake (1974) and The Towering Inferno (1974).

The casts are generally made up of familiar character actors. Once the disaster begins in the film, the characters are usually confronted with human weaknesses, perhaps falling in love or finding a villain to blame. The films usually feature a persevering hero or heroine (Charlton Heston, Steve McQueen, etc.) called upon to lead the struggle against the threat; in many cases, the "evil" or "selfish" individuals are the first to succumb to the disaster. The genre experienced a renewal in the 1990s boosted by computer-generated imagery and larger studio budgets which allowed for greater spectacle, culminating in the cinematic phenomenon that was James Cameron's Titanic in 1997.

== Origins ==
Disaster films were made before the phrase was coined in the early 1970s. The genre is almost as old as the film medium itself. One of the earliest was Fire! (1901) made by James Williamson of England. The silent film portrayed a burning house and the firemen who arrive to quench the flames and rescue the inhabitants. Origins of the genre can also be found in In Nacht und Eis (1912), about the sinking of the Titanic; Atlantis (1913), also about the Titanic; the Danish The End of the World (1916), (about a comet); Noah's Ark (1928), the biblical story from Genesis about the great flood; Deluge (1933), about tidal waves devastating New York City; King Kong (1933), with a gigantic gorilla rampaging through New York City; and The Last Days of Pompeii (1935), dealing with the Mount Vesuvius volcanic eruption in 79 AD.

John Ford's The Hurricane (1937) concluded with the striking sequence of a tropical cyclone ripping through a fictional South Pacific island. The drama San Francisco (1936) depicted the historic 1906 San Francisco earthquake, while In Old Chicago (1937) recreated The Great Chicago Fire which burned through the city in 1871. Carol Reed's 1939 film, The Stars Look Down, examines a catastrophe at a coal mine in North-East England.

Inspired by the end of World War II and the beginning of the Atomic Age, science fiction films of the 1950s, including When Worlds Collide (1951), The War of the Worlds (1953) and Godzilla, King of the Monsters! (1956), routinely used world disasters as plot elements. This trend would continue with The Deadly Mantis (1957), The Day the Earth Caught Fire (1961) and Crack in the World (1965). Volcanic disasters would also feature in films such as The Devil at 4 O'Clock (1961) starring Spencer Tracy and Frank Sinatra, and the 1969 epic Krakatoa, East of Java, starring Maximilian Schell.

As in the silent film era, the sinking of the Titanic would continue to be a popular disaster with filmmakers and audiences alike. Werner Klingler and Herbert Selpin released the epic film Titanic in 1943. The film was soon banned in Germany and its director, Selpin, was allegedly executed. The film was a staple for all Titanic films, and scenes became stock footage for the British version. Clifton Webb and Barbara Stanwyck starred in the 1953 20th Century Fox production Titanic, followed by the highly regarded British film A Night to Remember in 1958. The British action-adventure film The Last Voyage (1960), while not about the Titanic disaster but a predecessor to The Poseidon Adventure, starred Robert Stack as a man desperately attempting to save his wife (Dorothy Malone) and child trapped in a sinking ocean liner. The film, concluding with the dramatic sinking of the ship, was nominated for an Oscar for Best Visual Effects.

Additional precursors to the popular disaster films of the 1970s include The High and the Mighty (1954), starring John Wayne and Robert Stack as pilots of a crippled airplane attempting to cross the ocean; Zero Hour! (1957), written by Arthur Hailey (who also penned the 1968 novel Airport) about an airplane crew that succumbs to food poisoning; Jet Storm and Jet Over the Atlantic, two 1959 films both featuring attempts to blow up an airplane in mid-flight; The Crowded Sky (1960) which depicts a mid-air collision; and The Doomsday Flight (1966), written by Rod Serling and starring Edmond O'Brien as a disgruntled aerospace engineer who plants a barometric pressure bomb on an airliner built by his former employer set to explode when the airliner descends for landing.

== 1970s peak ==
The golden age of the disaster film began in 1970 with the release of Airport. A huge financial success, earning more than $100 million ($713 million in 2022-adjusted dollars) at the box office, the film was directed by George Seaton and starred Burt Lancaster, Dean Martin, George Kennedy, Jacqueline Bisset and Helen Hayes. While strictly not even a disaster—an airplane crippled by the explosion of a bomb—the film established the classic blueprint of the genre: a headline emergency story and multiple plotlines acted out by an all-star cast. Airport was nominated for 10 Academy Awards, including Best Picture, winning Best Supporting Actress for Hayes.

The 1972 release of The Poseidon Adventure was another huge financial success, notching an impressive $84 million in US/Canada gross rental theatrical rentals ($592 Million in 2022-adjusted dollars). Directed by Ronald Neame and starring Gene Hackman, Ernest Borgnine, Shelley Winters and Red Buttons, the film detailed survivors' attempts at escaping a sinking ocean liner overturned by a giant wave triggered by an earthquake. The Poseidon Adventure was nominated for eight Academy Awards, including Best Supporting Actress for Shelley Winters, and winning for Original Song and receiving a Special Achievement Award for visual effects.

The trend reached its zenith in 1974 with the release of The Towering Inferno, Earthquake, and Airport 1975 (the first Airport sequel). The competing films enjoyed staggering success at the box office, with The Towering Inferno earning $116 million ($697 million in 2022-adjusted dollars), Earthquake earning $79 million ($475 million in 2022-adjusted dollars), and Airport 1975 earning $47 million ($282 million in 2022-adjusted dollars) in theatrical rentals.

Arguably the greatest of the 1970s disaster films, The Towering Inferno was a joint venture of 20th Century Fox and Warner Bros. and was produced by Irwin Allen (eventually known as "The Master of Disaster", as he had previously helmed The Poseidon Adventure and later produced The Swarm, Beyond the Poseidon Adventure and When Time Ran Out...). Directed by John Guillermin and starring Paul Newman, Steve McQueen, William Holden and Faye Dunaway, the film depicts a huge fire engulfing the tallest building in the world and firefighters' attempts at rescuing occupants trapped on the top floor. The film was nominated for eight Academy Awards including Best Picture, winning for Best Cinematography, Best Film Editing and Best Original Song.

Earthquake was also honored with four Academy Award nominations for its impressive special effects of a massive earthquake leveling the city of Los Angeles, winning for Best Sound and receiving a Special Achievement Award for visual effects. The film was directed by Mark Robson and starred Charlton Heston, Ava Gardner, Geneviève Bujold, George Kennedy and Lorne Greene. It was noted as the first film to utilize Sensurround, where massive subwoofer speakers were installed in theaters to recreate the vibrating sensation of an earthquake. Several made-for-TV movies also capitalized on the craze, including Heatwave! (1974), The Day the Earth Moved (1974), Hurricane (1974), Flood! (1976) and Fire! (1977).

The trend continued on a larger scale with The Hindenburg (1975), starring George C. Scott; The Cassandra Crossing (1976), starring Burt Lancaster; Two-Minute Warning (1976), starring Charlton Heston; Black Sunday (1977), starring Robert Shaw; Rollercoaster in Sensurround (1977), starring George Segal; Damnation Alley (1977), starring Jan-Michael Vincent; Avalanche (1978), starring Rock Hudson; Gray Lady Down (1978), also starring Charlton Heston; Hurricane (a 1979 remake of John Ford's 1937 film; a different movie from the made-for-TV production of same title listed above), starring Jason Robards; and City on Fire (1979), starring Barry Newman. The Airport series continued with Airport '77 (1977) and The Concorde... Airport '79 (1979), with George Kennedy portraying the character Joe Patroni in each sequel, and The Poseidon Adventure was followed by Beyond the Poseidon Adventure in 1979.

The genre began to burn out by the late-1970s when the big-budget films The Swarm (1978), Meteor (1979), Hurricane (1979), The Concorde... Airport '79 (1979), Beyond the Poseidon Adventure (1979) and When Time Ran Out... (1980) performed poorly at the box office, signaling declining interest in the disaster film product.

Although The Big Bus (1976), an earlier disaster film spoof, had failed to be a hit, the end of the trend was marked by the 1980 comedy Airplane!, which fondly spoofed the clichés of the genre to surprising box-office success, producing a sequel of its own, Airplane II: The Sequel, in 1982.

== 1990s revival ==
The resurgence of big-budget productions of the genre—aided by advancements in CGI technology during the 1990s—include such films as Twister, Independence Day, Daylight, Dante's Peak, Volcano, Hard Rain, Deep Impact and Armageddon. In 1997, James Cameron co-produced, wrote and directed a version of the epic story of the Titanic. The film combined romance with intricate special effects and was a massive success, becoming the highest-grossing film of all time for twelve years with over $2.2 billion worldwide, and won 11 Academy Awards including Best Picture and Best Director.

== See also ==
- List of disaster films
- Doomsday film
