= Irwin Allen =

American filmmaker (1916–1991)

- Born: Irwin O. Cohen; June 12, 1916; New York City, U.S.
- Died: November 2, 1991 (aged 75); Santa Monica, California, U.S.
- Resting place: Mount Sinai Memorial Park Cemetery
- Occupations: Film producer; film director; television producer; screenwriter
- Years active: 1950–1986
- Known for: Science fiction movies and television series
- Spouse: Sheila Mathews (m. 1974)
- Parents: Joseph Cohen (father); Eva Davis (mother)

Irwin Allen (born Irwin O. Cohen; June 12, 1916 – November 2, 1991) was an American film and television producer and director, known for his work in science fiction, then later as the "Master of Disaster" for his work in the disaster film genre. His most successful productions were The Poseidon Adventure (1972) and The Towering Inferno (1974). He also created and produced the popular 1960s science-fiction television series Voyage to the Bottom of the Sea, Lost in Space, The Time Tunnel, and Land of the Giants.

== Biography ==
=== Early life ===
Irwin Allen was born in New York City, the son of poor Jewish immigrants (Joseph Cohen and Eva Davis) from Russia. He majored in journalism and advertising at Columbia University after attending City College of New York for a year. He left college because of financial difficulties caused by the Great Depression.

=== Radio and journalism ===
Allen moved to Hollywood in 1938, where he edited Key magazine followed by an 11-year stint producing his own program at radio station KLAC. The success of the radio show led to him being offered his own gossip column, "Hollywood Merry-Go-Round", which was syndicated to 73 newspapers.

He produced his first TV program, a celebrity panel show also called Hollywood Merry-Go-Round with announcer, and later Tonight Show host, Steve Allen (no relation), before moving into film production.

=== RKO ===
Allen became involved in film production at a time when power was beginning to shift from studios to talent agencies. He put together packages consisting of directors, actors, and a script, and sold them to film studios.

Allen's first film as producer was Where Danger Lives (1950) with Robert Mitchum, directed by John Farrow and written by Charles Bennett. Allen produced it with Irving Cummings, Jr. The two men made two more films for RKO: Double Dynamite (1951) with Jane Russell, Groucho Marx, and Frank Sinatra, and A Girl in Every Port (1952), again with Marx and William Bendix.

Allen made his directorial debut with the documentary, The Sea Around Us (1953). This was based on Rachel Carson's best-selling book of the same name. It largely used stock footage and won the 1952 Academy Award for Best Documentary Feature. Carson was so disappointed with Allen's final version of the script that she never again sold film rights to her work. The film includes gory images of whales being killed. It was a success, making a profit over $2 million.

Allen returned to producing with the three-dimensional film Dangerous Mission (1954), his final film for RKO. It starred Victor Mature, Bendix, Piper Laurie, and Vincent Price.

=== Warner Brothers ===
Allen directed a semidocumentary about the evolution of life, The Animal World (1956). Again, making use of stock footage, but he also included a 9-minute stop-motion dinosaur sequence by Ray Harryhausen. Before release, he toned down the gore from both the live action and the animation.

The film was released by Warner Bros. So was Allen's next film, The Story of Mankind (1957), a very loose adaptation of the Hendrik Willem van Loon book of the same name. It featured cameos from the Marx Brothers, Ronald Colman, Hedy Lamarr, Vincent Price, and Dennis Hopper. The actors were each paid $2,500 (equal to $28,658 today) for a single day's work with Allen relying on stock footage for the rest of the film.

Allen co-wrote (with Bennett) and produced The Big Circus (1959) for Allied Artists Pictures with Mature, Red Buttons, Peter Lorre, and Price. Allen was interested in making "an exciting, colorful show – something the public can't see on television." Allen was fascinated by circuses as a child and briefly worked as a carnival barker at age 16. In addition to The Big Circus, he worked circus-themed episodes into his TV programs Lost in Space and Voyage to the Bottom of the Sea and would try for years to get a widescreen, 3-D project called Circus, Circus, Circus into theaters.

=== 20th Century Fox ===
==== Films as director ====
Allen then went to 20th Century Fox, where he co-wrote (with Bennett), produced, and directed three films: The Lost World (1960), from the novel by Arthur Conan Doyle, Voyage to the Bottom of the Sea (1961), and Five Weeks in a Balloon (1962).

Willis O'Brien, who had also worked on the pioneering special effects of the original Lost World (1925) and King Kong (1933) films, was disappointed when Allen opted to save time by using live alligators and lizards instead of stop-motion animation for the film's dinosaurs. Voyage to the Bottom of the Sea was a scientifically dubious, Jules Verne-style adventure to save the world from a burning Van Allen belt. It was the basis for his later television series of the same name. The family film, Five Weeks in a Balloon, was a loose adaptation of the Verne novel. Lost World was a moderate hit and Voyage was very successful. Five Weeks was a box-office disappointment.

==== Television series ====
With 20th Century Fox scaling back their film productions due to their huge expenditure on films such as Cleopatra (1963), in the mid-1960s, Allen concentrated on television, producing several overlapping science-fiction series for 20th Century Fox Television. They featured special effects by L. B. Abbott, who won three Emmys for his work. Allen used many of the same craftsmen on his TV shows as he did on his films, including composer John Williams and costume designer and general assistant Paul Zastupnevich.

Voyage to the Bottom of the Sea (ABC TV, 1964–1968) established Allen's reputation as a television producer. The financial viability of the series was assisted by the reuse of many of the sets from the film; the cost of the Seaview submarine sets alone exceeded the budget of a typical pilot show of the era. The series also benefited from Allen's by-now notorious use of stock film footage, particularly from Hell and High Water (1954), The Enemy Below (1957), and Allen's The Lost World.

Allen had originally intended Lost in Space (CBS TV, 1965–1968) to be a family show, a science-fiction version of The Swiss Family Robinson. It quickly developed into a children's show with episodes concentrating on the young Will Robinson, the robot, and especially, the comic villain, Dr. Smith. The show used several science-fiction elements that have since become common, such as the comic robot (e.g. Silent Running, Star Wars) or android (Logan's Run, Star Trek: The Next Generation), the heroic child (Meeno Peluce in Voyagers!, Wesley Crusher), and the wacky, lovable alien (Albert in Alien Nation, Vir in Babylon 5).

The Time Tunnel (ABC TV, 1966–1967), with each episode set in a different historical time period, was an ideal vehicle for Allen's talent for smoothly mixing live action with stock footage from films set in the same period. A change in network management led to the show being cancelled after just one season. Allen cited The Time Tunnel as his favorite of all of his television productions and he would attempt to revamp and relaunch the concept numerous times including a filmed pilot in 1976 called The Time Travelers and unfilmed concepts that included one called Time Travel Agency and another called The Time Project that went through several incarnations.

Land of the Giants (ABC TV, 1968–1970) was the most expensive show of its day at roughly $250,000 per episode. As another castaway-themed show, Allen incorporated some of the successful elements from Lost in Space, although this time he did not allow the treacherous character to dominate the series.

==== Television films ====
Allen also produced several television films, such as City Beneath the Sea, which recycled many props and models from Voyage, Lost in Space, and The Man from the 25th Century. Though intended as a pilot for a new TV series project, his small-screen success from the 1960s largely eluded him in the 1970s.

Lost in Space's Bill Mumy said of Allen that, while he was very good at writing television pilots that sold, his unwillingness to spend money hurt his shows' quality once on the air. A monster costume that appeared on one of his shows, for example, would appear on another a few weeks later with new paint. Writer Jon Abbott described Allen as paradoxical. "Here was a man who, when told the cost of a spaceship for a Lost in Space alien, snapped, 'Let him walk!' ... and then let the show be cancelled rather than take a cut in the budget".

In 1969, Allen signed a three-picture deal with Avco Embassy to make The Poseidon Adventure, No Man's World, and Almost Midnight, but the deal did not lead to any films there.

==== The Poseidon Adventure and The Towering Inferno ====
In the 1970s, Allen produced the most successful films of his career: The Poseidon Adventure (1972) and The Towering Inferno (1974), directing the action scenes for both. Their showmanship was compared to that of P. T. Barnum and Cecil B. DeMille, and they prompted scholarly analysis of the subsequent popularity of the disaster genre.

The Poseidon Adventure was based on the Paul Gallico novel of the same name and directed by Ronald Neame. Unable to find a studio to fully back the venture, Allen raised half the $5 million budget, with 20th Century-Fox putting up the rest; the film eventually grossed over $100 million. L. B. Abbott and A. D. Flowers won a Special Achievement Academy Award for the film's optical and physical effects.

Allen hoped to follow up on the success of The Poseidon Adventure with a film based on the novel The Tower, but the film rights had already been taken by Warner Bros. He looked for an alternative and found a similar story in The Glass Inferno. Rather than produce competing movies, 20th Century-Fox and Warner Bros. agreed to coproduce The Towering Inferno with a script based on both novels and a $14 million budget. It was the first time two major studios made a film together, splitting the costs. Despite its nearly three-hour run time, the film, directed by John Guillermin, was a hit and won three Academy Awards.

==== Final television films for Fox ====
The success of the films led to Allen receiving an offer to make three television films. "I missed television", said Allen. "There's a hysteria and an excitement in television that exists nowhere else in business."

Each was made for Fox television at a budget of $1 million with a view to possibly going to series. They screened on different networks: Adventures of the Queen (1975), The Swiss Family Robinson (1975), and Time Travelers (1976). Only Swiss Family was picked up for a series, running for 20 episodes.

=== Return to Warner Bros. ===
Allen left 20th Century Fox when a change in management in 1976 cancelled the remaining three planned disaster films, with incoming studio chief Alan Ladd, Jr. feeling that the disaster genre had run its course. Allen was offered a deal at Warner Bros. by Jon Calley, who built an office building for Allen. Allen continued to work there for the remainder of his career.

The rise of new filmmakers such as George Lucas reportedly caught him off guard. According to one book, the success of Star Wars (1977) bewildered him; he could not understand how a film with apparently no stars or love story could enrapture audiences so fervently.

Allen produced three made-for-TV disaster movies: Flood! (1976), Fire! (1977), and Hanging by a Thread (1979). He also made Viva Knievel! (1977), The Amazing Captain Nemo (1978), and The Memory of Eva Ryker (1980).

For theatrical release, he produced and directed the big-budgeted The Swarm (1978) and Beyond the Poseidon Adventure (1979), and produced When Time Ran Out (1980). These three films were back-to-back-to-back box office disappointments, with the final failure of When Time Ran Out effectively ending his theatrical film career.

Allen also purchased the rights to several Marvel Comics characters including Daredevil, Black Widow and others for television adaptation in the 1980s; he commissioned a script for a Daredevil pilot from writer Stirling Silliphant, but the project never went before cameras.

"No, I'm not going to run out of disasters", he said in a 1977 interview. "Pick up the daily newspaper, which is my best source for crisis stories, and you'll find 10 or 15 every day ... People chase fire engines, flock to car crashes. People thrive on tragedy. It's unfortunate, but in my case, it's fortunate. The bigger the tragedy, the bigger the audience."

=== Final films ===
Allen later went to Columbia to make a short-lived TV series, Code Red (1981–1982). His last films for Warner Bros. were The Night the Bridge Fell Down (1983) and Cave-In! (1979, though not released until 1983). Shortly before Cave-In! made its TV debut, Allen was awarded a Worst Career Achievement Golden Raspberry Award.

While at Columbia, Allen made a $14 million TV version of Alice in Wonderland (1985). His last credit was the TV movie Outrage! (1986).

Allen planned to make a star-studded musical of Pinocchio, but his declining health forced his retirement in 1986. He died in Los Angeles from a heart attack on November 2, 1991. He is buried in the Garden of Heritage 5, upper-level wall crypt 39J in Mount Sinai Memorial Park Cemetery in Los Angeles.

== Legacy ==
The "Irwin Allen rock-and-roll" is when the camera is rocked as the on-screen cast rushes from side to side on the set, simulating a ship being tossed around. It is employed in many episodes of Lost in Space and Voyage to the Bottom of the Sea. This camera technique was employed in the Mystery Science Theater 3000 episode "First Spaceship on Venus". Here, the camera tilts to simulate the spacecraft being hit. During this scene, Joel shouts out, "Irwin Allen presents...".

Allen's career in film and TV was the subject of a 1995 documentary, The Fantasy Worlds of Irwin Allen, produced and directed by Kevin Burns, co-founder of Foxstar Productions, originally set up as the production unit responsible for creating a series of Alien Nation movies for television. Numerous cast members and associates from various Irwin Allen projects appeared in the film, lending recollections of their time working with him.

In 1994, while senior VP of Foxstar, Burns founded Van Ness Films, a nonfiction and documentary production unit. That same year, he met Jon Jashni, a Fox film executive who shared Burns' interest in Allen's works. In 1998, the two collaborated on a TV retrospective special, Lost in Space Forever. Hosted by John Laroquette, it chronicled the series' creation and run on TV in the 1960s and beyond, and featured appearances by Bill Mumy, Jonathan Harris, June Lockhart, Angela Cartwright, Mark Goddard, and Marta Kristen, as well as film footage of vintage interviews with Guy Williams. Also appearing were Bob May, who donned the robot suit, and Dick Tufeld, who supplied the character's voice. The flight deck set of the Jupiter 2 spacecraft from the series was recreated as the backdrop for parts of the special.

It also was used as a vehicle to promote the 1998 Lost in Space film version of the original television series, starring William Hurt, Matt LeBlanc, Gary Oldman, Lacey Chabert, Mimi Rogers, and Heather Graham.

Burns and Jashni later formed Synthesis Entertainment, and began developing and producing remakes of, and sequels to, several Allen properties, including a 2002 Fox Television pilot for an updated version of The Time Tunnel, which did not sell, and remakes of films including Poseidon (2006) and Voyage to the Bottom of the Sea. The 2002 TV pilot was included as a bonus feature on Volume 2 of Fox's 2006 DVD release of the 30-episode Time Tunnel (1966–1967) TV series.

== Partial filmography ==
Year	Title	Director	Producer	Writer	Notes
1950	Where Danger Lives		Yes		
1954	Dangerous Mission		Yes		
1957	The Story of Mankind	Yes	Yes	Yes	
1960	The Big Circus		Yes	Yes	
1960	The Lost World	Yes	Yes	Yes	
1961	Voyage to the Bottom of the Sea	Yes	Yes	Yes	
1962	Five Weeks in a Balloon	Yes	Yes	Yes	
1972	The Poseidon Adventure		Yes		Nominated—Golden Globe Award for Best Motion Picture – Drama
1974	The Towering Inferno	action sequences	Yes		Nominated—Academy Award for Best Picture
1978	The Swarm	Yes	Yes		
1979	Beyond the Poseidon Adventure	Yes	Yes		
1980	When Time Ran Out		Yes		

=== Documentary films ===
Year	Title	Director	Producer	Writer	Notes
1953	The Sea Around Us	Yes	Yes	Yes	Academy Award for Best Documentary Feature
1956	The Animal World	Yes	Yes	Yes	-

== In popular culture ==
On January 3, 2008, BBC Four showed a night of Allen's work which included the 1995 documentary The Fantasy Worlds of Irwin Allen along with episodes of Lost in Space, Land of the Giants and Voyage to the Bottom of the Sea.

Episode 57 of the Disney TV series DuckTales, broadcast on December 8, 1987 and titled "The Uncrashable Hindentanic", features a character called "Irwin Mallard" who films the destruction of Scrooge McDuck's airship called the Hindentanic in the disaster movie style of Irwin Allen.

"The Irwin Allen Show" was a skit on SCTV. The Irwin Allen Show was a Johnny Carson–style talk show with Allen (played by Rick Moranis) as the host. The guests were stars in Allen's movies, and they were each individually victims of an Irwin Allen–style disaster while a guest on the talk show (e.g. Red Buttons was attacked by a swarm of bees).

In the film Ocean's Thirteen (2007) Linus Caldwell (played by Matt Damon) announces aloud to a catatonic Reuben Tishkoff that Rusty Ryan is doing an 'Irwin Allen' which is a reference to the fake earthquake they stage later in the story.

American noise rock band Killdozer released a song about Irwin Allen's work called "Man vs. Nature".

The second half of "Marge vs. the Monorail," often considered the best episode of the long-running animated comedy The Simpsons, is a parody of Irwin Allen's disaster films.
