= SS Empire Faun =

World War II merchant ship of the United Kingdom

History
- Name: Empire Faun (1942–51); Poseidon (1951–59); RFA Sirius (1959–62); Sirius (1962– )
- Owner: Ministry of War Transport (1942–45); Ministry of Transport (1945–51); Admiralty (1951-62); Greek Navy (1962– )
- Operator: Coastal Tankers Ltd (1943–45); Anglo-Saxon Petroleum Co Ltd (1945- ); Greek Navy (1951–59); Royal Fleet Auxiliary (1959–62); Greek Navy (1962- )
- Port of registry: Goole, United Kingdom (1943-51); (Greece) Greek Navy (1951-59); Royal Fleet Auxiliary (1959–62); (Greece) Greek Navy(1962– )
- Builder: Goole Shipbuilding & Repairing Co Ltd
- Yard number: 389
- Launched: 12 October 1942
- Completed: February 1943
- Identification: United Kingdom Official Number 169080 (1942–59); Code Letters BFGC; (1943-); Code Letters MLZQ ( -1951); Pennant number A345 (1959-62)
- Status: In service as of 1962

General characteristics
- Class & type: Coastal tanker
- Tonnage: 846 GRT; 364 NRT
- Length: 188 feet 7 inches (57.48 m)
- Beam: 31 ft 3 in (9.53 m)
- Draught: 13 ft 4.75 in (4.08 m)
- Depth: 14 ft 0 in (4.27 m)
- Installed power: 154 nhp
- Propulsion: Triple expansion steam engine, single screw propeller

Empire Faun was a 846 GRT Coastal tanker that was built in 1942 by Goole Shipbuilding and Repairing Co Ltd, Goole, United Kingdom for the Ministry of War Transport (MoWT). She was loaned to the Greek Navy in 1959 as BN Poseidon. In 1959, she was transferred to the Royal Fleet Auxiliary as RFA Sirius. She was sold to the Greek Navy in 1962.

== Description ==
The ship was a Coastal tanker built in 1942 by Goole Shipbuilding and Repairing Co Ltd, Goole, United Kingdom. She was yard number 389.

The ship was 188 feet 7 inches (57.48 m) long, with a beam of 31 feet 3 inches (9.53 m). She had a depth of 14 feet 0 inches (4.27 m) and a draught of 13 feet 4.75 inches (4.08 m). She was assessed at 846 GRT, 364 NRT.

The ship was propelled by a 154 nhp triple expansion steam engine, which had cylinders of 15 inches (38 cm), 25 inches (64 cm) and 52 inches (130 cm) diameter by 27 inches (69 cm) stroke. The engine was built by the Amos & Smith Ltd, Hull.

== History ==
Empire Faun was built by Goole Shipbuilding and Repairing Co Ltd, Goole, United Kingdom. She was launched on 12 October 1942 and completed in February 1943. Built for the MOWT, she was placed under the management of Coastal Tankers Ltd. The United Kingdom Official Number 1169080 and Code Letters BFGC were allocated. Her port of registry was Goole.

Empire Faun was a member of Convoy EN 217, which departed from Methil, Fife on 16 April 1943 and arrived at Loch Ewe two days later. She then sailed to Gibraltar, from where she departed on 22 June 1943 as a member of Convoy GTX 3, which arrived at Port Said, Egypt on 4 July. She left the convoy at Bizerta, Algeria on 2 July.

Empire Faun departed from Naples, Italy under escort on 28 June 1944 for Civitavecchia. She departed under escort on 3 July for Naples, from where she departed on 12 August as a member of Convoy SM 1A in support of Operation Dragoon, arriving at Ajaccio, Sicily the next day. Empire Faun departed from Marseille, Bouches-du-Rhône, France on 8 October as a member of Convoy SRM 16, which arrived at Naples on 10 October. She then sailed to Taranto, Italy, from where she departed on 24 October with Convoy HP 1, which arrived at Piraeus Greece on 27 October. Listed as a member of Convoy PH 5, she actually departed from Piraeus on 22 November under escort for Bari, Italy. Empire Faun departed from Bari under escort on 31 December and arrived at Ancona, Italy the next day.

Empire Faun departed from Ancona on 2 February 1945 as a member of Convoy HA 9/2, which arrived at Bari two days later. In 1945, management was transferred to the Anglo-Saxon Petroleum Co Ltd. Her Code Letters were later changed to MLZQ.

In 1951, Empire Faun was loaned to the Greek Navy and renamed Poseidon. In 1959, Poseidon was transferred to the Royal Fleet Auxiliary as RFA Sirius. The Pennant number A345 was allocated. In 1962, RFA Sirius was sold to the Greek Navy.
