= USS Poseidon (ARL-12) =

1944 Achelous-class repair ship

- USS Poseidon (ARL-12) at anchor off Okinawa, c. 1945.

History

United States
- Name: USS Poseidon
- Builder: Boston Navy Yard
- Laid down: 10 July 1944
- Launched: 24 August 1944
- Commissioned: 13 February 1945
- Stricken: 1 July 1961

General characteristics
- Class & type: Achelous-class repair ship
- Displacement: 4,100 long tons (4,166 t)
- Length: 328 ft (100 m)
- Beam: 50 ft (15 m)
- Draft: 14 ft (4.3 m)
- Speed: 12 knots (14 mph; 22 km/h)
- Complement: 253 officers and enlisted men
- Armament: 8 × 40 mm cannon; 8 × 20 mm cannon

USS Poseidon (ARL-12) was one of 39 Achelous-class landing craft repair ships built for the United States Navy during World War II. Named for Poseidon (the Greek god of the sea), she was the only ship U.S. Naval vessel to bear the name.

Her keel was laid down as LST-1037 by the Boston Navy Yard in Boston, Massachusetts, on 10 July 1944. She was renamed Poseidon and given hull classification symbol ARL-12 on 12 June 1944; launched on 24 August 1944; sponsored by Mrs. Nora T. Twomey; and placed in reduced commission on 22 September 1944. Following initial commissioning, Poseidon steamed south to Baltimore, Maryland, where she decommissioned and completed conversion to a landing craft repair ship. Commissioned in full 13 February 1945, she completed shakedown in Chesapeake Bay and, assigned to ServRon 10, sailed for Ulithi, thence, in early June, to Okinawa. There, at Kerama Retto and at Buckner Bay, she repaired landing and patrol craft until the cessation of hostilities. Ordered back to the United States after World War II for inactivation, she decommissioned on 30 November 1946 and was berthed with the Columbia River Group of the Pacific Reserve Fleet. She remained a unit of that group until struck from the Naval Vessel Register on 1 July 1961.

She was sold 3 November 1961 to the Marine Power and Equipment Company of Seattle, Washington. Her final fate is unknown.
