= Beyond the Poseidon Adventure =

1979 film by Irwin Allen

- Theatrical release poster by Mort Künstler
- Directed by: Irwin Allen
- Screenplay by: Nelson Gidding
- Based on: The Poseidon Adventure; 1969 novel by Paul Gallico; Beyond the Poseidon Adventure; 1978 novel by Paul Gallico
- Produced by: Irwin Allen
- Starring: Michael Caine; Sally Field; Telly Savalas; Peter Boyle; Jack Warden; Shirley Knight; Slim Pickens; Angela Cartwright; Mark Harmon; Shirley Jones; Karl Malden; Veronica Hamel; Paul Picerni
- Cinematography: Joseph Biroc
- Edited by: Bill Brame
- Music by: Jerry Fielding
- Distributed by: Warner Bros.
- Release date: May 25, 1979
- Running time: 114 minutes
- Country: United States
- Language: English
- Budget: $10 million
- Box office: $2.1 million

Beyond the Poseidon Adventure is a 1979 American disaster film and a sequel to The Poseidon Adventure (1972) directed by Irwin Allen and starring Michael Caine and Sally Field. It was a critical and commercial failure. Its box office receipts were only 20% of its estimated $10 million budget.

== Plot ==
The capsized luxury liner S.S. Poseidon (Note: First introduced in The Poseidon Adventure.) is still afloat after six survivors have been rescued by the French Coast Guard. Mike Turner, captain of the tugboat Jenny, spots the rescue helicopter and finds the shipwreck. Accompanied by second mate Wilbur and passenger Celeste Whitman, Turner heads out to claim salvage rights, as the Jenny lost its cargo in the same tsunami that capsized the Poseidon.

They are soon followed by Dr. Stefan Svevo and his crew, who claim to be Greek Orthodox medics who received the ship's SOS. They board the vessel through the bottom hull opening made by the French rescue team and come across the fires still raging in the engine room and the body of Linda Rogo. Eventually, there is an explosion deep inside Poseidon. The group soon encounters more survivors, the ship's nurse, Gina Rowe and two passengers, Suzanne Constantine and war veteran Frank Mazzetti, who is searching for his missing daughter Theresa. Theresa is found, as are elevator operator Larry Simpson and Tex, a supposed billionaire who clings to a valuable bottle of wine. They also find the blind Harold Meredith and his wife Hannah, who were waiting to be rescued.

Water continues to submerge decks, and more explosions occur. Turner's group find the purser's office, where Svevo decides that he and his men will search for other survivors, parting ways with the rest. Another explosion causes the safe in the purser's office to fall and open, revealing gold coins, diamonds and cash. Turner and Wilbur gather the coins.

Unknown to Turner and the survivors, Suzanne is actually working with Svevo. She takes a list containing information about a cargo of crates from the office. Going off on her own, she gives Svevo the document but decides to rejoin Turner's group. Svevo orders Doyle, one of his men, to kill Suzanne. After being shot, a dying Suzanne strikes Doyle with an axe, killing him. While making their way up through the decks, Turner and the others find Suzanne's corpse and realize that a murderer is on board.

Hannah dislocates her shoulder while helping Harold. Svevo and his men are found gathering a cargo of plutonium. Svevo reveals that his real intention for boarding the Poseidon was to retrieve his lost shipment of plutonium, adding that he cannot let Turner and his group go now. However, before anyone is killed, another explosion occurs, allowing Turner's group to escape.

Turner, Frank, and Larry find guns. In the ensuing shoot-out, Frank and another of Svevo's men are killed. Water floods the room as Turner's group proceeds up to the next deck. An injured Hannah, unable to climb a ladder, falls into the rising water and drowns. While trying to rescue her, Turner loses all of his salvaged gold. Svevo and his one remaining gunman head back up to the ship's stern, where the rest of Svevo's team attempt to use a crane to raise the plutonium up to the hull, which is slowly sinking.

In another section of the ship, Turner and the survivors exit the ship through an underwater side door. However, due to shortage of scuba tanks, Wilbur sacrifices himself by swimming underwater and disappearing. Turner and Celeste swim to the tugboat and move it closer to the Poseidon as the remaining survivors swim towards it. Svevo's men see them and open fire. Tex, who in reality was not a wealthy passenger but a sommelier from the Poseidon's crew, holds onto his bottle as he is gunned down and perishes. The rest of Turner's group reaches the tugboat and sails away. Water continues to flood the Poseidon, causing the boilers to finally explode, which detonates the plutonium cargo, blowing the ship in half and sinking it, killing Svevo and his men.

En route, Turner accepts that his tugboat will be taken from him when they get to port, but Celeste reveals a diamond she salvaged from the Poseidon. The two kiss, and the tugboat sails away into the sunset, bringing the total survivors of the disaster to ten.

== Characters ==
Salvage team

- Michael Caine as Captain Michael "Mike" Turner
- Karl Malden as First Mate Wilbur Hubbard
- Sally Field as Celeste Whitman

Greek medical rescue team

- Telly Savalas as Dr. Stefan Svevo
- Paul Picerni as Kurt
- Patrick Culliton as Doyle
- Dean Raphael Ferrandini as Castorp

Poseidon passengers

- Peter Boyle as Frank Mazzetti
- Angela Cartwright as Theresa Mazzetti
- Jack Warden as Harold Meredith
- Shirley Knight as Hannah Meredith
- Veronica Hamel as Suzanne Constantine

Poseidon crew

- Shirley Jones as Nurse Gina Rowe
- Slim Pickens as Assistant Wine Steward Dewey "Tex" Hopkins
- Mark Harmon as Elevator Operator Larry Simpson

== Production ==
In 1973, soon after the first film came out, producer Irwin Allen proposed a sequel that would have had the survivors testifying in a hearing on the disaster in Austria, the country of the Poseidon's parent company. While on a train to the hearing, a miles-long mountain tunnel would collapse, leaving the survivors of the train trapped inside, struggling to make their way out. The film was planned to be released at Christmas 1974 from 20th Century Fox. Most of the main cast was initially intended to reprise their roles from the first film. This premise was eventually used in the Rob Cohen film Daylight (1996) with Sylvester Stallone.

Originally planned with the first film's distributor 20th Century Fox, the film ended up moving to Warner Bros. Pictures after they signed a three-picture deal with Allen in 1975.

=== Relationship of Gallico's novels to the films ===
Paul Gallico's novel The Poseidon Adventure had ended with the ship's sinking. The original film changed much of the novel's plot and ended with the ship still afloat. After the huge success of the film, Gallico was asked to write a novel that would be a sequel not to his first novel, but to the film. It would feature a new group of people entering the still capsized ship and could be made into a second film. In response, Gallico started writing Beyond the Poseidon Adventure, but he died on July 15, 1976, before completing the book. The book was published on January 1, 1978. Once again, the film that followed ended up bearing little resemblance to his book. Instead of sinking, the ship explodes, along with Svevo and his men.

=== Filming ===
Filming started in September 1978 at The Burbank Studios, with location shooting off the California coast and Catalina Island. For the year prior, the ship interior set was designed and built, based on the RMS Queen Mary.

== Reception ==
Beyond the Poseidon Adventure was universally panned by critics. On Rotten Tomatoes the film has an approval rating of 11% based on reviews from 9 critics, with an average rating of 3.50/10. On Metacritic the film has a weighted average score of 22 out of 100, based on 6 critics, indicating "generally unfavorable" reviews.

Roger Ebert gave the film one star out of four. Janet Maslin of The New York Times wrote that Irwin Allen "is so obviously ill-equipped to stage action scenes in cramped quarters that his audience winds up wishing as fervently as his characters for a chance to see the light of day". Variety wrote that the film "comes off as a virtual remake of the 1972 original, without that film's mounting suspense and excitement". Gene Siskel gave the film one star out of four and slammed it as "virtually the same story as the original disaster film", with "shoddily painted sets; tiny studio-created fires all of the same size; and dialog that could be written by a 1st-grader". Kevin Thomas of the Los Angeles Times called the film "an instance of too little too late. The sequel is painstakingly crafted and pleasant to watch but seems routine and even tedious at times, mainly because there has been so much razzle-dazzle on the screen since the S.S. Poseidon capsized—including, of course, Allen's own Towering Inferno". Jeanne Miller of the San Francisco Examiner gave the film one star and called it "a banal, witless and deadly dull sequel to The Poseidon Adventure, a true disaster without a single redeeming feature." Clyde Jeavons of The Monthly Film Bulletin wrote that the film "is not so much a sequel as a remake, and a fairly dismal, cut-price one at that, its shoddiness being risibly exemplified from the start by the almost Python-esque studio-tank storm which assails Michael Caine's see-sawing salvage tug".

== Home media ==
A region one DVD version was released on August 22, 2006. A digital version is available for rental and purchase on the PlayStation Network for the PlayStation 3, and it is also up for purchase and rental on the iTunes Store. Warner Home Video re-released the DVD via their Warner Archive Collection on June 23, 2014. On September 12, 2023, Shout! Factory re-released Beyond the Poseidon Adventure on Blu-ray, as part of the Irwin Allen: Master of Disaster Collection which additionally included the original extended cut which aired on television.
