= The Poseidon Adventure (novel) =

Novel By Paul Gallico

- First edition (publ. Coward-McCann)
- Author: Paul Gallico
- Language: English
- Genre: Adventure novel
- Published: 1969
- ISBN: 9780698103030
- OCLC: 646962610
- Followed by: Beyond the Poseidon Adventure

The Poseidon Adventure is an American adventure novel by Paul Gallico, published in 1969. It concerns the capsizing of a luxurious ocean liner, the SS Poseidon, due to an undersea earthquake that causes a 90-foot (27-meter) wave, and the desperate struggles of a handful of survivors to reach the bottom of the liner's hull before the ship sinks.

== Plot ==
Formerly the RMS Atlantis, the SS Poseidon is a luxury ocean liner from the golden age of travel, converted to a single-class, combination cargo-cruise liner. The ship is on her first North Atlantic crossing under new ownership, celebrated with a month-long Christmas voyage from Lisbon to African and South American ports. On December 26, an undersea earthquake overturns the Poseidon. The ship capsizes as it falls into the void caused by the quake displacing millions of gallons of seawater.

Trapped within the upper deck dining room, preacher Reverend Frank "Buzz" Scott suggests his fellow survivors move to the keel of the ship, where they may have a better chance of being rescued. Some decide to stay behind. The rest climb a Christmas tree with Scott to ascend into the galley area, where they meet stewards and kitchen crew. The group debates whether to try to reach a propeller shaft at the stern, or to go to the bow. A steward fears the lockers that hold the anchor chains will have flooded, and suggests trying for the engine room.

After climbing two upside-down stairways, the group comes upon "Broadway", a wide service corridor that runs the length of the ship and connects to the engine room. The posse breaks for a while whilst looking for supplies. Young Robin Shelby ventures off to find the bathroom while Tony "The Beamer" Bates and his girlfriend Pamela find the liquor closet. When the ship's emergency lighting goes out, some crew members panic and stampede; they are trampled, or killed by falling over stairway openings or into a pit where a boiler tore through several decks. After the panic, Scott's group searches for Tony, Pamela and Robin.

New York Police Detective Mike Rogo finds Tony passed out, intoxicated, and Pamela refuses to leave him. While searching for Robin, his older sister Susan is raped by Herbert, a crew member. Susan talks to Herbert, who is remorseful and ashamed, and grows to like him. Realizing the consequences of his actions, Herbert panics, runs off and falls to his doom. Susan rejoins the group and tells them nothing of what has happened. After an intense search, they make the decision to move on without Robin. His mother, Jane, breaks down and vents her long-held disgust and hatred for her husband. The Reverend, having found a Turkish oiler, guides the other survivors to the stern. They find a corridor to the engine room, which is completely submerged. Belle Rosen, a former swimming champion, swims through the corridor and finds the passage to get them to the other side. Upon their arrival, they find the engine room.

They take time to rest and save the batteries on their recently acquired flashlights. In the darkness, Linda Rogo tries to seduce the Reverend. After their rest, they see a way out, five decks up, on top of a fractured steel wall. During the difficult climb, Linda rebels and attempts to find her own way. She chooses an unstable route and falls to her death, impaled on a piece of steel. An explosion rocks the ship, and Reverend Scott, enraged, denounces God, offers himself as a sacrifice, and commits suicide. Mary Kinsale, an English spinster, screams in grief and claims they were to be married. Her fellow survivors do not know what to make of this revelation.

Mr. Martin takes charge of the group, who make their way into a propeller shaft where the steel hull is at its thinnest. The oxygen supply begins to give out, but eventually they are found. Belle Rosen has a heart attack and dies before the rescue team can reach her. The rescuers cut through the hull, and the group climb out. Manny Rosen, however, refuses to leave without Belle's remains, which are lifted out after the others have left. Once outside, the survivors see another, much larger group of survivors being removed from the bow of the ship. Most are still in their dinner clothes, in contrast to Scott's group, who are mostly in underclothing and streaked with oil.

En route to the rescue ships in lifeboats, they see Tony and Pamela, who have survived after all. Sailors from a small German tramper try to put a salvage line on the Poseidon. Mike curses them because of his World War II experiences and laughs when their efforts fail. The group goes their separate ways — Mary Kinsale and Nonnie on a ship back to the UK; Mike, Manny and Hubie Muller back to New York, Martin back to Chicago, Dick, Jane and Susan back to Michigan; and the Turk back to Turkey. Aboard the American ship, they watch the Poseidon sink. Jane, giving up hope, silently grieves the loss of her son. Susan, meanwhile, dreams of going to Hull in the UK to visit Herbert's parents, hoping to be pregnant with his child.

== Characters ==
- Frank "Buzz" Scott – reverend and former Princeton all-star athlete.
- Mike Rogo – New York City Police Department detective
- Linda Rogo – washed-up Broadway actress; she has a destructive persona and is Mike Rogo's wife.
- Emmanuel "Manny" Rosen – retired delicatessen owner and old acquaintance of Rogo.
- Belle Rosen – former W.S.A. swim champion and Manny Rosen's wife.
- Mary Kinsale – head bookkeeper of the Camberley branch of Browne's Bank in England.
- Richard "Dick" Shelby – Vice President Cranborne Motors of Detroit, Michigan
- Jane Shelby – homemaker and Richard Shelby's wife.
- Susan Shelby – 17-year-old high school student
- Robin Shelby – 10-year-old elementary school student
- Hubert "Hubie" Muller – wealthy playboy socialite
- Nona "Nonnie" Parry – chorus dancer for the ship's can-can group "The Gresham Girls".
- James Martin – proprietor, Elite Haberdashery in Evanston, Illinois
- Tony "The Beamer" Bates – partner in a stockbroking firm and raging alcoholic.
- Pamela Reid – an unemployed woman who is infatuated with "The Beamer".
- Kemal – Turkish engine room oiler
- Acre – steward
- Dr. Caravello – ship's doctor
- Marco – Caravello's orderly
- Herbert – young seaman from Hull.
- Mr. Kyrenos – third engineer
- Mrs. Wilma Lewis – widow, having a meaningless love affair with James Martin.
- Marie – ship's hairdresser
- Pappas – seaman
- Peters – steward
- Williams – steward
- Commander Thorpe – skipper of USS Monroe
- Lieutenant Worden – Navy doctor
- Harper – Thorpe's radioman

== Film adaptations ==
The book was first adapted into a feature film in 1972 with the story continued by a direct sequel in 1979, both produced by Irwin Allen. A remake was released as a television special in 2005 and another remake as a feature film in 2006.

- The Poseidon Adventure (1972)
- Beyond the Poseidon Adventure (1979)
- The Poseidon Adventure (2005)
- Poseidon (2006)
