= The Poseidon Adventure (1972 film) =

1972 film by Ronald Neame

- Theatrical release poster by Mort Künstler
- Directed by: Ronald Neame
- Screenplay by: Stirling Silliphant; Wendell Mayes
- Based on: The Poseidon Adventure (1969 novel) by Paul Gallico
- Produced by: Irwin Allen
- Starring: Gene Hackman; Ernest Borgnine; Red Buttons; Carol Lynley; Roddy McDowall; Stella Stevens; Shelley Winters; Jack Albertson; Pamela Sue Martin; Arthur O'Connell; Eric Shea; Leslie Nielsen
- Cinematography: Harold E. Stine
- Edited by: Harold F. Kress
- Music by: John Williams
- Production companies: Kent Productions, Ltd.
- Distributed by: 20th Century Fox
- Release date: December 12, 1972
- Running time: 117 minutes
- Country: United States
- Language: English
- Budget: $4.7 million
- Box office: $125 million

The Poseidon Adventure is a 1972 American disaster film directed by Ronald Neame, produced by Irwin Allen, and based on Paul Gallico's 1969 novel. It stars an ensemble cast including five Oscar winners: Gene Hackman, Ernest Borgnine, Jack Albertson, Shelley Winters, and Red Buttons, along with Carol Lynley, Roddy McDowall, Stella Stevens, Pamela Sue Martin, Eric Shea, Arthur O'Connell, and Leslie Nielsen.

The plot centers on the fictional SS Poseidon, an aging luxury liner on its final voyage from New York City to Athens, before it is scrapped. On New Year's Day, it is overturned by a wave. Passengers and crew are trapped inside, and a preacher attempts to lead a small group of survivors to safety.

The film is in the vein of other all-star disaster films of the early- through mid-1970s, such as Airport (1970), Earthquake and The Towering Inferno (both 1974). It was released in December 1972 and became the second highest-grossing film of the year, earning over $125 million worldwide. It was nominated for eight Academy Awards, and went on to win two Oscars, a Golden Globe Award, a British Academy Film Award, and a Motion Picture Sound Editors Award. A sequel, Beyond the Poseidon Adventure, also based on a novel by Gallico, was released in 1979.

== Plot ==
The SS Poseidon, an aging ocean liner slated for retirement, is sailing from New York to Athens on her final voyage before being scrapped. Despite safety concerns from Captain Harrison, Linarcos, the new owner's representative, insists he go full speed to save money, preventing Poseidon from taking on ballast.

Reverend Frank Scott, a minister who believes "God helps those who help themselves", is traveling to a new parish in Africa as punishment for unorthodox views. Detective Lieutenant Mike Rogo and wife Linda, a former prostitute, deal with her seasickness. Susan Shelby and her younger brother Robin are traveling to meet their parents. Interested in how the ship works, Robin frequently visits the bridge and engine room. Retired Jewish store owner Manny Rosen and wife Belle are going to Israel to meet their grandson for the first time. Haberdasher James Martin is a love-shy, health-conscious bachelor. The ship's singer, Nonnie Parry, is rehearsing for the New Year's celebration.

As passengers gather in the dining room to celebrate, the captain is called to the bridge in response to a report of an undersea earthquake. Seconds after midnight, he is informed by the ships lookout of an "enormous wall of water" headed directly for the ship. After issuing a distress signal, the ship is hit broadside and capsizes. The escape route can only be found "upwards", at the outer hull, now above water.

In the dining room, survivors take stock of their predicament. Acres, an injured waiter, is trapped at the galley door now high above. Scott attempts to convince everybody to travel with him to the ship's hull, which is only 1 inch (2.5 cm) thick in one small place of that hull. The ship's purser, on the other hand, tells the crowd to wait for help. Most of the survivors side with the purser. The Rosens, the Rogos, Susan, Robin, Acres, Nonnie, and Martin agree to go with Scott, using a Christmas tree as a ladder. After the group climbs to the galley, there are various explosions. As seawater floods the dining room, those remaining attempt to climb the tree, but their weight causes it to fall. Water fills the room, and the ship begins sinking.

Scott leads his group toward the engine room. While they are climbing a ladder inside a ventilation shaft, the ship rocks from more explosions. Acres falls and perishes. Leaving the shaft, the group meets a band of survivors led by the ship's doctor, heading toward the bow. Scott believes they are heading for their doom. However, Rogo wants to follow them and gives Scott fifteen minutes to find the engine room. Despite taking longer than allowed, Scott succeeds.

The engine room is on the other side of a flooded corridor. Belle, a former competitive swimmer, volunteers to go through, but Scott refuses her and dives in. Halfway through, a panel collapses on him. The survivors notice the delay, and Belle dives in. She frees Scott, and they make it to the other side, where Belle suffers a heart attack and dies. Rogo swims over to make sure Belle and Scott are all right, then leads the rest over. When Manny finds Belle's body, he is unwilling to go on. However, Scott gives Manny her pendant, reminding him that he has a reason to live.

Scott leads the survivors to the propeller shaft room's watertight door, but additional explosions cause Linda to lose her grip and fall to her death. Heartbroken, Rogo blames Scott. A ruptured pipe releases steam, blocking their escape. Scott rants at God for the survivors' deaths while leaping across a pool of flaming oil, grabbing onto the burning-hot valve wheel to shut down the steam. Dangling from the wheel, Scott shouts at a despondent Rogo to get the group through the final door. Scott's grip on the wheel eventually releases and he falls to his death.

Rogo leads the remaining survivors through the door and into the propeller shaft tunnel. They hear a noise from outside and bang on the hull to attract attention. The French Coast Guard cut through the hull, assist the group, reveal that no one else survived, and fly them to safety.

== Cast ==
- Gene Hackman as Reverend Frank Scott
- Ernest Borgnine as Det. Lieutenant Mike Rogo
- Red Buttons as James Martin
- Carol Lynley as Nonnie Parry, a singer
- Roddy McDowall as Acres
- Stella Stevens as Linda Rogo, Mike's wife and a former prostitute
- Shelley Winters as Belle Rosen, Manny's wife
- Jack Albertson as Manny Rosen, Belle's husband
- Pamela Sue Martin as Susan Shelby, Robin's older sister
- Arthur O'Connell as Chaplain John
- Eric Shea as Robin Shelby, Susan's younger brother
- Leslie Nielsen as Captain Harrison
- Fred Sadoff as Linarcos
- Byron Webster as Purser
- Jan Arvan as Dr. Caravello
- Sheila Mathews as Nurse
- John Crawford as Chief Engineer
- Bob Hastings as M.C.
- Erik Nelson as Officer Tinkham
- Charles Bateman as First Officer Larsen
- Ernie F. Orsatti as Terry
- Paul Stader as Sparks

== Production ==
=== Development and writing ===
The novel by Paul Gallico was inspired by a 1937 trip the author took on the RMS Queen Mary , during which the ship turned on its side in high waves. The film rights to the novel were acquired by Avco Embassy Pictures in 1969, and Irwin Allen's Kent Productions signed a deal with them to make three movies, including The Poseidon Adventure. Avco Embassy cancelled the production, and it moved to 20th Century-Fox, which contributed half of the budget. Steve Broidy and Sherrill Corwin helped finance the rest.

Wendell Mayes recalled he did the project for the money. "I knew that it was going to be a big, bad, popular motion picture. I was the first writer on it. After I did a couple of rewrites, I asked the producer, Irwin Allen, to please relieve me of the job. I had done all I could. Then he brought in Stirling Silliphant. Stirling worked on it and changed it quite a bit."

=== Casting ===
Sally Kellerman was considered for the role of Linda Rogo. Petula Clark was offered the role of Nonnie Parry but turned it down. Gene Wilder was originally cast as James Martin but then later dropped out. Burt Lancaster was offered the role of Reverend Frank Scott but turned it down, as he did not feel the role was right for him.

=== Filming ===
Filming ran from April to July 1972. Parts of the movie were filmed aboard the Queen Mary, permanently berthed in Long Beach, California, while sets replicating various parts of the ship were built at the Fox Studio Lot. The film was shot mostly in-sequence.

For scenes set during the storm, cameras mounted on gyros were used to simulate the rocking of the ship. The set for the dining room – the focus of the film as the ship capsizes – was designed to match that of the Queen Mary, but was built in sections that could be tilted by a forklift to simulate the ship rolling over, then mounted upside down for the scenes immediately afterward. The cast mostly performed their own stunts. A 22-foot-long scale model of the ship was used for exterior shots, filmed in a studio water tank.

== Music ==
The score for the film was composed and conducted by John Williams, and performed by the Hollywood Studio Symphony. The song "The Morning After", written by Al Kasha and Joel Hirschhorn, won the 1972 Academy Award for Best Original Song at the 45th Academy Awards in March 1973. It was performed in the film by Renée Armand, dubbing for Carol Lynley. A version of "The Morning After" performed by Maureen McGovern became a hit single in 1973.

There was no soundtrack album at the time of the film's release. The score was first released as a CD by Film Score Monthly in July 1998. A remastered version was released by La-La Land Records on April 20, 2010. La-La Land Records released a second, newly remastered edition of Williams' score on December 3, 2019, as part of a boxset also including Williams' scores for Earthquake and The Towering Inferno.

== Release ==
The Poseidon Adventure opened Tuesday, December 12, 1972, as the first film at the newly opened National Theatre in Times Square in New York City.

=== Home media ===
It has been released on VHS, Betamax, Laserdisc, DVD, and Blu-ray.

== Reception ==
=== Critical reception ===
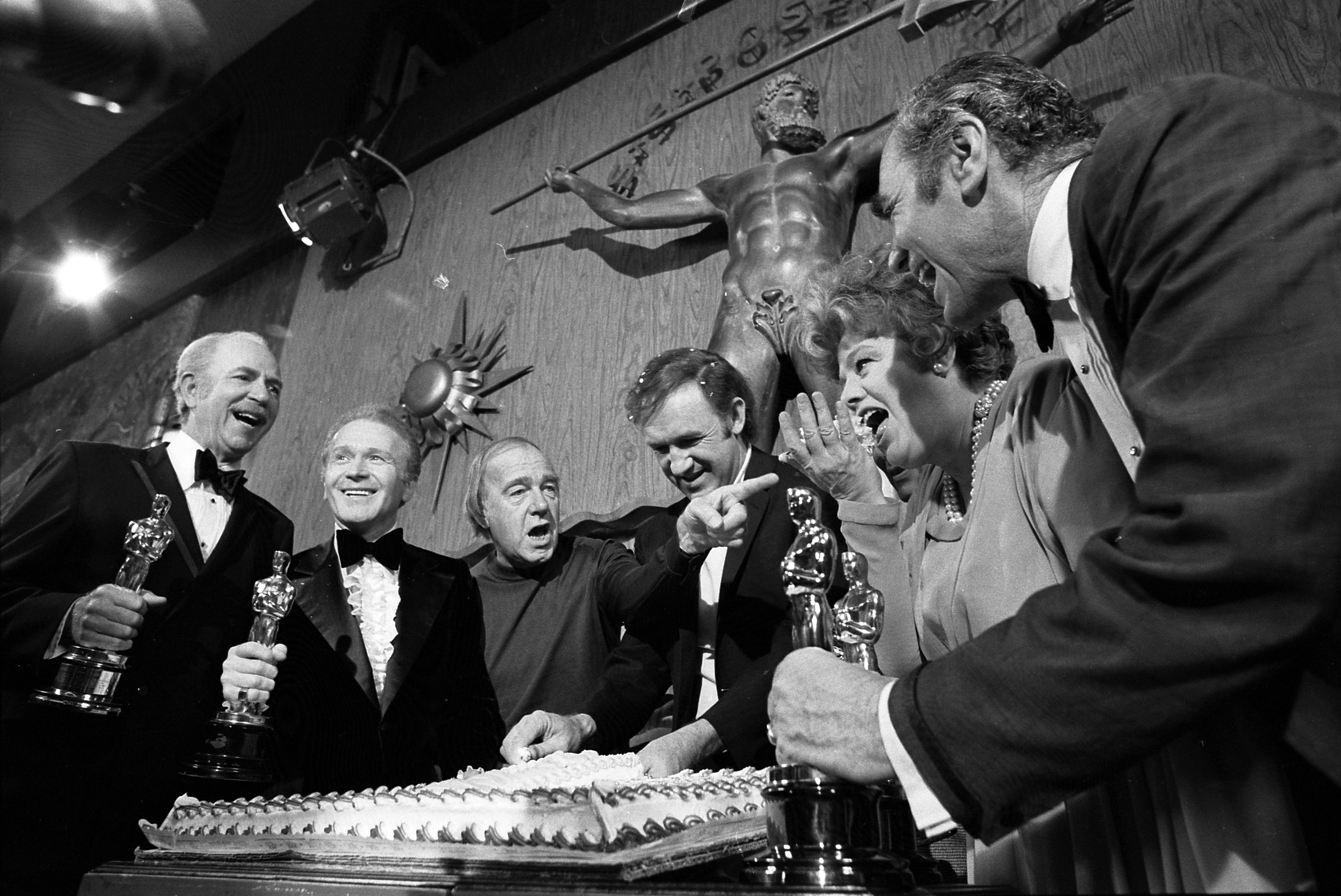
The cast of the film celebrating Gene Hackman's Oscar win for The French Connection. L-to-R: Jack Albertson, Red Buttons, Ronald Neame, Hackman, Shelley Winters, Ernest Borgnine.

Review aggregator Rotten Tomatoes reports that 82% of 33 critics gave the film a positive review. The critical consensus reads: "The Poseidon Adventure exemplifies the disaster film done right, going down smoothly with ratcheting tension and a terrific ensemble to give the peril a distressingly human dimension". Metacritic gave the film a score of 70 based on 10 reviews, indicating "generally favorable reviews".

Roger Ebert gave the film two-and-a-half stars out of four and called it "the kind of movie you know is going to be awful, and yet somehow you gotta see it, right?" A. H. Weiler of The New York Times wrote that "though tensions slacken and credibility is strained here, realistic technical effects make the stricken ship and the efforts of its survivors to escape a fairly spellbinding adventure". Variety called the film "a highly imaginative and lustily-produced meller" with "some of the most exciting sequences seen in years". Gene Siskel gave the film three stars out of four and wrote that "the film's technical excellence—special effects, production design, and the stars doing their own stunts—holds one's interest". Charles Champlin of the Los Angeles Times wrote that "the special effects—the genuinely remarkable production values and technical wizardries—sweep everything else aside. Are the characters as gaudy and thin as cereal boxes? Is the dialog banal and shrill? Is the moralizing heavy-handed and relentless? Is the hokum a bit thick even in the context of a showmanship special? Well, yes. But who cares?" Gary Arnold of The Washington Post wrote that the film was "strictly formula hokum, but reasonably diverting if one doesn't ask for more than the filmmakers care to give—that is, for imaginative writing and direction. As usual, only the special effects and set designers and the stunt men have been permitted to be playful and creative".

=== Box office ===
In addition to the National Theatre in New York City, it also opened at the Beekman Theatre in New York City. In its first five days in New York City, it grossed $70,168. It also opened in 10 theatres in Los Angeles and 11 theatres in Miami on the Friday and had grossed $272,164 by the end of the weekend. The film expanded to 205 engagements by Christmas Day with a gross to that date of $2,604,168 in the United States and Canada which made it the number one film at the US box office. It remained at number one through the New Year period but was displaced by The Getaway for one week before returning to number one for 8 consecutive weeks. It spent another two weeks at number one for a total of 12 weeks atop the box office. The film went on to earn theatrical rentals of $40 million in the United States and Canada in 1973 being the highest-grossing film of the year. The film was reissued in June 1974 and was number one at the US box office in its first week. It earned rentals of $75 million worldwide, for a worldwide gross of over $125 million.

=== Awards and nominations ===
Award	Category	Nominee(s)	Result	Ref.
Academy Awards	Best Supporting Actress	Shelley Winters	Nominated	
Academy Awards	Best Art Direction	Art Direction: William J. Creber; Set Decoration: Raphaël Bretton	Nominated	
Academy Awards	Best Cinematography	Harold E. Stine	Nominated	
Academy Awards	Best Costume Design	Paul Zastupnevich	Nominated	
Academy Awards	Best Film Editing	Harold F. Kress	Nominated	
Academy Awards	Best Original Dramatic Score	John Williams	Nominated	
Academy Awards	Best Song – Original for the Picture	"The Morning After"; Music and Lyrics by Al Kasha and Joel Hirschhorn	Won	
Academy Awards	Best Sound	Theodore Soderberg and Herman Lewis	Nominated	
Academy Awards	Best Visual Effects (Special Achievement Award)	L. B. Abbott and A. D. Flowers	Won	
American Cinema Editors Awards	Best Edited Feature Film	Harold F. Kress	Nominated	
British Academy Film Awards	Best Actor in a Leading Role	Gene Hackman (also for The French Connection)	Won	
British Academy Film Awards	Best Actress in a Supporting Role	Shelley Winters	Nominated	
Golden Globe Awards	Best Motion Picture – Drama		Nominated	
Golden Globe Awards	Best Supporting Actress – Motion Picture	Shelley Winters	Won	
Golden Globe Awards	Best Original Score – Motion Picture	John Williams	Nominated	
Golden Globe Awards	Best Original Song – Motion Picture	"The Morning After"; Music and Lyrics by Al Kasha and Joel Hirschhorn	Nominated	
Golden Reel Awards	Best Sound Editing – Dialogue		Won	
Satellite Awards	Best DVD Extras		Nominated	

=== TV premiere ===
When the film made its network television premiere on ABC on October 27, 1974, it earned a Nielsen rating of 39.0 and an audience share of 62%, making it the sixth-highest rated film to ever air on network television.

=== Legacy ===
The Poseidon Adventure has become a cult film. It is in the vein of other all-star disaster films of the 1970s, such as Airport, and later ones like Earthquake (1974) and The Towering Inferno (1974). It is listed in Golden Raspberry Award founder John Wilson's book, The Official Razzie Movie Guide, as one of The 100 Most Enjoyably Bad Movies Ever Made.

Mad's September 1973 edition satirized the movie as "The Poopsidedown Adventure". Its cover was the first Mad cover not to show Alfred E. Neuman's face. Instead, he is shown floating upside down with only his feet in sight jutting out from an SS Poseidon life preserver. It was the best-selling issue in the magazine's history.

== Sequel and remakes ==
A 1979 sequel, Beyond the Poseidon Adventure, which was also based on a novel by Gallico, was released later with an equally star-studded cast.

The Poseidon Adventure has been remade twice: as a television film in 2005 with the same name and as a theatrical release titled Poseidon in 2006.

== See also ==
- List of American films of 1972
- List of films set around New Year
- The Last Voyage (1960)
- Survival film, about the film genre, with a list of related films
