= Plot =

Plot or plotting may refer to:

== Art, media and entertainment ==
- Plot (narrative), the connected story elements of a piece of fiction

=== Music ===
- The Plot (album), a 1976 album by jazz trumpeter Enrico Rava
- The Plot (band), a band formed in 2003

=== Gaming ===
- Plotting (video game), a 1989 Taito puzzle video game, also called Flipull
- The Plot (video game), a platform game released in 1988 for the Amstrad CPC and Sinclair Spectrum
- The Plot (card game), a Patience-type card game

=== Books ===
- Plotting (non-fiction), a 1939 book on writing by Jack Woodford
- The Plot, a 2023 book by British politician Nadine Dorries
- The Plot (novel), a 2021 mystery by Jean Hanff Korelitz

=== Films ===
- Plot (film), a 1973 French-Italian film
- The Plot (film), a 2024 South Korean crime thriller film

== Graphics ==
- Plot (graphics), a graphical technique for representing a data set
- Plot (radar), a graphic display that shows all collated data from a ship's on-board sensors
- Plot plan, a type of drawing which shows existing and proposed conditions for a given area

== Land ==
- Plot (land), a piece of land used for building on
  - Burial plot, a piece of land a person is buried in
- Quadrat, a defined area of land used for an ecological study

== Other uses ==
- Robert Plot (1640–1696), English naturalist

== See also ==
- Plott (disambiguation)
- Conspiracy (disambiguation)
- Plotter (disambiguation)
- Plot Twist (disambiguation)
- Motion planning, a term used in robotics for the process of detailing a task into atomic motions
- Plotting board, a mechanical device to track a target and project its future position
- Plat, a map
