= Conspirator =

In the English language, a conspirator is a party to a conspiracy. In a criminal conspiracy, each alleged party is a "co-conspirator".

Conspirator(s) may refer to:

== Books ==
- The Conspirators (Dumas and Maquet novel), an 1843 French historical novel by Alexandre Dumas and Auguste Maquet
- The Conspirators, an 1899 novel by Robert W. Chambers
- The Conspirators (Prokosch novel), a 1943 novel by Frederic Prokosch
- The Conspirators, a 1967 novel by William Haggard
- Conspirator (novel), a 2009 American sci-fi novel set in C. J. Cherryh's Foreigner universe

== Films ==
- The Conspirators (1924 film), British silent drama directed by Sinclair Hill
- The Conspirators (1944 film), American World War II spy drama directed by Jean Negulesco
- Conspirator (1949 film), British-American espionage thriller directed by Victor Saville
- Nell'anno del Signore (English title: The Conspirators), a 1969 Italian historical drama directed by Luigi Magni
- The Conspirator, a 2010 American historical drama directed by Robert Redford
- Conspirators (film), a 2013 Hong Kong crime thriller directed by Oxide Pang

== Television ==
- "Conspirators", The Brothers (1972) series 3, episode 11 (1974)
- "The Conspirator", The Lazarus Man episode 5 (1996)
- "The Conspirators", Broken Arrow season 1, episode 11 (1956)
- "The Conspirators", Cannon season 4, episode 14 (1975)
- "The Conspirators", Cheyenne season 3, episode 2 (1957)
- "The Conspirators", Columbo season 7, episode 5 (1978)
- "The Conspirators", Danger Man series 1, episode 21 (1961)
- "The Conspirators", Heil Caesar episode 1 (1974)
- "The Conspirators", Medical Center season 5, episode 21 (1974)
- "The Conspirators", The F.B.I. season 2, episode 20 (1967)

== Other uses ==
- The Forty Conspirators, also known as the Conspirators, a Portuguese nationalist group during the Iberian Union
- The Conspirators (band), a British northern indie / folk band

== See also ==
- Conspirateurs, a French board game
- Conspiracy (disambiguation)
