= Plotter (disambiguation) =

A plotter is a computer printer for printing vector graphics.

Plotter may also refer to:

- Plotter (instrument), an instrument that marks positions on a map or chart
- Plotter (RAF), a person who records the movement of military aircraft in an Operations Room
- Navigator, a person who marks positions on a map or chart

== See also ==
- Plot (disambiguation)
- Conspiracy (disambiguation)
