= List of The F.B.I. episodes =

This is a list of episodes for the television series The F.B.I., which aired for nine seasons from 1965 to 1974. Actor Efrem Zimbalist Jr. starred throughout the entire series as Inspector Lewis Erskine. The stories were fictional but inspired by actual FBI case files, and FBI Director J. Edgar Hoover allowed the producers to film some scenes at the FBI headquarters. All episodes were filmed in color.

== Series overview ==
Season	Episodes	Originally released	
Season	Episodes	First released	Last released
1	32	September 19, 1965	May 8, 1966
2	29	September 18, 1966	April 16, 1967
3	27	September 17, 1967	April 28, 1968
4	26	September 22, 1968	March 30, 1969
5	26	September 14, 1969	March 8, 1970
6	26	September 20, 1970	March 21, 1971
7	26	September 12, 1971	March 19, 1972
8	26	September 17, 1972	April 1, 1973
9	23	September 16, 1973	April 28, 1974

== Episodes ==
=== Season 1 (1965–66) ===
No. overall	No. in season	Title	Directed by	Written by	Original release date
1	1	"The Monster"	William A. Graham	Norman Jolley	September 19, 1965
Case file #76-3342-J: In the first episode, Erskine and Rhodes are assigned to track down Francis Jerome (Jeffrey Hunter), an extortionist who has escaped from a federal prison in Pennsylvania. Erskine must also confront a number of personal issues when a woman involved in the case takes a liking to him.
2	2	"Image in a Cracked Mirror"	William A. Graham	Anthony Wilson	September 26, 1965
Case file #29-68954-G: Erskine and Rhodes are assigned to track down a bank embezzler (Jack Klugman). The title stems from the fact that Erskine recognizes traits he shares with the embezzler, such as the fact both men served during the Korean War and both are fathers whose wife has died.
3	3	"A Mouthful of Dust"	Don Medford	Earl Mack	October 3, 1965
Case file #70-68307-C: Joe Cloud (Alejandro Rey), a Native American who served under Erskine during the Korean War, kills a man who was trying to rape his wife. Cloud flees custody and Erskine attempts to bring him in while trying to keep Cloud from harm.
4	4	"Slow March Up a Steep Hill"	William A. Graham	Charles Larson	October 10, 1965
Case file #91-77270-X: Erskine faces problems in his personal life and at work at the same time. His 19-year-old daughter, Barbara, insists on marrying his partner, Rhodes, right now. Meanwhile, assistant director Arthur Ward questions Erskine's approach to catching a bank robber; a man has already confessed to the crimes, but Erskine is convinced the illegitimate son of another bank robber is the real culprit.
5	5	"The Insolents"	Don Medford	Theodore Apstein	October 17, 1965
Case file #45-47339-Y: Rhodes must confront his own emotions about an incident in his past as he investigates a spoiled young playboy (James York) accused of a murder on a cruise ship.
6	6	"To Free My Enemy"	William A. Graham	Norman Jolley & Ken Kolb	October 24, 1965
A pornographer (James Gregory) that Erskine has been pursuing is about to flee the country, but is kidnapped before he can do so. Now the FBI man has to smash the kidnapping plot, although it will mean helping the pornographer escape.
7	7	"The Problem of the Honorable Wife"	Don Medford	Jo Pagano	October 31, 1965
Case file #98-63520-M: Erskine and Rhodes investigate a group of saboteurs in San Francisco. The title refers to the wife of one of the saboteurs; the wife (Miiko Taka), who is Japanese, is unaware of her husband's illegal activities.
8	8	"Courage of a Conviction"	Don Medford	Oscar Millard	November 7, 1965
Case file #87-633462-C: In St. Louis, Erskine and Rhodes arrest a man they think is a notorious check forger. The arrest has been made with the assistance of an old friend of Erskine's (Edward Andrews), but the FBI investigator has doubts they've really arrested the right man.
9	9	"The Exiles"	William A. Graham	Robert Leslie Bellem & David W. Rintels (as "Pat Riddle")	November 14, 1965
Case file #2-46675-R: Exiles from a South American country are trying to organize a coup of their former land. What they don't know is they have a mole among them: Erskine is assigned to infiltrate the exiles, who are based in Miami, by pretending to be a mercenary.
10	10	"The Giant Killer"	Don Medford	Mark Rodgers	November 21, 1965
Case file #52-19223-W: A deranged man (Robert Duvall) is planning on destroying an American test rocket. He has left a series of cryptic radio messages across the U.S.
11	11	"All the Streets Are Silent"	William A. Graham	Mark Rodgers	November 28, 1965
Case file #52-499362-M: In California, a gang led by the Murtaugh brothers (Burt Reynolds and Joe Maross) has stolen weapons from the U.S. military. Erskine and Rhodes are assigned to capture the gang.
12	12	"An Elephant Is Like a Rope"	Don Medford	Robert Leslie Bellem & Lee Erwin	December 5, 1965
Case file #87-52739-X: A young man (Beau Bridges) drives to FBI headquarters from Virginia. He is carrying a large amount of cash and has been shot. He also can't remember his own identity. The title stems from the story of blind men trying to establish what an elephant looks like by feeling different parts of the animal; that story summarizes the challenge facing Erskine and Rhodes as they try to reconstruct what happened. On top of that, a pair of hit men (Ted Knight and Paul Mantee) are stalking the boy.
13	13	"How to Murder an Iron Horse"	Christian Nyby	Don Brinkley	December 12, 1965
Case file #9-74219-C: A disturbed young man (David Macklin) blows up a freight train. He is now blackmailing the railroad -- he'll do the same to a passenger train unless he is paid $100,000.
14	14	"Pound of Flesh"	Christian Nyby	Norman Jolley & Tom Seller	December 19, 1965
Case file #70-74476-X: The wife of a U.S. military chaplain (Leslie Nielsen) is murdered. The accused (Bruce Dern) is a soldier with a shaky record. The town surrounding the base is on edge, complicating the investigation of Erskine and Rhodes.
15	15	"The Hijackers"	Don Medford	Norman Lessing	December 26, 1965
Case file #15-9436-S: Erskine and Rhodes are sent to Milwaukee to investigate a truck hijacking. The FBI thinks it is the work of an interstate hijacking ring. In reality, it was organized by an employee (Arthur O'Connell) of a trucking company who was forced to retire. At the same time, Erskine tries to make time to visit his uncle (Cecil Kellaway), who suffers from being alone.
16	16	"The Forests of the Night"	Christian Nyby	Charles Larson & Sy Salkowitz	January 2, 1966
Case file #9-26080-X: In Oregon, members of a religious colony have incurred jealousy and ire from residents of a town. The young son of the colony's leader has reported he was beaten. Erskine and Rhodes are thrust into the middle of the situation, which is as combustible as the nearby forests which have endured a 97-day drought.
17	17	"The Chameleon"	Don Medford	Norman Jolley	January 9, 1966
Case file #29-31091-C: Erskine and Rhodes are tracking a man (James Daly) who seduces and then kills wealthy widows. Can they reach him before he kills again? It turns out the killer has deep psychological issues about being adopted. Erskine is able to use that fact to his advantage in the investigation.
18	18	"The Sacrifice"	Christian Nyby	Andy Lewis	January 16, 1966
Case file #65-9525-X: A defecting Soviet diplomat informs the FBI that a major Southern California defense contractor is the source of a security leak. Erskine and Rhodes assume cover identities. Meanwhile, the leader of a Soviet spy ring (Albert Paulsen) prepares to sacrifice one of the collaborators to throw the FBI off the scent.
19	19	"Special Delivery"	Ralph Senensky	Samuel Newman	January 23, 1966
Case file #91-42238-P: The FBI investigates a group that transports fugitives out of the country. Erskine, again assuming an undercover identity, is sharing a ride with a wounded criminal (Earl Holliman) and his girlfriend.
20	20	"Quantico"	Christian Nyby	Ron Bishop & Don Brinkley	January 30, 1966
Case file #52-7672-S: An FBI trainee, one of the best who has ever gone through the FBI academy in Quantico, Virginia, discovers a cousin is the man who is trying to blow up a federal building in Washington.
21	21	"The Spy-Master"	Richard Donner	Anthony Spinner	February 6, 1966
Case file #65-4948-X: A U.S. diplomat is approached by the Chinese government to provide sensitive information; the Chinese are specifically seeking the contents of a document known as the Forsythe Memo. Erskine impersonates the diplomat to infiltrate the spy ring.
22	22	"The Baby Sitter"	Christian Nyby	Leonard Kantor	February 13, 1966
Case file #7-1101-D: A mentally ill woman (Colleen Dewhurst), who is babysitting an infant, abducts the child. Erskine and Rhodes track the woman across several states. The FBI agents must figure out the kidnapper's motivation and why the date of April 2 is so significant to her.
23	23	"Flight to Harbin"	Don Medford & Christian Nyby	Gene L. Coon & Charles Larson	February 27, 1966
Case file #164-4391-K: A man (Arthur Hill) hijacks a plane bound for Seattle. He forces it to fly to Alaska, where it is to refuel before heading to Harbin, China. The hijacker turns out to be a U.S. scientist. Assistant Director Ward tells Erskine the man and his knowledge must not be allowed to reach China -- at any cost.
24	24	"The Man Who Went Mad by Mistake"	Ralph Senensky	Robert Leslie Bellem & Daniel B. Ullman	March 6, 1966
Case file #115-28414-T: Chicago businessman Mark Tabor (J. D. Cannon), who has ties to organized crime, is about to go on trial for fraud. Tabor narrowly escapes a hit attempt, and has himself committed to an asylum. Erskine poses as a patient to prove that Tabor is faking.
25	25	"The Divided Man"	Don Medford	David Duncan & Norman Jolley	March 20, 1966
Case file #98-81829-M: Roger Leroy Mason (Bradford Dillman), a research chemist, cracks under pressure from both his job and personal life. He has sabotaged one facility of a chemical company that is interested in bidding on a process his firm has developed. That incident resulted in a massive fire. The FBI races to find Mason before other chemical facilities are destroyed.
26	26	"The Defector: Part 1"	Christian Nyby	Norman Lessing	March 27, 1966
Case file #65-22317-H: Dr. Gregory Holman (George Voskovec) is in Washington playing in a chess tournament. He is also an intelligence operative for an Eastern European country and may be ready to defect to the United States. Seemingly killed in an explosion, Holman is actually alive and on the run, and both countries are trying to find him.
27	27	"The Defector: Part 2"	Christian Nyby	Norman Lessing	April 3, 1966
Erskine and his team finally track down Holman, who won't defect until he's sure that his children, who are still in his home country, are safe.
28	28	"The Tormentors"	Jesse Hibbs	Anthony Spinner	April 10, 1966
Case file #7-4929-D: Dan Winslow (Kurt Russell), the son of a rich man, is kidnapped by the mentally unstable Dupree (Wayne Rogers), who wants $300,000 and has no intention of letting Dan go free. Erskine must contend with Dan's bull-headed father (Lew Ayres), who wants to do things his own way, which includes offering a large reward for information about the kidnapping.
29	29	"The Animal"	Christian Nyby	Mark Rodgers	April 17, 1966
Case file #76-2947-C: The murderous Earl Clayton (Charles Bronson) leads four other criminals in an escape from a New Mexico jail. Erskine and Rhodes are sent after Clayton, who is in a remote lodge with hostages.
30	30	"The Plunderers"	Ralph Senensky	William Fay	April 24, 1966
Case file #91-62290-H: A bank in Baltimore is robbed. The crime was obviously well planned, yet the criminals only steal $12,000 when much more could have been taken. Erskine and Rhodes dig deeper to find a deceased bank robber in the 1940s would rob a small bank as a practice run before striking a richer target. Now, the FBI must comb through all the dead robber's cell mates to find who is adopting his tactics. A missing button from the Baltimore robbery will prove to be a major clue.
31	31	"The Bomb That Walked Like a Man"	Christian Nyby	Charles Larson & Richard Morgan	May 1, 1966
Case file #7-76881-H: Dale Hillman (Robert Drivas) kidnaps and kills the daughter of a police chief. The reason: Hillman had been rejected while applying for a position with the department because of an eye defect. The FBI is called into the case. In the meantime, Hillman joins an extremist group. Erskine infiltrates the group to get the evidence needed to put Hillman away for good.
32	32	"The Hiding Place"	Don Medford	Robert Leslie Bellem	May 8, 1966
Erskine and Rhodes are sent to a small town in Oregon with a predominant Asian American population. Evidence has surfaced that one of its residents may have been a traitor during World War II, serving as a Japanese officer without ever renouncing his U.S. citizenship. The one-time officer also was involved in torture during the war. To find the man, the agents eventually must seek the aid of one of the torture victims from the war.

=== Season 2 (1966–67) ===
No. overall	No. in season	Title	Directed by	Written by	Original release date
33	1	"The Price of Death"	Paul Wendkos	David W. Rintels	September 18, 1966
Case file #7-23938-C: A gang of kidnappers preys on middle-class families; based in Reno, they identify men who have won money gambling, then kidnap their children.
34	2	"The Escape"	Ralph Senensky	Mark Rodgers	October 2, 1966
Case file #89-14243-D: Convicted murderer Larry Drake (Roy Thinnes) is freed during a brazen escape that results in the deaths of three law-enforcement officers, one of whom was a good friend of Inspector Erskine.
35	3	"The Assassin"	Ralph Senensky	John McGreevey & Anthony Spinner	October 9, 1966
Case file #65-16842-C: Bishop John Atwood (Dean Jagger), a peace activist, is coming to the U.S. to deliver a speech. He has been targeted for assassination by Anton Christopher (William Windom), who has never been photographed. Neither the FBI nor the bishop knows that one of the bishop's closest friends is part of the plot.
36	4	"The Cave-In"	Paul Wendkos	Andy Lewis	October 16, 1966
Case file #98-33934-R: The FBI is called in to investigate a case of sabotage at a tungsten mine in New Mexico; the bureau is concerned because the metal is vital for U.S. defense and aerospace efforts. But the sabotage has nothing to do with the Cold War. Rather, it is the work of Tom Rule (John McIntire), whose son was killed at the mine, and who wants to prevent his grandson from working there.
37	5	"The Scourge"	Paul Wendkos	Norman Jolley	October 23, 1966
Case file #92-5843-A: Erskine and Rhodes are investigating Johnny Albin (Robert Duvall), a "juicer" who makes loans to desperate businessmen and then uses his leverage to take control of their companies for Cosa Nostra boss Mark Vincent. Erskine hopes to use Albin to get to Vincent, who controls a savings-and-loan and other legitimate business fronts.
38	6	"The Plague Merchant"	Lewis Allen	Barré Lyndon	October 30, 1966
Case file #87-32746-J: A chemist (Arthur Hill), facing escalating medical bills because his daughter may lose her leg, steals flasks he thinks contains a new lotion. In reality, he has taken a powerful bacteria that will wipe out all forms of life within a certain area. A spy, Jago (Michael Strong), wants to sell the bacteria to a country hostile to the United States. Erskine and Rhodes are dispatched to track down the missing flasks which have the potential to wipe out millions of lives.
39	7	"Ordeal"	Ralph Senensky	Robert Bloomfield	November 6, 1966
Case file #87-78550-L: Thieves steal an experimental form of nitrogylcerin, which is especially volatile. A guard is killed in the robbery and one of the thieves is also killed because he can't take the stress. The thieves recruit Carl Munger, an experienced truck driver who has hauled nitrogylcerin before and needs the money. Rhodes, posing as an out-of-work truck driver, wins Munger's trust and joins him in hauling the explosive chemical.
40	8	"Collision Course"	Christian Nyby	Leonard Kantor & Charles Larson	November 13, 1966
Case file #88-36432-S: Frank Schroeder (Jack Lord) is hitchhiking, and is picked up by a motorist in the Southwest. Schroeder then kills the motorist in cold blood. Now, the FBI has launched a manhunt for Schroeder and puts him on the agency's Ten Most Wanted list. Erskine and Rhodes try to trace Schroeder's bloody trail, which will result in the death a pawn broker.
41	9	"Vendetta"	Paul Wendkos	Franklin Barton	November 20, 1966
Case file #65-40515-S: Otto Mann (Alfred Ryder), a Nazi hunter, wants to help Erskine capture Karl Schindler, former Nazi officer and current Communist spy. However, Erskine wants to capture Schindler alive because of his knowledge of U.S.-based agents, and Mann may want him dead because Otto's wife died in a concentration camp under Schindler.
42	10	"Anatomy of a Prison Break"	Ralph Senensky	Herman Groves & Robert J. Shaw	November 27, 1966
Case file #70-16154-L: A dying inmate in a Colorado federal prison tells the warden that a break-out is going to happen; because the prison houses some of the worst criminals in U.S. custody, the FBI is called into the case. Erskine goes undercover as the new cell mate of Fritz Moline (Joseph Campanella), who's suspected of organizing the escape.
43	11	"The Contaminator"	Paul Wendkos	Daniel B. Ullman	December 4, 1966
Case file #65-57884-U: Communist spy Lawrence Underwood (Linden Chiles) has stolen secrets from an atomic laboratory in Idaho; in the course of the theft, he caused an accident involving atomic materials and is now contaminated with radiation. Erkine is on his trail, unaware of his condition.
44	12	"The Camel's Nose"	Joseph Sargent	Mark Rodgers & Gerald Sanford	December 11, 1966
Case file #164-429-C: A company aircraft of Colton Industries, a Detroit-based defense contractor, explodes in mid-air, killing one of the partners of the company; he was headed to Washington because he was going to blow the whistle about defective aircraft components that Colton Industries was shipping to Vietnam. As Erkine and Rhodes investigate, Assistant Director Arthur Ward takes an interest in the case because he's a friend of Elyse Colton (Diane Baker), the wife of the surviving partner.
45	13	"List for a Firing Squad"	Jesse Hibbs	Mark Rodgers	December 18, 1966
Case file #65-64887-N: Istvan Sladek, an agent for a Communist Eastern European nation who is operating in the U.S., has obtained a coded list of opposition leaders in his country. But in getting the list, he fatally shot the editor of a newspaper for Slavic Americans. Erkine and Rhodes lead the FBI's hunt for Sladek. At the same time, Sladek knows agents of his country will liquidate him the moment he gives up the list. Complicating all of this is the fact Sladek, during the preceding six months, fell in love with a woman (Suzanne Pleshette) who immigrated from his country.
46	14	"The Death Wind"	Ralph Senensky	Robert Leslie Bellem & Mark Rodgers	December 25, 1966
Case file #45-9844-J: Jennerson (Ralph Bellamy), the captain of a freight ship, loses his vessel when it hits what appears to be an old mine. The event is viewed as a tragic accident, which cost the life of one of Jennerson's crew. However, the FBI, led by Erskine and Rhodes, is following up indications the incident was deliberately staged.
47	15	"The Raid"	Ralph Senensky	Mark Rodgers	January 1, 1967
Case file #91-64888-M: A phone call from a mortally wounded ex-convict puts the FBI on the trail of The Iceman, a killer who's part of a gang of bank robbers.
48	16	"Passage Into Fear"	Christian Nyby	Andy Lewis	January 8, 1967
Case file #69-43767-C: Hanna Crandall, a witness in a trial against an intelligence operative of a Communist nation, panics and flees to Quebec, unaware that assassins are on the train with her. Erskine and Rhodes manage to get aboard and try protect her.
49	17	"The Courier"	Ralph Senensky	Robert C. Dennis & Charles Larson	January 15, 1967
Case file #65-43374-S: The agents look for proof that humanitarian Juliet Sinclair (Ruth Roman), recently arrived from her orphanage in Asia, is a Communist courier.
50	18	"A Question of Guilt"	Ralph Senensky	Mark Weingart	January 22, 1967
Case file #44-3928-S: Erskine investigates the murder of a drug addict allegedly beaten to death by veteran police detective Frank Harris (Andrew Duggan). Complicating the case is a newsman's inflammatory charges of police brutality.
51	19	"The Gray Passenger"	Christian Nyby	Jerrold L. Ludwig	January 29, 1967
Case file #45-82133-A: Investigating a shipboard murder, the agents undercover a plot to aid guerrillas in a strife-torn Latin-American republic.
52	20	"The Conspirators"	Christian Nyby	Norman Jolley, Edward V. Monaghan & Robert J. Shaw	February 5, 1967
Case file #100-98451-L: While investigating a Communist-inspired murder, Erskine uncovers a plot to blow up a military supply ship bound for the Orient.
53	21	"Rope of Gold"	Jesse Hibbs	Norman Borisoff & Mark Rodgers	February 12, 1967
Case file #15-50426-K: Erskine becomes involved in international intrigue when he learns that stolen truck cargoes have surfaced behind the Iron Curtain.
54	22	"Hostage"	Christian Nyby	Robert Leslie Bellem & Mark Rodgers	February 19, 1967
Case file #65-54538-S: Enemy agents kidnap an esteemed European statesman (Paul Lukas) in a plot to exchange him for a captured Communist spy.
55	23	"Sky on Fire"	Jesse Hibbs	Don Brinkley & Charles Larson	February 26, 1967
Case file #52-36652-B: After George Bellamy (Bradford Dillman) accidentally kills a man (Charles Grodin), he desperately starts a fire, which he knows will set off a broader blaze, to cover up the crime.
56	24	"Flight Plan"	William Hale	Francis M. Cockrell	March 5, 1967
Case file #87-24533-D: The FBI searches for an art thief (J.D. Cannon) trying to kill the one person who can identify him: a woman (Antoinette Bower) who wrecked his intricate escape plan.
57	25	"The Executioners: Part 1"	Don Medford	Norman Jolley	March 12, 1967
Double dealing within the sprawling crime syndicate known as La Cosa Nostra causes a major war for control.
58	26	"The Executioners: Part 2"	Don Medford	Norman Jolley	March 19, 1967
A Cosa Nostra czar (Walter Pidgeon) plots the death of a possible witness (Telly Savalas) against the crime syndicate.
59	27	"The Satellite"	Jesse Hibbs	David W. Rintels	April 2, 1967
Case file #7-8625-H: The agents probe a kidnapping with a cruel twist: the victim's parents are also being plagued by an extortionist.
60	28	"Force of Nature"	Jesse Hibbs	Mark Rodgers	April 9, 1967
Case file #7-67052-B: The agents race a killer and a hurricane to an abandoned house, where the criminal's terrified wife has fled from her ex-husband (James Franciscus).
61	29	"The Extortionist"	Gene Nelson	Norman Jolley & Mann Rubin	April 16, 1967
Case file #9-3275-C: A bigot (Wayne Rogers) is trying to extort money from a Mexican-American rancher.

=== Season 3 (1967–68) ===
No. overall	No. in season	Title	Directed by	Written by	Original release date
62	1	"The Gold Card"	Don Medford	Mark Rodgers	September 17, 1967
Erskine joins a syndicate poker game that may cost him his life: All the players have been marked for death.
63	2	"Counter-Stroke"	William Hale	Gerald Sanford	September 24, 1967
"The Alexander Tapes": Operating undercover, Erskine poses as a Red courier to reach the top Communist (Kevin McCarthy) in the U.S. Nearing his quarry, the G-man finds himself trapped in a bloody Moscow-Peking power play.
64	3	"Blood Verdict"	Gene Nelson	John Furia	October 8, 1967
The F.B.I. moves to thwart jury tampering by the father (R. G. Armstrong) of a man on trial for murder when a juror dies under mysterious circumstances and the wife (Pilar Seurat) of another juror is threatened.
65	4	"Traitor"	Robert Douglas	John W. Bloch	October 15, 1967
Erskine uncovers a plot to steal top secret missile data that involves two estranged brothers (Andrew Duggan) and (Richard Anderson) and the woman (Phyllis Thaxter) they both ended up marrying.
66	5	"By Force and Violence: Part 1"	Don Medford	E. Arthur Kean	October 22, 1967
Erskine connects the kidnapping of a teenage boy to a heist planned by the boy's long-lost father (Arthur Hill), a criminal who's being forced by his son's kidnappers.
67	6	"By Force and Violence: Part 2"	Don Medford	E. Arthur Kean	October 29, 1967
Trailing the kidnappers, Erskine uncovers plans for a three-million-dollar robbery by the boy's father.
68	7	"A Sleeper Wakes"	Robert Douglas	William Bruckner	November 5, 1967
The murder of a civil servant brings the FBI into an espionage case involving a Communist news service in Mexico City.
69	8	"Overload"	Jesse Hibbs	Robert I. Holt	November 12, 1967
The FBI searches for an ex-convict (Scott Marlowe) bent on murdering the girl (Diana Hyland) whose testimony sent him to prison.
70	9	"Line of Fire"	Jesse Hibbs	Mark Rodgers	November 26, 1967
The F.B.I. tracks one of the 10 most-wanted criminals (Henry Silva). Trapped in the manhunt: a nurse (Lynda Day George) held hostage by the wounded fugitive.
71	10	"Blueprint for Betrayal"	William Hale	Sam Ross	December 3, 1967
A murder investigation implicates a Communist embassy, leading Erskine to suspect that a spy ring is operating in Washington.
72	11	"False Witness"	Jesse Hibbs	E. Arthur Kean	December 10, 1967
As Erskine tries to clear Lynn Hallet (Carol Lynley) of bank robbery, her boyfriend (Pete Duel) plans a theft in which she will play a pivotal role.
73	12	"The Legend of John Rim"	Alvin Ganzer	Andy Lewis	December 31, 1967
In a Gulf Coast city, Erskine runs up against a stone wall of prejudice in his pursuit of murderer John Rim (Tom Skerritt). A local hero, Rim enjoys the sanctuary afforded by an impenetrable swamp and townsfolk who refuse to co-operate with the FBI.
74	13	"The Dynasty"	Robert Douglas	Charles Larson & David H. Vowell	January 7, 1968
A millionaire (Russell Johnson) refuses to pay the ransom to kidnappers (Edward Asner and Martin Sheen) for his brother, forcing the F.B.I. to move fast in order to save the victim's life.
75	14	"The Daughter"	Robert Day	Paul Schneider	January 14, 1968
A long-lost daughter (Julie Sommars) helps the F.B.I. unmask a Communist spy (Michael Rennie) who has taken the identity of a dead American.
76	15	"Act of Violence"	Gene Nelson	Mark Rodgers & Richard Sale	January 21, 1968
Two murders, ten years and 3,000 miles apart, put Erskine and Colby on the trail of Cosa Nostra boss John Duquesne (Burt Reynolds).
77	16	"Crisis Ground"	Robert Douglas	Robert Soderberg	January 28, 1968
An unsolved homicide ignites a town's hatred for a nearby job training camp into a riot.
78	17	"Ring of Steel"	Jesse Hibbs	Robert I. Holt	February 4, 1968
The unexplained death of a race car driver places Erskine on the trail of a stolen car ring.
79	18	"The Homecoming"	Jesse Hibbs	Mel Goldberg	February 11, 1968
John Streyer (Richard Kiley), a scientist who'd defected to East Germany 15 years earlier after participating in an espionage ring, has decided to return to the U.S. Two representatives of a nation "unfriendly to the United States" attempt to detain Streyer at JFK International Airport, but he gets away. Assistant Director Arthur Ward, already in New York on FBI business, works in the field with Erskine and Colby on the case.
80	19	"The Phone Call"	George McCowan	David W. Rintels & Gerald Sanford	February 18, 1968
An Army sergeant, who had just returned from service in Vietnam, found his wife had died under mysterious circumstances the night before his return.
81	20	"Region of Peril"	Jesse Hibbs	Robert Soderberg	February 25, 1968
Erskine sends a secret radio message to a woman (Anne Baxter) who was kidnapped during a house robbery to aid her rescue.
82	21	"Southwind"	George McCowan	Albert Aley & Andy Lewis	March 3, 1968
The F.B.I. and a mob hitman both try to catch up with a bank embezzler (Bradford Dillman) who has fled to the Caribbean.
83	22	"The Messenger"	Lewis Allen	Jack Hawn	March 17, 1968
During the holdup of a Wall Street brokerage firm, a guard is killed and a messenger (Robert Walker Jr.) with a briefcase is taken hostage; the messenger's life was spared only because he was recognized by one of the robbers as the nephew of a Cosa Nostra crime boss.
84	23	"The Ninth Man"	Jesse Hibbs	Mark Rodgers	March 24, 1968
The F.B.I. hunts down a $2,000,000 treasure and the armored car robbers who buried their ill-gotten loot.
85	24	"The Mechanized Accomplice"	Lewis Allen	Norman Jolley & Paul Schneider	March 31, 1968
Erskine races a time bomb for the life of a kidnapped youth.
86	25	"The Predators"	Jesse Hibbs	Mark Rodgers	April 7, 1968
A vessel has been revamped by the Cosa Nostra into being a cruise ship, with illegal gambling. But the mob is after bigger game: a promising politician is being set up to be blackmailed, so the mob can gain control of a state. Erskine goes undercover as a passenger on the cruise ship. But a member of Cosa Nostra's high commission is also aboard... and he can recognize Erskine.
87	26	"The Tunnel"	Jesse Hibbs	Mark Rodgers	April 21, 1968
The F.B.I. goes after bank robbers who use a tunnel to penetrate the vault.
88	27	"The Mercenary"	William Hale	E. Arthur Kean & Palmer Thompson	April 28, 1968
Erskine uncovers a Communist spy whose pretty wife is the lure in a plot to acquire top secret information via blackmail.

=== Season 4 (1968–69) ===
No. overall	No. in season	Title	Directed by	Written by	Original release date
89	1	"Wind It Up and It Betrays You"	William Hale	Harold Jack Bloom, Charles Larson & Mark Rodgers	September 22, 1968
A dead man's hearing aid containing microfilm has the FBI uncovering an espionage ring.
90	2	"Out of Control"	Don Medford	E. Arthur Kean	September 29, 1968
Erskine, Colby, and Assistant Director Ward track down an oil field killer.
91	3	"The Quarry"	Robert Day	Robert I. Holt	October 6, 1968
Erskine must prevent the murder of syndicate errand boy Mike Riley (Dean Stockwell), who is needed by the FBI to net a bigger fish.
92	4	"The Runaways"	Robert Day	Arthur Heinemann	October 13, 1968
A killer (J.D. Cannon) picks for his robbery victims a happy family of four living on a farm.
93	5	"Death of a Fixer"	William Hale	Robert Heverly	October 20, 1968
Erskine poses as a vacationer to nab a syndicate captain (Joseph Campanella) at a resort.
94	6	"The Enemies"	Don Medford	Peter Allan Fields	November 3, 1968
The FBI follows a trail of blood in the hunt for a deadly Communist spy (Jeffrey Hunter) who's out to steal a top secret rocket fuel.
95	7	"The Nightmare"	Jesse Hibbs	Penrod Smith	November 10, 1968
Erskine hunts down a bank embezzler (William Windom), and also tries to protect him from criminals helping in his escape.
96	8	"Breakthrough"	Robert Day	Frank Crow & Jim Byrnes	November 17, 1968
Erskine gambles that Vincent Gray (Mark Richman), a marked man in the syndicate, will turn stool pigeon in exchange for FBI protection.
97	9	"The Harvest"	William Hale	Mark Rodgers	November 24, 1968
A holdup man's (Burt Brinckerhoff) love for a woman (Diane Baker) forces him into a shootout with a crew of FBI agents.
98	10	"The Intermediary"	Don Medford	John D.F. Black	December 1, 1968
Erskine is the go-between for a jeweler (Maurice Evans) seeking the return of stolen diamonds.
99	11	"The Butcher"	Jesse Hibbs	Barry Oringer	December 8, 1968
Erskine hunts down a wartime SS colonel (Charles Korvin) who is still promoting Nazi ideals.
100	12	"The Flaw"	Robert Douglas	Paul Schneider	December 15, 1968
Erskine snares a spy ring and in turn is trapped by them in a deserted mountain cabin.
101	13	"The Hero"	Gunnar Hellström	John W. Bloch & Charles Larson	December 22, 1968
A con man (Chad Everett) wears a US Air Force uniform to entice women to marry him. He then murders or otherwise cheats them.
102	14	"The Widow"	Don Medford	Mark Rodgers	December 29, 1968
Erskine traps a go-go dancer (Lynda Day George) who conspires to marry military service men and collects their insurance money when her boyfriend (Glenn Corbett) murders them.
103	15	"Eye of the Storm"	Jesse Hibbs	Don Brinkley	January 5, 1969
Erskine and Colby search for a kidnapped African-American baby who is hiding in a plague-infested ghetto.
104	16	"The Fraud"	Robert Day	Michael Fisher	January 12, 1969
Erskine fights the Mafia's entry into selling fake masterpiece paintings.
105	17	"A Life in the Balance"	Robert Douglas	Arthur Heinemann	January 19, 1969
Blood at the sight of a kidnapping drives Erskine to act immediately without waiting for the ransom payment from the kidnappers (James Caan and Murray Hamilton).
106	18	"Caesar's Wife"	Robert Day	Warren Duff	January 26, 1969
Erskine trails a Parisian (Claudine Longet) suspected of using her charms to extract state secrets from a widowed diplomat (Michael Rennie), which raises the suspicions of his son (Harrison Ford).
107	19	"The Patriot"	Robert Day	Mark Rodgers	February 2, 1969
As a syndicate kidnapper (James Callahan) dogs his trail, a publisher (Gilbert Roland) declines FBI protection unaware that his best friend is working with the mob.
108	20	"The Maze"	Robert Day	Charles Larson	February 9, 1969
In San Diego, a fugitive (Steve Ihnat) dodges G-men and syndicate executioners to avenge the narcotics-induced death of a friend's (Simon Oakland) daughter.
109	21	"The Attorney"	Robert Douglas	Robert Heverly	February 16, 1969
The FBI spent five years trying to bring a hood (Linden Chiles) to trial, only to be confronted with a plot to kill the man's defense attorney (Arthur Hill) that's masterminded by a man (Tim O'Connor) who is embittered toward the attorney for declining to defend his condemned son who was later executed.
110	22	"The Catalyst"	Jesse Hibbs	Gerald Sanford	February 23, 1969
A hijacked airliner crash lands on its forced flight to Latin American, involving Erskine in a drama of survival with a lady defector (Pilar Seurat). He's escorting her to a congressional hearing in Washington; the hijacker (Alejandro Rey) is a Communist ordered to stop her.
111	23	"Conspiracy of Silence"	Jesse Hibbs	Mark Weingart	March 2, 1969
The FBI searches for three missing murder witnesses (James Daly, Gene Tierney and Kent Smith) who are unaware that they're marked for execution by the syndicate.
112	24	"The Young Warriors"	Robert Douglas	Albert Aley	March 9, 1969
Murder on an Indian reservation sparks an FBI probe that could ignite an explosion between young braves and encroaching miners.
113	25	"The Cober List"	Jesse Hibbs	John D.F. Black	March 23, 1969
A syndicate family is rocked by an internal struggle, providing a crack in mob security that could lead the FBI to a chain of numbers racketeers.
114	26	"Moment of Truth"	Robert Day	Don Brinkley	March 30, 1969
A banker (Richard Carlson) runs a loan-sharking ring from his bank, specializing in ripping off ex-servicemen who have been rejected for a normal loan at his bank. The crime that garners the attention of the FBI is the murder of a serviceman on a government reservation who could not pay the outrageous interest on a "loan."

=== Season 5 (1969–70) ===
No. overall	No. in season	Title	Directed by	Written by	Original release date
115	1	"Target of Interest"	William Hale	Warren Duff	September 14, 1969
Erskine poses as a lovelorn diplomat to provide fresh bait for an extortion ring suspected of having blackmailed a diplomat to suicide.
116	2	"Nightmare Road"	Harvey Hart	Mark Rodgers	September 21, 1969
Erskine spearheads a manhunt for a fugitive (Robert Duvall) who gunned down an FBI agent. Caught up in the hunt are an engaged couple with criminal records who were frightened into helping the gunman escape to Mexico.
117	3	"The Swindler"	William Hale	Andy Lewis	September 28, 1969
The FBI picks up the trail of a bank cashier's murderer. A man of rare ingenuity and charm, the killer has already begun to involve a lady banker (Vera Miles) in an extraordinary embezzlement scheme.
118	4	"Boomerang"	Gene Nelson	Robert Heverly	October 5, 1969
Terry Shelton (Jeff Bridges) fakes his own kidnapping in an attempt to extort money from his hated father (Carl Betz). The plot boomerangs into a knotty case for the FBI when an accomplice makes the abduction real and the elder Shelton insists on handling the ransom drop his own way.
119	5	"Silent Partner"	William Hale	Jack Turley	October 12, 1969
A juror who took a Mafia bribe repents too late. With the FBI probing his sudden affluence, Steve Harber (Robert Hooks) falls prey to a blackmailer who saw him take the bribe. Meanwhile, the Mafia begins its deadly work to avoid prosecution.
120	6	"Gamble with Death"	William Hale	Don Brinkley	October 19, 1969
An honest man takes a dangerous gamble to clear his imprisoned brother of murder.
121	7	"Flight"	Gene Nelson	John D.F. Black & Robert Heverly	October 26, 1969
Erskine urges the hijacker (Tim O'Connor) of a Cuban-bound plane to land immediately to save the life of a wounded passenger (Larry Linville).
122	8	"The Challenge"	Jesse Hibbs	Donald S. Sanford & Mark Weingart	November 2, 1969
The unhappy wife (Joanne Linville) of a top-security engineer (Richard Anderson) becomes a dupe in an amorous master spy's (Fritz Weaver) efforts to sabotage a sensitive American industry.
123	9	"Blood Tie"	Virgil W. Vogel	Robert Heverly	November 9, 1969
On the run from the FBI, Ricky Kriton (Scott Marlowe) takes shelter with his brother, a staid businessman ignorant of Ricky's criminal past.
124	10	"The Sanctuary"	Jesse Hibbs	Anthony Spinner	November 16, 1969
FBI agent Harry Dane (Booker Bradshaw) leads a treacherous ghetto search for an ex-football star (Billy Dee Williams) wanted for robbery and murder.
125	11	"Scapegoat"	Don Medford	Robert Heverly & Edward J. Lakso	November 23, 1969
A young woman is killed on U.S. government property. The M.O. is identical to an earlier crime — except a man (Harrison Ford) was arrested and convicted of that crime. Erskine and Colby investigate whether the wrong man was convicted in the earlier death.
126	12	"The Inside Man"	Gene Nelson	Norman Hudis & Mark Weingart	November 30, 1969
Erskine and Colby uncover the "inside man" (Lloyd Bochner) in a series of jewelry heists from New York City's diamond district.
127	13	"The Prey"	Jesse Hibbs	Don Brinkley	December 7, 1969
One of the FBI's most wanted men (Steve Ihnat) uses a beautiful nurse (Joanna Moore) as his accomplice in a cruel con game aimed at the elderly and infirm. She draws a bead on her patients' assets — then he strikes.
128	14	"Journey Into Night"	Virgil W. Vogel	Robert Heverly	December 14, 1969
Escaped federal prisoner David Starret (John Vernon) kidnaps his own son from the son's foster parents in Albany and takes him to Texas.
129	15	"The Doll Courier"	Herschel Daugherty	Gerald Sanford	December 21, 1969
The FBI goes after Communist agents who use the head of a porcelain doll to transport top secret microfilm.
130	16	"Tug-of-War"	Don Medford	Anthony Spinner & Mark Weingart	December 28, 1969
The murder of a stockbroker unearths a new syndicate enterprise: using certificates, extorted from stockbrokers, as collateral for large bank loans.
131	17	"Fatal Impostor"	Jesse Hibbs	Anthony Spinner	January 4, 1970
A tense chase begins when widow Anne Williams (Mary Fickett) and her son (David Cassidy) are taken hostage by a fugitive.
132	18	"Conspiracy of Corruption"	Don Medford	Mark Rodgers	January 11, 1970
A sheriff (James Olson) is Erskine's chief suspect in a shooting linked to the illegal transportation of foreign laborers.
133	19	"The Diamond Millstone"	Robert Douglas	Robert Heverly	January 18, 1970
Big-time fences and gem cutters are put under surveillance after the theft of a 33-carat diamond. The well-laid plan goes haywire at a crucial rendezvous: the fence is captured, but the thief (Jack Klugman) and the gem get away.
134	20	"Deadly Reunion"	Jesse Hibbs	Warren Duff	January 25, 1970
Matt Bernhardt is a member of a spy ring under investigation, and when he is apprehended his nephew is wounded. Erskine goes undercover as the nephew and his investigation leads him to West Berlin and a plot to get the ringleader's wife out of East Berlin.
135	21	"Pressure Point"	Don Medford	Peter Allan Fields & Robert Heverly	February 1, 1970
An up-and-coming gambling operator (Fred Beir) works himself into a dangerous bind between his syndicate protectors and the FBI.
136	22	"Summer Terror"	Michael O'Herlihy	Gerald Sanford & Mark Weingart	February 8, 1970
With the FBI far behind, a kidnap victim has only one hope: one of the abductors (Mark Jenkins) is growing fond of her.
137	23	"Return to Power"	Don Medford	Mark Rodgers	February 15, 1970
Erskine capitalizes on a blood feud between half-brothers (Christopher George and Mark Richman) to lead him to secret Mafia financial records.
138	24	"The Dealer"	Jesse Hibbs	Don Brinkley & Robert Heverly	February 22, 1970
Erskine goes undercover driving big rigs to obtain evidence against an interstate hijacking ring. Colby also goes undercover as a shipping clerk; he is injured in the line of duty when an ex-con reveals that Colby was not a convict.
139	25	"Deadfall"	Don Medford	Robert Heverly	March 1, 1970
False leads hamper the FBI's search for Mary Cochella (Zohra Lampert), the kidnapped wife of a sports-arena cashier.
140	26	"The Quest"	Philip Abbott	Mark Weingart	March 8, 1970
Walker Carr (Earl Holliman), who allegedly murdered his wife, escapes from a hospital for the criminally insane, convinced that she's alive. Carr has no memory of the crime, a body was never found, and even Erskine doubts Carr's guilt as the manhunt quickens.

=== Season 6 (1970–71) ===
No. overall	No. in season	Title	Directed by	Written by	Original release date
141	1	"The Condemned"	Virgil W. Vogel	Robert Heverly	September 20, 1970
Erskine and Colby pursue two Philadelphia bank robbers (Martin Sheen and Tim McIntyre) across the country.
142	2	"The Traitor"	William Hale	Gerald Sanford	September 27, 1970
After a portion of a top-secret formula is found concealed on the body of a technical publication editor for a major research firm who died in an elevator accident, Erskine searches for evidence of espionage and discovers an employee (Bradford Dillman) has accepted money from a traitor (Wayne Rogers)
143	3	"Escape to Terror"	William Hale	Don Brinkley	October 4, 1970
A fugitive (James Olson) who jumps bail after being indicted for fraud, but the plan goes wrong when his pregnant wife runs into trouble and the Mafia wants his cousin's husband (Harry Guardino) to kill him.
144	4	"The Architect"	Virgil W. Vogel	Story by : Jonathan Box; Teleplay by : Robert Heverly	October 11, 1970
Three prisoners (Monte Markham, Billy Dee Williams and Dabbs Greer) escape the bus en route to the prison, with the trio plotting to rob a Miami bank that could kill innocent people.
145	5	"The Savage Wilderness"	Virgil W. Vogel	Robert Malcolm Young	October 18, 1970
A teenage girl (Darleen Carr) is kidnapped and taken by a mentally disturbed man (Don Stroud) into the California National Forest Preserve.
146	6	"Time Bomb"	Virgil W. Vogel	Robert Malcolm Young	October 25, 1970
The plan of young revolutionaries to set off a bomb in a crowded courthouse results in a frantic search by the FBI.
147	7	"The Innocents"	Gene Nelson	Pat Riddle	November 1, 1970
A seven-year-old boy is kidnapped and held for ransom by an emotionally unstable woman (Lois Nettleton) and her alcoholic husband (Larry Blyden).
148	8	"The Deadly Pact"	Virgil W. Vogel	Robert Heverly	November 8, 1970
Loan sharks that are backed by a Mafia figure (Robert Loggia) are out to take over companies in an African-American section of Los Angeles.
149	9	"The Impersonator"	William Hale	Don Brinkley	November 22, 1970
A suave ex-convict (Stuart Whitman) who preys on wealthy, lonely women has proposed marriage to a young widow (Mariette Hartley) while he's the target of an FBI manhunt.
150	10	"Antennae of Death"	Virgil W. Vogel	Robert Heverly	November 29, 1970
A major crime syndicate is under investigation for moving large shipments of heroin across the United States border, but a rogue operator (William Shatner) with his own drug problem hijacks a payment.
151	11	"The Target"	William Hale	Gerald Sanford	December 6, 1970
A foreign agent (Eric Braeden) enters the United States to abduct the daughter of a top Communist minister who has defected to Western Europe.
152	12	"The Witness"	William Hale	Mark Rodgers	December 13, 1970
The spoiled son (Don Grady) of a wealthy businessman (Murray Hamilton) is being used by a crime syndicate after he inadvertently causes severe injuries to a soldier.
153	13	"Incident in the Desert"	Bernard McEveety	Mark Weingart	December 20, 1970
A gang of jewel thieves heads to a New Mexico hideout after robbing a wealthy Texan and his guests during a party.
154	14	"The Inheritors"	Jesse Hibbs	Alvin Sapinsley	December 27, 1970
An embezzler (Ray Danton) and his beautiful accomplice (Suzanne Pleshette) head to California wine country in order to fleece an aging millionaire wine grower (Gene Raymond), with the wine grower's son (Larry Linville) suspicious of the woman's relationship with his father.
155	15	"The Unknown Victim"	William Hale	Mark Weingart	January 3, 1971
Kidnappers abduct a girl that they mistakenly believe is a wealthy heiress.
156	16	"The Stalking Horse"	Nicholas Webster	Jack Turley	January 10, 1971
An executive (Steve Forrest) of a major research group that's working on top-secret government projects becomes involved with an espionage ring.
157	17	"Center of Peril"	Carl Barth	Robert Malcolm Young	January 17, 1971
Erskine poses as an art expert to penetrate a gang of thieves (Vic Morrow, Gary Collins, Susan Howard) that are attempting to sell a million-dollar painting back to the museum from where it was stolen.
158	18	"The Eye of the Needle"	Virgil W. Vogel	Robert Heverly	January 24, 1971
The abduction of a surgeon (Richard Kiley) by extortionists leads to a search through Washington's Cascade Mountains.
159	19	"The Fatal Connection"	Nicholas Webster	Ed Waters	January 31, 1971
The FBI seeks to discover the identity of a crime lord (Dana Elcar) who ordered the murder of a crusading newspaper columnist (Andrew Duggan).
160	20	"The Replacement"	Philip Abbott	Gerald Sanford	February 7, 1971
Erskine goes undercover to pose as a Communist agent who's entered the country to replace an important American-based spy (Phyllis Thaxter).
161	21	"Death Watch"	Robert Douglas	Robert Heverly	February 14, 1971
A gang that's selling stolen military weapons to extremist groups is the focus of an intense FBI investigation, with the leader of the gang (Glenn Corbett) forced to deal with his girlfriend (Diane Keaton), who's against his motives.
162	22	"Downfall"	Virgil W. Vogel	Story by : Shirl Hendryx; Teleplay by : Robert Heverly & Shirl Hendryx	February 21, 1971
A former college athlete (Michael Burns) uses daredevil tactics to steal gems for a crooked jeweler (Carl Betz), while also secretly dating the jeweler's daughter (Anne Archer).
163	23	"The Hitchhiker"	Virgil W. Vogel	Mark Rodgers	February 28, 1971
An AWOL Army private (Michael Douglas) uses a pair of hippies (Donna Mills and Richard Kelton) as decoys after robbing a bank.
164	24	"Turnabout"	Robert Douglas	Don Brinkley	March 7, 1971
The only survivor of a half-million dollar robbery (Warren Oates) that was engineered by a crime syndicate is the focus of an FBI manhunt.
165	25	"The Natural"	Vigil W. Vogel	Story by : Norman Jolley; Teleplay by : Ed Waters	March 14, 1971
The bribery of college basketball players by a New York crime syndicate is investigated.
166	26	"Three-Way Split"	Philip Abbott	Gerald Sanford	March 21, 1971
The FBI attempts to find three criminals (Peter Haskell, Albert Salmi and Richard O'Brien) who went their separate ways after splitting nearly $1 million from a Denver bank robbery.

=== Season 7 (1971–72) ===
No. overall	No. in season	Title	Directed by	Written by	Original release date
167	1	"Death on Sunday"	Virgil W. Vogel	Mark Weingart	September 12, 1971
A professional football player (Frank Converse) who's being victimized by extortionists (Andrew Prine and Solomon Sturges) seeks the help of the FBI.
168	2	"Recurring Nightmare"	Virgil W. Vogel	Robert Lewin	September 19, 1971
The abduction of an 18-year-old girl (Belinda Montgomery) leads to the discovery that she had been with her father 10 years before when he was killed after hiding $400,000 from a payroll robbery. The abductors turn out to be her father's partner in the crime (Ralph Meeker) and the partner's cellmate (Tim McIntire).
169	3	"The Last Job"	Virgil W. Vogel	Robert Heverly	September 26, 1971
A prison escapee is intent on planning a military payroll robbery.
170	4	"The Deadly Gift"	Philip Abbott	Ben Masselink	October 3, 1971
A con artist (Fritz Weaver), in concert with a scheming assistant (Joan Van Ark) attempts to bilk $100,000 out of a widow (Dana Wynter) who convinces her that her missing son is still alive.
171	5	"Dynasty of Hate"	Virgil W. Vogel	Robert Heverly	October 10, 1971
A wealthy rancher's son (Earl Holliman) hires a hit man (Henry Silva) to kill his younger brother in order to have the family inheritance all to himself, but the hired killer instead decides to hold the younger son for ransom.
172	6	"The Mastermind: Part 1"	Virgil W. Vogel	Robert Heverly	October 17, 1971
A traveling salesman (Bradford Dillman) masterminds the robbery of $1.8 million from an amusement park by four men disguised as entertainers, but then doublecrosses his cronies (Steve Ihnat, Scott Marlowe and Clu Gulager) by fleeing with the money.
173	7	"The Mastermind: Part 2"	Virgil W. Vogel	Robert Heverly	October 24, 1971
The race to find a thief who cheated members of his gang out of money from a robbery takes place between the disgruntled cronies and the FBI, with the thief having resumed his everyday job.
174	8	"The Watch-Dog"	Allen Reisner	Gerald Sandford	October 31, 1971
Foreign agents make a concerted effort to steal plans to a top-secret project, with one (Stuart Whitman) using a former flame which results in Erskine and the FBI entering the case.
175	9	"The Game of Terror"	Ralph Senensky	Robert Malcolm Young	November 7, 1971
Two prep school students lock a fellow classmate in a deserted mine shaft and demand a ransom for his safe return.
176	10	"End of a Hero"	Ralph Senensky	Ed Waters	November 21, 1971
A former war hero (Ed Nelson) agrees to pilot a getaway helicopter to aid in a robbery gang's quick escape.
177	11	"Superstition Rock"	Seymour Robbie	Mark Rogers	November 28, 1971
The investigation into the attempted murder of an Indian Affairs agent uncovers the fact that the agent was on the verge of discovering the identities of the people (Dana Elcar, Wayne Rogers and Lou Antonio) responsible for a series of mine accidents.
178	12	"The Minerva Tapes"	Michael O'Herlihy	Warren Duff	December 5, 1971
Erskine infiltrates an espionage network and ends up getting caught in the middle of a power struggle.
179	13	"Bitter Harbor"	Virgil W. Vogel	Story by : Ron Bishop; Teleplay by : Robert Heverly & Ron Bishop	December 12, 1971
An attempt by an organized crime leader (Cameron Mitchell) to take over a fisherman's union involves providing money to the union's leader (Joseph Wiseman) and results in the FBI stepping in to put an end to the threat.
180	14	"The Recruiter"	Virgil W. Vogel	Robert C. Dennis	December 19, 1971
A fugitive (Monte Markham) who is already being sought in connection with a bank robbery sets out to plan one more caper before he leaves the country, but decides to try rekindling a relationship with an old flame (Jessica Walter).
181	15	"The Buyer"	Carl Barth	Ed Waters	January 2, 1972
Erskine goes undercover to serve as a representative of a fence (Leon Askin) who is contacted by a gang (Tim O'Connor, David Hedison and Stefanie Powers) that stole $1 million worth of platinum.
182	16	"A Second Life"	Ralph Senensky	Dick Nelson	January 9, 1972
A hired killer (Martin Sheen) is being sought by both the FBI and the organized crime boss (John Sylvester White) that is seeking to murder him for messing up an assignment. However, while hiding out, he finds love with a pregnant, hippie artist (Meg Foster)
183	17	"The Break-Up"	Virgil W. Vogel	Ed Waters	January 16, 1972
A bank robber who's attempting to go straight is prodded by his wife (Donna Mills) to attempt one more big job on their behalf by a fence (Charles Cioffi).
184	18	"Judas Goat"	Virgil W. Vogel	Robert Malcolm Young	January 23, 1972
The purchase of a singer's (John Davidson) contract by an organized crime loan shark (Linden Chiles) draws the attention of Erskine and the FBI.
185	19	"The Hunters"	Virgil W. Vogel	Mark Rodgers	January 30, 1972
A scientist (Richard Kiley) who happens to be carrying vital defense secrets is the subject of a dual manhunt by the FBI and foreign agents.
186	20	"Arrangement with Terror"	Ralph Senensky	Ed Waters	February 6, 1972
The theft of securities from a brokerage office by the wife (Diana Hyland) of a heroin-addicted architect becomes a bigger concern when the involvement of organized crime comes to light.
187	21	"The Set-Up"	Seymour Robbie	Robert Heverly	February 13, 1972
In the midst of a search for the leader of a gang that pulled off a bank robbery, the man plots to rob and kill a wealthy aristocrat (Jessica Tandy).
188	22	"The Test"	Michael O'Herlihy	Mark Weingart	February 20, 1972
A young man (Robert Foxworth) who sets out to pay the ransom for his kidnapped father (Harold Gould) is the subject of surveillance by Erskine.
189	23	"The Corruptor"	Virgil W. Vogel	Robert Heverly	February 27, 1972
A man (Robert Drivas) who is en route to a mysterious destination across the country is on a crime spree along the way.
190	24	"The Deadly Species"	Ralph Senensky	Dick Nelson	March 5, 1972
In order finance an effort to steal away her eight-year-old son (Leif Garrett) from her ex-husband, a woman (Penny Fuller) pulls a string of robberies.
191	25	"Dark Journey"	Philip Abbott	Gerald Sanford	March 12, 1972
A con man (Claude Akins), with the help of his daughter (Lindsay Wagner), impersonates a famous "invisible" tycoon in order to sell stock in a fake company. However, his smooth talk comes back to haunt him when a loan shark (Vic Tayback) forces him to set up the robbery of an illegal casino.
192	26	"Escape to Nowhere"	Virgil W. Vogel	Ed Waters	March 19, 1972
While searching for escaped convict Mike Durgom (John Vernon), who's taken a widow (Diana Muldaur) and her young son (Lee Montgomery) hostage, Erskine discovers that an organized crime boss has put out a contract to have Durgom killed in order to prevent him from giving testimony at a trial.

=== Season 8 (1972–73) ===
No. overall	No. in season	Title	Directed by	Written by	Original release date
193	1	"The Runner"	Lawrence Dobkin	Jack Turley	September 17, 1972
While being pursued by the FBI, an escaped prisoner kidnaps a woman and takes her into the vast Oregon wilderness.
194	2	"The Edge of Desperation"	Arnold Laven	Mark Weingart	September 24, 1972
A businessman masterminds his own kidnapping and uses the ransom money obtained from his father-in-law to flee with his mistress to New York.
195	3	"The Fatal Showdown"	Virgil W. Vogel	Ed Waters	October 1, 1972
The heist of a valuable statue from a Manhattan art auction puts the FBI in pursuit of Ken Meade and his gang.
196	4	"The Franklin Papers"	Virgil W. Vogel	Ben Masselink	October 8, 1972
Con artist Christine Minton and her accomplice attempt to sell an amateur historian some forged documents.
197	5	"The Gopher"	Virgil W. Vogel	Calvin Clements, Jr.	October 15, 1972
To crack a loan shark operation, the FBI sets out to find who stole a key book containing the borrower's names.
198	6	"End of a Nightmare"	Earl Bellamy	Gerald Sanford	October 22, 1972
Escaped prisoner Darryl Ryder seeks to exact revenge on the people that were responsible for the annulment of his marriage.
199	7	"The Engineer"	Philip Abbott	Norman Lessing	October 29, 1972
An unemployed aerospace engineer (Ed Nelson) plots a $3 million robbery.
200	8	"A Game of Chess"	Philip Leacock	Mark Weingart	November 5, 1972
Erskine impersonates a blind foreign scientist in an attempt to recover stolen American plans.
201	9	"The Wizard"	Walter Grauman	Robert W. Lenski	November 12, 1972
A bank employee (Ross Martin) embezzles funds with the idea of using it to fund a much bigger heist of $3 million.
202	10	"The Loner"	Virgil W. Vogel	Mark Rodgers	November 19, 1972
The FBI is pursuing John Morgan, who's pulled off a series of bank holdups by himself. However, along the way, Morgan runs afoul of a small-town racketeer.
203	11	"Canyon of No Return"	Virgil W. Vogel	Robert Heverly	November 26, 1972
Erskine attempts to catch up with a raft containing two holdup men and their hostages. The group is headed down the Rogue River toward a deadly waterfall.
204	12	"Holiday with Terror"	Carl Barth	Robert Malcom Young	December 3, 1972
18-year-old Karen Collins goes away with two new friends on a vacation, unaware that they're demanding a ransom for her safe return.
205	13	"The Jug Marker"	Virgil W. Vogel	Robert Heverly	December 10, 1972
During the investigation of a bank robbery, the FBI is able to get a lead on Elias Devon, a smooth operator who plots crimes.
206	14	"The Outcast"	Virgil W. Vogel	Arthur Dales	December 17, 1972
Paul Prentiss is a hijacker who's plotting one more big job before he leaves the United States for good. In the meantime, he's being pursued by Erskine.
207	15	"Dark Christmas"	Virgil W. Vogel	Robert Heverley	December 24, 1972
A hired killer, Stuart Tilden, takes a family hostage on Christmas Eve as he waits for the return of his intended victim.
208	16	"The Rap Taker"	Virgil W. Vogel	Dick Nelson	January 7, 1973
After a crime boss commits assault, he pays a young man to admit to the offense, which results in the FBI searching for a witness to the crime.
209	17	"A Gathering of Sharks"	Earl Bellamy	Mark Weingart	January 14, 1973
A couple (David Hedison and Jessica Walter) steal a valuable diamond and then try to re-sell it back to the owner. Erskine, going undercover as a golf pro, serves as the go-between in the proposed transaction.
210	18	"The Disinherited"	Virgil W. Vogel	Robert Heverly	January 21, 1973
A young man (Martin Sheen) believes that he should inherit an oil millionaire's wealth and commits extortion and attempted murder in order to try and make it happen.
211	19	"Desperate Journey"	Earl Bellamy	Calvin Clements	January 28, 1973
John Stahl (Vic Morrow) is an escaped prisoner who's being pursued by Erskine through rugged wilderness territory,
212	20	"The Double Play"	Seymour Robbie	Ed Waters	February 4, 1973
Two con men are attempting to fleece a young record industry tycoon, with Erskine and the FBI in hot pursuit of the duo.
213	21	"The Wedding Gift"	Arnold Laven	Dick Nelson	February 11, 1973
A mother (Penny Fuller) with a 12-year-old daughter (Erin Moran) who has been masterminding robberies meets a man (John Ericson) and seeks to give up her past life.
214	22	"The Detonator"	Seymour Robbie	Calvin Clements	February 25, 1973
A prosecutor is marked for death, with Erskine tasked with finding the hit man who seeks to kill him.
215	23	"Sweet Evil"	Philip Leacock	Mark Weingart	March 4, 1973
In the aftermath of a robbery, a pair of thieves (Andrew Prine and Melissa Murphy) go visit the woman's sister, who convinces them to take her along. The younger sister then evolves into a vicious criminal.
216	24	"Memory of a Legend"	Seymour Robbie	Calvin Clements, Jr.	March 11, 1973
A retired safecracker (Pat Hingle) goes to visit his son and ends up getting talked into undertaking one last job.
217	25	"Night of the Long Knives"	Robert Douglas	Robert Heverly	March 25, 1973
Erskine goes undercover as the caterer for the wedding of the daughter of a crime boss after rumors surface that a series of killings within an organized crime family are planned.
218	26	"The Loper Gambit"	Philip Abbott	Robert Malcom Young	April 1, 1973
The son of a wealthy realtor is kidnapped and held in a deserted fort in the Florida Keys by a group led by a demented egomaniac. Soon after, a woman in the group begins to suspect that the leader plans on killing the victim.

=== Season 9 (1973–74) ===
No. overall	No. in season	Title	Directed by	Written by	Original release date
219	1	"The Big Job"	Don Medford	Robert Malcolm Young	September 16, 1973
The FBI enlists the help of a computer to turn up suspects in a precise multi-million dollar robbery of an armored car firm.
220	2	"The Confession"	Don Medford	Jack Turley	September 30, 1973
The manager (Hal Linden) of singing star Darlene Clark (Nancy Wilson) blames her for the death of his son and kidnaps her daughter in retaliation. (Frank Bonner and Tom Selleck also appear in minor roles.)
221	3	"Break-In"	Marc Daniels	Norman Lessing	October 7, 1973
Escaped convict Harlan Slade (Jackie Cooper) is the object of an FBI manhunt, with Erskine receiving a tip that he's planning a bank robbery.
222	4	"The Pay-off"	Virgil W. Vogel	Calvin Clements	October 14, 1973
Frank Rodman (Earl Holliman), who was bribed by organized crime to keep quiet about a shooting, is being sought by both the FBI and the mob. In the latter case, they plan on killing him to ensure his silence.
223	5	"The Exchange"	Marc Daniels	Robert C. Dennis	October 21, 1973
Erskine poses as the head cashier of a race track who's been implicated in a robbery in order to set a trap for the thieves.
224	6	"Tower of Terror"	Don Medford	Jackson Gillis	October 28, 1973
After a man plants a powerful bomb in an office building, Erskine has 31 hours to try and find where he placed it before it detonates.
225	7	"Fatal Reunion"	William Wiard	Mark Rodgers	November 4, 1973
With Erskine in pursuit, a bank robber (Ed Nelson) returns to the hometown where he was a football star and glamour boy and where he rekindles a romance with his high school sweetheart (Susan Oliver).
226	8	"Rules of the Game"	Don Medford	Ed Waters	November 18, 1973
The son of an organized crime leader attempts to kill a federal witness against the father, causing the FBI to conduct a manhunt for him.
227	9	"Fool's Gold"	William Wiard	Robert W. Lenski	November 25, 1973
Nick Parrish (Lou Antonio) steals a valuable religious cross, but then loses possession of it to ex-convict Edward Hudson (Leslie Nielsen).
228	10	"The Killing Truth"	Lawrence Dobkin	Irving Pearlberg	December 9, 1973
Intent on revenge against Judge Nelson Harper (Lloyd Nolan), Joe Holloway fail on his first attempt but plans on trying again.
229	11	"The Bought Jury"	Alexander Singer	Barry Oringer	December 16, 1973
When the trial of organized crime figure Mario Dracas results in a hung jury, Erskine investigates threats that were made against jurors.
230	12	"Ransom"	Earl Bellamy	Ed Waters	December 30, 1973
Erskine suspects that kidnapped college student Tish Lemaire is actually colluding with her captors to get back at her stepmother (Anne Francis)
231	13	"A Piece of the Action"	Don Medford	Ed Waters	January 6, 1974
Organized crime has infiltrated a trucking company, which subsequently leads to a series of hijackings.
232	14	"Selkirk's War"	Walter Grauman	S.S. Schweitzer	January 27, 1974
An embittered ex-Army officer helps two men break out of the stockade in order to help him rob both a bank and an Army payroll convoy.
233	15	"The Betrayal"	William Wiard	S.S. Schweitzer	February 3, 1974
Erskine searches for an escaped prisoner in order to not only save him from revenge-minded organized crime members, but also in an effort to get him to become an informant.
234	16	"The Animal"	Walter Grauman	not shown in credits	February 17, 1974
The FBI searches for Ben Sillman (Gary Lockwood), a deranged enforcer for organized crime, before he's able to use his connections to get safely out of the country.
235	17	"The Two Million Dollar Hit"	Robert Douglas	Calvin Clements, Jr.	February 24, 1974
A plane that's carrying $2 million in travelers' checks is hijacked by a gang.
236	18	"Diamond Run"	Michael Caffey	Arthur Weingarten	March 10, 1974
After Frank Danzer steals a fortune in diamonds, he's pursued by not only Erskine, but Gustave Becker (Eric Braeden), a ruthless mercenary that's employed by the diamond company.
237	19	"Deadly Ambition"	Don Medford	Robert W. Lenski	March 17, 1974
After pulling off an armored car robbery, Ernie Cahn (Harvey Keitel) is the object of pursuit by both the FBI and organized crime. Also guest starred Gerald McRaney.
238	20	"The Lost Man"	William Wiard	Judy Burns	March 24, 1974
An escaped convict, Greg Davidson (Robert Foxworth), abducts his former partner in a blackmail scheme, Mason Hammond (Don Porter).
239	21	"The Vendetta"	Virgil W. Vogel	Richard H. Landau	April 7, 1974
A former crime boss, Rudy Keppler (John Vernon), is lured back from his hideout in Haiti by his former girlfriend (Joan Van Ark), who's helping set up his execution by three of his former lieutenants.
240	22	"Confessions of a Madman"	Philip Abbott	Richard H. Landau	April 14, 1974
Erskine investigates the attempted murder of a college student, with the main suspects being the woman's college professor (Daniel J. Travanti) and an aide to a swimming coach (Robert Pine).
241	23	"Survival"	Seymour Robbie	Irving Pearlberg	April 28, 1974
Trying to get the seriously injured Chris Daniels to a doctor while in the rugged Arizona wilderness, Erskine is forced to contend with an escape-bent prisoner (Jon Cypher) and a mysterious woman (Julie Gregg).
