= Conspiracy (disambiguation) =

A conspiracy is a secret plot by two or more persons to obtain some goal, usually understood with negative connotations.

Conspiracy may also refer to:

== Music ==
- Conspiracy (band), a progressive rock band founded by Billy Sherwood and Chris Squire
- Conspiracy (Junior M.A.F.I.A. album)
- Conspiracy (King Diamond album)
- Conspiracy (Michael Bormann album)
- Conspiracy, an album by The Raven Age
- "Conspiracy", a song by Paramore from All We Know Is Falling

== Film and television ==
=== Film ===
- The Conspiracy (1916 film), a silent film
- Conspiracy (1930 film), a film by Christy Cabanne
- Conspiracy (1939 film), a film by Lew Landers
- Conspiracy (2001 film), a dramatization of the Nazi 1942 Wannsee Conference concerning the "Final Solution"
- Conspiracy (2008 film), an action-drama starring Val Kilmer
- The Conspiracy (2012 film), a Canadian conspiracy thriller by Christopher MacBride

=== Television ===
- "Conspiracy", the third episode of the 1965 Doctor Who serial The Romans
- "Conspiracy" (Star Trek: The Next Generation), an episode (S01 E25; 1988) of Star Trek: The Next Generation
- Conspiracies (TV series), a 2003 series on BBC and TechTV
- Conspiracy?, a 2004 TV series on the History Channel
- "Conspiracy" (Superstore), an episode (S06 E09; 2021) of the television series Superstore
- "Conspiracy" (Star Wars: The Clone Wars)

=== Web ===
- 24: Conspiracy (2005), a spin-off series from the TV series 24, for viewing on mobile phones only
- Conspiracy Series with Shane Dawson (2019), an American documentary web series created by YouTuber Shane Dawson

== Games ==
- Conspiracy (board game)
- Conspiracies (video game)
- KGB (video game) or Conspiracy
- Magic: The Gathering Conspiracy, a 2014 series of the Magic the Gathering collectible card game

== Books and comics ==
- Conspiracies (novel)
- Conspiracy (comics), a team of super powered beings in the Marvel Comics universe
- Conspiracy, a 1998 fantasy novel by J. Robert King, set in the Forgotten Realms
- Conspiracy, a 1980 book by Anthony Summers

== Other uses ==
- Criminal conspiracy, a criminal offense
- Conspiracy (demogroup)
- Conspiracy '87, the 45th World Science Fiction Convention, held in Brighton, England, in 1987
- Conspiracy Entertainment, a video game publisher
- Conspiracy, the collective noun for a group of ravens
- Diachronic conspiracy, a group of unrelated sound changes which, in combination, create a result not expected by any singular sound change

== See also ==
- Conspiracy theory (disambiguation)
- Conspirator (disambiguation)
- Cowspiracy
