= Admission (film) =

- Theatrical release poster
- Directed by: Paul Weitz
- Written by: Karen Croner
- Based on: Admission by Jean Hanff Korelitz
- Produced by: Paul Weitz; Kerry Kohansky-Roberts; Andrew Miano
- Starring: Tina Fey; Paul Rudd; Michael Sheen; Wallace Shawn; Lily Tomlin
- Cinematography: Declan Quinn
- Edited by: Joan Sobel
- Music by: Stephen Trask
- Production company: Depth of Field
- Distributed by: Focus Features
- Release date: March 22, 2013
- Running time: 108 minutes
- Country: United States
- Language: English
- Budget: $13 million
- Box office: $18.6 million

Admission is a 2013 American romantic comedy-drama film directed by Paul Weitz and starring Tina Fey and Paul Rudd. The film was released by Focus Features in the United States and Canada on March 22, 2013. It is an adaptation of Jean Hanff Korelitz's 2009 novel of the same name.

== Plot ==
Straight-laced Princeton University Admissions Officer Portia Nathan has vast experience in the coaching, consoling, and criticism involved in Princeton's admission process.

Portia is caught off guard while making a recruiting visit to the Quest School, an alternative high school overseen by her former college classmate, John Pressman. The free-wheeling John teaches while raising Nelson, his adopted pre-teen son. After exposing Portia to outspoken Quest students' impressions of college, he takes her to meet the rather unconventional Jeremiah, a child prodigy.

Back on campus, Portia's longtime boyfriend Mark breaks up with her after impregnating a "Virginia Woolf scholar" named Helen. After an awkward romantic attraction to Pressman, she arranges for Jeremiah to visit Princeton, where she and a colleague, Corinne, are rivals to succeed the soon-to-retire Dean of Admissions.

Portia long ago had a secret pregnancy, putting the baby up for adoption, and is shown a birth certificate by Pressman proving that Jeremiah is hers. Although he is brilliant, Jeremiah's inferior transcript results in his being deemed unfit to attend Princeton. In an act that greatly endangers her position, Portia sneaks into the office at night and changes Jeremiah's rejection to an offer for admission, knowing that – if caught – the Dean of Admissions cannot rescind Jeremiah's already submitted acceptance without creating a scandal. When her actions are exposed, the Dean demands her resignation.

Portia confesses to Jeremiah that she is his biological mother, but he proves that she is incorrect; his photocopied birth certificate has a faded imperceptible digit changing his hour of birth, and he has already located his actual biological mother. Portia appears at the adoption agency, trying to locate her son, where she describes her life with a different perspective. When asked how she would feel to meet her actual child, she replies that she would feel "nervous, but lucky".

In the end, Portia is now dating Pressman, and she receives a letter about her son, which says he is not ready to meet her yet. Pressman points out to her that she is on the waitlist "... and that's not so bad."

== Cast ==
- Tina Fey as Portia Nathan
- Paul Rudd as John Pressman
- Michael Sheen as Mark
- Wallace Shawn as Clarence
- Nat Wolff as Jeremiah
- Lily Tomlin as Susannah
- Gloria Reuben as Corinne
- Olek Krupa as Polokov
- Sonya Walger as Helen
- Christopher Evan Welch as Brandt
- Travaris Meeks-Spears as Nelson

== Production ==
The film was directed by Paul Weitz, known for his work on About a Boy, and was based on the novel of the same name by Jean Hanff Korelitz. The film was shot at the Princeton University campus, Hackley School in Tarrytown, New York, and at Manhattanville College in Purchase, New York. A trailer for the film was released on November 20, 2012. The film was released on March 22, 2013. Admission was the first major motion picture to use RushTera for post-production collaboration.

== Reception ==
On the review aggregator website Rotten Tomatoes, 37% of 154 critics' reviews are positive, with an average rating of 5.5/10. The website's consensus reads: "Admission has a pair of immensely likable leads in Tina Fey and Paul Rudd, but it wastes them on a contrived (and clumsily directed) screenplay." Metacritic, which uses a weighted average, assigned the film a score of 48 out of 100, based on 39 critics, indicating "mixed or average" reviews. Audiences polled by CinemaScore gave the film an average grade of "B−" on an A+ to F scale.
