= The F.B.I. (TV series) =

American television series

- Genre: Police procedural
- Starring: Efrem Zimbalist Jr. Philip Abbott; William Reynolds
- Country of origin: United States
- Original language: English
- No. of seasons: 9
- No. of episodes: 241 (list of episodes)

Production
- Executive producers: Quinn Martin; Philip Saltzman
- Running time: 60 minutes
- Production companies: QM Productions (1965–1974); Warner Bros. Television (1965–1967; 1970–1974); Warner Bros.- Seven Arts Television (1967–1970)

Original release
- Network: ABC
- Release: September 19, 1965 – April 28, 1974

Related
- Today's FBI (1981–1982)

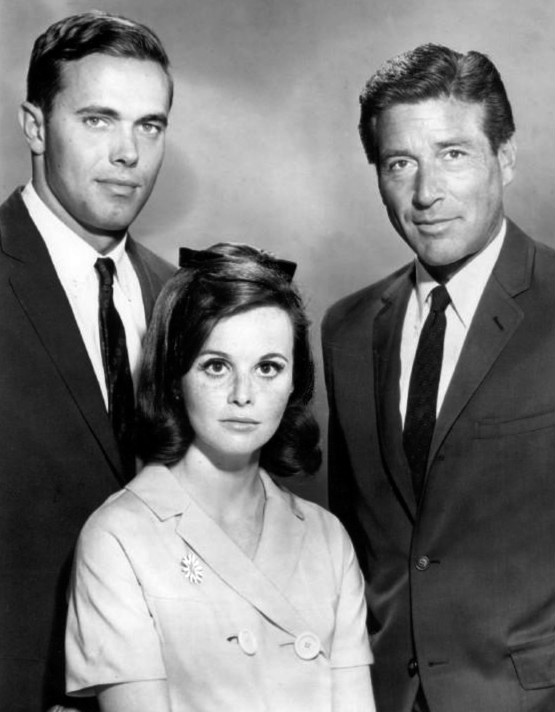
From left: Stephen Brooks, Lynn Loring and Efrem Zimbalist Jr., 1965.

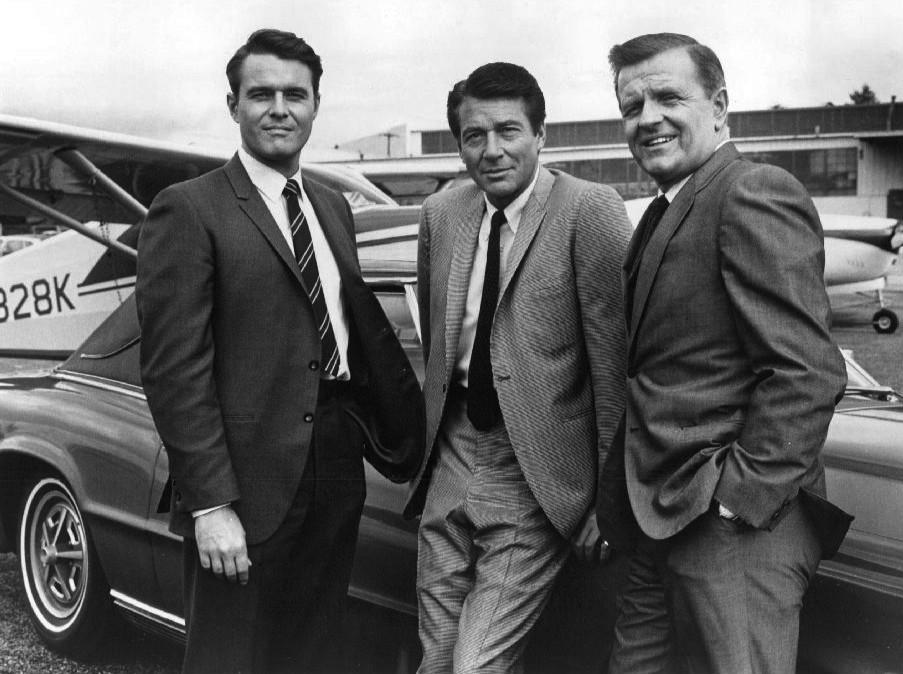
L–R: William Reynolds, Efrem Zimbalist Jr., and Philip Abbott (1969)

The F.B.I. is an American police procedural television series created by Quinn Martin and Philip Saltzman for ABC and co-produced with Warner Bros. Television, with sponsorship from the Ford Motor Company, Alcoa and American Tobacco Company (Tareyton and Pall Mall brands) in the first season. Ford sponsored the show alone for subsequent seasons. The series was broadcast on ABC from 1965 until its end in 1974. Starring Efrem Zimbalist Jr., Philip Abbott and William Reynolds, the series, consisting of nine seasons and 241 episodes, chronicles a group of FBI agents trying to defend the American government from unidentified threats. For the entirety of its run, it was broadcast on Sunday nights.

== Premise ==
Produced by Quinn Martin and based in part on concepts from the 1959 Warner Bros. theatrical film The FBI Story, the series was based on actual FBI cases, with fictitious main characters carrying the stories. Efrem Zimbalist Jr. played Inspector Lewis Erskine, a widower whose wife had been killed in an ambush meant for him. Philip Abbott played Arthur Ward, assistant director to FBI Director J. Edgar Hoover. Although Hoover served as series consultant until his death in 1972, he never appeared in the series.

Stephen Brooks played Inspector Erskine's assistant, Special Agent Jim Rhodes, for the first two seasons. Lynn Loring played Inspector Erskine's daughter and Rhodes' love interest, Barbara, in the twelve episodes of the show's first season. Although the couple were soon engaged on the show, that romantic angle was soon dropped.

In 1967, Brooks was replaced by William Reynolds, who played Special Agent Tom Colby until 1973. The series would enjoy its highest ratings during this time, peaking at No. 10 in the 1970–1971 season. For the final season, Shelly Novack played Special Agent Chris Daniels.

Some episodes ended with a "most wanted" segment hosted by Zimbalist, noting the FBI's most wanted criminals of the day, decades before the Fox Network aired America's Most Wanted. The most famous instance was in the April 21, 1968, episode, when Zimbalist asked for information about fugitive James Earl Ray, who was being hunted for the assassination of Martin Luther King Jr.

The series aired on ABC at 8 p.m. Sunday from 1965 to 1973, when it was moved up to 7:30 p.m. for the final season. The series was a co-production of Quinn Martin Productions and Warner Bros. Television, as Warner Bros. held the television and theatrical rights to any project based on The FBI Story. It was the longest-running of all of Quinn Martin's television series, airing nine seasons.

Every detail of every episode of the series was carefully vetted by F.B.I. second-in-command Clyde Tolson. Actors playing F.B.I. agents, and other participants, were given background checks to guarantee that no "criminals, subversives, or Communists" were associated with the show. The premiere episode of the first season, "The Monster," about a handsome serial killer who strangled women with their own hair, so shocked Tolson that he recommended the show be cancelled. J. Edgar Hoover attempted to cancel the show on at least seven other occasions. Upon Tolson's direction, the violence in the show was severely curtailed in the final three seasons.

I mean people always thought that each show was based on an FBI case. That was bullshit! We were just remaking those old Warner pictures. At least that's how I felt.

— Ralph Senensky, The F.B.I. director

== Cast ==
- Efrem Zimbalist Jr. as Lead Inspector Lewis Erskine
- Philip Abbott as Arthur Ward, Assistant Director
- William Reynolds as Special Agent Tom Colby
- Lynn Loring as Barbara Erskine, daughter of Inspector Erskine (season 1)
- Stephen Brooks as Special Agent Jim Rhodes (seasons 1 and 2)
- Shelly Novack as Special Agent Chris Daniels (season 9)
- Dean Harens as Special Agent Bryan Durant
- Lew Brown as Special Agent Allen Bennett
- Anthony Eisley as Special Agent Chet Randolph (recurring role)
- Hank Brandt as Special Agent William Converse (recurring role)

== Guest stars ==
- James B. Sikking S1E7 The Problem with the Honorable Wife, S1E20 Quantico, S2E3 The Assassin, S2E20 The Conspirators, S2E22 The Hostage, S2E25 The Executioners: Part 1, S4E1 Wind It Up and It Betrays You, S6E1 The Condemned, S6E26 Three-Way Split, S7E9 The Game of Terror, S9E10 Deadly Ambition
- Robert Duvall S1E10 The Giant Killer, S2E5 The Scourge, S2E25 The Executioners: Part 1, S4E9 The Harvest, S5E2 Nightmare Road
- Norman Fell S1E11 All the Streets Are Silent, S3E27 The Mercenary, S4E22 The Catalyst
- Robert H. Harris S2E18 A question of Guilt, S8E23 Sweet Evil
- John Davidson S7E18 Judas Goat
- Michele Carey S5E16 Tug-of-War
- Jon Cypher S9E23 Survival
- William Shatner S6E10 Antennae of Death
- Jason Evers S1E7&23 The Problem of the Honorable Wife & Flight to Harbin
- Antoinette Bower S2E24 Flight Plan, S3E10 Blueprint for Betrayal, S6E2 The Traitor, S9E5 The Exchange
- Julie Adams S5E9 Blood Tie
- Fritz Weaver S2E12 The Camel's Nose, S3E27 The Mercenary, S5E8 The Challenge, S7E4 Dynasty of Hate
- Darlene Carr S6E5 The Savage Wilderness, S8E6 End of a Nightmare
- Gary Lockwood S9E16 The Animal
- Arthur O'Connell S1E15 The Hijackers
- Diane Keaton S7E8 The Watch-Dog
- Alf Kjellin S3E10 Blueprint of Betrayal, S5E20 Deadly Reunion
- Claudine Longet S4E18 Caesar's Wife
- Kevin McCarthy S1E21 The Spy Master, S3E2 Counter-Stroke, S4E3 Conspiracy of Silence
- Robert Colbert S1E16 The Forests of the Night
- Gene Raymond S6E15 The Inheritors
- George D. Wallace S2E7 Ordeal, S6E18 Eye of the Needle
- Estelle Winwood S1E1 The Monster
- John Marley S9E8 Rules of the Game
- Chad Everett S4E13 The Hero
- Mark Miller S8E12 Holiday of Terror
- Charles Cioffi S7E17 The Break-Up, S9E13 A Piece of the Action
- Clu Gulager S7E6&7 The Mastermind: Parts 1&2
- Pete Duel S1E4 Slow March Up a Steep Hill, S3E11 False Witness
- Robert F.Lyons S1E23 Flight of Harbin, S3E3 Blood Verdict, S8E26 The Loper Gambit
- Charles Bronson S1E29 The Animal
- Robert Walker Jr. S1E20 Quantico, S3E22 The Messenger
- Burt Reynolds S1E11 All the Streets Are Silent, S3E15 Act of Violence
- Cicely Tyson S4E6 The Enemies, S5E5 Silent Partner
- Wesley Addy S1E11&30 All the streets Are Silent & The Plunderers, S2E25 The Executioners: Part 1, S4E16 The Fraud, S5E5 Silent Partner
- Suzanne Pleshette S2E13 List for a Firing Squad, S3E27 The Mercenary, S6E14 The Inheritors
- Steve Ihnat S2E2 The Escape, S3E20 Region of Peril, S4E20 The Maze, S5E13 The Prey, S6E13 Incident in the Desert, S7E6&7 The Mastermind: Parts 1&2
- Robert Foxworth S7E22 The Test, S8E20 The Double Play, S9E20 The Lost Man
- John Van Dreelen S1E26&27 The Defector Parts 1&2, S2E9 Vendetta, S3E7 A Sleeper Wakes, S5E20 Deadly Reunion
- Murray Hamilton S2E12 The Camel's Nose, S3E23 The Ninth Man, S4E17 A Life in the Balance, S6E12 The Witness
- Bill Williams S4E4 The Runaways, S9E20 The Lost Man
- Harrison Ford S4E18 Caesar's Wife, S5E11 Scapegoat
- Arthur Hill S1E23 Flight to Harbin, S2E6 The Plague Merchant, S3E5&6 By Force and Violence: Parts 1&2, S4E21 The Attorney
- Ron Howard S4E4 The Runaways
- Fred Beir S4E25 The Cober List, S5E21 Pressure Point, S7E13 Bitter Harbor, S9E12 Ransom
- Sarah Marshall S2E11 The Contaminator, S3E19 The Phone Call
- Sharon Farrell S9E17 The Two Million Dollar Hit
- Barry Morse S4E10 The Flaw
- Lawrence Pressman S6E16 The Stalking Horse
- Bettye Ackerman S3E18 Homecoming, S5E13 The Prey, S6E10 Antennae of Death
- Warren Oates S6E24 Turnabout
- Barry Nelson S5E16 Tug-of-War
- Paul Carr S6E13 Incident in the Desert, S8E9 The Wizard
- Harry Townes S1E16 The Forests of the Night
- Dana Wynter S1E26&27 The Defector Parts 1&2, S3E7 A Sleeper Wakes, S5E20 Deadly Reunion, S7E4 Deadly Gift
- Leslie Charleson S8E26 The Loper Gambit
- Anne Francis S5E25 Deadfall, S9E12 Ransom
- James Olson S5E18 Conspiracy of Corruption, S6E3 Escape of Terror, S9E The Betrayal
- Leslie Nielsen S1E14 Pound of Flesh, S9E9 Fool's Gold
- Wayne Rogers S1E28 The Tormentors, S2E29 The Extortionist, S3E12&23 The Legend of John Rim & The Ninth Man, S5E25 Deadfall, S6E2 The Traitor, S7E11 Superstition Rock
- Donna Mills S6E23 The Hitchhiker, S7E17 The Break-Up
- Roger Perry S4E16 The Fraud, S6E12 The Witness, S7E20 Arrangement of Terror, S8E22 The Detonator, S9e16 The Animal
- Woodrow Parfrey S6E15 The Victim Unknown
- Norman Alden S8E9 The Wizard, S9E17 The Two Million Dollar Hit
- Larry Gates S1E12 An Elephant Is Like a Rope, S2E18 A Question of Guilt, S3E1 The Gold Card, S4E9 The Harvest, S5E26 The Quest, S8E26 The Loper Gambit
- Simon Scott S1E24 The Man Who Went Mad By Mistake, S2E19 The Gray Passenger, S3E1&16 The Gold Card & Crisis Ground, S4E2 Out of Control, S5E6 Gamble with Death
- Cameron Mitchell S7E13 Bitter Harbor
- Lloyd Nolan S9E10 The Killing Truth
- Murray Matheson S2E24 Flight Plan, S5E19 The Diamond Millstone
- Jill Haworth S1E6 To Free My Enemy, S8E17 A Gathering of Sharks
- Linden Chiles S2E11 The Contaminator, S3E25 The Predators, S4E21 The Attorney, S5E1 Target of Interest, S7E18 Judas Goat
- James Caan S4E17 A Life in the Balance
- Tom Skerritt S2E3 The Assassin, S3E12 The Legend of John Rim, S6E15 Unknown Victim, S7E24 The Deadly Species
- Don Stroud S6E5 The Savage Wilderness, S9E3 Break-In
- Lin McCarthy S1E9 The Exiles, S2E5 The Scourge, S4E24 The Young Warriors, S5E22 Summer Terror
- Carl Betz S5E4 Boomerang, S6E22 Downfall
- Don Gordon S3E6&7 By Force and Violence: Parts 1&2, S4E25 The Cober List, S5E16 Tug-of-War, S8E15 Dark Christmas, S9E19 Deadly Ambition
- Edward Binns S3E26 The Tunnel, S5E24 The Dealer
- Peter Graves S2E21 Rope of Gold
- Peter Haskell S6E26 Three-Way Split, S9E14 Selkirk's War
- Richard Kiley S3E18 Homecoming, S6E16 Eye of the Needle, S7E19 The Hunters
- Jackie Cooper S9E3 Break-In
- Dabney Coleman S1E4&15 Slow March up a Steep Hill & The Hijackers, S2E20 The Conspirators, S5E7 Flight, S6E13 Incident in the Desert, S7E9 The Game of Terror, S9E23 Survival
- Dawn Wells S4E21 The Attorney
- Benson Fong S1E32 The Hiding Place
- Andrew Prine S3E24 The Mechanized Accomplice, S7E1 Death on Sunday, S8E23 Sweet Evil
- John McIntire S1E15 The Hijackers, S2E4 The Cave-In, S7E3 The Last Job
- Jessica Walter S1E23 Flight to Harbi, S2E21 Rope of Gold, S3E2 Counter-Stroke, S4E5 Death of a Fixer, S7E14 The Recruiter, S8E17 A Gathering of Sharks
- Sorrell Booke S6E19 The Fatal Connection
- Elizabeth Ashley S9E18 Diamond Run
- Penny Fuller S5E15 The Doll Courier, S7E24 The Deadly Species, S8E21 The Wedding Gift
- Bruce Dern S1E14 Pound of Flesh, S4E7 The Nightmare
- Jessica Tandy S7E21 The Set-Up
- Diane Baker S2E12 The Camel's Nose, S4E9 The Harvest, S5E1 Target of Interest
- Joan Van Ark S4E20 The Maze, S6E1 The Condemned, S7E4 The Deadly Gift, S9E21 The Vendetta
- Albert Salmi S1E30 The Plunderers, S6E26 Three Way Split, S8E11 Canyon of No Return
- Robert Quarry S9E15 The Betrayal
- Richard Evans S5E19 The Diamond Millstone, S6E13 Incident in the Desert, S8E14 The Outcast
- Jan Shepard S3E9 Line of Fire, S4E4 The Runaways
- Patrick O'Neal S1E25 The Spy-Master, S8E8 A Game of Chess
- Michael Tolan S3E17 Ring of Steel, S4E1 Wind It Up and It Betrays You, S5E9 Blood Tie, S8E2 Edge of Desperation, S9E15 The Betrayal
- Nan Martin S4E16 The Fraud, S5E11 Scapegoat, S7E19 The Hunters
- Kurt Russell S1E28 The Tormentors
- Viveca Lindfors S3E7 A Sleeper Wakes, S5E15 The Doll Courier
- Gene Hackman S2E17 The Courier
- Jacqueline Scott S1E25 The Divided Man, S2E7 Ordeal, S8E2 Edge of Desperation, S9E4 The Pay-Off
- Ross Martin S8E9 The Wizard
- Patricia Smith S1E10 The Giant Killer, S3E7 A Sleeper Wakes, S4E7 The Nightmare, S8E7 The Engineer
- Ivan Dixon S6E8 The Deadly Pact
- Richard Carlson S4E26 Moment of Truth
- Billy Dee Williams S4E15 Eye of the Storm, S5E10 The Sanctuary, S6E4 The Architect
- William Schallert S5E3 The Swindler, S7E25 Dark Journey
- Scott Marlowe S2E1 The Price of Death, S3E8&26 Overland & The Tunnel, S4E24 The Young Warriors, S5E9 Blood Tie, S6E19 The Fatal Connection, S7E6&7 The mastermind: Parts 1&2, S8E16 The Rap Taker, S9E5 The Exchange
- Robert Blake S2E1 The Price of Death
- R.G. Armstrong S1E3 A Mouthful of Dust, S2E29 The Extortionist, S3E3 Blood Verdict
- Pat Hingle S8E24 Memory of a Legend
- Norma Crane S3E3 Blood Verdict, S5E17 Fatal Impostor
- Paul Lukas S1E26&27 The Defector: Parts 1&2, S2E22 The Hostage
- Edward Andrews S1E8 Courage of a Conviction, S4E8 Breakthrough, S6E26 Three-Way Split
- Lois Nettleton S2E9 Vendetta, S6E7 The Innocents
- Keye Luke S1E26&32 The Spy-Master & The hiding Place, S2E17 The Courier, S8E24 Memory of a Legend
- Robert Loggia S6E8 The Deadly Pact, S7E20 Arrangement with Terror
- Richard Jaeckel S6E21 Death Watch, S9E14 Selkirk's War
- Hari Rhodes S6E8 The Deadly Pact, S9E7 Fatal Reunion
- Barry Williams S3E22 The Messenger
- Nancy Wilson S9E2 The Confession
- Ed Begley S1E18 The Sacrifice
- Bradford Dillman S1E25 The Divided Man S2E23 Sky on Fire, S3E21 Southwind, S6E2 The Traitor, S7E6&7 The Mastermind: Parts 1&2
- Malcolm Atterbury S1E14 Pound of Flesh, S2E8 Collison Course
- Peter Donat S5E3 The Swindler
- Michael Douglas S6E23 The Hitchhiker
- Dana Elcar S3E22 The Messenger, S4E24 The Young Warriors, S6E19 The Fatal Connection, S7E11 Superstition Rock, S9E7 Fatal Reunion
- Robert Urich S8E1 The Runner
- Joanna Moore S3E1&26 The Gold Card & The Tunnel, S5E13 The Prey
- Tom Bosley S3E17 Ring of Steel
- Joe Don Baker S5E22 Summer Terror
- Reni Santoni S7E20 Arrangement with Terror, S8E5 The Gopher
- Harold J. Stone S4E25 The Cober List
- Beau Bridges S1E12 An Elephant is Like a Rope
- David Hedison S7E15 The Buyer, S8E17 A Gathering of Sharks
- Robert Hogan S1E6&11 To Free My Enemy & All The Streets Are Silent, S3E&6 By Force and Violence: Parts 1&2, S3E6 Crisis Ground, S8E9 The Wizard
- Paul Richards S9E4 The Pay-Off
- Tim McIntire S1E29 The Animal, S2E4&27 The Cave-In & The Satellite, S6E1 The Condemned, S7E2 Recurring Nightmare, S8E20 The Double Play
- Steve Forrest S6E16 The Stalking Horse
- Joseph Campanella S2E10 Anatomy of a Prison Break, S4E5 Death of a Fixer, S8E3 The Fatal Showdown
- Ed Asner S1E28 The Tormentors, S3E13 The Dynasty, S4E21 The Attorney
- Don Dubbins S1E18 The Sacrifice, S2E18 A Question of Guilt, S4E15 Eye of the Storm
- Gary Crosby S6E19 The Fatal Connection
- Philip Ahn S1E32 The Hiding Place
- Laurence Luckinbill S9E18 Diamond Run
- Miiko Taka S1E7 The Problem of the honorable wife
- Henry Silva S3E9 Line of Fire, S7E5 Dynasty of Hate, S9E17 The Two Million Dollar Hit
- Anne Helm S2E28 Force of Nature, S3E23 The Ninth Man, S4E11 The Butcher, S5E6 Gamble With Death
- Hal Linden S9E2 The Confession
- Moses Gunn S4E15 Eye of the Storm
- Susan Oliver S1E8 Courage of a Conviction, S9E7 Fatal Reunion
- Robert Hooks S5E5 Silent Partner, S9E19 Deadly Ambition
- Cecil Kellaway S1E15 The Hijackers
- Claude Akins S1E13 How to Murder an Iron Horse, S7E25 Dark Journey
- Louise Latham S1E13 How to Murder an Iron Horse, S2E23 Sky on Fire, S3E5&6 By Force and Violence: Parts 1&2, S4E21 Southwind
- Gene Tierney S4E23 Conspiracy of Silence
- Jack Lord S2E8 Collision Course
- Elizabeth Allen S2E14 The Death Wind
- Charles Aidman S1E32 The Hiding Place, S3E26 The Tunnel
- Anne Baxter S3E20 Region of Peril
- John Vernon S3E21 Southwind, S5E14 Journey Into Night, S7E26 Escape to Nowhere, S9E21 The Vendetta
- Martha Scott S3E8 Overload
- Lloyd Bochner S5E12 The Inside Man
- John Anderson S1E16 The Forests of the Night, S8E10 The Loner
- Ruth Roman S2E17 The Courier
- Dorothy Provine S4E8 Breakthrough
- James Franciscus S2E28 Force of Nature, S4E2 Out of Control
- Al Freeman Jr. S4E6 The Enemies
- Alex Rocco S8E14 The Outcast
- Nita Talbot S2E15 The Raid
- Joseph Wiseman S7E13 Bitter Harbor, S9E4 The Pay-Off
- Frank Dekova S8E25 Night of the Long Knives, S9E11 The Bought Jury
- Diana Hyland S2E22 The Hostage, S3E8 Overload, S6E16 The Stalking Horse, S7E20 Arrangement with Terror
- Joe Maross S1E11&31 All the Streets Are Silent & The Bomb That Walked Like a Man
- Meg Foster S7E16 A Second Life, S9E16 The Animal
- Frank Converse S7E1 Death on Sunday, S8E11 Canyon of No Return
- Lynda Day George S2E23 Sky on Fire, S3E9 Line of Fire, S4E14 The Widow, S5E23 Return to Power
- Vera Miles S5E3 The Swindler
- George Murdock S1E15 The Hijackers, S2E10 Anatomy of a Prison Break, S9E14 Selkirk's War
- Harry Guardino S6E3 Escape to Terror
- Gary Collins S6E17 Center of Peril
- Sharon Acker S7E8 The Watch_Dog
- Collin Wilcox S1E22 The Baby Sitter, S2E16 Passage Into Fear
- Colleen Dewhurst S1E22 The Baby Sitter
- Jack Klugman S1E2 Image in a Cracked Mirror, S5E19 The Diamond Millstone
- John Larch S2E1 The Price of Death, S8E14 The Outcast
- Harold Gould S1E4 Slow March Up a Steep Hill, S1E24 The Man Who Went Mad by Mistake, S2E17 The Courier, S3E14 The Daughter, S4E11 The Butcher, S6E16 The Stalking Horse, S7E22 The Test
- Jeffrey Hunter S1E1 The Monster, S4E6 The Enemies
- Michael Rennie S2E20 The Conspirators, S3E14 The Daughter, S4E18 Caesar's Wife
- Walter Pidgeon S2E25&26 The Executioners: Parts 1&2
- Arthur Franz S2E20 The Conspirators, S3E20 Region of Peril, S5E11 Scapegoat, S6E4 The Architect, S7E14 The Recruiter
- Andrew Duggan S1E31 The Bomb Walked Like a Man, S2E18 A Question of Guilt, S3E4 Traitor, S6E19 The Fatal Connection
- Jeff Bridges S5E4 Boomerang
- Dean Stockwell S4E3 The Quarry, S8E6 End of a Nightmare
- James Daly S1E17 The Chameleon, S3E1 The Gold Card, S4E23 Conspiracy of Silence
- Ralph Bellamy S2E14 The Death Wind, S4E11 The Butcher
- Simon Oakland S4E20 The Maze
- Richard Devon S3E1 The Gold Card, S4E3 The Quarry, S5E23 Return to Power, S8E2 Edge of Desperation
- Pilar Seurat S1E11 All the Streets Silent, S2E8 Collison Course, S3E3 Blood Verdict, S4E22 The Catalyst, S5E19 The Diamond Millstone
- Walter Burke S5E5 Silent Partner, S6E25 The Natural, S7E19 The Hunters, S9E17 The Million Dollar Hit
- Dean Jagger S2E3 The Assassin
- Vic Morrow S6E17 Center of Peril, S8E19 Desperate Journey
- Alfred Ryder S2E9 Vendetta, S4E25 The Cober List, S8E8 A Game of Chess, S9E7 Fatal Reunion
- Ed Nelson S7E10 End of a Hero, S8E7 The Engineer, S9E7 Fatal Runion
- Martin Sheen S3E13 The Dynasty, S6E1 The Condemned, S7E16 A Second Life, S8E18 The Disinherited
- Harvey Keitel S9E19 Deadly Ambition
- Telly Savalas S2E25&26 The Executioners: Parts 1&2
- Russell Johnson S3E13 The Dynasty, S4E18 Caesar's Wife, S5E26 The Quest
- Belinda Montgomery S7E2 Recurring Nightmare, S8E1 The Runner
- Dorothy Green S2E27 The Satellite
- Richard Anderson S2E8 Collision Course, S3E4&27 Traitor & The Mercenary, S4E6 The Enemies, S5E8 The Challenge, S8E4 The Franklin Papers, S9E1 The Big Job
- Oscar Beregi Jr. S1E5 The Insolents, S2E6&13 The Plague Merchant & List of a Firing Squad, S5E12 The Inside Man
- Katherine Justice S3E12 The Legend of John Rim, S5E18 Conspiracy of Corruption, S7E18 Judas Goat, S8E14 The Outcast
- Anthony Zerbe S9E8 Rules of the Game
- Virginia Christine S1E20 Quantico, S2E16 Passage into Fear, S4E13 The Hero
- Sondra Locke S8E15 Dark Christmas
- Hal Holbrook S4E16 The Fraud
- Peter Mark Richman S1E7 The Problem of the Honorable Wife, S2E14 The Death Wind, S3E25 The Predators, S4E8 Breakthrough, S5E23 Return to Power, S6E25 The Natural, S8E5 The Gopher, S9E16 The Animal
- Brenda Vaccaro S5E11 Scapegoat
- Gerald S. O'Loughlin S2E7 Ordeal, S5E17 Fatal Impostor, S7E21 The Set-Up
- James Gregory S1E6 To Free My Enemy, S9E21 The Vendetta
- Kent Smith S3E3 Blood Verdict, S4E23 Conspiracy of Silence, S6E9 The Impersonator, S8E2 Edge of Desperation
- Milton Selzer S1E23 Flight to Harbin, S2E1 The Price of Death, S3E23 The Ninth Man, S8E21 The Wedding Gift, S9E9 Fool's Gold
- J. D. Cannon S1E24 The Man Who Went Mad by Mistake, S2E24 Flight Plan, S4E4 The Runaways, S5E18 Conspiracy of Corruption
- Charles Korvin S2E13 List for a Firing Squad, S4E11 The Butcher, S6E20 The Replacement
- Peggy McCay S2E6 The Plague Merchant, S5E22 Summer Terror S6E23 The Hitchhiker, S8E9 The Wizard
- Davey Davison S1E22 The Baby Sitter, S2E23 Sky on Fire, S3E21 Southwind, S5E2 Nightmare Road
- Ralph Meeker S1E30 The Plunderers, S2E15 The Raid, S7E2 Recurring Nightmare
- Monte Markham S4E10 The Intermediary, S6E4 The Architect, S7E14 The Recruiter
- Marianne McAndrew S7E6&7 The Mastermind: Part2 1 & Part 2
- Dabbs Greer S1E25 The Divided Man, S2E22 Hostage, S3E5&6 By Force and Violence parts 1&2, S3E23 The Ninth Man, S4E4 The Runaways, S5E4 Journey into Night, S6E4 The Architect S7E5 Dynasty of Hate, S8E23 Sweet Evil

== Episodes ==
Season	Episodes	Originally released	
Season	Episodes	First released	Last released
1	32	September 19, 1965	May 8, 1966
2	29	September 18, 1966	April 16, 1967
3	27	September 17, 1967	April 28, 1968
4	26	September 22, 1968	March 30, 1969
5	26	September 14, 1969	March 8, 1970
6	26	September 20, 1970	March 21, 1971
7	26	September 12, 1971	March 19, 1972
8	26	September 17, 1972	April 1, 1973
9	23	September 16, 1973	April 28, 1974

== Home media ==
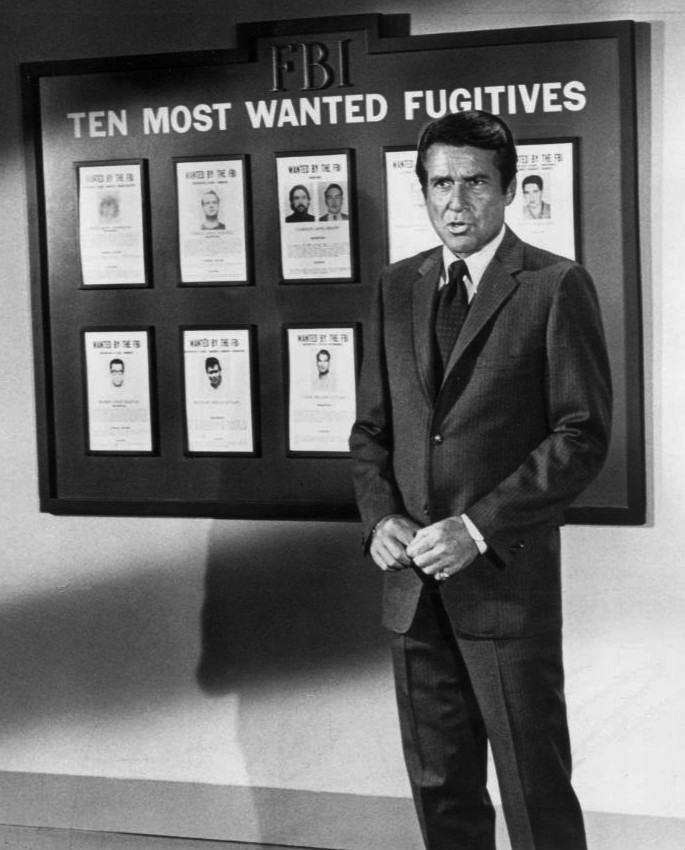
A 1969 "Ten Most Wanted List" segment; these were seen at the close of some episodes.

Warner Bros. (under the Warner Home Video label) has released all nine seasons of The F.B.I. on DVD in region 1 via their Warner Archive Collection. These are Manufacture-on-Demand (MOD) releases and are available through Warner's online store and Amazon.com. The ninth and final season was released on September 23, 2014.

DVD name	Ep #	Release date
The First Season, Part 1	16	May 24, 2011
The First Season, Part 2	16	August 2, 2011
The Second Season, Part 1	16	February 14, 2012
The Second Season, Part 2	13	February 14, 2012
The Third Season, Part 1	16	September 11, 2012
The Third Season, Part 2	11	September 11, 2012
The Fourth Season, Part 1	13	February 26, 2013
The Fourth Season, Part 2	13	February 26, 2013
The Fifth Season, Part 1	13	June 4, 2013
The Fifth Season, Part 2	13	June 4, 2013
The Sixth Season	26	October 15, 2013
The Seventh Season	26	February 25, 2014
The Eighth Season	26	June 10, 2014
The Ninth Season	23	September 23, 2014

In December 2023, Warner Bros. Discovery, via Warner Bros, Television Studios (current rights owner of the series) launched a free ad-supported streaming television (FAST) channel dedicated to the series and made all nine seasons of the series available for streaming online on Tubi.

== Similar series ==
- An updated and revamped version of the series, Today's FBI, executive produced by David Gerber for Columbia Pictures Television, aired on ABC from October 1981 through April 1982 in the same Sunday 8 p.m. time slot as its predecessor.
- A remake of the original series, produced by Ron Howard's Imagine Entertainment for Fox, was set for air in Fall 2008, but it didn't materialise.
- In September 2018, a similar series, titled FBI, debuted on CBS; this series was co-created by Dick Wolf and Craig Turk for Universal Television. Unlike The F.B.I. and Today's FBI, however, the cases presented are largely fictional. Would be followed by two spinoffs: FBI: Most Wanted and FBI: International.
