= RushTera =

RushTera is software as a service, that provides accelerated upload/download, storage, sharing and management of large media files. RushTera was first demonstrated in April 2012 at the NAB Show. The product is marketed by the New York company Attend LLC, which was founded in 2008. In 2012, RushTera was deployed on CloudSigma , but has since been redeployed on private infrastructure provided by Unitas Global. Attend's content ingest network, uses geographically distributed virtual machines to eliminate latency and provide fast uploads and downloads of huge files. RushTera became generally available in November 2012. Since then RushTera has been used by Focus Features during post production on several major motion pictures including Academy Award winner Dallas Buyers Club, as well as Kill The Messenger, The World's End, Black Sea, and Admission. Promax/BDA used RushTera as the submissions platform for its Hot Spots Showcase in both 2013 and 2014. Company CEO Chuck Stormon was interviewed in January 2013. Attend LLC / RushTera was selected as an alternate finalist (13th of 6,932 applicants) in 43North, the largest business idea competition in the world.
