= Jean Hanff Korelitz =

American novelist (born 1961)

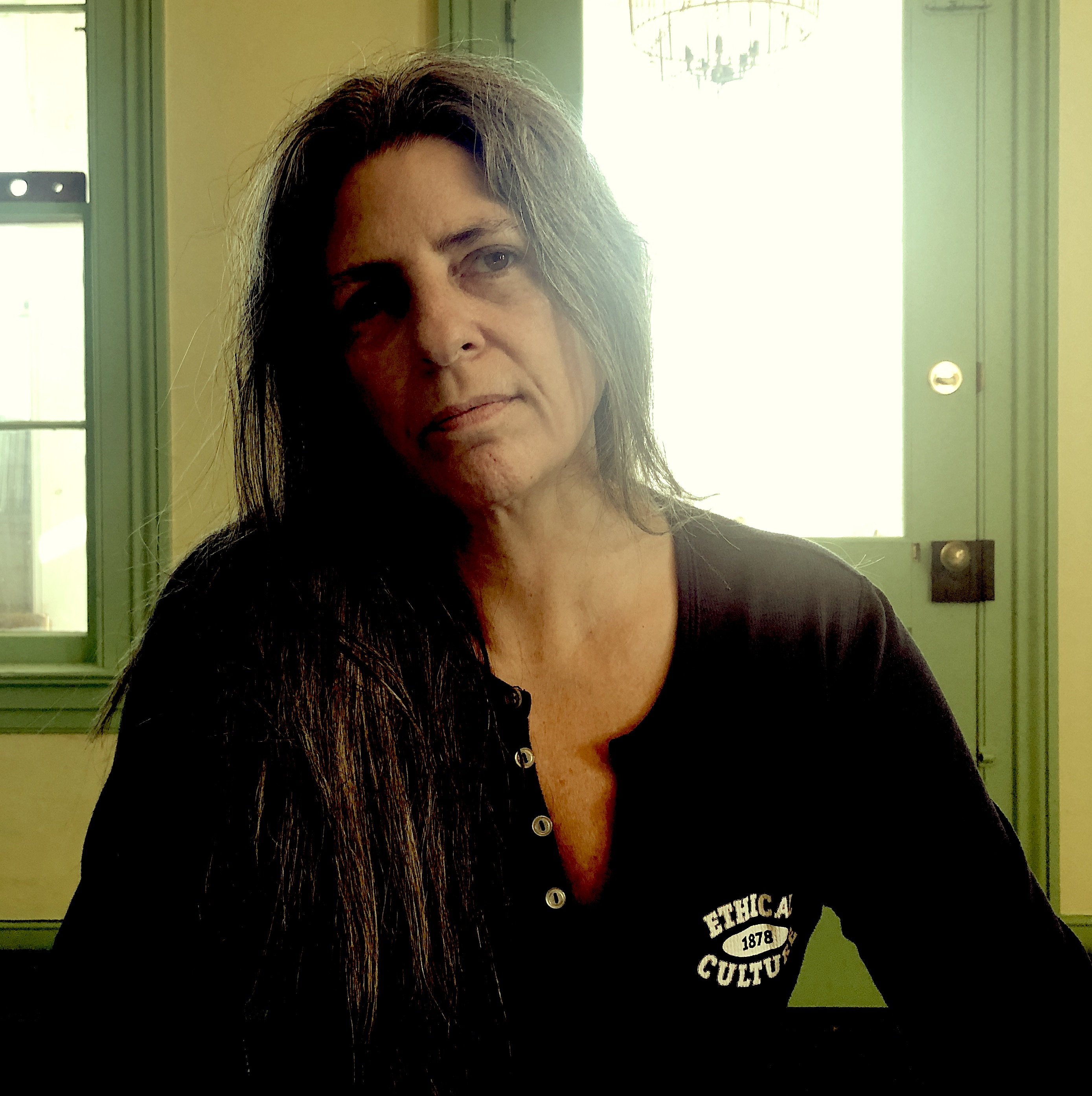
- Jean Hanff Korelitz
- Born: May 16, 1961 (age 65)
- Education: Dartmouth College; Clare College, Cambridge
- Occupation: Author
- Spouse: Paul Muldoon (m. 1987)
- Children: 2
- Writing career
- Notable works: Admission, The White Rose, You Should Have Known, The Plot, The Latecomer
- Website: www.jeanhanffkorelitz.com

Jean Hanff Korelitz (born May 16, 1961) is an American novelist, playwright, theater producer and essayist.

== Early life, family and education ==
Korelitz was born to Jewish parents and raised in New York City. She has a sister, Nina. Korelitz has recalled she “became an atheist at the age of eight."

She is related to Helene Hanff, the author of 84, Charing Cross Road.

After graduating from Dartmouth College with a degree in English, she continued her studies at Clare College, Cambridge, where she was awarded the Chancellor's Gold Medal.

== Career ==
Jean Hanff Korelitz has written articles and essays for many publications, including Real Simple magazine and the Modern Love column in The New York Times. Since 1996, nine of her novels have been published. Her most recent novel is The Sequel (2024).

In 2013 Korelitz created BOOKTHEWRITER, a New York City-based service that presents Pop-Up Book Groups with prominent authors in private homes. Approximately 20 events are held each year; groups are limited to 20. Past authors have included Joyce Carol Oates, Erica Jong, David Duchovny, Jeanine Cummins, Christina Baker Kline, Jane Green, Adriana Trigiani, Meghan Daum, Dani Shapiro, Darin Strauss, and Elizabeth Strout.

In 2015 Korelitz and her sister, Nina Korelitz Matza, created Dot Dot Productions, LLC, in order to produce The Dead, 1904, an immersive theater adaptation of James Joyce's short story "The Dead", with The Irish Repertory Theatre. The story was adapted by Korelitz and Paul Muldoon, her husband.

== Novels ==
=== A Jury of Her Peers and The Sabbathday River ===
Korelitz's first novel, A Jury of Her Peers, was a legal thriller about a Legal Aid lawyer who uncovers a jury tampering plot, which Kirkus called "a monstrous-conspiracy wolf in legal-intrigue clothing."

Her second novel, The Sabbathday River, transplanted elements of the plot of Nathaniel Hawthorne's The Scarlet Letter to a small community near Hanover, New Hampshire, and described a case of infanticide and a resulting trial.

=== The White Rose ===
Korelitz's third novel, The White Rose, transposed the plot and characters of the Richard Strauss opera Der Rosenkavalier to 1990s New York City. In The New York Times Book Review, reviewer Elizabeth Judd described The White Rose as "incisive and urbane ... (hearkening) back to the gender confusions of Shakespeare's comedies" and called the novel "a significant step forward" following Korelitz's earlier legal thrillers. Anthony Giardina, reviewing the novel in the San Francisco Chronicle, complained that the character of Oliver was occasionally unconvincing but called the academic details of Sophie's and Marian's lives "spot-on". The Boston Globe's reviewer, Barbara Fisher, wrote: "Within the comic plot of this lighthearted novel lies a weightier theme. Having played around with disguises, cross-dressing, and self-delusion, the characters happily gain the prize of self-knowledge."

=== Admission ===
Admission, published in April 2009, was reviewed in the Education supplement of The New York Times by a high school senior who compared the college application process to the heroine's mid-life crisis. Entertainment Weekly gave the novel an A− rating and called it "that rare thing in a novel: both juicy and literary, a genuinely smart read with a human, beating heart." In its review, Huffington Post reviewer Malcolm Ritter singled out the "atmosphere and details" of the admissions office setting. "That's fascinating for us who've gotten good or bad news from colleges for which we yearned, or shepherded ambitious children through the gauntlet of the application process." The Wall Street Journal criticized the novel for its "wooden monologues" and "improbable love story".

Admission was adapted by screenwriter Karen Croner for the 2013 film of the same name, starring Tina Fey.

=== You Should Have Known ===
Grand Central Publishing published Korelitz's fifth novel, You Should Have Known, in March 2014. The book tells the story of a New York therapist who discovers that her beloved husband has a secret and unfathomable life and may have been responsible for a murder. The book was published in eighteen languages. The Undoing, an HBO adaptation, was broadcast in 2020 starring Nicole Kidman, Hugh Grant, Donald Sutherland, Matilda De Angelis, Lily Rabe, Edgar Ramirez, Noah Jupe and Noma Dumezweni and directed by Susanne Bier.

=== The Devil and Webster ===
Grand Central Publishing published Korelitz's sixth novel, The Devil and Webster, in March 2017. Formerly a VISTA volunteer in Goddard, New Hampshire, Naomi Roth is now a feminist scholar and the first female president of Webster College in Central Massachusetts. Webster College, which shares some characteristics with Wesleyan University and others with Dartmouth College, is a liberal arts college known for left-leaning and activist undergraduates. In a plot that mirrors the student unrest of recent years, the Webster community erupts in student protests over the denial of tenure to an African-American professor of anthropology. Roth, whose daughter Hannah is a Webster sophomore, discovers that her own activist past has not prepared her to handle the protest, which quickly spirals out of control. On NPR's Fresh Air, Maureen Corrigan described it as "a smart semi-satire about the reign of identity politics on college campuses today."

=== The Plot ===
Celadon Books, a division of Macmillan, published Korelitz's seventh novel, The Plot, in spring 2021. The novel concerns Jacob Finch Bonner, a writer with a fading career who appropriates the plot of his deceased student's unwritten novel. The resulting book becomes a publishing phenomenon, but its author begins to receive messages from someone who claims to know what he did. In late 2021, it was announced actor Mahershala Ali was signed on to star in a limited series adaptation of The Plot.

=== The Latecomer ===
Korelitz's eighth novel, The Latecomer, was published by Celadon Books on May 31, 2022. Described as a slow-building literary novel, The Latecomer revolves around the wealthy New York-based Oppenheimer family, where the Oppenheimer triplets' lives are upended by the arrival of a fourth, unexpected sibling. In February 2022, it was reported that the novel would be adapted into a television series from Bruna Papandrea's Made Up Stories and Kristen Campo.

=== The Sequel ===
Korelitz's ninth novel, The Sequel, was published by Celadon Books on October 1, 2024. It is the sequel to The Plot, her seventh novel.

== Theater work ==
In 2015 Korelitz and her sister, Nina Korelitz Matza, created Dot Dot Productions LLC to produce The Dead, 1904. It was produced for The Irish Repertory Theatre in The American Irish Historical Society from November 2016 through January 2017, starring Kate Burton as Gretta Conroy and Boyd Gaines as Gabriel Conroy and received generally favorable reviews. A second production, from November 2017 through January 2018 starred Melissa Gilbert as Gretta Conroy and Rufus Collins as Gabriel Conroy. A third production from November 2018 through January 2019 featured most of the remaining cast, including Melissa Gilbert and Rufus Collins reprising their roles, with the addition of American tenor Robert Mack as Bartell D'Arcy. A fourth production of "The Dead, 1904" took place in 2024 starring Kate Baldwin as Gretta and Christopher Innvar as Gabriel, with Mary Beth Peil as Aunt Julia.

Gallery Press published The Dead, 1904 in November 2018.

== Film and television adaptations ==
Korelitz's book Admission is the basis for the film of the same name. The film was adapted from the novel by Karen Croner and directed by Paul Weitz. It stars Tina Fey and Paul Rudd, as well as Lily Tomlin, Wallace Shawn, Nat Wolff, and Gloria Reuben. The film was released in the US on March 22, 2013. David E. Kelley's adaptation of You Should Have Known, renamed HBO's The Undoing, starring Nicole Kidman, Hugh Grant, Donald Sutherland and Noah Jupe, aired in October 2020. The Plot and The Latecomer are both in development for film or television adaptations.

== Personal life ==
While living in England, Korelitz met Irish poet Paul Muldoon. The couple married on August 30, 1987, and went on to have two children: Dorothy (born 1992) and Asher (born 1999). From 1990 until 2013, on they lived in Princeton, New Jersey, where Muldoon has long taught Creative Writing. They have resided in New York City since 2013.
