= Melissa Murphy =

American chef

Melissa Murphy is the executive chef and owner of Sweet Melissa Patisserie, Sweet Melissa Crémerie, as well as the author of The Sweet Melissa Baking Book.

== Background ==
Melissa Murphy is a native of New York City who graduated in 1995 from The French Culinary Institute, where she currently serves on the Advisory Board Committee. She has written articles for magazines such as Bon Appétit, Food & Wine, Fine Cooking, and Pastry Art & Design, Bride's Magazine, Fine Cooking, Quick and Simple and The New York Times Magazine. In 1998 Murphy opened her first bakery, Sweet Melissa Patisserie, in Brooklyn. Eight years later she opened her second bakery. She competed on the "TV Food Network Challenge: Edible Ornaments" (December 2007), where she captured the grand prize. She has a series of informational baking videos available for viewing on the Podcast Go! Network.

== Patisseries ==
Sweet Melissa's Patisserie's flagship location was at 175 7th Avenue, in Park Slope Brooklyn, but it closed in October 2013. In 2015, Sweet Melissa's Patisserie re-opened its doors at a new location at 56 Payne Road in Lebanon, NJ .
