= Conspiracy (board game) =

1973 board game

Conspiracy is a 1973 board game made by Milton Bradley. It can be played by 3 or 4 people, and the main goal is to bring a suitcase to their own headquarters through the use of spies. It has also been published as The Sigma File.

== About ==
Conspiracy is a family game that was developed by British game-designer Eric Solomon. It is recommended that the game best be played with 4 players. The game takes approximately 90 minutes to play and is for ages 8 and up. Conspiracy requires three skills in order to win: betting/wagering, bluffing, and memory.

== Details ==
Within the game there are four capitals, four bankbooks, one top secret briefcase, and eight spies that any player can control. The objective to the game is to move the briefcase to your headquarters. Each player has an account of $10,000 and has the opportunity to either secretly pay off or openly move a spy one space on their turn. Each player can also bribe spies in smaller increments of at least $100. Once a spy is moved, another player can challenge that move. If this is to happen, the two players then reveal how much money each has spent on the spy. If the challenger wins, the move is revoked. If the defender wins, the move stays and the challenger loses his or her next turn. Players must cooperate against whichever player is closest to victory. Each player can make secret plans to openly swipe the case or murder a spy and completely turn the tables on a player who is close to winning. This game has no dice and no cards so no luck is involved. Players must work together or the game will end quickly.

== Honors ==
- 1991 Spiel des Jahres Recommended

== Reviews ==
- Games & Puzzles
- Games & Puzzles #16

== Versions ==
- Amigo version (Casablanca) published in 1991 can be played with up to 8 players.

== Publishers ==
The game was published by the following:

- AMIGO Spiel + Freizeit GmbH
- Clipper
- Condor
- Gibsons Games
