= Plott (disambiguation) =

Plott Hound is a dog breed and the official State Dog of North Carolina.

Plott is a surname. It may refer to:

- Charles Plott (born 1938), American economist
- Kyle Plott (born 1996), American stock car racing driver
- Nicolas Plott (born 1984), American esports commentator
- Sean Plott (born 1986), American esports commentator

It may also refer to:

- Plott Balsams, mountain range in western North Carolina
