= Plot Twist (disambiguation) =

A plot twist is a literary technique that introduces a radical change in the direction or expected outcome of the plot in a work of fiction.

Plot twist may also refer to:

- "Plot Twist" (Sigrid song), 2017
- "Plot Twist" (TWS song), 2024
- "Plot Twist" (Drake song), 2026
- "Plot Twist", a song by Marc E. Bassy from the album Gossip Columns, 2017
