= Conspiracy theory (disambiguation) =

A conspiracy theory is an allegation that a certain event or events are secretly influenced by a premeditated group or groups of powerful people or organizations working together.

Conspiracy theory and conspiracy theories may also refer to:

== Related concepts ==
- Conspiracy theory (legal term), a theory of a case that presents a conspiracy to be considered by a trier of fact

As part of political tropes

- Islamophobic trope
- Antisemitic trope

== Media ==
- Conspiracy Theory (film), 1997 film starring Mel Gibson and Julia Roberts, directed by Richard Donner
- Conspiracy Theory with Jesse Ventura, TV series hosted by former Governor of Minnesota Jesse Ventura
- Conspiracy Theories, 2006 progressive jazz album by Phil Miller's In Cahoots
- "Conspiracy Theories", an academic paper by Cass Sunstein and Adrian Vermeule
- "Conspiracy Theory" (Mutant X), a 2004 television episode
