= Pilar Seurat =

Filipino American actress (1938 – 2001)

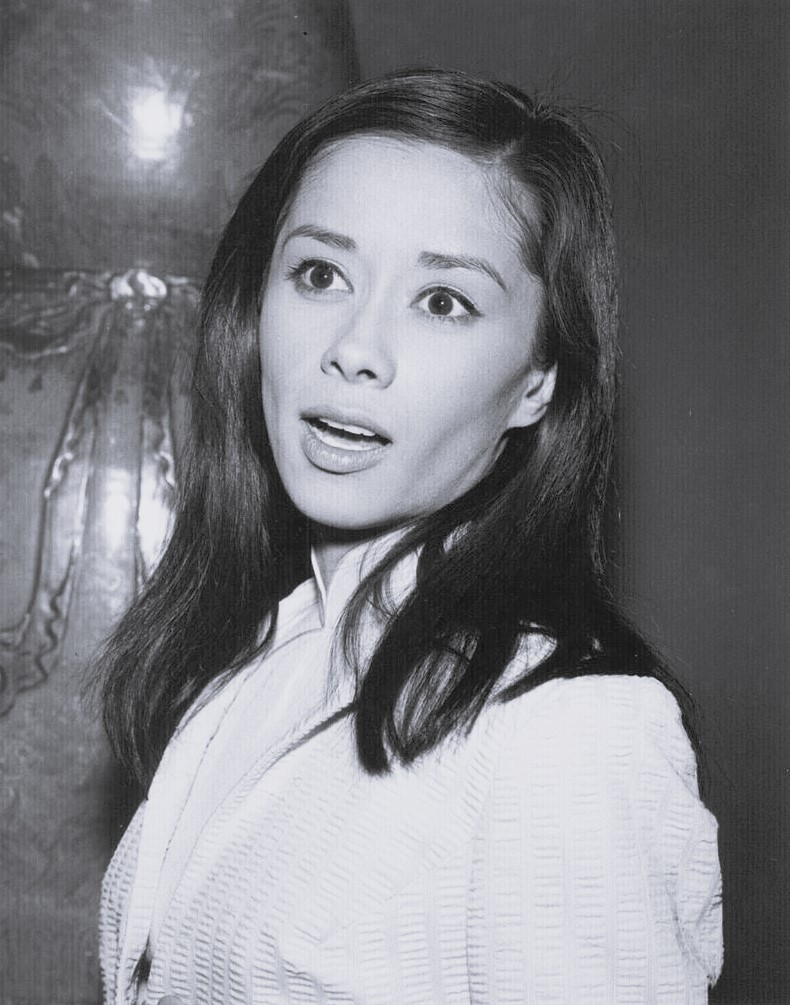
- Seurat in an episode of I Spy (1965)
- Born: Rita Hernandez; July 25, 1938; Manila, Commonwealth of the Philippines
- Died: June 2, 2001 (aged 62); Los Angeles, California, U.S.
- Resting place: Forest Lawn Memorial Park Cemetery
- Occupations: Film, television actress
- Years active: 1959–1972
- Spouse: Don Devlin (m. 1959; div. 1963) Don Cerveris (m. 1970; div. 1981)
- Children: Dean Devlin
- Relatives: Lisa Brenner (daughter-in-law)

Pilar Seurat (born Rita Hernandez; July 25, 1938 – June 2, 2001) was a Filipino American film and television actress in the 1960s.

== Career ==
Born in Manila, Seurat began her Hollywood career as a dancer in Ken Murray's "Blackouts", the popular postwar variety show at the El Capitan Theatre. Though she primarily played Asian characters, Seurat was adept at playing various nationalities; her breakthrough role was as Louisa Escalante, the blind murder victim's sister in John Frankenheimer's The Young Savages (1961).

She was frequently cast on 1960s television shows whose production staff sought performers for Asian, Hispanic, or Native American roles, including in Adventures in Paradise, The Fugitive, The Alfred Hitchcock Hour, Seaway, Hawaiian Eye, The Virginian, Maverick, Bonanza, Stoney Burke, Star Trek, Voyage to the Bottom of the Sea, The Wild Wild West, Hawaii Five-O, The F.B.I., I Spy, The Lieutenant, The Man from U.N.C.L.E., Rawhide, Ben Casey, and Mannix.

== Personal life ==
In 1959, Seurat married producer Don Devlin. Their son, Dean Devlin, would later become a prominent producer and screenwriter. The couple divorced in 1963. In 1970, she married writer Don Cerveris and retired from acting, adopting the name Pilar Cerveris. This marriage ended in 1981.

Seurat’s father, Major Al Hernandez, was a Filipino-American who fought against Japanese occupiers in the Philippine jungle during World War II. He later authored a book titled “Bahala na,” recounting his wartime experiences. Pilar had a sister, Angela Hernandez, who lived in the Philippines, and a younger half-sister, Alana Lambros, a television producer in Los Angeles.

== Death ==
Seurat died of lung cancer on June 2, 2001, at the age of 62, in Los Angeles. She is interred at Forest Lawn Memorial Park Cemetery. The 2002 comedy-horror film Eight Legged Freaks, produced by her son, was dedicated to her memory.

== Filmography ==
=== Film ===
Year	Title	Role
1961	The Young Savages	Louisa Escalante
1961	Battle at Bloody Beach	Camota
1961	Seven Women from Hell	Mai-Lu Ferguson

=== Television ===
Year	Title	Role	Notes
1959–1962	Adventures in Paradise	Tehura / Midge / Queen Victoria	Appeared in three episodes: "The Forbidden Sea," "The Big Surf," and "Blueprint for Paradise"
1960	Maverick	Pilar	Episode: "The Forbidden City"
1961	Ben Casey	Li Herrick	Episode: "A Certain Time, a Certain Darkness"
1962	Stoney Burke	Margo Tecas	Episode: "Point of Honor"
1963	The Alfred Hitchcock Hour	Mickey Arthur	Episode: "You'll Be the Death of Me"
1963	The Fugitive	Elena Morales	Episode: "Wine Is a Traitor"
1964	The Lieutenant	Lt. Manisahn Joraka	Episode: "To Set It Right"
1965	I Spy	Catherine	Episode: "Dragon's Teeth"
1965	The Wild Wild West	Princess Ching Ling	Episode: "The Night the Dragon Screamed"
1965–1970	The F.B.I.	Maria Montoya / Maria Sandoval / Anita Nieves	Appeared in five episodes portraying different characters
1966	Star Trek	Sybo	Episode: "Wolf in the Fold"
1966	The Man from U.N.C.L.E.	Amra Palli	Episode: "The Indian Affairs Affair"
1966	Voyage to the Bottom of the Sea	Moana	Episode: "The Silent Saboteurs"
1966–1968	The Virginian	Hapamawa / Tela	Appeared in two episodes: "Long Ride to Wind River" and "Nora"
1967	The High Chaparral	Pilar Castaneda	Episode: "The Terrorist"
1967	Custer	Red Moon Woman	Episode: "Spirit Woman"
1969	Mannix	Miriam Valera	Episode: "A Penny for the Peep Show"
1970	Hawaii Five-O	Theresa Dietrich	Episode: "Nightmare Road"
