= The Plot (novel) =

2021 novel by Jean Hanff Korelitz

- First edition
- Author: Jean Hanff Korelitz
- Cover artist: Anne Twomey
- Language: English
- Series: The Book Series
- Release number: 1
- Genre: Thriller; Mystery
- Publisher: Celadon Books
- Publication date: 2021
- Publication place: United States
- Media type: Print (hardcover)
- Pages: 336
- ISBN: 978-1-250-79076-7
- Dewey Decimal: 813.54
- LC Class: PS3561.O6568
- Followed by: The Sequel
- Website: https://www.jeanhanffkorelitz.com/the-plot

The Plot: A Novel is a work of fiction written by Jean Hanff Korelitz. The book was published in May 2021 by Celadon Books. The story is a mystery-thriller.

== Plot ==
Writer Jacob Finch Bonner considers himself a has-been, having been unable to produce anything fruitful after his reasonably successful debut novel. He has become a professor in a shabby Vermont Master of Fine Arts (MFA) program. An obnoxious student of his, Evan Parker, brags that he has devised a novel that will be a guaranteed commercial success. When Evan reveals the plot to Bonner and shares his preliminary work, Bonner recognizes that the idea is indeed superb. Years later, Bonner has fallen on even harder times, taking on two additional jobs after his salary was reduced when the MFA program went online-only. He wonders why he hasn't heard about Evan's book being published. Searching online, he learns that Evan died of a drug overdose just a few months after they last spoke, presumably leaving the book unfinished.

Three years later, Bonner's novel Crib, based on Evan's outline, has sold over two million copies. The plot of Crib is revealed gradually through excerpts: When the very bright 15-year-old Samantha becomes pregnant, her religious parents forbid her to have an abortion or put the child up for adoption. Samantha drops out of school to raise her daughter, Maria, and is embittered over her fate. Samantha's parents eventually die, and her disinterested parenting leads Maria to become highly independent. Maria is a lesbian and she dates a girl named Gab. Maria's teacher informs Samantha that Maria will graduate from high school a year early and that she has already earned an academic scholarship to college. Samantha is frustrated that Maria continues to keep it a secret from her. Maria finally only tells her because she needs to ask to borrow Samantha's car to relocate to Ohio State University. During a violent argument, Samantha impulsively kills Maria. She buries Maria near a remote cabin, and she takes Maria's place at Ohio State. When Gab comes looking for Maria, Samantha murders her.

While promoting Crib and its upcoming film adaptation, Bonner meets a radio producer, Anna. They begin a romance and eventually marry. Bonner begins receiving emails that threaten to expose him for stealing the story of Crib, and these threats escalate to public social media posts. Bonner must defend himself to his publisher; even though there is nothing illegal about the way Bonner used Evan's plot, Bonner refuses to admit that he did not conceive the story entirely alone. Bonner's team believes him, and he manages to write a third novel that his publisher accepts. Bonner visits Evan's hometown to investigate the threats. There, he discovers that Evan's story contains many elements of his actual life: his family home, and members of his family—specifically Evan's sister Dianna and her daughter Rose, depicted as Samantha and Maria in Crib. Bonner initially suspects Rose, as Dianna is dead; he then surmises that Dianna is the culprit, truly having murdered and replaced Rose.

Bonner returns home to Anna. She serves him dinner as he tells her all that has happened and what he has learned. As he becomes groggy and disoriented, Anna reveals that she is Dianna Parker and indeed sent the threats. She resented her family all her life, after her parents forced her to keep her child while Evan impregnated multiple women with impunity. She murdered her parents, and then Rose when the girl suddenly announced her departure after a childhood of indifference to Dianna. When Evan, who believed Dianna was dead, sought out Rose so he could sell the family home, he discovered what Dianna had done. She was suspicious when he did not contact police, and she learned he was writing the novel. She murdered him with his own drugs. Then, discovering that Bonner had published his version of the plot, she resolved to marry him and then murder him to reclaim the story. He has already consumed the fatal dose of poison she put in his meal.

Bonner's death is presumed to be suicide due to depression triggered by baseless accusations of plagiarism. Anna promotes his legacy as well as his third novel, and she enjoys the financial proceeds of his work.

== Reception ==
This novel has been well received. Elizabeth Egan of the New York Times says: "...I will say that I think 'The Plot' is [Korelitz's] gutsiest, most consequential book yet. It keeps you guessing and wondering, and also keeps you thinking...[the] weighty questions mingle with a love story, a mystery and a striver's journey — three of the most satisfying flavors of fiction out there." Maureen Corrigan of The Washington Post writes: "The plot of The Plot is so ingenious that it should be assigned as required reading in the very MFA programs it pinions, both as a model of superior narrative construction and as a warning of the grim realities of the literary life to naïve wannabe writers." Tom Nolan of The Wall Street Journal writes: "Ms. Korelitz's book deftly intersperses chapters from 'Crib,' and it becomes a struggle for Jake to separate his own fiction from the real-life events he believes inspired Evan's tale. "The Plot" is wickedly funny and chillingly grim, and like the novel Evan hoped to create, it deserves to garner all the brass rings.

Judith Reveal, reviewing for the New York Journal of Books, writes: "Korelitz tends to write heavy in narrative with an abundance of parenthetical asides.... she lays out a strong story without distractions.... To say the end of the story is a real twist would be a huge understatement..."

In Bethanne Patrick's review of the novel for NPR, she claims one of the most enjoyable things in the novel "is the [early] encounter between Jacob Finch Bonner and his student Evan Parker...white male writers [who] have brief literary fistcuffs during a class..." However, Patrick later writes, "It might be, from a writer of Korelitz's talent, that I wanted and expected a more fiendish and psychologically driven book. Instead, this 'Plot' falls flat."

== Adaptation ==
In January 2022, Onyx Collective won a bidding war for rights to a TV series adapted by showrunner Abby Ajayi based on the novel, planning to release it on Hulu. HBO was said to be a contender in the bidding war, but dropped out later. The series stars Mahershala Ali, who also executive produces under his Know Wonder banner alongside Endeavor Content.
