= Henry Darrow =

American actor (1933–2021)

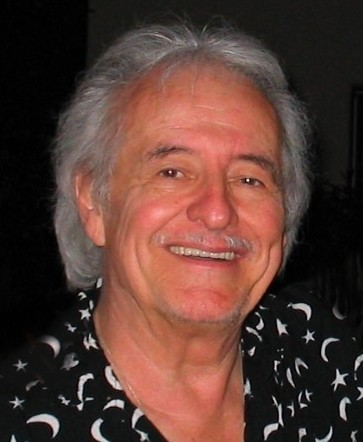
- Born: Enrique Tomás Delgado Jiménez; September 15, 1933; New York City, New York, U.S.
- Died: March 14, 2021 (aged 87); Wilmington, North Carolina, U.S.
- Occupation: Actor
- Years active: 1959–2012
- Spouse: Louise DePuy (m. 1956; div. 1979)
- Children: 2

Henry Darrow (born Enrique Tomás Delgado Jiménez; September 15, 1933 – March 14, 2021) was an American character actor of stage and film known for his role as Manolito "Mano" Montoya on the 1960s television series The High Chaparral. In film, Darrow played the corrupt and vengeful Trooper Hancock in The Hitcher. During the 1970s and 1980s, he was seen in numerous guest-starring television roles. Darrow replaced Efrem Zimbalist Jr. as Zorro's father Don Alejandro de la Vega in the 1990s television series Zorro.

== Early years ==
Darrow's parents had moved from Puerto Rico to New York in the early 1930s. At the age of eight, he played a woodcutter in a school play, an experience which convinced him that his destiny was as an actor.

In 1946, when Darrow was 13, his family returned to Puerto Rico, where he discovered his roots and grew to love the island he had not known. He graduated from Academia del Perpetuo Socorro high school in Miramar, Puerto Rico, as class president before enrolling in the University of Puerto Rico. There he studied political science and acting, and worked as a part-time English-language interpreter. During his third year at the university, he was awarded a scholarship (the first of its kind) to attend acting school. Thereupon Darrow moved to Los Angeles, where he enrolled in the Pasadena Playhouse. He met and married his first wife, Louise whom he referred to as Lucy, and they went on to have two children, Denise and Tom. Darrow graduated with a Bachelor of Arts in theater arts.

== Acting career ==
External audio
- You may watch "Henry Darrow" perform in a clip from the final episode of "High Chaparral" on YouTube

Darrow had already landed small parts in 12 movies and 75 television series when he won the role in a 1965 stage production of The Wonderful Ice Cream Suit. This brought him to the attention of television producer David Dortort, who immediately recruited him for his television western series The High Chaparral, casting him as Manolito Montoya. Making its debut on American television in September 1967 (NBC), it lasted four seasons and was screened around the world. While on the show, both he and series' lead Cameron Mitchell became household names as the breakout stars of the show.

Darrow was the first Latino actor to portray Zorro on television. (José Suárez played Zorro in a 1953 Spanish film.) He starred in the series Zorro and Son and also provided the voice for the animated series of The New Adventures of Zorro. He replaced Efrem Zimbalist, Jr. as Zorro's father from 1990 to 1994 in the Family Channel's successful series The New Zorro.

In 1972, Darrow co-founded the Screen Actors Guild Ethnic Minority Committee with actors Ricardo Montalbán, Edith Diaz and Carmen Zapata.

In 1974-75, Darrow portrayed police detective Manny Quinlan in the first season of Harry O starring David Janssen. The character was killed off at the end of the first season in a retooling of the series.

In 1986, he appeared in the horror film The Hitcher as Trooper Hancock, a ruthless and vengeful policeman who would go above the law to kill the main protagonist (who was framed for the crimes by the main antagonist).

== Later years ==
Darrow was a member of the board of directors of the Screen Actors Guild (SAG) and a member of SAG's Ethnic Minorities Committee. He was also a founder of Nosotros, an organization helping Latino actors land non-stereotyped parts. Darrow served on the Advisory Committee of Bilingual Children's Television. In his later years, Darrow had cut back on his public appearances.

== Death ==
Darrow died of natural causes on March 14, 2021, at the age of 87.

== Filmography ==
=== Film appearance ===
- Curse of the Undead (1959) - Roberto Robles (uncredited)
- Holiday for Lovers (1959) - Station Wagon Driver (uncredited)
- Revenge of the Virgins (1959) - Gunslinger Wade Connor
- The 3rd Voice (1960) - Hotel Papacio Clerk (uncredited)
- Cage of Evil (1960) - 2nd Mexican Policeman (uncredited)
- Sniper's Ridge (1961) - Pvt. Tonto
- Man-Trap (1961) - 1st Mexican Policeman (uncredited)
- Summer and Smoke (1961) - Drunk on Porch (uncredited)
- The Glass Cage (1964) - Police Lab Man
- The Dream of Hamish Mose (1969) - Mex
- Cancel My Reservation (1972) - Joe Little Cloud
- Brock's Last Case (1973, TV Movie) - Arthur Goldencorn
- Badge 373 (1973) - Sweet William
- Aloha Means Goodbye (1974, TV Movie) - Dr. David Kalani
- Exit Dying (1976, TV Movie)
- Halloween with the New Addams Family (1977, TV Movie) - Pancho Addams
- Computer Wizard (1977)
- Where's Willie? (1978) - Sheriff Charlie Wade
- Walk Proud (1979) - Mike Serrano
- A Life of Sin (1979)
- Attica (1980, TV Movie) - Herman Badillo
- Beyond the Universe (1981) - Coblenz
- St. Helens (1981) - Lloyd Wagner
- Birds of Paradise (1981) - Mario, 'The Jackal'
- Rooster (1982, TV Movie) - Dr. Sanchez
- Losin' It (1983) - Sheriff
- The Hitcher (1986) - Trooper Hancock
- Mission to Kill (1986) - Senor Borghini
- Death Blow (1987) - Chief Medina
- In Dangerous Company (1988) - Alex Aguilar
- L.A. Bounty (1989) - Lt. Chandler
- Blue Heat (1990) - Captain Joe Torres
- Percy and Thunder (1993, TV Movie) - Manuel Valencia
- Maverick (1994) - Riverboat Poker Player #4
- Criminal Passion (1994) - Captain Ramoz
- The Fight in the Fields (1999) - Doc
- Tequila Body Shots (1999) - Doctor
- Runaway Jury (2003) - Sebald
- The Writer's Pub (2005, Short) - Old Timer
- Angels with Angles (2005) - Raul
- A Girl Like Me: The Gwen Araujo Story (2006, TV Movie) - Papi
- Primo (2008) - Dr. Vasquez
- From Bubba with Love (2009)
- Soda Springs (2012) - El Quijano

=== Television appearance ===
Darrow also appeared in hundreds of episodes of soap operas, miniseries, sitcoms and dramas, along with numerous stage plays. Television series in which he has appeared include:

- Wagon Train (1959) - Benito DeVarga (credited as Henry Delgado)
- Stoney Burke (1963) - Mexican Border Policeman
- T.H.E. Cat (1966-1967) - Gregory Tyrole / Cosmo Pumbol
- Gunsmoke (1966-1967) - Ross Segurra / Oro
- The Wild Wild West (1967) - Archduke Maurice
- Bonanza (1967) - Amigo
- The High Chaparral (1967-1971) - Manolito Montoya
- Daniel Boone (1967) - Gideon
- The Big Valley (1969)
- Top of the Pops (1970) - guest on February 26 edition
- Mission: Impossible (1971) - Gregory Tolan
- Night Gallery (1971) - Dr. Juan Munos (segment "Cool Air")
- Bearcats! (1971) - Raoul Estaban - 2 episodes
- Hawaii Five-O (1971-1977) - Stewart Longworth / Billy Madrid / Johnny Oporta
- The Mod Squad (1972) - Israel Rivera
- Kung Fu (1973) - Don Emilio Fierro
- Kojak (1974) - Kevin Le Jeune
- Harry O (1974-1975) - Lt. Manuel 'Manny' Quinlan
- The Invisible Man (1975) - Dr. Nick Maggio
- McMillan and Wife (1975) - Inspector Jacques Arnaud
- The Streets of San Francisco (1976) - Ramon Montoya
- Sara (1976) - Angelo
- Baretta (1976) - Delgado
- The Six Million Dollar Man (1976) - Byron Falco
- Quincy, M.E. (1976-1982) - Dr. Tony Avila / Dr. Edward Herrera / Dr. Rivera
- Wonder Woman (1977) - David Allen / Walter Lampkin
- Halloween with the New Addams Family (1977) Pancho Addams (Gomez's Brother)
- Centennial (1978) - Alvarez
- The Waltons (1979) - Barry Stone
- The Incredible Hulk (1981) - Patrero
- Simon & Simon (1981-1988) - Alejandro Agilar / Manuel Fernandez
- The New Adventures of Zorro (1981) - Don Diego / Zorro (voice)
- Seguin (1982) - Don Erasmo
- T.J. Hooker (1982–1986) - Gus Kalioki / Miguel Gomez / Dr. Frank Martinez
- Born to the Wild (1982) - Lost Robe
- Benson (1982) - Generalissimo
- Zorro and Son (1983) - Don Diego de la Vega
- Tales of the Gold Monkey (1983) - The Magistrate
- Jennifer Slept Here (1983) - Enrique
- Airwolf (1984) - Philip Maurice
- Magnum, P.I. (1985) - Will Kenikowa
- Fresno (1986 miniseries) - Commandante
- Knight Rider (1986) - Roderigo DeLorca
- Star Trek: The Next Generation (1988, Episode: "Conspiracy") - Adm. Savar
- The Golden Girls (1988) - Fidel Santiago
- Zorro (1990-1993) - Don Alejandro de la Vega
- Time Trax (1993) - The Chief
- Star Trek: Voyager (1995-1996) - Kolopak
- Babylon 5 (1997) - Dr. William Indiri

Soap opera performances include:

- General Hospital - Ambassador Tabris (1982) / DVX-backed Colonel (1987)
- Dynasty - (1982) - Ramon
- Dallas (1983) - Garcia
- One Life to Live (1987) - Dante Medina
- Santa Barbara (1989-1992) - Rafael Castillo
- The Bold and the Beautiful (1998-2001) - Dr. Carlos Nunez

== Music videos ==
In 1982, Darrow appeared as the prize wheel spinner in the music video for Santana's "Hold On", which was released as the lead single from their album Shangó. It was directed by John Mark Robinson.

== Awards ==
- A Bambi Award, Germany's equivalent of the Emmys, for The High Chaparral.
- An Emmy for his role in the soap opera Santa Barbara.
- The Ricardo Montalbán/Nosotros Award. Darrow was the inaugural winner of the award for his contributions in improving Latinos image.
- The ALMA Awards Ricardo Montalbán Lifetime Achievement Award in 2012.
- The Miller Brewing Company honored Darrow by portraying him in its 2000 Hispanic-American Calendar.

== See also ==
- List of Puerto Ricans
