= George Holmes (actor) =

American actor (1918–1985)

- Publicity Photo of George Holmes
- Born: George Holmes; November 25, 1918; Shamokin, Pennsylvania, U.S.
- Died: February 19, 1985 (aged 66); Los Angeles, California, U.S.
- Occupation: Actor
- Years active: 1937-1983

George Holmes (November 25, 1918 - February 19, 1985) was an American film and television actor.

== Career ==
Holmes started his acting career in the 1930s, when at the time he was an ice skater appearing at first in films like Thin Ice and Second Fiddle. After that, he finally got a contract with the studio. He subsequently appeared in films like It Happened in Flatbush and The Falcon in San Francisco. But Holmes didn't like to deliver dialogues and the studio eventually fired him. Holmes then started to appear in acting wrestling matches to help his income.

In the 1950s, Holmes career started to decline, with his last important credited role in an episode of the TV series The Life and Legend of Wyatt Earp. Then Holmes appeared in many television shows and movies during the 1960s and 1970s, some of them were, Johnny Staccato, Bourbon Street, The Lost World, From the Terrace, Death Valley Days, Save the Tiger and The Rockford Files among others.

During the 1980s, the appearances of Holmes began to wane and shortly after he retired, being the last of them in films and TV series like Stripes, The Star Chamber, Simon & Simon and The Greatest American Hero.

== Filmography ==
=== Film ===
- Thin Ice (1937) - uncredited
- Second Fiddle (1939) - Minor Role (uncredited)
- It Happened in Flatbush (1942) - Roy Collins aka Roy Anderson
- Ten Gentlemen from West Point (1942) - Cadet (uncredited)
- Thru Different Eyes (1942) - Harry Beach
- Footlight Serenade (1942) - Bill - Movie Cowboy (uncredited)
- The Man in the Trunk (1942) - Dick Burke
- Life Begins at Eight-Thirty (1942) - Jerry in 'John's Fourth Wife' (uncredited)
- Crash Dive (1943) - Crew Member (uncredited)
- Guadalcanal Diary (1943) - Marine (uncredited)
- Roger Touhy, Gangster (1944) - McNair (uncredited)
- Those Endearing Young Charms (1945) - Pilot (uncredited)
- The Falcon in San Francisco (1945) - Dalman
- It Shouldn't Happen to a Dog (1946)
- The Spiral Staircase (1946) - The Killer's 'Shadow' (uncredited)
- Little Giant (1946) - Hercules - Male Model (uncredited)
- The Falcon's Alibi (1946) - Racing Fan (uncredited)
- Bedlam (1946) - 2nd Stonemason (uncredited)
- Dark Alibi (1946) - Hugh Kenzie
- Genius at Work (1946) - Reporter (uncredited)
- Song of Scheherazade (1947) - Midshipman (uncredited)
- Back Trail (1948) - Rocky
- Bride of Vengeance (1949) - Troop Captain (uncredited)
- When Worlds Collide (1951) - Workman (uncredited)
- Boots Malone (1952) - Reed (uncredited)
- The Lost World (1960) - Guest at Zoological Institute Forum (uncredited)
- From the Terrace (1960) - Party Guest (uncredited)
- The Facts of Life (1960) - Party Guest (uncredited)
- Cinderfella (1960) - Ball Guest (uncredited)
- Go Naked in the World (1961) - Party Guest (uncredited)
- Return to Peyton Place (1961) - Townsman (uncredited)
- By Love Possessed (1961) - Club Patron (uncredited)
- The Honeymoon Machine (1961) - Casino Patron (uncredited)
- The Comancheros (1961) - Casino Patron (uncredited)
- Susan Slade (1961) - Party Guest (uncredited)
- The Errand Boy (1961) - Premiere Attendee (uncredited)
- The Children's Hour (1961) - Mourner (uncredited)
- Sweet Bird of Youth (1962) - Cameraman (uncredited)
- All Fall Down (1962) - Bowling Alley Patron (uncredited)
- Cape Fear (1962) - Attorney (uncredited)
- The Notorious Landlady (1962) - Bailiff (uncredited)
- Boys' Night Out (1962) - Bar Patron (uncredited)
- Hemingway's Adventures of a Young Man (1962) - Reporter (uncredited)
- The Manchurian Candidate (1962) - Campaign Worker (uncredited)
- Critic's Choice (1963) - Spectator (uncredited)
- My Six Loves (1963) - Man at Auction (uncredited)
- A Ticklish Affair (1963) - Restaurant Patron (uncredited)
- The Caretakers (1963) - Theater Patron (uncredited)
- Johnny Cool (1963) - Commuter (uncredited)
- Wall of Noise (1963) - Restaurant Patron (uncredited)
- The Wheeler Dealers (1963) - Restaurant Patron (uncredited)
- 4 for Texas (1963) - Restaurant Patron (uncredited)
- The Incredible Mr. Limpet (1964) - Scientist (uncredited)
- Viva Las Vegas (1964) - Casino Patron (uncredited)
- The Unsinkable Molly Brown (1964) - Party Guest (uncredited)
- Fate Is the Hunter (1964) - Board Member (uncredited)
- My Fair Lady (1964) - Ball Guest (uncredited)
- Where Love Has Gone (1964) - Airport Patron (uncredited)
- Youngblood Hawke (1964) - Party Guest (uncredited)
- Sex and the Single Girl (1964) - Nightclub Patron (uncredited)
- How to Murder Your Wife (1965) - Club Member (uncredited)
- Strange Bedfellows (1965) - Townsman (uncredited)
- Harlow (1965) - Party Guest (uncredited)
- Harlow (1965) - Actor at Central Casting (uncredited)
- The Great Race (1965) - Reporter (uncredited)
- The Third Day (1965) - Bar Customer (uncredited)
- The Cincinnati Kid (1965) - Poker Game Spectator (uncredited)
- Do Not Disturb (1965) - Board Member (uncredited)
- The Chase (1966) - Townsman (uncredited)
- Lord Love a Duck (1966) - Observer (uncredited)
- The Oscar (1966) - Academy Awards Guest (uncredited)
- Three on a Couch (1966) - Waiter (uncredited)
- Gunpoint (1966) - Guard (uncredited)
- Batman (1966) - Club Patron (uncredited)
- Chamber of Horrors (1966) - Train Passenger (uncredited)
- Way...Way Out (1966) - Reporter (uncredited)
- Not with My Wife, You Don't! (1966) - Party Guest (uncredited)
- The Adventures of Bullwhip Griffin (1967) - Townsman (uncredited)
- How to Succeed in Business Without Really Trying (1967) - Party Guest (uncredited)
- Caprice (1967) - Crew Member (uncredited)
- The Power (1968) - Party Guest (uncredited)
- The Boston Strangler (1968) - Clerk (uncredited)
- Live a Little, Love a Little (1968) - Party Guest (uncredited)
- The Horse in the Gray Flannel Suit (1968) - Executive (uncredited)
- The Love Bug (1968) - Official (uncredited)
- Pendulum (1969) - Pedestrian (uncredited)
- Hook, Line & Sinker (1969) - Burial Spectator (uncredited)
- The Love God? (1969) - Onlooker (uncredited)
- Once You Kiss a Stranger (1969) - Official (uncredited)
- The Computer Wore Tennis Shoes (1969) - Audience Member (uncredited)
- WUSA (1970) - Restaurant Patron (uncredited)
- The Million Dollar Duck (1971) - Attorney (uncredited)
- What's Up, Doc? (1972) - Waiter (uncredited)
- The War Between Men and Women (1972) - Passenger (uncredited)
- The Poseidon Adventure (1972) - Passenger (uncredited)
- Save the Tiger (1973) - Bar Patron (uncredited)
- Cleopatra Jones (1973) - Minor Role (uncredited)
- The Sting (1973) - Gambler (uncredited)
- Blazing Saddles (1974) - Theatre Patron (uncredited)
- Mame (1974) - Clerk (uncredited)
- The Terminal Man (1974) - Reporter (uncredited)
- The Godfather Part II (1974) - Senate Hearing Spectator (uncredited)
- Young Frankenstein (1974) - Theatre Goer (uncredited)
- The Strongest Man in the World (1975) - Crumply Crunch Executive (uncredited)
- Shampoo (1975) - Party Guest (uncredited)
- At Long Last Love (1975) - Racetrack Patron (uncredited)
- The Day of the Locust (1975) - Attendant (uncredited)
- Doc Savage: The Man of Bronze (1975) - Judge (uncredited)
- The Hindenburg (1975) - Passenger (uncredited)
- The Lindbergh Kidnapping Case (1976) - Trial Spectator (uncredited)
- Won Ton Ton, the Dog Who Saved Hollywood (1976) - Usher (uncredited)
- Silent Movie (1976) - Audience Member (uncredited)
- The Shaggy D.A. (1976) - Pedestrian (uncredited)
- Billy Jack Goes to Washington (1977) - Senator (uncredited)
- New York, New York (1977) - Party Guest (uncredited)
- Big Wednesday (1978) - Wedding Guest (uncredited)
- The Swarm (1978) - Military Officer (uncredited)
- Born Again (1978) - Official (uncredited)
- Promises in the Dark (1979) - Executive (uncredited)
- Little Miss Marker (1980) - Elevator Passenger (uncredited)
- The Blues Brothers (1980) - Restaurant Patron (uncredited)
- Stripes (1981) - Driver (uncredited)
- The Star Chamber (1983) - Reception Guest (uncredited)

=== Television ===
- The Life and Legend of Wyatt Earp - Wyatt's Love Affair (1956) TV Episode .... Mr. Discoll
- Johnny Staccato - The List of Death (1960) TV Episode .... Club Patron (uncredited)
- Bourbon Street Beat - The 10% Blues (1960) TV Episode .... Bartender (uncredited)
- Johnny Midnight - The Whammy (1960) TV Episode .... Plane Passenger (uncredited)
- The Barbara Stanwyck Show - The Miraculous Journey of Tadpole Chan (1960) TV Episode .... Clerk (uncredited)
- The Untouchables - Star Witness (1960) TV Episode .... Trial Spectator (uncredited) - Little Egypt (1960) TV Episode .... Diner Patron (uncredited) - Kiss of Death Girl (1960) TV Episode .... Casino Patron (uncredited)
- The Law and Mr. Jones - A Very Special Citizen (1961) TV Episode .... Juror (uncredited)
- Coronado 9 - They Met in Honolulu (1961) TV Episode .... Wedding Guest (uncredited)
- The Dick Powell Show - A Time to Die (1962) TV Episode .... Nightclub Patron (uncredited)
- The Twilight Zone - Cavender Is Coming (1962) TV Episode .... Party Guest (uncredited)
- Stoney Burke - Point of Honor (1962) TV Episode .... Bar Patron (uncredited)
- The Donna Reed Show - My Dad (1962) TV Episode .... Golfer (uncredited)
- Cheyenne - The Vanishing Breed (1962) TV Episode .... Senator (uncredited)
- The Loretta Young Show - Romance for Everyone (1962) TV Episode .... Commuter (uncredited)
- Sam Benedict - The Bird of Warning (1962) TV Episode .... Juror (uncredited) - Not Even the Gulls Shall Weep (1963) TV Episode .... Guard (uncredited)
- The Andy Griffith Show - Class Reunion (1963) TV Episode .... Reunion Guest (uncredited)
- Route 66 - Suppose I Said I Was the Queen of Spain (1963) TV Episode .... Detective (uncredited)
- Mister Ed - Ed the Zebra (1963) TV Episode .... Man at Pool (uncredited)
- Death Valley Days - The Salt War (1961) TV Episode .... Frank - Diamond Jim Brady (1963) TV Episode .... Waiter (uncredited)
- The Dakotas - Mutiny at Fort Mercy (1963) TV Episode .... Prisoner (uncredited) - The Chooser of the Slain (1963) TV Episode .... Town Council Member (uncredited)
- Mr. Novak - The Risk (1963) TV Episode .... Faculty Member (uncredited)
- Arrest and Trial - Isn't It a Lovely View? (1963) TV Episode .... Bailiff (uncredited) - The Quality of Justice (1963) TV Episode .... Scientist (uncredited)
- Rawhide - Incident of the Swindler (1964) TV Episode .... Saloon Patron (uncredited)
- Twelve O'Clock High - The Climate of Doubt (1964) TV Episode .... Judge (uncredited)
- My Favorite Martian - Double Trouble (1964) TV Episode .... Club Patron (uncredited)
- Burke's Law - Who Killed the Kind Doctor? (1963) TV Episode .... Club Patron (uncredited) - Who Killed the Tall One in the Middle? (1964) TV Episode .... Club Patron (uncredited)
- The Virginian - A Time Remembered (1963) TV Episode .... Townsman (uncredited) - Two Men Named Laredo (1965) TV Episode .... Trial Spectator (uncredited)
- Kraft Suspense Theatre - One Step Down (1963) TV Episode .... Funeral Guest (uncredited) - Nobody Will Ever Know (1965) TV Episode .... Party Guest (uncredited)
- The Beverly Hillbillies - The Possum Parade (1965) TV Episode .... Rally Spectator (uncredited)
- Voyage to the Bottom of the Sea - Escape from Venice (1965) TV Episode .... Casino Patron (uncredited)
- Gidget - Too Many Cooks (1965) TV Episode .... Party Guest (uncredited)
- The Lucy Show - Lucy and Art Linkletter (1966) TV Episode .... Audience Member (uncredited)
- The Dick Van Dyke Show - Bad Reception in Albany (1966) TV Episode .... Minister (uncredited)
- The Wild Wild West - The Night of the Burning Diamond (1966) TV Episode .... Gallery Patron (uncredited)
- The Munsters - Herman's Lawsuit (1966) TV Episode .... Crew Member (uncredited)
- Run for Your Life - The Day Time Stopped (1966) TV Episode .... Restaurant Patron (uncredited)
- Occasional Wife - I Do, We Don't (1966) TV Episode .... Clerk (uncredited)
- That Girl - Rich Little Rich Kid (1966) TV Episode .... Restaurant Patron (uncredited)
- Batman - Hi Diddle Riddle (1966) TV Episode .... Guest (uncredited) - An Egg Grows in Gotham (1966) TV Episode .... Tour Group Member (uncredited)
- Mission: Impossible - Odds on Evil (1966) TV Episode .... Casino Patron (uncredited) - The Short Tail Spy (1966) TV Episode .... Party Guest (uncredited)
- I Spy - Philotimo (1967) TV Episode .... Party Guest (uncredited)
- The Man from U.N.C.L.E. - The Fiddlesticks Affair (1965) TV Episode .... Casino Patron (uncredited) - The Yellow Scarf Affair (1965) TV Episode .... Hotel Guest (uncredited) - Alexander the Greater Affair: Part One (1965) TV Episode .... Party Guest (uncredited) - The Napoleon's Tomb Affair (1967) TV Episode .... Restaurant Patron (uncredited) - The TRUSH Roulette Affair (1967) TV Episode .... Dealer (uncredited) - The Seven Wonders of the World Affair: Part I (1968) TV Episode .... Reporter (uncredited)
- It Takes a Thief - It Takes One to Know One (1968) TV Episode .... Casino Patron (uncredited)
- Judd, for the Defense - The Devil's Surrogate (1968) TV Episode .... Courtroom Spectator (uncredited)
- Get Smart - The Dead Spy Scrawls (1966) TV Episode .... Man in the Pool Parlor (uncredited) - Operation Ridiculous (1968) TV Episode .... Elevator Passenger (uncredited)
- Family Affair - A Waltz from Vienna (1968) TV Episode .... Guest (uncredited)
- My Three Sons - Wedding Bells (1967) TV Episode .... Wedding Guest (uncredited) - Uncle Charley's Aunt (1968) TV Episode .... Audience Member (uncredited) - What Did You Do Today, Grandpa? (1969) TV Episode .... Party Guest (uncredited)
- Dragnet - The Brookie (1967) TV Episode .... Legion Member (uncredited) - Narcotics DR-21 (1969) TV Episode .... Businessman (uncredited)
- Ironside - Puzzlelock (1969) TV Episode .... Maitre d' (uncredited)
- The Brady Bunch - The Honeymoon (1969) TV Episode .... Wedding Guest (uncredited)
- The Young Lawyers - The Young Lawyers (1969) TV Episode .... Lawyer (uncredited)
- I Dream of Jeannie - Here Coomes Bootsie Nightingale (1967) TV Episode .... Party Guest (uncredited) - Jeannie, the Matchmaker (1969) TV Episode .... Maitrie D' (uncredited)
- Bewitched - It Takes One to Know One (1964) TV Episode .... Restaurant Patron (uncredited) - Man of the Year (1968) TV Episode .... Party Guest (uncredited) - The Phrase Is Familiar (1970) TV Episode .... Elevator Passenger (uncredited)
- Hogan's Heroes - Hogan's Double Life (1971) TV Episode .... Party Guest (uncredited)
- McCloud - A Little Plot at Tranquil Valley (1972) TV Episode .... Tour Group Member (uncredited)
- McMillan & Wife - Death Is a Seven Point Favorite (1971) TV Episode .... Pedestrian (uncredited) - Cop of the Year (1972) TV Episode .... Restaurant Patron (uncredited) - No Hearts, No Flowers (1973) .... Pedestrian (uncredited)
- Search - Numbered for Death (1973) TV Episode .... Doorman (uncredited)
- Bridget Loves Bernie - The Information Gap (1973) TV Episode .... Party Guest (uncredited)
- The Partridge Family - But the Memory Lingers On (1970) TV Episode .... Hotel Doorman (uncredited) - Did You Hear the One About Danny Partridge? (1970) TV Episode .... Audience Member (uncredited) - Princess and the Partridge (1972) TV Episode .... Official (uncredited) - Hate Thy Neighbor (1973) TV Episode .... Audience Member (uncredited)
- The Magician - Pilot (1973) TV Episode .... Waiter (uncredited) - The Manhunters (1973) TV Episode .... Casino Patron (uncredited)
- Shaft - The Killing (1973) TV Episode .... Juror (uncredited)
- Here's Lucy - The Big Game (1973) TV Episode .... Fan (uncredited) - The Carters Meets Frankie Avalon (1973) TV Episode .... Audience Member (uncredited)
- Banacek - No Stone Unturned (1973) TV Episode .... Party Guest (uncredited) - The Three Million Dollar Piracy (1973) TV Episode .... Restaurant Patron (uncredited)
- Police Story - The Gamble (1974) TV Episode .... Casino Patron (uncredited)
- Columbo - Death Lends a Hand (1971) TV Episode .... Doctor (uncredited) - Requiem for a Falling Star (1973) TV Episode .... Restaurant Patron (uncredited) - A Stitch in Crime (1973) TV Episode .... Party Guest (uncredited) - The Most Dangerous Match (1973) TV Episode .... Diner Patron (uncredited) - Any Old Port in a Storm (1973) TV Episode .... Plane Passenger (uncredited) - Candidate for Crime (1973) TV Episode .... Detective (uncredited) - Double Exposure (1973) TV Episode .... Executive (uncredited) - An Exercise in Fatality (1974) TV Episode .... Gym Member (uncredited)
- Rhoda - The Honeymoon (1974) TV Episode .... Passenger (uncredited)
- The Rockford Files - Just by Accident (1975) TV Episode .... Man at Elevator (uncredited)
- Kolchak: The Night Stalker - The Sentry (1975) TV Episode .... Worker (uncredited)
- Barbary Coast - Arson and Old Lace (1975) TV Episode .... Bartender (uncredited)
- The Rookies - The Code Five Affair (1975) TV Episode .... Bartender (uncredited)
- Kojak - Requiem for a Cop (1973) TV Episode .... Police Officer (uncredited) - The Corrupter (1973) TV Episode .... Detective (uncredited) - Conspiracy of Fear (1973) TV Episode .... Party Guest (uncredited) - The Best Judge Money Can Buy (1974) TV Episode .... Funeral Guest (uncredited) - The Nicest Guys on the Block (1975) TV Episode .... Party Guest (uncredited) - A Grave Too Soon (1976) TV Episode ..... Detective (uncredited)
- Police Woman - Double Image (1976) TV Episode .... Pedestrian (uncredited)
- Ellery Queen - The Adventure of the Two-Faced Woman (1976) TV Episode .... Auction Guest (uncredited)
- Starsky & Hutch - Bloodbath (1977) TV Episode .... Courthouse Spectator (uncredited) - The Set-Up: Part 1 (1977) TV Episode .... Banker (uncredited) - Survival (1977) TV Episode .... Bartender (uncredited)
- The Hardy Boys/Nancy Drew Mysteries - Nancy Drew's Love Match (1977) TV Episode .... Bellboy (uncredited) - The Lady on Thursday at Ten (1978) TV Episode .... Official (uncredited)
- Lou Grant - Cophouse (1977) TV Episode .... Banquet Guest (uncredited) - Airliner (1978) TV Episode .... Commuter (uncredited) - Renewal (1978) TV Episode .... Gallery Patron (uncredited)
- Charlie's Angels - Angel Trap (1977) TV Episode .... Man in Park (uncredited) - The Vegas Connection (1977) TV Episode .... Casino Patron (uncredited) - Antique Angels (1978) TV Episode .... Car Owner (uncredited) - Angel on High (1978) TV Episode .... Townsman (uncredited) - Winning Is for Losers (1978) TV Episode .... Waiter (uncredited)
- Roots: The Next Generations - Part II (1896-1897) (1979) TV Episode .... Townsman (uncredited)
- The Love Boat - Message for Maureen/Gotcha/Acapulco Connection (1977) TV Episode .... Passenger (uncredited) - The Captain's Captain/Romance Roulette/Hounded (A Dog's Life) (1977) TV Episode .... Passenger (uncredited) - The Minister and the Stripper/Her Own Two Feet/Tony's Family (1978) TV Episode .... Chef (uncredited) - The Grass Is Always Greener/Three Stages of Love/Oldies But Goodies (1979) TV Episode .... Passenger (uncredited)
- Hart to Hart - Murder Wrap (1981) TV Episode .... Exhibit Guest (uncredited) - Murder Is a Drag (1981) TV Episode .... Opera Guest (uncredited)
- Dynasty - Blake Goes to Jail (1981) TV Episode .... Courtroom Spectator (uncredited) - Enter Alexis (1981) TV Episode .... Courtroom Spectator (uncredited) - Sammy Jo and Steven Marry (1982) TV Episode .... Waiter (uncredited)
- Quincy, M.E. - ...The Thigh Bone's Connected to the Knee Bone (1977) TV Episode .... Faculty Member (uncredited) - Across the Line (1982) TV Episode .... Board Member (uncredited)
- Simon & Simon - Shadow of Sam Penny (1983) TV Episode .... Retirement Home Resident (uncredited)
- The Greatest American Hero - Desperado (1983) TV Episode .... Official (uncredited)
