= Robert Dowdell =

American actor

- Born: March 10, 1932; Park Ridge, Illinois, U.S.
- Died: January 23, 2018 (aged 85); Coldwater, Michigan, U.S.
- Education: Wesleyan University; University of Chicago
- Occupation: Actor
- Years active: 1956–1995
- Spouse: Sheila Connolly (m. 1965; div. 1979)

Robert Dowdell (March 10, 1932 – January 23, 2018) was an American actor, best known for his role as Lieutenant Commander Chip Morton in the television series Voyage to the Bottom of the Sea.

== Biography ==
Dowdell was born in Park Ridge, Illinois, a suburb of Chicago, and later graduated Parker High School. He attended Wesleyan University and the University of Chicago, before enlisting in the United States Army Corps of Engineers.

After discharging from the service, Dowdell took an interest in acting. It was suggested that he take lessons with Wynn Handman. He was cast in a play written by Leslie Stevens, who went on to create the Western television series Stoney Burke and encouraged him to audition. Dowdell was cast in the recurring role of Cody Bristol. Following Stoney Burke, Dowdell was cast in Voyage to the Bottom of the Sea, which aired from 1964 to 1968. Over the next 30 years, he continued to act in various stage, film, and television productions before retiring in 1995.

== Personal life ==
Dowdell was married to actress Sheila Connolly from 1965 until their divorce in 1979. He did not have any children.

== Death ==
Dowdell died of natural causes on January 23, 2018, at age 85 in Coldwater, Michigan.

== Filmography ==
=== Film ===
Year	Title	Role	Notes
1970	Macho Callahan	Blind man	
1984	The Initiation	Jason Randall	
1987	Assassination	Capt. Ogilvie - Cappy	
1989	Wicked Stepmother	Judge	
1989	Skin Deep	Traffic Judge	

=== Television ===
Year	Title	Role	Notes
1956	Studio One		Episode: "American Primitive"
1959	Deadline	Beene	Episode: "The Neon Touch"
1960	The Fifth Column		Television film
1960	Buick-Electra Playhouse		Episode: "The Fifth Column"
1960	Moment of Fear		Episode: "The Accomplice"
1962	Surfside 6	Eric Hirsh	Episode: "Masquerade"
1962–1963	Stoney Burke	Cody Bristol	32 episodes
1964–1968	Voyage to the Bottom of the Sea	Lt. Comdr. Chip Morton	109 episodes
1969	Land of the Giants	Policeman	Episode: "Brainwash"
1970	Storefront Lawyers	Philip Evers	Episode: "The Law Can't Touch Him"
1971	City Beneath the Sea	Young Officer	Television film
1971	O'Hara, U.S. Treasury	Maj. Tony Puller USMC	Episode: "O'Hara, U.S. Treasury"
1971	Terror in the Sky	Tower Radar Operator	Television film
1971–1972	Adam-12	Lt. Tom Ashton / Sgt. Wade / Sgt. Prescott	3 episodes
1972	McMillan & Wife	Pilot	Episode: "The Face of Murder"
1972	The F.B.I.	Dan Bransfield	Episode: "Arrangement with Terror"
1975	S.W.A.T.	Peter Sedley	Episode: "Strike Force"
1977	Most Wanted	Dr. Andrews	Episode: "The Ritual Killer"
1979	240-Robert	Dr. Lewis	Episode: "Oil and Water"
1979	Buck Rogers in the 25th Century	Galen	Episode: "Planet of the Slave Girls"
1979	CHiPs	Mr. Adams	Episode: "Second Chance"
1982	Hart to Hart		Episode: "Hart of Diamonds"
1983	Fame	Air Force Major	Episode: "Hail to the Chief"
1984	Masquerade	Captain	Episode: "Caribbean Holiday"
1984	The Master	Senator Clayton	Episode: "Hostages"
1984–1986	Capitol	Sen. Joshua Harrington	3 episodes
1985	V	Visitor Doctor	Episode: "The Betrayal"
1985	Dynasty	Butler	Episode: "The Titans"
1986	Outrage!	District Attorney Curran	Television film
1986	Hotel	Cameron Russell	Episode: "Restless Nights"
1987	Max Headroom	Doctor	Episode: "Body Banks"
1990	Freddy's Nightmares	Victor Hall	Episode: "Funhouse"
1991	Hunter	Motel Manager	Episode: "Under Suspicion"
1995	American Masters	Minister	Episode: "Edgar Allan Poe: Terror of the Soul"
