= Voyage to the Bottom of the Sea =

1961 science fiction film by Irwin Allen

- Theatrical release poster (1 of 4 used)
- Directed by: Irwin Allen
- Written by: Irwin Allen; Charles Bennett
- Produced by: Irwin Allen
- Starring: Walter Pidgeon; Joan Fontaine; Barbara Eden; Peter Lorre; Robert Sterling; Michael Ansara; Frankie Avalon
- Cinematography: Winton Hoch
- Edited by: George Boemler
- Music by: Paul Sawtell and Bert Shefter
- Production company: Windsor Productions
- Distributed by: 20th Century Fox
- Release date: July 12, 1961
- Running time: 105 min.
- Country: United States
- Language: English
- Budget: $1,580,000
- Box office: $7 million (US/Canada)

Voyage to the Bottom of the Sea is a 1961 American science fiction disaster film, produced and directed by Irwin Allen, and starring Walter Pidgeon and Robert Sterling. The supporting cast includes Peter Lorre, Joan Fontaine, Barbara Eden, Michael Ansara, and Frankie Avalon. The film's storyline was written by Irwin Allen and Charles Bennett. The opening title credits theme song was sung by Avalon. The film was distributed by 20th Century Fox.

== Plot ==
A state-of-the-art nuclear submarine, the Seaview, is on diving trials in the Arctic Ocean. Seaview is designed by scientist Admiral Harriman Nelson (USN-Ret). Captain Lee Crane is Seaview's commanding officer. The mission includes being out of radio contact for 96 hours while under the Arctic ice cap. The polar ice begins to crack and melt, with boulder-size pieces sinking into the ocean around the submerged submarine. Surfacing, they discover the sky is on fire. After rescuing scientist Miguel Alvarez and his dog at Ice Floe Delta, Seaview receives a radio message from Mission Director Inspector Bergan at the Bureau of Marine Exploration. While piercing the Van Allen radiation belt, a meteor shower set it on fire, resulting in an increase in the global temperature.

The President summons Admiral Nelson to a United Nations Emergency Scientific meeting. Nelson and Commodore Lucius Emery have devised a plan to end the catastrophe. Seaview arrives in New York Harbor two days later. According to Nelson and Emery's calculations, if the increasing temperature is not stopped, it will become irreversible and the Earth will die in about three weeks. Nelson and Emery propose extinguishing the fire by launching a nuclear missile at the burning belt from the Mariana Islands. A nuclear explosion should extinguish the flames, "amputating" the belt from the Earth. Seaview can fire the missile. The chief scientist and head delegate, Vienna's Emilio Zucco, rejects Nelson's plan as too risky. He believes the composition of the belt's gasses will cause the fire to soon burn itself out. Nelson disagrees with Zucco's theory, claiming that his estimated burn-out point is incorrect. However, Nelson and Emery's plan is rejected. The two leave the proceedings intending to get authorization directly from the President himself.

The Seaview races to reach the optimal firing position above the Pacific Ocean's Mariana Trench in time for the needed angle of trajectory. Nelson and Crane attempt tapping the Rio-to-London telephone cable, trying to reach the President. During the cable tapping attempt, Crane and Alvarez battle a giant squid. They can only tap into the London cable, and Nelson learns there has been no contact with the U.S. for 35 hours.

An unsuccessful attempt on the Admiral's life indicates a saboteur is aboard. Alvarez, a religious zealot regarding the catastrophe, is the suspected saboteur. Dr. Susan Hiller, who privately supports Dr. Zucco's plan, is another suspect.

The Seaview's main generator is then sabotaged by a crew member who lost his mind, forcing Nelson to order Crane to proceed while repairs are made despite the risk of traveling without power for the sonar and radar. As a result, the submarine narrowly escapes a minefield left over from World War II. The crew are near-mutiny, to the point that when the Seaview encounters a motor ship whose crew is dead, Captain Crane and the Admiral allow any men who wish to leave rather than continue the mission to sail the derelict home.

Crane begins doubting the Admiral's tactics and reasoning. A hostile submarine pursues them, diving into the Mariana Trench, exceeding its crush depth; it implodes before it can destroy Seaview.

The saboteur has shut down the sub's power. Crane encounters Dr. Hiller, the saboteur, atop the shark tank, as she exits the restricted nuclear reactor core. Her radiation detector badge has turned red, showing she has been exposed to a fatal dose. When asked why, she says to prevent the sub from reaching its target. An explosion rocks the sub, throwing Dr. Hiller into the shark tank. The sharks kill her.

Seaview reaches the Mariana Islands in time to carry out the Admiral's plan. He learns that temperatures are rising faster than projected, proving Zucco's theory is incorrect. Alvarez, believing it is God's will for the Earth to be destroyed, attempts to sabotage the mission by threatening to explode a bomb. The nuclear missile is launched toward the belt by Captain Crane, who does it from outside the sub before Alvarez is aware. It explodes in the Van Allen Belt as intended, driving the burning flames away from Earth and saving humanity.

As the sky returns to its normal color, Seaview turns for home, her mission completed.

== Cast ==
- Walter Pidgeon as Admiral Harriman Nelson
- Joan Fontaine as Dr. Susan Hiller
- Barbara Eden as Lieutenant (JG) Cathy Connors
- Peter Lorre as Commodore Lucius Emery
- Robert Sterling as Captain Lee Crane
- Michael Ansara as Miguel Alvarez
- Frankie Avalon as Lieutenant (JG) Danny Romano
- Regis Toomey as Dr. Jamieson
- John Litel as Vice-Admiral B.J. Crawford
- Howard McNear as Congressman Llewellyn Parker
- Henry Daniell as Dr. Emilio Zucco
- Robert Easton as "Sparks"
- Mark Slade as Seaman Jimmy "Red" Smith
- Del Monroe as Seaman Kowski
- Charles Tannen as Gleason

== Production ==
The film was part of an upswing in science fiction and fantasy films of the era, including adaptations of Jules Verne's and H. G. Wells' works.

The film marked Walter Pidgeon's return to filmmaking after several years working in the theater. The role of Captain Crane was originally offered to David Hedison, who turned it down after completing Allen's The Lost World (1960), saying that he did not like the script. He would later play the role in the 1964 television series based on the film. Frankie Avalon's appearance was one of several he made in films around this time where he was cast to appeal to teen audiences; he also sang the title track.

Set designer Herman Blumenthal did not approach the Navy to do research; he relied solely on pictures of naval vessels in the media.

The theatrical release poster shown above is one of four posters that were produced to promote the film. Each one has different wording and slightly different artwork, and each one promotes the film from a different perspective. The above poster also promotes Sturgeon's novelization.

== Reception ==
Voyage to the Bottom of the Sea was previewed on June 18, 1961. It was released to theaters in early July 1961 and had run its course by late fall (September/October). The film played to mixed reviews from critics, but audiences made the film a popular success. Voyage to the Bottom of the Sea was made for US$2 million and brought in US$7 million at the box office.

== Impact ==
For the filming of Voyage to the Bottom of the Sea, detailed sets, props and scale models were created to realize the Seaview submarine. After the film was completed, the sets were placed in storage. When Irwin Allen decided to make a Voyage to the Bottom of the Sea television series, all he had to do was pull the sets out of storage. This was done at a fraction of the cost that he might have had if he had begun from scratch. The film reduced the cost of setting up the show and was the template for the type of stories that were done. The studios, having made the film, helped make the television series easier to produce.

== Other media ==
=== Television ===
The success of the feature film led to the 1964–1968 ABC television series, Voyage to the Bottom of the Sea. During the series run, the film's storyline was remade as a one-hour episode, written by Willam Welch, and titled "The Sky's on Fire". Other scenes from the film were also rewritten and incorporated into the television series.

=== Novels ===
In June 1961, Pyramid Books published a novelization of the film by science fiction writer Theodore Sturgeon. The book went on to be reprinted several times during the 1960s. One of those reprintings pictures Richard Basehart and David Hedison on the cover, but the book is still based on the Walter Pidgeon film. Collectors who want a novelization of the television series should find City Under the Sea. That novel uses the television characters, but should not be confused with either the television series or the later Irwin Allen film with the same name.

Sturgeon's book is based on an early version of the film's script and has the same basic story as the film. It also has a few characters that were not in the film, as well as some additional technical explanation. Some film scenes are different, while some others are wholly absent from the film. Likewise, some film scenes are missing from the book.

The original 1961 book cover portrays a submarine meeting a fanged sea serpent. This scene is not in the novel or the film. The submarine design on the cover does not match the Seaview shown in the film or the Seaview described in the novel: The submarine's bow is opaque, and her "Observation Room" is a rearward projection from the base of the conning tower. The basic shape of the Seaview's hull resembles that of the U.S. Navy's USS Skipjack, the first American nuclear-powered submarine with an "Albacore hull", including its cruciform stern and single-screw propeller.

=== Comics ===
A submarine design very similar to the one used on the 1961 book cover shows up in the 1962 Dell Comics series, Voyage to the Deep (with a similar mission to save the world), that was published to capitalize on the film's popularity. The submarine's mission took it to the Mariana Trench to stop the Earth from wobbling out of orbit. Dell later cancelled the title with issue #4. The submarine was named Proteus, later the name of the submersible seen in the science fiction film Fantastic Voyage (1966).

In 1961, Dell Comics created a full-color adaptation of the Voyage to the Bottom of the Sea film. The comic book was Four Color Comics #1230 and was illustrated by Sam Glanzman. It contains a few publicity stills from the film, plus a section on the history of submarines. In this adaptation, the Admiral's first name is Farragut instead of Harriman.

Mad magazine published a TV series parody entitled, "Voyage to See What's on the Bottom".

=== Other ===
There is also a family board game, manufactured by GemColor, that is tied to the film and not the television series. The game's product carton uses a photo of a wetsuited scuba diver with the eight-foot shooting miniature of the Seaview.

A Voyage to the Bottom of the Sea coloring book for children was released in the mid-1960s.

The film has since been released in multiple territories on VHS, DVD, and Blu-ray.

== See also ==
- List of American films of 1961

== Works cited ==
- Tim Colliver, Seaview: The Making of Voyage to the Bottom of the Sea, 1992, Alpha Control press.
- Voyage to the Bottom of the Sea (VHS)
