= Del Monroe =

American actor (1932–2009)

- Born: Del Monroe; April 7, 1932; Santa Barbara, California, U.S.
- Died: June 5, 2009 (aged 77); Burbank, California, U.S.
- Occupation: Actor
- Years active: 1961–2005

Del Monroe (April 7, 1932 – June 5, 2009) was an American film, television and stage actor. He is best known for his role as Seaman Kowalski in the television series Voyage to the Bottom of the Sea, which was broadcast on ABC from September 14, 1964, to March 31, 1968.

== Early life ==
Monroe was born in Santa Barbara, California. After a tour of duty in the United States Army he enrolled in the Pasadena Playhouse where he appeared in more than 30 plays.

== Voyage to the Bottom of the Sea ==
In 1961, Monroe portrayed Seaman Kowalski in the film version of Voyage to the Bottom of the Sea. Monroe continued in this role in the television series based on the film, although in the series his character's name was changed to Kowalski. He is fondly remembered for this role.

== Other roles ==
In 1967, Monroe appeared in the episode "The Kidnappers" in Irwin Allen's show, The Time Tunnel. Monroe also appeared in other television shows, including Gunsmoke (three episodes), The Silent Force, Emergency! (three episodes), Adam-12, several episodes of Dragnet, Mission: Impossible, Mannix (two episodes), The Amazing Spider-Man, Wonder Woman, The Dukes of Hazzard, The Rockford Files (two episodes), and The Incredible Hulk.

His other film credits include Adam at 6 A.M. (1970), Walking Tall (1973), and as an old timer in Speedway Junky (1999). His final appearance was in an episode of Medium in 2005.

== Filmography ==
| Year | Title | Role | Notes |
|---|---|---|---|
| 1959 | Revenge of the Virgins | Curt - the Young Deserter | |
| 1960 | The Girl in Lovers Lane | Mugger in Train Yard | |
| 1961 | Voyage to the Bottom of the Sea | Seaman Kowalski | |
| 1964-1970 | Voyage to the Bottom of the Sea | Kowalski / Panelman | TV series, 98 episodes |
| 1970 | Adam at 6 A.M. | Mutt Peavine | |
| 1972 | Mission Impossible | Hauser | TV Episode: "Image" |
| 1973 | Walking Tall | Otie Doss | |
| 1973 | The Mad Bomber | Youth on Tower | |
| 1999 | Speedway Junky | Old Timer | |
