= Stoney Burke (TV series) =

1962 American television series

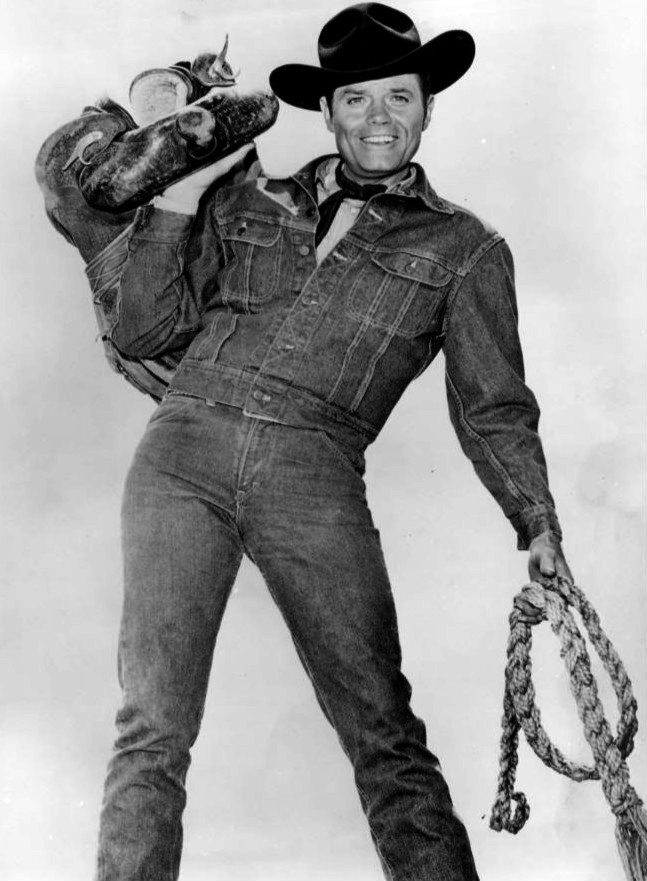
- Jack Lord as Stoney Burke
- Genre: Contemporary Western
- Created by: Leslie Stevens
- Written by: Leslie Stevens
- Directed by: Leslie Stevens
- Starring: Jack Lord; Warren Oates; Robert Dowdell; Bruce Dern
- Theme music composer: Dominic Frontiere
- Composer: Dominic Frontiere
- Country of origin: United States
- Original language: English
- No. of seasons: 1
- No. of episodes: 32

Production
- Producer: Leslie Stevens
- Camera setup: Single-camera
- Running time: 60 minutes
- Production company: Daystar Productions

Original release
- Network: ABC
- Release: October 1, 1962 – May 20, 1963

Stoney Burke is an American contemporary Western television series broadcast on ABC with new episodes from October 1, 1962 to May 20, 1963 and summer repeats until August 12, 1963. Jack Lord starred in the title role. Burke is a professional rodeo cowboy who specializes in saddle bronc riding and competes for the Golden Buckle, presented annually to the rodeo world champion in each rodeo event.

== Overview ==
During his quest for the Golden Buckle, Stoney becomes entangled in the lives of numerous people and is accompanied on the rodeo circuit by friends Ves Painter (Warren Oates), Cody Bristol (Robert Dowdell, credited as Bob Dowdell starting with episode 13) and E. J. Stocker (Bruce Dern).

Lord said that he wanted Stoney Burke to move beyond rodeos "into good thematically solid stories." He added, "What we're trying to do is say something to gently lift the moral tone of society. We have a responsibility to ennoble and enlighten as well as entertain."

== Production ==
Leslie Stevens was the producer. Daystar Productions partnered with United Artists to produce the series. Dominic Frontiere scored the episodes. “The Stoney Burke Theme” was recorded by Maureen Bayand (released by United Artists) and by Nelson Riddle (released by Capitol).

Stoney Burke was broadcast on Mondays from 9 to 10 p. m. Eastern Time. Its competition on CBS were two top-rated sitcoms, The Danny Thomas Show and The Andy Griffith Show, while NBC aired second half of the hour-long newspaper drama Saints and Sinners and nighttime version of the daytime half-hour game show The Price Is Right. In February 1963, NBC replaced Saints and Sinners with the second hour of NBC Monday Night at the Movies and The Price Is Right with the half-hour celebrity panel series The Art Linkletter Show.

By May 1963, plans were underway for syndication of the show. A representative of Economee Television Programs (a subsidiary of United Artists Television) said that stations in 14 major markets had bought the series. Those markets included Chicago, Dallas, Detroit, Indianapolis, and Los Angeles.

== Reception ==
On Thursday, September 20, 1962, 11 days before the premiere of Stoney Burke, NBC debuted its own drama about rodeo performers, Wide Country. Both series were contemporary Westerns that debuted at the end of the time when Western programs—a fixture of late 1950s and early 1960s television—had been a number one draw on the medium. By the mid-1960s, market saturation had begun to take its toll; while established series such as Bonanza and Gunsmoke continued to thrive, new shows with less than robust ratings struggled to survive. Both rodeo series were cancelled after one season.

William W. Savage, in his book The Cowboy Hero: His Image in American History & Culture, commented, ". . . while the rodeo format afforded the sorts of dramatic possibilities (weekly changes of locale and population, for example) that had ensured the success of dozens of western programs, it seems clear that rodeo performers paled in comparison to the 'genuine' television cowboy heroes . . .".

== Guest stars ==
- Philip Abbott
- Philip Ahn
- Denise Alexander
- John Anderson
- Michael Anderson Jr.
- Elizabeth Ashley
- Ed Asner
- Edward Binns
- Willis Bouchey
- Patricia Breslin
- Geraldine Brooks
- Edgar Buchanan
- James Callahan
- Dyan Cannon
- J. D. Cannon
- Harry Carey Jr.
- Jean Carson
- Conlan Carter
- Virginia Christine
- Steve Cochran
- Nudie Cohn
- Paul Comi
- Jeanne Cooper
- Ted de Corsia
- Henry Darrow
- Jim Davis
- John Dehner
- Robert Duvall
- Robert Emhardt
- Jena Engstrom
- Eduard Franz
- Dabbs Greer
- Mariette Hartley
- Peter Helm
- Carol Henry
- Michael Hinn
- Diana Hyland
- L. Q. Jones
- John Larch
- Cloris Leachman
- Gene Lyons
- Scott Marlowe
- Strother Martin
- Rod McGaughy
- Lin McCarthy
- Mark Miller
- George Mitchell
- Leonard Nimoy
- Ed Nelson
- Simon Oakland
- Carroll O'Connor
- Michael Parks
- William Phipps
- Judson Pratt
- Ford Rainey
- Peter Mark Richman
- Charles Robinson
- Chris Robinson
- Bing Russell
- Mark Russell
- Albert Salmi
- Cosmo Sardo
- William Schallert
- Jacqueline Scott
- Vito Scotti
- Pilar Seurat
- Tom Simcox
- Mark Slade
- William Smith
- Fay Spain
- Joan Staley
- Dean Stanton
- Maxine Stuart
- Buck Taylor
- Kenneth Tobey
- Jack Tornek
- Joyce Van Patten
- Charles Wagenheim
- Jack Weston

== Episodes ==
Note: Other than occasional exceptions, character names do not appear in on-screen credits and are derived from contemporary sources, TV listings and personal viewing.

No.	Title	Directed by	Written by	Original release date
1	"The Contender"	Leslie Stevens	Leslie Stevens	October 1, 1962
Cody Bristol, the son of wealthy horse breeder Clay Bristol blames Stoney for his brother's death in a rodeo stall accident while his sister Erlie takes a personal interest in Stoney. Meanwhile, rodeo promoter Everett Fields offers Stoney a star contract, while champion rider Royce Hamilton, who is engaged to marry Erlie, tells Stoney that if he prefers not to ride Megaton, the same deadly horse responsible for the earlier accident, he can choose a safer bucking bronco.: CO–STARRING Kate Manx..........Erlie Bristol; SPECIAL GUEST STAR Philip Abbott..........Royce Hamilton; CAST Carl Benton Reid..........Clay Bristol Bartlett Robinson..........Everett Fields Cleo Ann..........Ruby Lee Bill Hart..........Red uncredited: Rod McGaughy.....rodeo cowboy; Notes: Episode title does not appear on-screen. Kate Manx was married to series producer, director and writer Leslie Stevens from 1958 until shortly before her death in November 1964.
2	"Fight Night"	Leslie Stevens	Leslie Stevens	October 8, 1962
A rodeo in Cade City, arranged by hospital charity commissioner Vernon Dawes, Cody's uncle stock contractor Cal Bristol and arena director McAllister, is forced to cancel when the arena is declared unsafe by the sheriff working for police commissioner Turk Willard who has arranged a prizefight headlined by Art Paxton for the same night. As part of the political infighting, the sheriff insists on an unnecessary unloading and inspection of riding bulls which causes one of the rodeo workers to be fatally trampled, leaving Stoney responsible for delivering the news to his grieving widow Mrs. Miller.: CAST Edgar Buchanan..........Vernon Dawes Alan Bunce..........Turk Willard George Mitchell..........Cal Bristol Bill Hart..........Red Claudia Bryar..........Mrs. Miller Leonard Nimoy..........Art Paxton Bill Zuckert..........sheriff Paul Birch..........McAllister uncredited: Michael Fox.....Moore; Note: Episode title does not appear on-screen and the standard opening rodeo sequence with the credits "Warren Oates (as Ves Painter) with Robert Dowdell and Bruce Dern" is also missing. A preview of next week's "Child of Luxury" is shown before the closing credits.
3	"Child of Luxury"	Leslie Stevens	Leslie Stevens	October 15, 1962
Sutton Meade, the strong-willed daughter of powerful financier Howard Meade, tired of her henpecked suitor Roger Chase, tells Stoney to take her to the local dance and, when he refuses, she crosses Stoney's name off the list of competitors presented to her by stock contractor Cal Bristol. Stoney turns to competitor supervisor Lorraine and she restores his name. Sutton demands action from her compliant father who tells his associate Charley Fitch to offer Stoney 1st-prize money or close the rodeo. After Stoney turns down all offers not to ride, Fitch sends henchmen to him a beating. As a last resort, Meade himself comes to the rodeo and threatens Stoney's life, but ultimately admits defeat to Sutton.: GUEST STARS Ina Balin..........Sutton Meade; Eduard Franz..........Howard Meade; CAST Judson Laire..........Charley Fitch George Mitchell..........Cal Bristol Charles Carlson..........Roger Chase Bill Hart..........Red Dee J. Thompson..........Lorraine and Stan Berman..........doctor uncredited: Shep Houghton.....member of Howard Meade's committee; Note: Episode begins with a teaser trailer and ends with preview of next week's "Point of Honor".
4	"Point of Honor"	Leslie Stevens	Leslie Stevens	October 22, 1962
When the rodeo arrives in a Southern town, Stoney comes into conflict with Soames Hewitt, the son of influential Judge Hewitt, over Soames' exaggerated belief in his bull-riding ability and his notion that Stoney belittled his good name as a descendant of old Southern aristocracy. Soames' distressed sister Lee Anne comes to see Stoney at the rodeo and explains that Soames fell under the bad influence of his two compatriots Dell Tindall and Leroy Sutter. A subsequent fight between Stoney and Soames in front of the rodeo audience brings a warning of suspension to Stoney from rodeo coordinator Rex Donally.: GUEST STAR Scott Marlowe..........Soames Hewitt; CAST Patricia Breslin..........Lee Anne Hewitt Ben Johnson..........Rex Donally Ian Wolfe..........Judge Hewitt Bill Hart..........Red Bill Mullikin..........Leroy Sutter Lew Brown..........trooper Casey Tibbs..........rodeo judge AND Dean Stanton as Dell Tindall uncredited: George Holmes.....man in bar; Note: Episode begins with a teaser.
5	"The Mob Riders"	Leslie Stevens	Leslie Stevens	October 29, 1962
Real estate developer Clyde Lampert shows Stoney a dilapidated racetrack that can be converted into a rodeo venue. The interaction is being surreptitiously observed by stock car racer Tack Reynolds who, with his companion member of a racing club, Bill Sutter and others, had been using the track for years to stage speed driving events. Tack's girlfriend Arlette Hughes is the daughter of powerful businessman and county council president Frank Hughes who is adamantly opposed to any compromise with the racers. After meeting the racing association's medical supervisor, Dr. Glen Elden, Stoney begins to sympathize with the racers' viewpoint.: CAST Gene Lyons..........Clyde Lampert Denise Alexander..........Arlette Hughes Bill Gunn..........Bud Sutter Curt Conway..........Dr. Glen Elden Ford Rainey..........Frank Hughes John Duke..........police sergeant Kim Hamilton..........Beth Ann Sutter Bill Hart..........Red AND Michael Parks as Tack Reynolds uncredited: Buck Taylor.....one of young racers; Note: Episode starts with cold open and the opening credits depict "Warren Oates (as Ves Painter)" as separate billing followed by "Robert Dowdell and Bruce Dern". A preview of next week's "A Matter of Pride" is screened before the closing credits.
6	"A Matter of Pride"	Leslie Stevens	Leslie Stevens	November 5, 1962
In the town hosting the rodeo, local bull rider Miller Hill insists on lashing his hand to the bull despite being told of the danger and is killed in front of the rodeo audience. A few minutes later, state senator Dean Guttman, speaking on behalf of the rodeo committee, announces closure of the rodeo. Stoney takes up a collection and goes to visit Hill's impoverished family — his son Dayton who was assisting him at the rodeo, his daughter Meryle and his widow Flora. At the town meeting, charity committee chairwoman Ruth Coles tells stock contractor Cal Bristol that had she known that rodeo was so dangerous, she would never have organized it. Following a 6 to 4 vote to cancel the rodeo, Stoney is approached by sleazy local merchant Reese Ludlow who offers to change the vote with the help of his brutish compatriot Penn Hudson.: GUEST STARS Ben Piazza..........Dayton Hill William Windom..........Reese Ludlow Conrad Janis..........Penn Hudson; CAST Jena Engstrom..........Meryle Hill Virginia Christine..........Flora Hill Edith Atwater..........Ruth Coles George Mitchell..........Cal Bristol Bill Hart..........Red Robert Brubaker..........Senator Dean Guttman Henry Scott..........gas station attendant uncredited: Michael Hinn.....Miller Hill; Note: Episode begins with a teaser and ends with a preview of next week's "Sidewinder".
7	"Sidewinder"	Leslie Stevens	Leslie Stevens	November 12, 1962
Stoney rides Sidewinder, an uncontrollable horse that throws him and then crashes into the stands, fatally injuring the wife of audience member Morgan Julian. As Stoney is leaving for a rodeo in another town, attorney Joe Gullion hands him a court order requiring his testimony in a wrongful death suit against numerous entities, including stock contractor Cal Bristol. Stoney goes to see the easygoing Julian, but standing next to him is his implacable cousin Mr. Holland who demands retribution. Meanwhile, Ves finds audience member Buck Buckley, who was in the box seat near the victim and claims that a blonde sitting next to her must have caused the injury because the horse did not touch her. While drinking in a bar with Buck, Ves goes to the phone booth and, upon returning, is told by head waitress Maxine that Buck walked out. In court, Ceil Cowan, the blonde witness to the accident, blames Stoney.: GUEST STARS Edward Binns..........Joe Gullion; Mark Miller..........Morgan Julian; CAST David White..........Mr. Holland Gail Kobe..........Ceil Cowan George Mitchell..........Cal Bristol Bill Hart..........Red Shirley O'Hara..........nurse Helen Gurley Brown..........Maxine and Strother Martin..........Buck Buckley uncredited: Rod McGaughy.....member of rodeo audience; Note: Episode begins with a teaser and the standard opening rodeo sequence does not list the credits "Warren Oates (as Ves Painter) with Robert Dowdell and Bruce Dern", but those names do appear in the closing credits. Helen Gurley Brown, whose bestselling book Sex and the Single Girl was released in May 1962, six months before this episode's air date, made her sole acting appearance here, playing the credited bit part of Maxine, a bar waitress in a scene with Warren Oates and Strother Martin. Also, the actor playing the judge, a character with a substantial speaking role, is not listed in the credits.
8	"The Scavenger"	Leslie Stevens	Leslie Stevens	November 19, 1962
In an alley, Ves robs a dead man of his watch and money. He puts the watch in a trash can, but the derelict saw everything and takes the watch. As Ves sits drinking in a bar, Lieutenant Voight and Sergeant Tate arrive and arrest him for murder of Howard Foley, the man whose money and watch Ves had taken. Stoney, Cody and E.J. try to prove Ves' innocence and Stoney joins Voight and Tate in visiting Foley's home and talking to his widow Suzan and his accountant brother Frank. Afterwards, Stoney, Cody and E.J. see the derelict sleeping in the alley with Foley's watch on his wrist. The derelict, who can barely speak and only grunts, identifies Foley's brother as the man who was in the alley before Ves.: CAST John Kellogg..........Lieutenant Voight Paul Comi..........Frank Foley Shirley Ballard..........Suzan Foley Bill Hart..........Red Roy Glenn..........Sergeant Tate and Enoch Gates as THE DERELICT; Note: Episode starts with cold open and the opening credits depict "Warren Oates (as Ves Painter)" as separate billing followed by "Robert Dowdell and Bruce Dern". A preview of next week's "Spin a Golden Web" is screened before the closing credits. The unshaven, tousle-haired and inarticulate derelict was portrayed by James Mason, billed in the end credits as "Enoch Gates", the name of a minor character in Hero's Island, the theatrical feature written, produced and directed by Leslie Stevens and released on September 16, 1962, two months before the broadcast of this episode. Mason was the film's co-producer and starred as Jacob Weber, the film's leading protagonist. Stevens' wife Kate Manx, who was the top-billed co-star in episode 1, had the female lead and, among the supporting players, were Warren Oates as well as Dean Stanton (before he attained fame as "Harry Dean Stanton"), who appeared in episode 4.
9	"Spin a Golden Web"	Robert Butler	Philip Saltzman	November 26, 1962
Millionaire land developers and rodeo fans Roy Hazelton and Lyle Sweet enter into a high-stakes personal bet that if veteran rider Bruce Austin wins, Hazelton will sell Sweet his land at Sweet's price and, if Stoney wins, Sweet will have to sell his parcels to Hazelton, with the land capable of generating millions in oil and other profits. Austin has a pin in his leg but can't afford to retire because he and his wife Betty don't have enough savings so Sweet's monetary offer is a welcome relief, while Hazelton invites Stoney, Ves, Cody and E.J. to a party at his mansion where Stoney meets Hazelton's sad and dispirited wife Mavis and his highly-paid but constantly humiliated assistant Bert.: GUEST STARS Robert Webber..........Roy Hazelton; Salome Jens..........Mavis Hazelton; CAST John Anderson..........Bruce Austin Ken Lynch..........Lyle Sweet Mary Munday..........Betty Austin James Callahan..........Bert Bill Hart (credited but does not appear) uncredited: Carol Henry.....rodeo cowboy, Cosmo Sardo.....guest at Roy Hazelton's party; Note: Episode begins with cold open and the standard opening rodeo sequence does not list the credits "Warren Oates (as Ves Painter) with Robert Dowdell and Bruce Dern", but those names do appear in the closing credits. A preview of next week's "The Wanderer" is shown before the closing.
10	"The Wanderer"	Leonard Horn	Milton Geiger	December 3, 1962
Stoney's old friend Leora, who is eight months pregnant, came to the rodeo looking for her wandering husband Larry Dawson whom she hasn't seen for six months. Entering the stands, she fainted and Stoney drove her to the hospital where Dr. Laird explained that she is emotionally fragile and the baby could be born at any time. As Stoney is ready to ride a bronco, rodeo manager Farley tells him that he is needed at the hospital. A few minutes later Larry Dawson arrives and asks Farley for a job. Hearing Farley receive a call about Laura Dawson and the hospital, Larry rushes to see her and finds out that she is in the delivery room.: GUEST STARS Albert Salmi..........Larry Dawson; Jacqueline Scott..........Leora Dawson Milton Selzer..........Dr. Laird; CAST Bill Hart..........Red Nora Marlowe..........nurse Roy Engel..........Farley Betty Harford..........nurse Lex Connelly..........Gilligan Bill Erwin..........doctor John Graham..........Kruger Wes Liston..........rodeo cowboy uncredited: Mark Russell.....patron in the diner; Note: Episode begins with cold open and the standard opening rodeo sequence does not list the credits "Warren Oates (as Ves Painter) with Robert Dowdell and Bruce Dern", but those names do appear in the closing credits.
11	"Five by Eight by Eight"	Tom Gries	Palmer Thompson	December 10, 1962
When Cookie arrives in the visiting room of a medium-security prison, convict Nick Martin asks him to see about their old friend Stoney who is scheduled to perform in a charity rodeo supervised by warden Harper and benefitting a prison welfare fund. Among those attending are Fred Carrol. his wife and their teenage daughter Joyce. As comical convict Curly Bradshaw shows Ves, Cody and E.J. the central outdoor arena, Harper tells Stoney that Nick is adjusting well to prison life. However, pulling out a gun prearranged for him in Stoney's equipment by Cookie, Nick takes Stoney and Joyce hostage and forces them on a march through the hot rocky desert outside the prison.: GUEST STAR Ed Nelson..........Nick Martin; CAST Bennye Gatteys..........Joyce Carrol William Schallert..........Warden Harper Bill Hart..........Red Arthur Malet..........Curly Bradshaw Mary Jackson..........Mrs. Carrol John McLiam..........Fred Carrol Joseph Perry..........Captain Bender Garry Walberg..........Cookie uncredited: Carol Henry, Charles Wagenheim.....prison inmates; Note: Episode begins with a cold open.
12	"Bandwagon"	Laslo Benedek	Meyer Dolinsky	December 17, 1962
Senator Tom Lockridge, who is running for reelection, walks through the rodeo waving to the crowd with his campaign manager and business partner Walter Sloan. Stoney, hearing the announcement tells Ves, Cody and E.J. that the senator is a great man. Having completed an outstanding ride, Stoney is called to the senator's hotel room where Lockridge warmly greets him and asks him to make speeches supporting the campaign. Stoney agrees and tells Lockridge of his and his father's gratitude for the senator's long-ago efforts. After a number of successful rallies, one public meeting is interrupted by Paul Grayson shouting that Lockridge is a thief and a murderer. Beaten into unconscousness by Lockridge's bodyguards, Grayson is in critical condition at the hospital where Stoney finds out the truth from Grayson's daughter Laura and is subsequently framed for attempted assault of Betty Jo Wilson while Ves questions her waitress friend Merle Rogers.: GUEST STAR Larry Gates..........Senator Tom Lockridge; CAST Warren Stevens..........Walter Sloan Joan Chambers..........Betty Jo Wilson Bill Hart..........Red Jean Carson..........Merle Rogers Len Lesser..........Leo James Bell..........archivist AND "Mariette Hartley as LAURA" uncredited: Sol Gorss.....Senator Lockridge's bodyguard, Bill Quinn.....Dr. Connors, Addison Richards.....Paul Grayson; Note: Episode begins with a cold open and ends with a preview of next week's "Cousin Eunice".
13	"Cousin Eunice"	Tom Gries	Bob Barbash	December 24, 1962
E.J. is told by stock contractor Cal Bristol that his cousin Eunice Stocker, whom he remembers as a rough-mannered Wild West frontierswoman, has been calling and wants to see him. E.J., assisted by Cody, tries convincing Stoney to take her out on a date, but winds up paying Ves ten dollars to go to her hotel and greet her with flowers. Ves brings her to the rodeo, introduces her to Cody, Red and even E.J., but Stoney impresses her the most. Then, upon seeing trick rider Francie Adams, Eunice announces that she wants to be one. Ves, Cody, Cal Bristol and E.J. try convincing rodeo specialty acts manager Shep Winters to give Eunice a try, but he pushes back. However, after seeing Eunice's riding skills, he offers her a job, but only if she creates a more feminine appearance.: GUEST STAR Cloris Leachman..........Cousin Eunice Stocker; CAST George Mitchell..........Cal Bristol Bill Hart..........Red John Newton..........desk clerk asked by Ves about Eunice Jo Marie Ward..........Francie Adams and Jim Davis as Shep Winters; Note: From this episode onward, the standard opening rodeo sequence changes "Robert" to "Bob" in the credits "Warren Oates (as Ves Painter) with Bob Dowdell and Bruce Dern". The episode begins with a cold open and ends with a preview of next week's "Gold-Plated Maverick".
14	"Gold-Plated Maverick"	William A. Graham	S.S. Schweitzer	January 7, 1963
15	"Death Rides a Pale Horse"	Tom Gries	Frank L. Moss	January 14, 1963
16	"The King of the Hill"	Tom Gries	John Falvo	January 21, 1963
17	"A Matter of Percentage"	William A. Graham	Richard Levinson & William Link	January 28, 1963
18	"Image of Glory"	John Erman	Bob Barbash	February 4, 1963
19	"Cat's Eyes"	Laslo Benedek	Philip Saltzman	February 11, 1963
20	"Web of Fear"	Laszlo Benedek	Ed Adamson	February 18, 1963
21	"Point of Entry"	Leonard Horn	Leslie Stevens	March 4, 1963
22	"To Catch the Kaiser"	Tom Gries	Philip Saltzman	March 11, 1963
23	"Joby"	John Erman	Philip Saltzman	March 18, 1963
24	"Forget Me More"	Robert Butler	Peter Packer	March 25, 1963
25	"Color Him Lucky"	Laslo Benedek	Donn Mullally	April 1, 1963
26	"The Weapons Man"	Leslie Stevens	Leslie Stevens	April 8, 1963
27	"Kelly's Place"	Tom Gries	Stephen Lord	April 15, 1963
28	"Kincaid"	Leonard J. Horn	Bob Barbash	April 22, 1963
29	"A Girl Named Amy"	Lalso Benedek	Bob Barbash & S.S.Schweitzer	April 29, 1963
30	"Tigress by the Tail"	Tom Gries	Barry Trivers	May 6, 1963
31	"The Test"	Leonard J. Horn	Bob Barbash	May 13, 1963
32	"The Journey"	Leslie Stevens	Leslie Stevens	May 20, 1963

== DVD release ==
On April 16, 2013, Timeless Media Group released Stoney Burke - The Complete Series on DVD in Region 1. The six disc set includes all 32 episodes of the series.

== See also ==
Jack Lord filmography

== Sources ==
- McNeil, Alex. Total Television (1996). New York: Penguin Books ISBN 0-14-024916-8
- Brooks, Tim and Marsh, Earle, The Complete Directory to Prime Time Network and Cable TV Shows (1999). New York: Ballantine Books ISBN 0-345-42923-0
