= It Happened in Flatbush =

1942 film by Ray McCarey

- Directed by: Ray McCarey
- Written by: Harold Buchman; Lee Loeb
- Produced by: Walter Morosco
- Starring: Lloyd Nolan; Carole Landis; Sara Allgood
- Cinematography: Charles G. Clarke
- Edited by: J. Watson Webb Jr.
- Music by: David Buttolph; Cyril J. Mockridge
- Production company: 20th Century Fox
- Distributed by: 20th Century Fox
- Release date: May 28, 1942
- Running time: 80 minutes
- Country: United States
- Language: English

It Happened in Flatbush is a 1942 American sports comedy film directed by Ray McCarey and starring Lloyd Nolan, Carole Landis and Sara Allgood. The film is a baseball comedy inspired by the 1941 Brooklyn Dodgers' pennant win.

This film's sets were designed by Lewis Creber and Richard Day.

== Plot ==
Frank Maguire is an ace ballplayer whose error costs the Brooklyn team the pennant and his place in the lineup. Though still reviled by the fans, seven years later the team owner brings him back as its manager. He takes charge of the team and whips them into contention. The players resent Maguire's drill-sergeant tactics, and when Maguire falls in love with the pretty, new owner of the team Kathryn Baker, the players use this as an excuse to circulate a petition demanding Maguire's ouster. The manager changes their minds with a speech about how they owe the fans their best effort and leads his team to a league pennant.

== Cast ==
- Lloyd Nolan as Frank 'Butterfingers' Maguire
- Carole Landis as Kathryn Baker
- Sara Allgood as Mrs. 'Mac' McAvoy
- William Frawley as Sam Sloan
- Robert Armstrong as Danny Mitchell
- Jane Darwell as Mrs. Maguire
- George Holmes as Roy (Collins) Anderson
- Scotty Beckett as Squint
- Joseph Allen as Walter Rogers
- James Burke as Umpire Shaunnessy
- Roger Imhof as Mr. Maguire
- Matt McHugh as O'Doul
- LeRoy Mason as J.C. Scott, Catcher
- Pat Flaherty as Pat O'Hara, Pitcher
- Dale Van Sickel as Stevenson, First Baseman
- John Burger as Jim Harding, Outfielder
- Robert Homans as Mr. Collins
- Mary Gordon as Mrs. Collins

== See also ==
- List of baseball films

== Bibliography ==
- Fleming, E.J. Carole Landis: A Tragic Life in Hollywood. McFarland, 2005.
