= Voyage to the Bottom of the Sea (novel) =

Book adaptation of the 1961 film by Theodore Sturgeon

- First edition
- Author: Theodore Sturgeon
- Cover artist: Jim Mitchell
- Language: English
- Genre: science-fiction novel
- Published: 1961 (Pyramid Books)
- Publication place: United States of America
- Media type: Print (Paperback)
- Pages: 159 (Paperback edition)
- OCLC: 6808760

Voyage to the Bottom of the Sea is a science-fiction novel written by Theodore Sturgeon and first published in 1961 by Pyramid Books. Sturgeon wrote the novel from the screenplay that Irwin Allen and Charles Bennett wrote from an original story by Allen. The movie also inspired a television series that ran for four years on ABC.

== Plot ==
Under the command of Captain Lee Crane and with Admiral Harriman Nelson, Vice-Admiral B. J. Crawford, Congressman Llewellyn Parker, and psychologist Susan Hiller aboard, the nuclear-powered submarine USOS Seaview goes under the Arctic ice for a shakedown cruise. Partway through the cruise the crew find that the ice is melting and when Seaview surfaces they see that the sky appears to be on fire. Radio communication is extremely difficult, but they get a request to come to New York, where the United Nations are holding a meeting of top scientists. After rescuing a man, Alvarez, from an ice floe, they head south.

With help from Vice-Admiral Crawford, Admiral Nelson collates observations and carries out calculations whose answers tell him what he needs to do. He determines that the inner Van Allen radiation belt has caught fire, pulling air up from the overheating atmosphere. To stop the fire, to save all life on Earth, Seaview must launch a missile at a precise moment from a point northwest of Guam and have the missile spew electrically-charged lampblack into the outer radiation belt. The admiral must, however, first attend the meeting in New York.

At the United Nations the world-renowned scientist, Dr. Emilio Zucco, insists that the fire will simply burn itself out and should be left alone. Nelson disagrees, but there is no time to argue and recalculate the figures. While Congressman Parker distracts the audience, Nelson and his crew make a break for it and take Seaview out to sea.

South across the Atlantic Seaview runs, pausing only long enough for the crew to tap an undersea telephone cable in a failed attempt to contact the President. Seaview then charges onward, through the Strait of Magellan and into the Pacific Ocean. On their way to the launch point they have to contend with a freshly-laid mine field, a hostile destroyer, an attack submarine, and a gargantuan octopus, as well as an onboard saboteur. Nonetheless, they reach the launch point in time, thwart the saboteur, and succeed in carrying out their mission. They launch the missile and Earth is saved.

== Publication history ==
- 1961, USA, Pyramid Books (#G622), Pub date Jun 1961, Paperback (159 pp)
- 1962, Germany, Pabel Verlag (Utopia Grossband #180), Paperback (96 pp), as Die Feuerflut (The Flood of Fire)
- 1964, USA, Pyramid Books (#R-1068), Pub date Sep & Oct 1964, Paperback (159 pp)
- 1967, USA, Pyramid Books (#R-1068), Pub date Apr & Oct 1967, Paperback (159 pp)
- 1967, The Netherlands, Het Spectrum (Prisma #1275), Paperback (188 pp), as Reis naar het Diepste van de Zee (Journey to the Depths of the Sea)

The most recent update of this novel was in 1984.

== Reviews ==
The book was reviewed by

- Alfred Bester at The Magazine of Fantasy and Science Fiction (Oct 1961)
- P. Schuyler Miller at Analog Science Fact - Science Fiction (Dec 1961)
- Robert Silverberg at Amazing Stories (Apr 1965)
- P. Schuyler Miller at Analog Science Fiction - Science Fact (Jul 1965)

== Adaptations ==
The book was adapted from the screenplay for the movie Voyage to the Bottom of the Sea, which was written by Irwin Allen and Charles Bennett from a story conceived by Irwin Allen. The movie also inspired the television series Voyage to the Bottom of the Sea, which ran on ABC from 14 September 1964 to 31 March 1968.

== Listings ==
The book is listed at

- www.worldcat.org as OCLC 6808760
