= Revenge of the Virgins =

1959 film

- Film poster
- Directed by: Peter Perry Jr.
- Written by: Ed Wood (as Pete LaRoche)(screenplay)
- Produced by: Peter Perry Jr. (producer)
- Starring: Charles Veltmann Jr.; Jodean Lawrence; Stanton Pritchard; Nona Carver
- Cinematography: Gene Gropper; Vilis Lapenieks
- Music by: Gene Kauer
- Release date: 1959
- Running time: 53 minutes
- Country: United States
- Language: English

Revenge of the Virgins is a 1959 American Western nudie cutie film directed by Peter Perry Jr with a screenplay by Ed Wood.

== Plot ==
The film involves a main plot about an entrepreneur leading an expedition to find gold and a subplot about a tribe of women.

== Cast ==
- Charles Veltmann Jr as Melvin Potter
- Jodean Lawrence as Ruby Potter
- Stanton Pritchard as Pan Taggart – the Gold Prospector
- Hank Delgado as Bartender
- Louis Massad as Mike Horton – a Gunslinger
- Jewell Morgan as Golden Horde Guard #2
- Ralph Cookson as Wade Condon – a Gunslinger
- Betty Shay as Golden Horde Guard #3
- Del Monroe as Curt – Young Deserter
- Jan Lee as Golden Horde Guard #4
- Hugo Stanger as Jones – Older Deserter
- Nona Carver as Golden Horde Guard #5
- Joanne Bowers as Yellow Gold
- Ramona Rogers as Golden Horde Guard #6
- Pat O'Connell as Golden Horde Guard #1
- Kenne Duncan as Narrator only

== Gallery ==
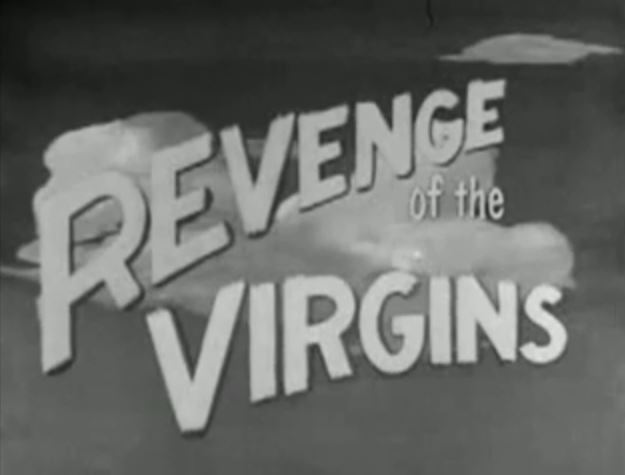
Title card

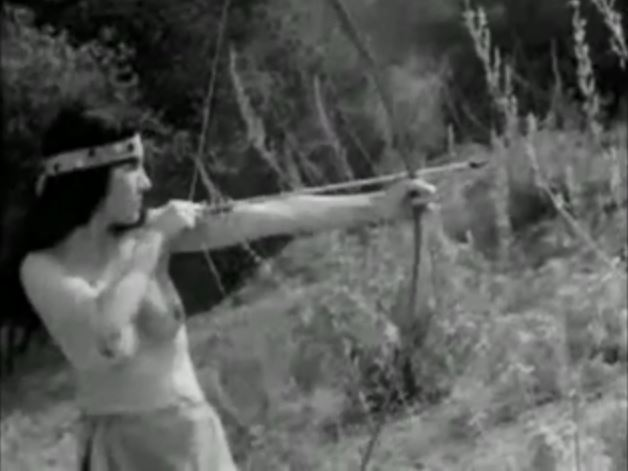

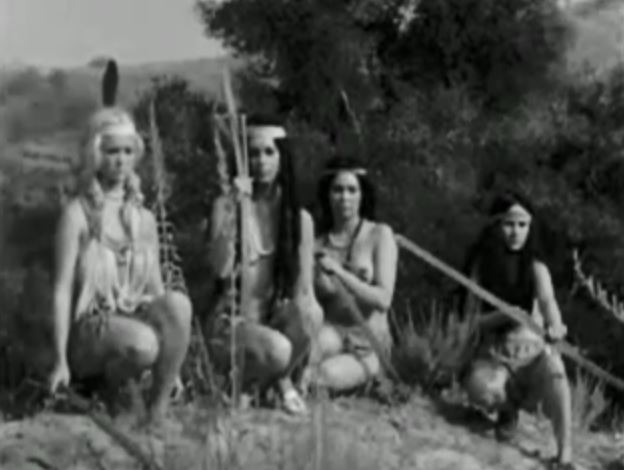

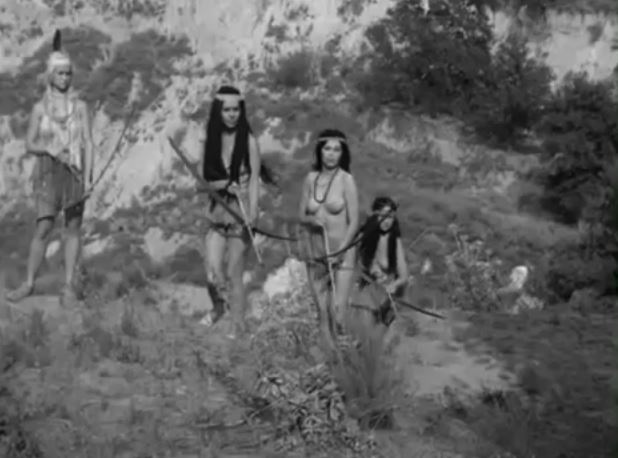

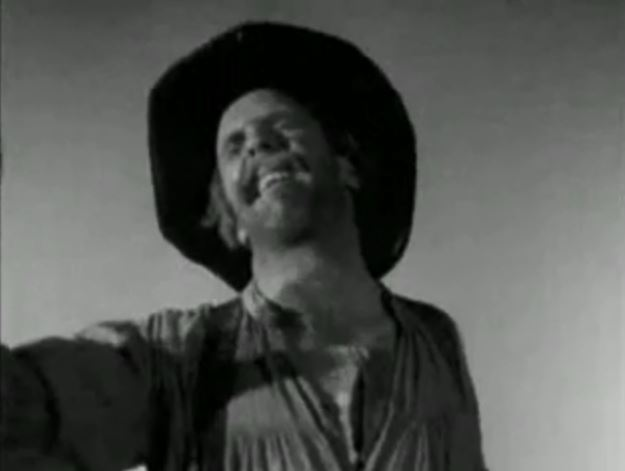
Stanton Pritchard

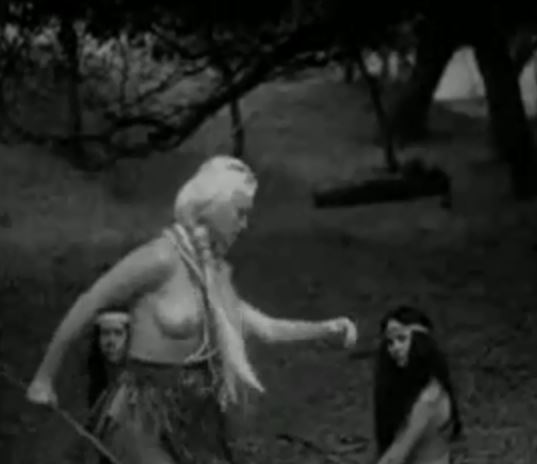

== Reception ==
In a retrospective review 2015, Film Blitz scored it a C+ writing "Great exploitation title, and the film wastes absolutely no time [...] However, its true nature then becomes apparent. This is a straightforward Western, into which nudie - okay, toplessie - content has occasionally been spliced." and that "one can only imagine the surprise the actors in the main thread must have felt on seeing the finished product."

Travis Mills of Running Wild Films wrote in 2019 that "The film is on one hand ridiculous and cheap; on the other, it's far better than I could ever imagine it to be." and "What makes this part-nudie Western worth watching is its simple plot and execution." He concluded that "I would honestly take another one like this over the bloated flashy big-budget Westerns of today".

A review on The Movie Scene was less favorable, stating about the subplot of the tribe that "I honestly can't come up with a single word of praise when it comes to this side of the movie". It further said that "What this all boils down to is that Revenge of the Virgins is as poor as it sounds and in all honesty I wonder if the movie was just away of getting some attractive women to do a topless tribal dance as that seems to be the longest unedited scene in the entire movie."
