= Voyage to the Bottom of the Sea (TV series) =

American sci-fi television series (1964–1968)

- Cover art from the 2006 DVD release of the 1st season of Voyage to the Bottom of the Sea showing stars Richard Basehart and David Hedison, with the submarine Seaview (center)
- Created by: Irwin Allen
- Starring: Richard Basehart; David Hedison; Robert Dowdell; Henry Kulky; Terry Becker; Del Monroe; Arch Whiting; Paul Trinka; Allan Hunt; Richard Bull; Paul Carr
- Composers: Paul Sawtell; Hugo Friedhofer; Alexander Courage; Morton Stevens; Michael Hennagin (one episode); Jerry Goldsmith (one episode); Leith Stevens; Lennie Hayton; Nelson Riddle (one episode); Herman Stein (one episode); Robert Drasnin (one episode); Harry Geller; Joseph Mullendore; Irving Gertz (one episode)
- Country of origin: United States
- No. of seasons: 4
- No. of episodes: 110 (list of episodes)

Production
- Running time: 60 minutes (including commercials)
- Production companies: Cambridge Productions Inc. Irwin Allen Productions; 20th Century-Fox Television

Original release
- Network: ABC
- Release: September 14, 1964 – March 31, 1968

Voyage to the Bottom of the Sea is an American science fiction television series based on the 1961 movie. Both were created by Irwin Allen, which enabled the film's sets, costumes, props, special effects models, and sometimes footage, to be used in the production of the television series. Voyage to the Bottom of the Sea was the first of Irwin Allen's four science fiction television series (the three others being Lost in Space, The Time Tunnel, and Land of the Giants), and the longest-running. The show's theme was underwater adventure.

Voyage was broadcast on ABC from September 14, 1964, to March 31, 1968. The 110 episodes produced included 32 shot in black-and-white (1964–1965), and 78 filmed in color (1965–1968). The first two seasons took place in the then-future of the 1970s. The final two seasons took place in the 1980s. The show starred Richard Basehart and David Hedison.

== Show history ==
=== Pilot episode ===
The pilot episode "Eleven Days to Zero" was filmed in 1963 in color but shown in black-and-white to match the rest of the first season which aired the following year. It introduces the audience to the futuristic nuclear submarine S.S.R.N. Seaview and the lead members of her crew, including the designer and builder of the submarine Admiral Harriman Nelson (Richard Basehart), and Commander Lee Crane (David Hedison), who becomes the Seaview's captain after the murder of her original commanding officer. The submarine is based at the Nelson Institute of Marine Research in Santa Barbara, California, and is often moored some 500 ft (150 m) beneath the facility in a secret underground submarine pen carved out of solid rock. The Seaview is officially for undersea marine research and visits many exotic locations in the Seven Seas, but its secret mission is to defend the planet from all world and extraterrestrial threats in the then-future of the 1970s.

=== Season 1 ===
The first season's 32 episodes included gritty, atmospheric story lines devoted to Cold War themes and excursions into near-future speculative fiction, involving espionage and science fiction elements. Aliens, sea monsters and dinosaurs were featured, but the primary villains were hostile foreign governments. While fantastic, the scripts had a recognisably contemporary setting.

The first episodes began with Admiral Nelson and the crew of the Seaview fighting against a foreign government to prevent a world-threatening earthquake, and continuing with a foreign government destroying American submarines with new technologies in "The Fear Makers" and "The Enemies". The season also had several ocean peril stories in which the Seaview crew spent the episode dealing with the normal perils of the sea. Two examples are "Submarine Sunk Here" and "The Ghost of Moby Dick". The season introduced a diving bell and a mini-submarine, and the first episodes featuring extraterrestrials (Don Brinkley's "The Sky is Falling") and sea monsters.

During the course of the first season, Nelson was promoted from a three-star to a four-star admiral. It was also established that while essentially a marine research vessel, SSRN Seaview was also part of the U.S. nuclear armed fleet (most notably defined in William Read Woodfield's episode, "Doomsday"). The season ended with the Seaview crew fighting a foreign government to save a defense weapon.

=== Season 2 ===
The second season began with a trip inside a whale, a trip inside a volcano, and a few Cold War intrigue and nuclear war-themed episodes, and saw several brushes with world disaster. The season ended with a ghost story, one of the show's few sequels.

Due to ABC's demands for a somewhat "lighter" tone to the series, the second season saw an increase in monster-of-the-week type plots, yet there were still some episodes that harkened back to the tone of the first season. The second season also saw a change from black-and-white to color. The beginning of the second season saw the permanent replacement of Chief "Curly" Jones with Chief Francis Ethelbert Sharkey, due to the death of Henry Kulky, who portrayed Chief Jones.

The most important change in the series occurred during this season when a notably redesigned Seaview interior was introduced, along with the Flying Sub, a yellow, two-man mini-submarine with passenger capacity. The Flying Sub could leave the ocean and become airborne. The futuristic craft greatly increased the Seaview crew's travel options. It was launched from a bay, access to which was via a sealed hatch stairway at the bow section. The Seaview's private observation deck from the first season was never seen again. The Seaview control room was expanded and a large rectangular panel screen of flickering lights was added. The Seaview also now had a powerful laser beam in its bow light. The small mini-sub from the first season was retained and occasionally still used in the color episodes.

The ship's enlisted men were also given more colorful uniforms (red or light blue jumpsuits) and white Keds Champion sneakers. The traditional sailor uniforms worn in the first season were only seen in stock footage from the first season and on characters who were newly filmed to match up with that footage.

A second-season episode, "The Sky's on Fire", was a remake of the basic storyline of Irwin Allen's original film Voyage to the Bottom of the Sea (1961) using considerable film color footage, though several film sequences were removed and had been featured in other first-season episodes such as "The Village of Guilt" and "Submarine Sunk Here."

A few later season two episodes were filmed without Richard Basehart, who was hospitalized for a bleeding ulcer. He filmed the scenes in the Flying Sub for "The Monster's Web" before hospitalization, requiring a stand in and other characters taking over his lines. He was missing entirely from the next two episodes. These episodes didn't feature his character at all, while in one story "The Menfish" Gary Merrill guested as Admiral Park, a colleague of Nelson's who substituted for him. Basehart returned for "Return of the Phantom," the final episode of the season.

=== Season 3 ===
The third season of Voyage to the Bottom of the Sea ran simultaneously with two other series produced by Irwin Allen, Lost in Space (in its second season) and The Time Tunnel.

The third season began with Dick Tufeld (voice of the Robot on Lost in Space) playing an evil disembodied brain from outer space. The season continued with a werewolf story that is one of the few episodes to inspire a sequel. In one episode, the Seaview's officers and crew encountered Nazis who believed World War II was still ongoing. The third season only had two espionage stories and one ocean peril story that were reminiscent of the first season. One of those three stories was about a hostile foreign government trying to steal a strange new mineral with the aid of a brainwashed Admiral Nelson. This espionage story was the end of the third season.

The final two seasons continued the shift towards paranormal storylines that were popular in the late 1960s. Mummies, werewolves, talking puppets, and an evil leprechaun all walked the corridors of the Seaview. There were also fossil men, flame men, frost men, lobster men, and shadow men.

The opening credits were largely identical to the revised season two, but the initial season two yellow lettering credits that were first altered to white, (and then back to yellow on the later revised sequence) were now depicted in a golden/yellowish lettering, and closing credits were set over a green-backed painting of Seaview underwater.

=== Season 4 ===
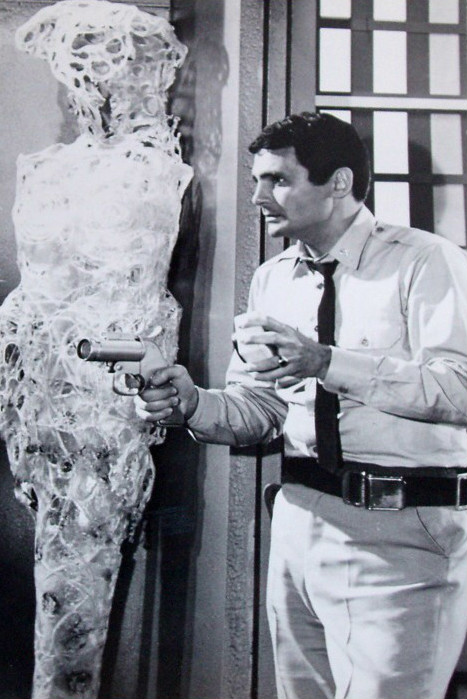
David Hedison as Lee Crane in the episode "Time Lock", 1967

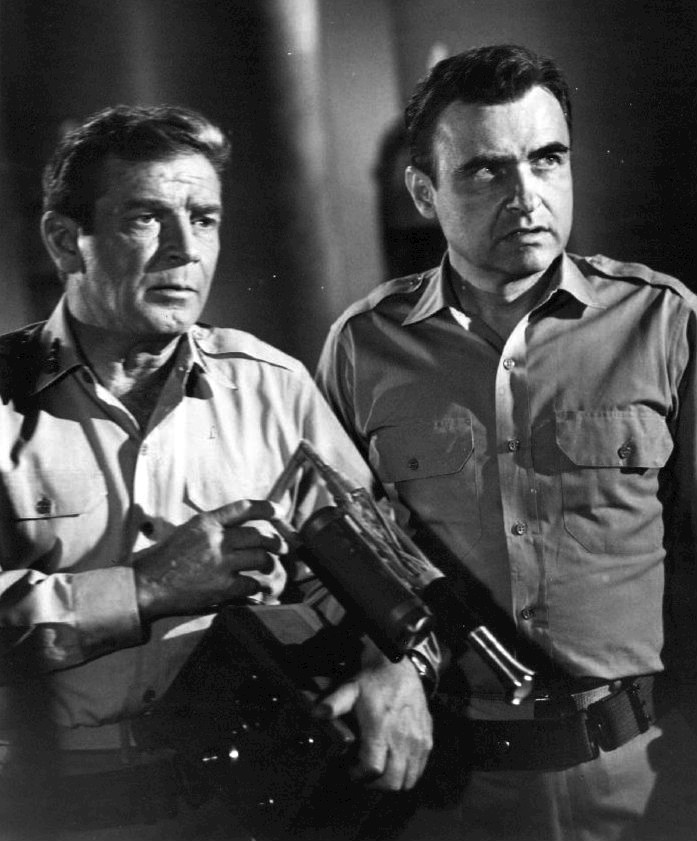
Nelson and Sharkey fight an alien spy, 1968.

The fourth and final season of Voyage began with Victor Jory playing a five-centuries-old alchemist and the Seaview is threatened by the hydrodynamic effects of a major volcanic eruption. Starting with the eighth episode of the season, there were revamped opening credits depicting action sequences and the stars' pictures in color set on a sonar board design. The closing credits picture remained unchanged from season three. Near the end of the fourth season, there were three unrelated stories of extraterrestrial invasion. One episode had an unknown master of disguise infiltrating and wreaking havoc aboard the Seaview. Another episode depicted Nelson, Morton and Sharkey gaslighting Crane. There were two time travel stories featuring the enigmatic but dangerous Mister Pem. The second had the Seaview going back in time to the American Revolution. The episode (and series) ended with the Seaview returning to the present. The final scene of the show had Nelson and Crane sitting in the seldom-used easy chairs on the port side of the observation nose discussing how fast time goes by.

In March 1968 it was announced that Voyage would not be back for a fifth season.

== Music ==
The series' main theme, "The Seaview Theme", was written by Paul Sawtell. A new darker, more serious theme composed by Jerry Goldsmith was introduced at the beginning of the second-season episode "Jonah and the Whale", but this was quickly replaced by the original version. A version of the Goldsmith suite re-orchestrated by Nelson Riddle was heard as incidental music in the episode "Escape From Venice", and the original Goldsmith suite was used as incidental music throughout the rest of the series. The series' main composer, supervisor and conductor was Lionel Newman, who for the second season composed a serious sounding score for when the episode credits (episode title/guests/writer/director) were shown just after the theme song, which would be used by many episodes (starting with "The Left Handed Man") through the second and into the early third season. Other guest composers included Lennie Hayton, Hugo Friedhofer, Star Trek: The Original Series composer Alexander Courage, Morton Stevens, Leith Stevens (no relation) who wrote the music to nine episodes, and Sawtell, who worked on the show for a while in the first season.

GNP Crescendo issued a soundtrack album in 1997 as part of its series tying into the documentary The Fantasy Worlds of Irwin Allen, featuring Sawtell's theme from the series and his score for the pilot episode "Eleven Days to Zero" (tracks 2–6) and Goldsmith's work for "Jonah and the Whale".

1. Voyage to the Bottom of the Sea Main Title (:29)
2. Murderous Pursuit (2:54)
3. Ocean Floor Search/Squid Fight (5:34)
4. Solid Ice (1:48)
5. Lost/Job Well Done (3:35)
6. End Title (The Seaview Theme) (:40)
7. Jonah and the Whale (Main Title) (:30)
8. A Whale of a Whale/Thar She Blows/A Whale of a Time/The Second Dive (4:23)
9. A Meal Fit for a Whale/Crash Dive/Sub Narcotics (4:18)
10. Collision Course I/Collision Course II/Diving Party/Going Down (4:44)
11. Home Free Part I/Home Free Part II (3:58)
12. Jonah and the Whale (End Credit) (:50)

== Cast ==
- Richard Basehart as Admiral Harriman "Harry" Nelson
- David Hedison as Commander Lee Crane
- Robert Dowdell as Lieutenant Commander Chip Morton
- Derrik Lewis as Lieutenant Commander O'Brien (pilot episode, Seasons 1–2)
- Henry Kulky as Chief "Curly" Jones (Season 1)
- Terry Becker as Chief Petty Officer Francis Ethelbert Sharkey (Seasons 2–4)
- Del Monroe as Kowalski
- Arch Whiting as Sparks
- Paul Trinka as Patterson
- Allan Hunt as Stuart "Stu" Riley (Season 2)
- Richard Bull as the Doctor

== Episode list ==
Note: Two different episodes (28 and 73) are both titled "The Creature".

=== Season 1 (1964–65) ===
All episodes (except "Eleven Days to Zero") were made and broadcast in black-and-white

No. overall	No. in season	Title	Directed by	Written by	Original release date
1	1	"Eleven Days to Zero"	Irwin Allen	Irwin Allen	September 14, 1964
A polar earthquake in eleven days could cause the destruction of civilization. Guest starring Eddie Albert, Theo Marcuse, and John Zaremba. Note: This episode was produced in color but was broadcast in black-and-white
2	2	"The City Beneath the Sea"	John Brahm	Richard Landau	September 21, 1964
Two ships have vanished near an island off the coast of Greece. Guest starring Hurd Hatfield, Linda Cristal.
3	3	"The Fear-Makers"	Leonard Horn	Anthony Wilson	September 28, 1964
The Seaview must take up another submarine's mission when it disappears. Guest starring Lloyd Bochner and special guest star Edgar Bergen.
4	4	"The Mist of Silence"	Leonard Horn	John McGreevey	October 5, 1964
The Seaview attempts to rendezvous with an apparent defector from a hostile nation. Guest starring Rita Gam, Alejandro Rey.
5	5	"The Price of Doom"	James Goldstone	Harlan Ellison	October 12, 1964
A scientist on a research facility in Antarctica discovers a new form of sea plankton that turns monstrously large and aggressive if exposed to heat. After the scientist mysteriously disappears, the Seaview is sent in to investigate. Guest starring David Opatoshu, John Milford and Jill Ireland. Screenplay by Harlan Ellison (under his Cordwainer Bird alias, credited as "Cord Wainer Bird").
6	6	"The Sky Is Falling"	Leonard Horn	Don Brinkley	October 19, 1964
A U. F. O. has been spotted flying around the United States, terrifying people and violating every airspace regulation in the book. It falls into the sea, which, after another ship is destroyed investigating it, the Seaview is ordered to check it out. Guest starring Charles McGraw.
7	7	"Turn Back the Clock"	Alan Crosland, Jr.	Sheldon Stark	October 26, 1964
A lone survivor of a doomed Antarctic expedition is rescued. The Seaview takes him and a woman photographer to see if there really is a dinosaur laden tropical paradise somewhere in the Antarctic. Guest starring Nick Adams, Yvonne Craig.
8	8	"The Village of Guilt"	Irwin Allen	Berne Giler	November 2, 1964
In the fjords of a small Norwegian fishing village, a small boat manned by three drunken fishermen is attacked by what appears to be a giant sea monster. Guest starring Richard Carlson, Anna-Lisa.
9	9	"Hot Line"	John Brahm	Berne Giler	November 9, 1964
A Soviet rocket carrying a satellite is crashing back to Earth, and the Seaview must transport two Russian missile experts to find and disarm it. Guest starring Everett Sloane, Ford Rainey, James Doohan, John Banner and special guest star: Michael Ansara.
10	10	"Submarine Sunk Here"	Leonard Horn	William Tunberg	November 16, 1964
The ship's diving bell may be the Seaview's only hope when the sub becomes entangled in a derelict minefield. Co-starring Carl Reindel, Eddie Ryder, Robert Doyle and Wright King.
11	11	"The Magnus Beam"	Leonard Horn	Alan Caillou	November 23, 1964
A powerful magnetic beam has caused the crashes of several spy planes, and has now caught the Seaview, dragging it to its destruction. Co-starring Mario Alcalde, Monique Lemaire, Malachi Throne, Jacques Aubuchon and Joseph Ruskin.
12	12	"No Way Out"	Felix E. Feist	S : Robert Leslie Bellem; S/T : Robert Hamner	November 30, 1964
An important Soviet official is wounded and his daughter captured when they try to defect to the U.S. With the official recovering aboard Seaview, Nelson and the crew must either rescue the daughter or leave her behind. Co-starring Jan Merlin and Danielle De Metz.
13	13	"The Blizzard Makers"	Josef Leytes	S : Joe Madison; S/T : William Welch	December 7, 1964
Admiral Nelson needs the help of a climatologist to help discover why the Gulf Stream has shifted, but doesn't know that the scientist has been brainwashed to kill him to stop him from uncovering the truth. Guest star Werner Klemperer.
14	14	"The Ghost of Moby Dick"	Sobey Martin	Robert Hamner	December 14, 1964
A whale specialist's son is killed when his father's data-gathering methods enrage an enormous whale. Now the crippled father needs Seaview's help to (as he claims) continue his research. Guest stars June Lockhart, Edward Binns.
15	15	"Long Live the King"	László Benedek	Raphael Hayes	December 21, 1964
When his father is assassinated, a young prince abruptly becomes his country's king, but he still has a lot to learn about ruling, and a mysterious sailor may not only help him but also help the crew keep the new king alive. Guest star Carroll O'Connor.
16	16	"Hail to the Chief"	Gerd Oswald	Don Brinkley	December 28, 1964
On his way to an important peace conference, the U.S. President suffers a head injury and needs a brain operation on board the Seaview. Guest star Viveca Lindfors; also starring John Hoyt, Malcolm Atterbury and Edward Platt.
17	17	"The Last Battle"	Felix E. Feist	Robert Hamner	January 4, 1965
Nelson is kidnapped by a group of former Nazis determined to resurrect the Third Reich. Co-starring John Van Dreelen, Joe De Santis, Rudy Solari.
18	18	"Mutiny"	Sobey Martin	William Read Woodfield	January 11, 1965
Nelson and the first officer of a new submarine are the only survivors when the sub is attacked by a giant jellyfish. Guest starring Harold J. Stone.
19	19	"Doomsday"	James Goldstone	William Read Woodfield	January 18, 1965
The Seaview receives a message that the U.S. is at war. Co-starring Donald Harron, Paul Carr.
20	20	"The Invaders"	Sobey Martin	William Read Woodfield	January 25, 1965
An undersea earthquake exhumes hundreds of strange metallic capsules, and a powerful humanoid creature who could destroy mankind is restored to life after millions of years in suspended animation. Guest starring Robert Duvall, credited as "Robert Duval".
21	21	"The Indestructible Man"	Felix E. Feist	Richard Landau	February 1, 1965
The Seaview is tasked with recovering a returned deep space probe. On board the probe is a robot as sophisticated as a man, and capable of experiencing everything a human can. Co-starring Michael Constantine.
22	22	"The Buccaneer"	László Benedek	William Welch & Al Gail	February 8, 1965
The Seaview is seized by a man calling himself the "Buccaneer. As audacious as his plan is, it is only a small piece in a much larger plan. Co-starring Barry Atwater.
23	23	"The Human Computer"	James Goldstone	Robert Hamner	February 15, 1965
The Seaview is converted to full automation with Captain Crane the only human aboard...or so he thinks. Co-starring Simon Scott and Harry Millard.
24	24	"The Saboteur"	Felix E. Feist	William Read Woodfield & George Reed	February 22, 1965
Crane is brainwashed to sabotage an important national defense mission which is being monitored by the national intelligence agency. Co-starring Bert Freed & Warren Stevens; featuring James Brolin.
25	25	"Cradle of the Deep"	Sobey Martin	Robert Hamner	March 1, 1965
The Seaview is sent on a mission that will take it into some of the most dangerous waters in the world for submarines. Adding to the tension one of the officers lost an elder brother on a similar mission years before. Also starring John Anderson.
26	26	"The Amphibians"	Felix E. Feist	Hendrik Vollaerts	March 8, 1965
Two scientists want to rush ahead with the development of an amphibian adaptation for man. Guest stars Skip Homeier and Zale Parry.
27	27	"The Exile"	James Goldstone	William Read Woodfield	March 15, 1965
The premier of the "People's Republic", with some very valuable information, wants to defect to the US. The Seaview is sent to pick him up, but Nelson must first evaluate the information before deciding if the mission worth the risk. Guest star Edward Asner, co-starring David Sheiner.
28	28	"The Creature"	Sobey Martin	Rik Vollaerts	March 22, 1965
When a missile is destroyed by apparent ultrasonic sound, the Seaview investigates with Adams, the mentally unstable launch commander, on board and finds a giant manta ray source which along with Adams' actions pose a threat to safety. Guest star Leslie Nielsen.
29	29	"The Enemies"	Felix E. Feist	William Read Woodfield	March 29, 1965
Investigating the wreck of a submarine, the Seaview uncovers evidence of strange behavior just before the wreck. Guest stars Henry Silva, Tom Skerritt, and Malachi Throne.
30	30	"The Secret of the Loch"	Sobey Martin	Charles Bennett	April 5, 1965
Nelson is to meet a scientist working on a secret project at Loch Ness. When he arrives he discovers the scientist is dead. A series of strange events leads Nelson to believe there may be a way for a submarine to enter the Loch. Guest star Torin Thatcher, co-starring Hedley Mattingly, George Mitchell and John McLiam.
31	31	"The Condemned"	Leonard Horn	William Read Woodfield	April 12, 1965
This episode involves the testing of a new air mixture that will allow a submarine to go to the "bottom of the sea" literally! A brash, news hogging, admiral and his aide, along with his assistant all successfully make the first tests in a diving bell. Then it is time for the Seaview to follow suit. Only then does the real fun begin! Guest star J. D. Cannon, co-starring Arthur Franz, Alvy Moore.
32	32	"The Traitor"	Sobey Martin	William Welch & Al Gail	April 19, 1965
Admiral Nelson's sister is kidnapped, but Nelson soon learns that there's a more sinister behind it. Guest star George Sanders, co-starring Michael Pate, Susan Flannery. Note: This is the last episode to be produced in black-and-white

=== Season 2 (1965–66) ===
All episodes from Season 2 and onwards in color

No. overall	No. in season	Title	Directed by	Written by	Original release date
33	1	"Jonah and the Whale"	Sobey Martin	Shimon Wincelberg	September 19, 1965
When Admiral Nelson and an impatient Russian scientist are trapped inside a diving bell inside a giant whale, it's up to the crew of the Seaview to mount an effective rescue to bring them both back alive. Guest starring Gia Scala. Note: This is the first episode to be shown in color.
34	2	"Time Bomb"	Sobey Martin	William Read Woodfield & Allan Balter	September 26, 1965
Admiral Nelson becomes an unwitting accomplice in a high-stakes game of sabotage designed to overturn the existing world order. Guest star Ina Balin, co-starring Susan Flannery.
35	3	"...And Five of Us Are Left"	Harry Harris	Robert Vincent Wright	October 3, 1965
The Seaview is sent to rescue the surviving crew of a supposedly sunk U.S. WW2 submarine. Guest Star Phillip Pine, co-starring Robert Doyle, Teru Shimada.
36	4	"The Cyborg"	Leo Penn	William Read Woodfield & Allan Balter	October 17, 1965
Nelson is captured and replaced by a look-alike cyborg ordered to start a war. With special guest star Victor Buono, co-starring Brooke Bundy.
37	5	"Escape from Venice"	Alex March	Charles Bennett	October 24, 1965
Captain Crane is entrusted with the key to decipher a set of messages of great importance, but his fellow crewmembers must get to him before the enemy does. Co-starring Renzo Cesana, Vincent Gardenia and Delphi Lawrence.
38	6	"The Left-Handed Man"	Jerry Hopper	William Welch	October 31, 1965
Admiral Nelson risks his life to publicly oppose a popular political nominee secretly backed by a contentious millionaire. Guest star Cyril Delevanti, co-starring Regis Toomey, Barbara Bouchet and Charles Dierkop.
39	7	"The Deadliest Game"	Sobey Martin	Rik Vollaerts	November 7, 1965
Some sort of weapon is blocking all communication to and from an underwater installation while the U.S. President is visiting. Guest starring Lloyd Bochner. Co-starring Audrey Dalton, Robert Cornthwaite and Robert F. Simon.
40	8	"Leviathan"	Harry Harris	William Welch	November 14, 1965
Guest starring Karen Steele, co-starring Liam Sullivan.
41	9	"The Peacemaker"	Sobey Martin	William Read Woodfield & Allan Balter	November 21, 1965
The Seaview sets out to rescue a traitor who can help save the world from a doomsday device of his own making. Guest starring John Cassavetes, co-starring Whit Bissell, Irene Tsu & Dale Ishimoto.
42	10	"The Silent Saboteurs"	Sobey Martin	S : Max Ehrlich; T : Sidney Marshall	November 28, 1965
Captain Crane and his crew team up with foreign agents to neutralize an enemy weapon, but not all the agents are what they seem to be. Guest starring Pilar Seurat, co-starring George Takei, Bert Freed.
43	11	"The X Factor"	Leonard Horn	William Welch	December 5, 1965
An American weapons scientist is kidnapped by a major spy ring, and the only lead is a mysterious toy company. Guest star John McGiver, co-starring Jan Merlin.
44	12	"The Machines Strike Back"	Nathan Juran	John and Ward Hawkins	December 12, 1965
Something has caused Admiral Nelson's new drone sub system to malfunction and fire missiles at New York City. Guest starring Roger C. Carmel.
45	13	"The Monster from Outer Space"	James Clark	William Read Woodfield & Allan Balter	December 19, 1965
An unmanned space probe returns to Earth with an alien hitchhiker, which one by one bends the crew of the Seaview to its will. No guest star.
46	14	"Terror on Dinosaur Island"	Leonard Horn	William Welch	December 26, 1965
Nelson and Chief Sharkey are trapped on an island populated by prehistoric creatures. Co-starring Paul Carr.
47	15	"Killers of the Deep"	Harry Harris	William Read Woodfield & Allan Balter	January 2, 1966
Captain Crane is captured and held prisoner on a submarine that has been stealing nuclear missiles. Guest star Michael Ansara, co-starring Patrick Wayne.
48	16	"Deadly Creature Below!"	Sobey Martin	William Read Woodfield & Allan Balter	January 9, 1966
The two men rescued by the Seaview are actually dangerous criminals. Guest star Nehemiah Persoff, co-starring Paul Comi.
49	17	"The Phantom Strikes"	Sobey Martin	William Welch	January 16, 1966
Captain Crane is the target of the captain of a sunken German U-boat. Guest star Alfred Ryder.
50	18	"The Sky's on Fire"	Gerald Mayer	S : Irwin Allen & Charles Bennett; T : William Welch	January 23, 1966
A disaster has struck the southern hemisphere and the Seaview may be the world's best hope for redemption, if only the scientists in charge can agree on the right course of action. Guest Star David J. Stewart, Co-starring Robert H. Harris, Frank Marth.
51	19	"Graveyard of Fear"	Justus Addiss	Robert Vincent Wright	January 30, 1966
The Seaview is on a mission to recover a sunken ships's secret cargo, but whatever sank the other ships in the area is now after the Seaview. Guest starring Robert Loggia.
52	20	"The Shape of Doom"	Nathan Juran	William Welch	February 6, 1966
The Seaview pursues an enormous whale which has swallowed a 50-megaton nuclear bomb. Guest star Kevin Hagen.
53	21	"Dead Man's Doubloons"	Sutton Roley	Sidney Marshall	February 13, 1966
The reincarnation of a dead pirate captain threatens the Seaview. Guest star Albert Salmi.
54	22	"The Death Ship"	Abner Biberman	Michael Lynn & George Reed	February 20, 1966
A guest crew of scientists is aboard the Seaview to test new automation technology, but one of them is a cold-blooded killer with ulterior motives. Guest star David Sheiner, co-starring Lew Gallo and Elizabeth Perry.
55	23	"The Monster's Web"	Justus Addiss	T : Al Gail; S/T : Peter Packer	February 27, 1966
The Seaview tangles with a giant, spider-like sea monster. Guest star Mark Richman
56	24	"The Menfish"	Tom Gries	William Read Woodfield & Allan Balter	March 6, 1966
Captain Crane must stop a scientist from creating human/marine animal hybrids. Guest star Gary Merrill, special guest star John Dehner.
57	25	"The Mechanical Man"	Sobey Martin	John and Ward Hawkins	March 13, 1966
An unstoppable android threatens the Seaview. Guest star James Darren, special guest star Arthur O'Connell.
58	26	"The Return of the Phantom"	Sutton Roley	William Welch	March 20, 1966
"The Phantom" Captain Kreuger returns, with Captain Crane's body as his target once again. Guest star Alfred Ryder, co-starring Vitina Marcus.

=== Season 3 (1966–67) ===
No. overall	No. in season	Title	Directed by	Written by	Original release date
59	1	"Monster from the Inferno"	Harry Harris	Rik Vollaerts	September 18, 1966
An intelligent organism from the bottom of the ocean is brought aboard the Seaview, but proves highly dangerous. Guest star Arthur Hill.
60	2	"Werewolf"	Justus Addiss	Donn Mullally	September 25, 1966
A scientist infected by lycanthropy in turn infects Admiral Nelson. Guest star Charles Aidman.
61	3	"The Day the World Ended"	Jerry Hopper	William Welch	October 2, 1966
The arrival of a new U.S. Senator on an inspection sets off a chain of events that causes everyone on Earth outside the Seaview to mysteriously vanish. Guest star Skip Homeier.
62	4	"Night of Terror"	Justus Addiss	Robert Bloomfield	October 9, 1966
The crew aboard the Seaview's diving bell become stranded on a mysterious tropical island. Guest star Henry Jones.
63	5	"The Terrible Toys"	Justus Addiss	Robert Vincent Wright	October 16, 1966
The toys in an old man's sack come to life and begin sabotaging the Seaview. Guest star Paul Fix. Last role for Francis X. Bushman.
64	6	"Day of Evil"	Jerry Hopper	William Welch	October 23, 1966
A shape-shifting alien boards and tries to take over the Seaview.
65	7	"Deadly Waters"	Gerald Mayer	Robert Vincent Wright	October 30, 1966
After rescuing Kowalski's brother, the Seaview is trapped on the ocean floor far below its crush limit. Guest star Don Gordon.
66	8	"Thing from Inner Space"	Alex March	William Welch	November 6, 1966
The Seaview investigates the mysterious deaths of a film crew on a remote island. Guest star Hugh Marlowe.
67	9	"The Death Watch"	Leonard Horn	William Welch	November 13, 1966
Nelson arrives on board the Seaview to find it totally abandoned except for Captain Crane and Chief Sharkey...supposedly on the admiral's orders. Only episode not to feature Lt. Cdr. Chip Morton (Bob Dowdell)
68	10	"Deadly Invasion"	Nathan Juran	John and Ward Hawkins	November 20, 1966
An alien impersonating Admiral Nelson's dead friend leads a force to capture the Seaview.
69	11	"The Haunted Submarine"	Harry Harris	William Welch	November 27, 1966
The Seaview is attacked by a 17th century warship. Richard Basehart has a dual role in this episode. In addition to his regular character of Admiral Nelson, Basehart also plays Captain Nelson.
70	12	"The Plant Man"	Harry Harris	Donn Mullally	December 4, 1966
Twin brothers are connected with an underwater plant creature - the one who created it and the other who wants to control it.
71	13	"The Lost Bomb"	Gerald Mayer	Oliver Crawford	December 11, 1966
A cargo plane carrying a top secret bomb is shot down, and the Seaview races to retrieve it before an enemy government can.
72	14	"The Brand of the Beast"	Justus Addiss	William Welch	December 18, 1966
The Seaview suffers engine failure, and while repairs are being made Admiral Nelson is affected by radiation.
73	15	"The Creature" "The Creature Returns"	Justus Addiss	John and Ward Hawkins	January 1, 1967
A seaweed humanoid creature captures Captain Crane.
74	16	"Death from the Past"	Justus Addiss	T : Sidney Marshall; S/T : Charles Bennett	January 8, 1967
The Seaview discovers a German submarine from World War II on the ocean floor, but its surviving crew members still believe the war is being fought. Guest star John van Dreelen.
75	17	"The Heat Monster"	Gerald Mayer	Charles Bennett	January 15, 1967
An alien intelligence invades the Seaview. Guest star Alfred Ryder.
76	18	"The Fossil Men"	Justus Addiss	James Whiton	January 22, 1967
The strange sounds from an undersea canyon may be connected with the destruction of a British fleet 200 years ago.
77	19	"The Mermaid"	Jerry Hopper	William Welch	January 29, 1967
After Captain Crane captures a real live mermaid, its mate seeks revenge. Guest star Diane Webber.
78	20	"The Mummy"	Harry Harris	William Welch	February 5, 1967
Transporting an Egyptian mummy proves to be anything but a routine task for the Seaview.
79	21	"Shadowman"	Justus Addiss	Rik Vollaerts	February 12, 1967
The Seaview and its skeleton crew are menaced by a strange object while attempting a space probe launch.
80	22	"No Escape from Death"	Harry Harris	William Welch	February 19, 1967
A mysterious submarine deliberately rams the Seaview, severely damaging it and sending it crashing to the bottom.
81	23	"Doomsday Island"	Jerry Hopper	Peter Germano	February 26, 1967
The Seaview discovers a strange egg on the ocean floor, but its hatching could spell disaster.
82	24	"The Wax Men"	Harmon Jones	William Welch	March 5, 1967
The crates that the Seaview has been ordered to transport supposedly contain ancient statues, but what are they really? Guest star Michael Dunn.
83	25	"Deadly Cloud"	Jerry Hopper	Rik Vollaerts	March 12, 1967
If the Seaview can't uncover the truth behind a cloud causing immense destruction, then the world is doomed.
84	26	"Destroy Seaview!"	Justus Addiss	Donn Mullally	March 19, 1967
Admiral Nelson is the only survivor of an expedition into an undersea cave to secure a new element.

=== Season 4 (1967–68) ===
No. overall	No. in season	Title	Directed by	Written by	Original release date
85	1	"Fires of Death"	Jerry Hopper	Arthur Weiss	September 17, 1967
The Seaview is sent to stop a volcano from erupting, but the scientist accompanying it has plans of his own. Guest Starring Victor Jory.
86	2	"The Deadly Dolls"	Harry Harris	Charles Bennett	October 1, 1967
Nelson and Crane are the only ones left to stop an evil puppeteer who has replaced the crew with his puppet duplicates. Guest Starring Vincent Price.
87	3	"Cave of the Dead"	Harry Harris	William Welch	October 8, 1967
While investigating the disappearance of four Navy ships, the Seaview comes across a mysterious island and dagger that may be somehow connected with the legend and curse of The Flying Dutchman. Guest Starring Warren Stevens.
88	4	"Journey with Fear"	Harry Harris	Arthur Weiss	October 15, 1967
Aliens kidnap Commander Morton, then Captain Crane, and now they're after the Seaview itself.
89	5	"Sealed Orders"	Jerry Hopper	William Welch	October 22, 1967
Leaking Neutron Bomb radiation causes Seaview crewmen to either hallucinate or completely vanish.
90	6	"Man of Many Faces"	Harry Harris	William Welch	October 29, 1967
A scientist is murdered on live TV, and the killer appears to be Admiral Nelson! It's now a game of "who's really who" as a master of disguise infiltrates the Seaview to disrupt a vital mission.
91	7	"Fatal Cargo"	Jerry Hopper	William Welch	November 5, 1967
A rare white ape brought aboard the Seaview is released and runs wild. Guest Starring Woodrow Parfrey.
92	8	"Time Lock"	Jerry Hopper	William Welch	November 12, 1967
A man from the future who collects military officers tries to add Admiral Nelson to his collection. Guest Starring John Crawford.
93	9	"Rescue"	Justus Addiss	William Welch	November 19, 1967
Captain Crane, while seeking an enemy craft in the Flying Sub, is attacked. Guest Starring Don Dubbins.
94	10	"Terror"	Jerry Hopper	Sidney Ellis	November 26, 1967
A shore party from Seaview encounters a dying scientist, who warns that deadly planet life threatens the Earth. Guest Starring Damian O'Flynn and Pat Culliton
95	11	"A Time to Die"	Robert Sparr	William Welch	December 3, 1967
The Seaview is cast back a million years in time by the mysterious Mr. Pem and Nelson has to play a deadly game with Pem to escape. Guest starring Henry Jones as Mr. Pem.
96	12	"Blow Up"	Justus Addiss	William Welch	December 10, 1967
Admiral Nelson starts behaving very oddly after using an experimental breathing apparatus.
97	13	"Deadly Amphibians"	Jerry Hopper	Arthur Weiss	December 17, 1967
Seaview is trapped on the ocean floor by malicious amphibian creatures. Guest Starring Don Matheson and Joey Tata.
98	14	"The Return of Blackbeard"	Justus Addiss	Al Gail	December 31, 1967
The ghost of Blackbeard appears, and attempts to seize the Seaview. Adding complications is that Nelson is trying to protect the US President, who is attending a diplomatic meeting. Guest Starring Malachi Throne.
99	15	"The Terrible Leprechaun"	Jerry Hopper	Charles Bennett	January 7, 1968
Two leprechauns, one good and one evil, appear on the Seaview. Guest Starring Walter Burke.
100	16	"The Lobster Man"	Justus Addiss	Al Gail	January 21, 1968
A lobster-like humanoid is found on the ocean floor. Guest Starring Victor Lundin.
101	17	"Nightmare"	TBA	TBA	January 28, 1968
Captain Crane returns from a trip in the Flying Sub to find the Seaview apparently abandoned. It soon transpires someone is putting him through a sinister test. Guest Starring Paul Mantee.
102	18	"The Abominable Snowman"	Robert Sparr	Robert Hamner	February 4, 1968
Visiting an experimental station in the Antarctic, the Seaview discovers the station is almost abandoned, and a strange white-furred creature is glimpsed.
103	19	"Secret of the Deep"	Charles Rondeau	William Welch	February 11, 1968
Seaview investigates a sea-lab surrounded by dangerous creatures. Guest Starring Peter Mark Richman.
104	20	"Man-Beast"	Jerry Hopper	William Welch	February 18, 1968
An experiment with an artificial diving-bell atmosphere has disturbing consequences. Guest Starring Lawrence Montaigne.
105	21	"Savage Jungle"	TBA	TBA	February 25, 1968
Mysterious jungle growths invade the submarine. Guest Starring Perry López.
106	22	"Flaming Ice"	Robert Sparr	Arthur Browne, Jr.	March 3, 1968
Seaview is under the ice cap, trying to investigate the cause of mysterious flooding. The malicious Frost Men are revealed as the culprits.
107	23	"Attack!"	Jerry Hopper	William Welch	March 10, 1968
The US Navy is attacked by a hostile UFO. Nelson is captured by the UFO's inhabitants. Guest starring Skip Homeier and Kevin Hagen.
108	24	"The Edge of Doom"	TBA	TBA	March 17, 1968
There is a treacherous impostor hiding among the Seaview's crew.
109	25	"The Death Clock"	Charles R. Rondeau	Sidney Marshall	March 24, 1968
The malevolent scientist Mallory creates an evil version of Captain Crane. Guest starring Chris Robinson as Mallory.
110	26	"No Way Back"	Robert Sparr	William Welch	March 31, 1968
The Seaview is destroyed in a mysterious explosion. A distraught Admiral Nelson encounters the time-travelling Mr. Pem. Nelson asks Pem to help him travel into the past to change history and save the Seaview. However, Pem has his own plans, and soon Nelson finds himself on the Seaview with the infamous Benedict Arnold. Guest starring Henry Jones as Mr. Pem and Barry Atwater as Benedict Arnold.

== Other media ==
- A paperback novel, City Under the Sea, authored by Paul W. Fairman, was published in 1965, to tie into the series. It had a different storyline than the episode of the same name. The book should also not be confused with the later Irwin Allen film of nearly the same name, which was about the attempts of the world's first under-sea city to prevent the earth from being hit by a rogue asteroid. It is not about "A wealthy family attempting to move the Earth's oceans to another planet for resettlement" as has occasionally been stated.
- Western Publishing began publishing a comic book based on the series in 1964 under their Gold Key Comics line. It ran 16 issues from December 1964 to April 1970. Most covers were painted by George Wilson, and most had a photo of either Richard Basehart or David Hedison on them. The first issue of the Gold Key comic was a story called "The Last Survivor". The story brought back Dr. Gamma, the villain from the pilot episode, "Eleven Days to Zero". Gold Key's story was the only sequel to the pilot episode. Hermes Press reprinted the entire run in 2 hardback volumes; the first was released in 2009.
- In 1966, World Distributors, a British publishing company in Manchester, England, published the first of two Voyage to the Bottom of the Sea Annuals, hardback gift books. The British-made books used the series' characters in all new stories but also contained a reprint of a story from the Gold Key Comics series. Both books were mostly prose stories with some illustrations.
- Aurora Plastics Corporation released a plastic model kit of Seaview as well as the Flying Sub during the original run of the series. From 1975 - 1977, Aurora reissued both kits; the Seaview (kit #253) was modified with a sea floor base (originally created for the Dick Tracy Space Coupe kit #819) and sub surface details, while The Flying Sub (kit #254) was remodeled in a different base color. The 1975 - 1977 kits—part of Aurora's reissue of 5 of their 11 TV & movie-related science-fiction kits, also included instruction sheets with a detailed history of the TV series or movie plot.
- Both kits were recently re-released by Polar Lights. The Flying Sub model sold more than the Seaview model.
- Other collectables from the show include a board game with illustrations based on the pilot episode, as well as a boxed card game with a painting of the divers' battle with the giant octopus, both from Milton Bradley, and a school lunch box with thermos from Aladdin with depictions of Admiral Nelson and Captain Crane trying to save the Flying Sub from an evil looking octopus. There was also a Sawyers View-Master slide reel based on the episode "Deadly Creature Below."
- In 1964, a 66-card set of black-and-white trading cards was released by Donruss. Selling for 5 cents a pack, the set consisted of stills from the first season. Today, a set in mint condition can sell for several hundred dollars.
- In the UK, TV Tornado published 14 issues that contained Voyage to the Bottom of the Sea stories, either comics or text with illustrations as per the issue and at least two TV Tornado annuals had original stories as well.
- Theodore Sturgeon wrote a novel, Voyage to the Bottom of the Sea, based on the original script written by Irwin Allen for the movie, and published in 1961.

== Popular culture ==
- The popularity of the TV show inspired Mad Magazine (March 1966) to spoof the show, their version being called Voyage to See What's on the Bottom, featuring a submarine called the Seapew and a flying sub called Son of Seapew.
- Australian TV show Fast Forward sent-up the series as Voyage to the Bottom of the Harbour.
- Stock footage of Seaview was used in the Wonder Woman episode "The Bermuda Triangle Crisis."
- An often referenced running joke is that in many episodes of the series, characters lurch to camera movements on the visibly static set, to give the illusion that Seaview had sustained impact. This was an old movie trick, and was commonly used by other television shows of the period, including Star Trek, but none did it so frequently, nor with such relish as Voyage. Hence, the technique is still commonly known as "Seaview Rock and Roll".
- On the SciFi Channel's 1995 documentary tribute to Irwin Allen, The Fantasy Worlds of Irwin Allen, series co-star June Lockhart recalled this technique being used also on Lost In Space, where the cast also knew it as "the rock-and-roll".
- The Disney Channel animated series Phineas and Ferb has an episode with a pun on the title called Voyage to the Bottom of Buford.

== Home media ==
20th Century Fox has released all 4 seasons on DVD in Region 1 in two volume sets.

In Region 2, Revelation Films has released the entire series on DVD in the UK in four complete season sets. On March 26, 2012, they released Voyage To The Bottom Of The Sea: The Complete Collection, a 31-disc set featuring all 110 episodes of the series as well as bonus features.

In Region 4, Madman Entertainment released the first two seasons on DVD in Australia on August 20, 2014.

DVD name	Ep #	Release date	Additional information
Season 1 Vol. 1	16	February 21, 2006	Unaired Color Pilot; Behind the scenes home movie from Irwin Allen; Promotional Reel featuring Irwin Allen from 1964; Still Gallery
Season 1 Vol. 2	16	July 11, 2006	Still Gallery (22 images); Blooper Reel; David Hedison Interviews
Season 2 Vol. 1	13	October 24, 2006	Special Effects Footage (22:04); Concept Art Gallery (5 stills); Episodic Photo Gallery (35 stills); Publicity Photo Gallery (8 stills)
Season 2 Vol. 2	13	February 20, 2007	David Hedison Interview; Still Gallery
Season 3 Vol. 1	13	June 19, 2007	Still Galleries; David Hedison Interviews; Visitors on Set; Letters from Fans; "The Rock and Roll"; David Hedison 1966 Interview (audio only)
Season 3 Vol. 2	13	October 23, 2007	Episodic Photo Gallery; Publicity Photos; TV Merchandise; David Hedison Interviews; Richard Basehart 1966 Interview (audio only)
Season 4 Vol. 1	13	March 31, 2009	Eleven Days to Zero (re-cut unaired pilot); David Hedison Interviews: Years 1–4; Irwin's Goal; Irwin's Office; Work Hours; Voice-overs; Still Gallery
Season 4 Vol. 2	13	January 11, 2011	Original Unaired Pilot; Broadcast Pilot with Vintage Commercials; Still Gallery

== See also ==
- List of underwater science fiction works
- SeaQuest DSV TV series
