= Warner Bros. Pictures =

American film studio

- Logo used since 2023

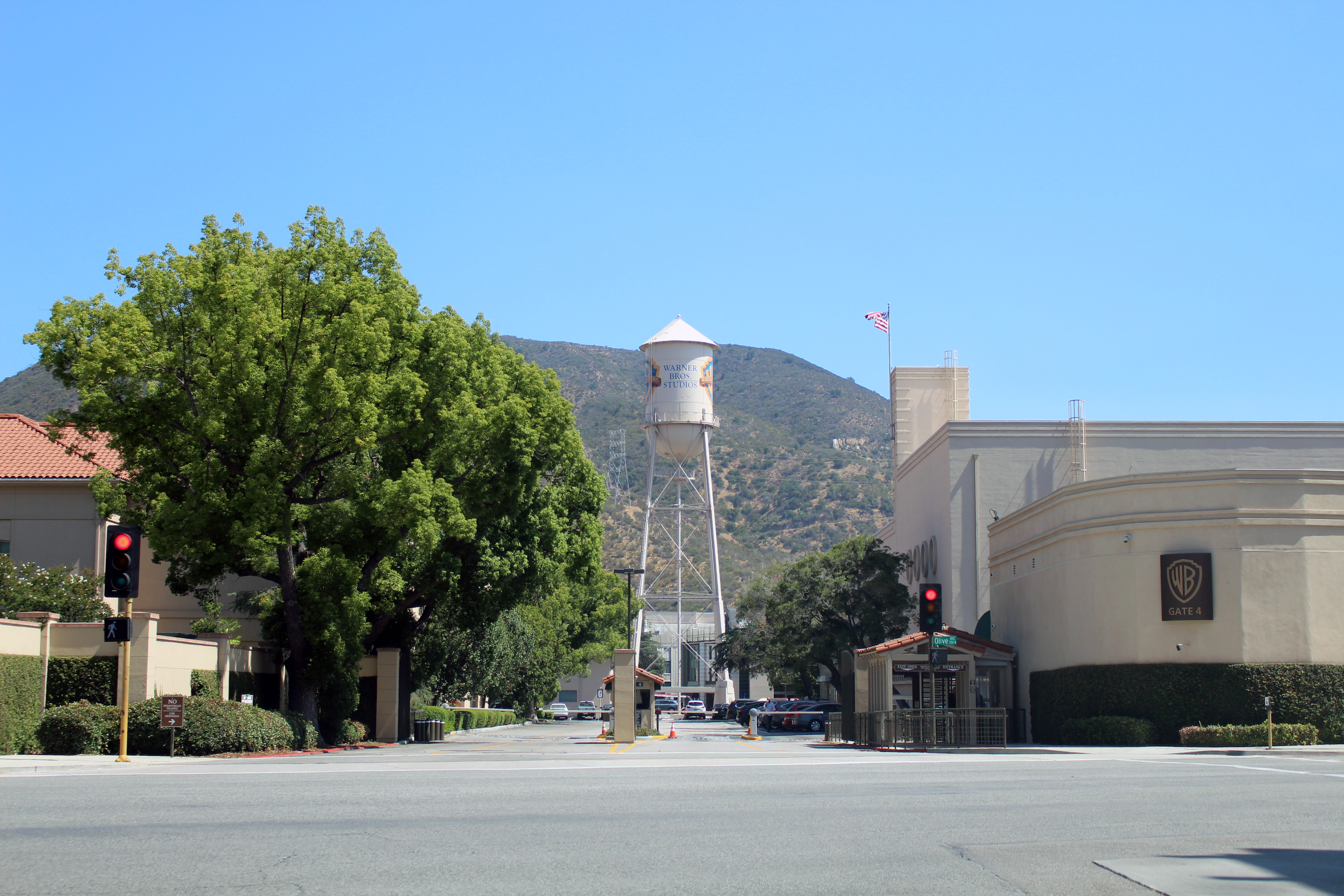
- Warner Bros. Studios lot, pictured on July 11, 2016, with the Warner Bros. Water Tower in the middle at 4000 Warner Boulevard in Burbank, California.
- Formerly: Warner Features Company (1910–1923); Warner Bros. Pictures, Inc. (1923–1967); Warner Bros. Productions, Inc. (1934–1937); Warner Bros.–First National Pictures, Inc. (1936–1958); Warner Bros.–Seven Arts, Inc. (1967–1969); Warner Bros., Inc. (1969–2003); Warner Bros., a division of Time Warner Entertainment Company, L.P. (1992–2003)
- Type: Division
- Industry: Film
- Predecessor: Warner Features Company; Leon Schlesinger Productions; First National Pictures; Vitagraph Company of America; Seven Arts Productions
- Founded: 1910; 116 years ago (as Warner Features Company) in New Castle, Pennsylvania, United States; April 4, 1923; 103 years ago (as Warner Bros. Pictures) in Los Angeles, California, United States
- Founders: Harry Warner; Albert Warner; Sam Warner; Jack L. Warner
- Headquarters: 4000 Warner Boulevard, Burbank, California, United States
- Area served: Worldwide
- Key people: Josh Greenstein and Dana Goldberg (co-chairpersons and CEOs, Skydance Motion Picture Group); Jesse Ehrman (president)
- Products: Motion pictures
- Services: Film distribution; Film promotion; Film production
- Owner: Skydance Motion Picture Group (Skydance)
- Parent: Warner Bros. Entertainment
- Divisions: Warner Bros. Pictures Animation
- Website: warnerbros.com/movies

Warner Bros. Pictures, also known as simply Warner Bros. and informally abbreviated as WBP, is an American film studio and distribution arm of Warner Bros. Entertainment. Headquartered at the Warner Bros. Studios complex in Burbank, California, it is the third oldest film studio in the United States still in operation, after Paramount and Universal Pictures, both founded in 1912 and is, along with its sister studio Paramount Pictures, one of the "Big Four" film studios. (Note: As Skydance)

Warner Bros. Pictures was founded on April 4, 1923, by the brothers Harry Warner, Albert Warner, Sam Warner, and Jack L. Warner. In addition to producing its own films, the studio handles filmmaking operations, theatrical distribution, marketing and promotion for films produced and released by other Warner Bros. labels.

Warner Bros. Pictures' most commercially successful film franchises include the Ocean's trilogy, Superman, Harry Potter, Batman, The Hobbit trilogy, The Matrix, Monsterverse, Mad Max, and Dune. Additionally, the studio's library includes many individual films such as Casablanca, The Searchers, Dirty Harry, The Exorcist, The Towering Inferno, The Shining, The Goonies, Goodfellas, Unforgiven, The Fugitive, Space Jam, 300, I Am Legend, Inception, Interstellar, American Sniper, It, Ready Player One, Barbie, and A Minecraft Movie, with five of the eleven films being nominated for the Academy Award for Best Picture, and all of them became among the highest grossing films of all time.

== History ==
=== Foundation, diversification and establishment (1910–1967) ===
The studio's predecessor (and the modern Warner Bros. media company and Warner Bros. Entertainment as a whole) was founded in 1910 as the Warner Features Company in New Castle, Pennsylvania, by filmmaker Sam Warner and his business partners and brothers, Harry Warner, Albert Warner, and Jack L. Warner. They produced their first film, the Peril of the Plains in 1912, which Sam directed for the St. Louis Motion Picture Company. In 1918, during World War I, the four Warner brothers produced an adaptation of the book My Four Years in Germany by James W. Gerard as their first full-scale picture, which was a box office hit and helped the brothers to establish themselves as a prestige studio.

On April 4, 1923, Warner Bros. Pictures, Inc. was officially established, as the brothers focused entirely on the motion picture industry. In 1927, Warner Bros. Pictures revolutionized the film industry by releasing its first sound film (or "talkie"), The Jazz Singer, starring Al Jolson.

In the aftermath of the 1948 antitrust suit, uncertain times led Warner Bros. to sell most of its pre-1950 films and cartoons to Associated Artists Productions (a.a.p.) in 1956. Two years later, a.a.p. was sold to United Artists (UA), which owned the company until 1981, when Metro-Goldwyn-Mayer (MGM) acquired UA.

=== Warner Bros.-Seven Arts (1967–1969) ===
In November 1966, Jack L. Warner acknowledged advancing age and changing times, selling 32% of control of the studio and music business to Seven Arts Productions for $32 million. (Seven Arts Productions was run by Canadian investors Elliot and Kenneth Hyman.) Eventually the company, including the studio, was renamed Warner Bros.-Seven Arts on July 14, 1967.

=== Kinney National/Warner Communications era (1969–1990) ===
Two years later the Hymans accepted a cash-and-stock offer from Kinney National Company for more than $64 million. In 1967, Kinney had previously acquired DC Comics (then officially known as National Periodical Publications), as well as a Hollywood talent agency, Ashley-Famous, whose founder Ted Ashley led Kinney head Steve Ross to purchase Warner Bros.

Ashley-Famous was soon spun off due to antitrust laws prohibiting the simultaneous ownership of a film studio and a talent agency. Ashley became the studio head and changed the name to Warner Bros., Inc. once again. Jack L. Warner was outraged by the Hymans's sale, and decided to move into independent production (most successfully with 1776 at Columbia). He retired in 1973 and eventually died from serious health complications of heart inflammation in September 1978.

The logo, designed by Saul Bass, was used from 1972 until 1984. It is currently used by the separately spun-off Warner Music Group.

Although movie audiences had shrunk, Warner's new management believed in the drawing power of stars, signing co-production deals with several of the biggest names of the day, including Paul Newman, Robert Redford, Barbra Streisand, and Clint Eastwood, carrying the studio successfully through the 1970s and 1980s. Its hits in the early 1970s included those starring the aforementioned actors, along with comedian Mel Brooks' Blazing Saddles, Stanley Kubrick's A Clockwork Orange, The Exorcist, John Boorman's Deliverance, and the Martin Scorsese productions Mean Streets and Alice Doesn't Live Here Anymore. Warner Bros. also made major profits on films and television shows built around the characters of Superman, Batman, Wonder Woman and The Flash owned by Warner Bros. subsidiary DC Comics. The 1970s also saw Warner Bros. Records become one of the major record labels worldwide, and that company gained sister labels in Elektra Records and Atlantic Records. In 1971, Filmation and Warner Bros. entered into an agreement to produce and distribute cartoons for film and television, with its television subsidiary handling worldwide television rights.

In late 1973, Warner Bros. announced that it had partnered with 20th Century Fox to co-produce a single film: producer Irwin Allen's The Towering Inferno. Both studios found themselves owning the rights to books about burning skyscrapers: Warner was attempting to adapt Thomas N. Scortia and Frank M. Robinson's The Glass Inferno and Fox was preparing an adaptation of Richard Martin Stern's The Tower. Allen insisted on a meeting with the heads of both studios and announced that as Fox was already in the lead with their property it would be preferable to lump the two together as a single film, with Fox owning domestic rights and Warner Bros. handling the film's foreign distribution. The resulting partnership resulted in the second-highest-grossing film of 1974, turning profits for both studios, and influencing future co-productions between major studios. Although Allen would make further films for Warner Bros., he would not repeat the success he had with The Towering Inferno.

Abandoning parking lots and funeral homes, the refocused Kinney renamed itself in honor of its best-known holding, Warner Communications. Throughout the 1970s and 1980s Warner Communications branched out into other business, such as video game company Atari, Inc. in 1976, and later the Six Flags theme parks.

In 1972, in a cost-cutting move, Warner Bros. and Columbia Pictures formed a third company called The Burbank Studios (TBS). They would share the Warner lot in Burbank. Both studios technically became production entities, giving TBS day-to-day responsibility for studio grounds and upkeep. The Columbia Ranch (about a mile north of Warner's lot) was part of the deal.

The Warner–Columbia relationship was acrimonious, but the reluctance of both studios to approve or spend money on capital upgrades that might only help the other did have the unintended consequence of preserving the Warner lot's primary function as a filmmaking facility while it produced relatively little during the 1970s and 1980s. One famous film that was filmed at the Warner lot during this era was Blade Runner (1982) by director Ridley Scott. Most films produced after 1968 were filmed on location after the failure of Camelot was partially attributed to the fact it was set in England but obviously filmed in Burbank. With control over its own lot tied up in TBS, Warner ultimately retained a significant portion of its backlot, while Fox sold its backlot to create Century City, Universal turned part of its backlot into a theme park and shopping center, and Disney replaced its backlot with office buildings and moved its animation department to an industrial park in Glendale.

In 1989, a solution to the situation became evident when Warner Bros. acquired Lorimar-Telepictures and gained control of the former MGM studio lot in Culver City, and that same year, Sony bought Columbia Pictures. Sony was flush with cash and Warner Bros. now had two studio lots. In 1990, TBS ended when Sony bought the MGM lot from Warner and moved Columbia to Culver City. However, Warner kept the Columbia Ranch, now known as the Warner Bros. Ranch.

Robert A. Daly joined Warner Bros. on December 1, 1980, taking over from Ted Ashley. His titles were chairman of the board and Co-Chief Executive Officer. One year later, he was named chairman of the board and chief executive officer and appointed Terry Semel President and Chief Operating Officer. Warner Bros. Animation was established on March 15, 1980.

=== As part of Time Warner/Time Warner Entertainment/AOL Time Warner/TimeWarner (1990–2018) ===
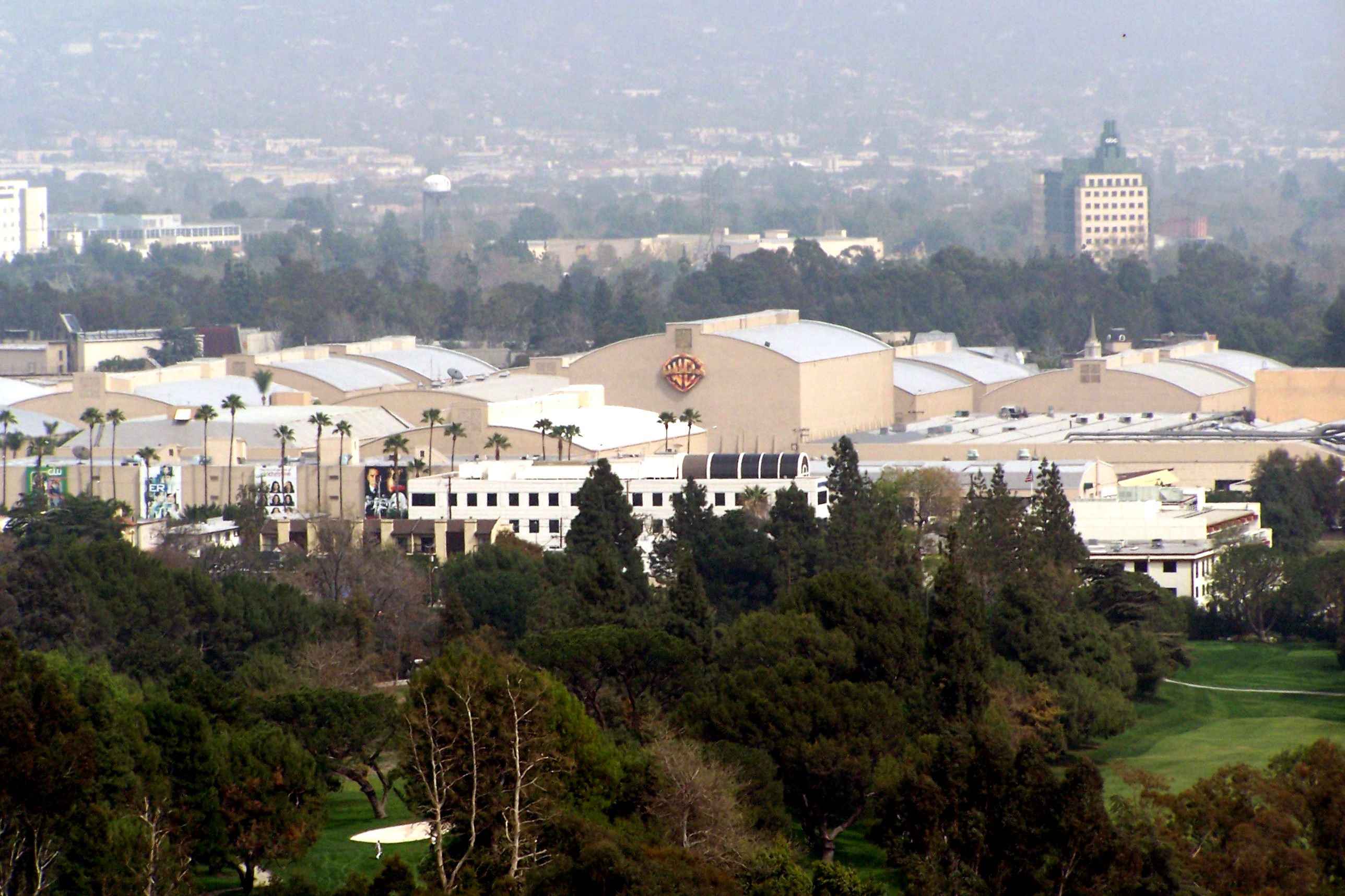
A panoramic view over studio premises in 2007

Warner Bros. Pictures logo and wordmark used from 1993 to 2020. This logo was used as the on-screen logo of the studio from 1984 to 2022.

Warner Communications merged on January 10, 1990 with white-shoe publishing company Time Inc. Time claimed a higher level of prestige, while Warner Bros. provided the profits. The Time-Warner merger was almost derailed when Paramount Communications (formerly Gulf+Western, later sold to the first incarnation of Viacom), launched a $12.2 billion hostile takeover bid for Time Inc., forcing Time to acquire Warner with a $14.9 billion cash/stock offer. Paramount responded with a lawsuit filed in Delaware court to break up the merger. Paramount lost and the merger proceeded. Time Warner formed Time Warner Entertainment in June 1992 by merging its entertainment operations for the first time.

In 1993, Warner Bros. Family Entertainment was established to produce various family-oriented films, plus animated films. The Family Entertainment label was made dormant in 2011. In 1994, Jon Peters, whose Peters Entertainment company had a non-exclusive deal at Sony Pictures, received another non-exclusive, financing deal at Warner Bros., citing that then president Terry Samel and producer Peters were friends.

In 1995, Warner Bros. and television station owner Tribune Company of Chicago launched The WB Television Network, seeking a large share of the niche market of teenage viewers. The WB's early programming included an abundance of teenage fare, such as Buffy the Vampire Slayer, Smallville, Dawson's Creek and One Tree Hill. Two dramas produced by Spelling Television, 7th Heaven and Charmed, helped bring The WB into the spotlight. Charmed lasted eight seasons, becoming the longest-running drama with female leads. 7th Heaven ran for eleven seasons and was the longest-running family drama and longest-running show for the network. In 2006, Warner Bros. and CBS Corporation decided to close The WB and CBS's UPN and jointly launch The CW Television Network.

On October 10, 1996, Time Warner acquired Turner Broadcasting System, which allowed Warner Bros. to regain the rights to their pre-1950 film library. The Turner deal also brought two separate film companies, New Line Cinema and Castle Rock Entertainment, both of which were eventually integrated into Warner Bros. Entertainment, formed on December 3, 2002. The Turner deal also gave Time Warner access to Metro-Goldwyn-Mayer (MGM)'s pre-May 1986 library and the pre-1991 libraries of animation studios Hanna-Barbera and Ruby-Spears. The merger brought projects such as City of Angels and You've Got Mail into the studio. Later that year, Warner Bros. partnered with PolyGram Filmed Entertainment to distribute various movies produced by Castle Rock Entertainment.

Also that same year, Bruce Berman left Warner Bros. to begin Plan B Entertainment, then he subsequently headed Village Roadshow Pictures with a deal at the studio.

In 1998, Time Warner Entertainment sold Six Flags to Premier Parks. The takeover of Time Warner Entertainment in 2001 by then-high-flying America Online (AOL) did not prove a good match, and following the collapse in "dot-com" stocks, the AOL element was banished from the corporate name.

In 1998, Warner Bros. celebrated its 75th anniversary. In 1999, Terry Semel and Robert Daly resigned as studio heads after a career with 13 Oscar-nominated films. Daly and Semel were said to have popularized the modern model of partner financing and profit sharing for film production. In mid-1999, Alan F. Horn and Barry Meyer replaced Daly and Semel as new studio heads, in which the studio had continued success in movies, television shows, cartoons, that the previous studio heads had for the studio. In late 2003, Time Warner reorganized Warner Bros.'s assets under Warner Bros. Entertainment Inc., in an effort to distinguish the film studio from its then-sister record label (which since became Warner Records in May 2019) and Warner Music Group.

The studio division was incorporated as Warner Bros. Pictures on March 3, 2003, to diversify film subjects and expand audiences for their film releases. The company became part of the Warner Bros. Pictures Group, which was established in 2008, and Jeff Robinov was appointed the first president of the company.

In the late 1990s, Warner Bros. obtained rights to the Harry Potter novels and released feature film adaptations of the first in November 2001. Subsequently, they released the second film in November 2002, the third in June 2004, the fourth in November 2005, the fifth in July 2007, and the sixth in July 2009. The seventh (and at that time, final) book was released as two movies; Deathly Hallows — Part 1 in November 2010 and Deathly Hallows — Part 2 in July 2011.

From 2006, Warner Bros. operated a joint venture with China Film Group Corporation and HG to form Warner China Film HG to produce films in Hong Kong and China, including Connected, a remake of the 2004 thriller film Cellular.

Warner Bros. played a large part in the discontinuation of the HD DVD format. On January 4, 2008, Warner Bros. announced that they would drop support of HD DVD in favor of Blu-ray Disc. HD DVDs continued to be released through May 2008, but only following Blu-ray and DVD releases.

Warner Bros.'s Harry Potter film series was the worldwide highest-grossing film series of all time without adjusting for inflation. Its Batman film series was one of only two series to have two entries earn more than $1 billion worldwide. Harry Potter and the Deathly Hallows – Part 2 was Warner Bros.' highest-grossing movie ever (surpassing The Dark Knight). However, the Harry Potter movies have produced a net loss due to Hollywood accounting. IMAX Corp. signed with Warner Bros. Pictures in April 2010 to release as many as 20 giant-format films through 2013.

In May 2011, Warner Bros. Home Entertainment Group acquired Flixster, a movie discovery application company. The acquisition also includes Rotten Tomatoes, a movie review aggregator.

On March 6, 2013, Time Warner announced plans to spin off Time Inc. into a publicly traded company. Time Warner's chairman/CEO Jeff Bewkes said that the split would allow Time Warner to focus entirely on its television and film businesses, and Time Inc. to focus on its core print media businesses. It was announced in May 2014 that Time Inc. would become a publicly traded company on June 6 of that year. The spin-off was completed on June 9, 2014.

On October 21, 2014, Warner Bros. created a short form digital unit, Blue Ribbon Content, under Warner Bros. Animation and Warner Digital Series president Sam Register. Warner Bros. Digital Networks announced its acquisition of online video company Machinima, Inc. on November 17, 2016.

As of 2015, Warner Bros. is one of only three studios to have released a pair of billion-dollar films in the same year (along with Walt Disney Studios Motion Pictures and Universal Studios); the distinction was achieved in 2012 with The Dark Knight Rises and The Hobbit: An Unexpected Journey. As of 2016, it is the only studio to cross $1 billion at the domestic box office every year since 2000.

In 2017, longtime New Line executive Toby Emmerich joined as President of Warner Bros. Pictures Group. In January 2018, he was promoted to chairman. On October 23, 2018, it was announced that Lynne Frank, President of Warner Bros. Pictures Group, would be leaving the company to pursue new opportunities. In June 2019, Warner Bros. Pictures signed an agreement with SF Studios to have their films distributed in Sweden, Denmark, Norway, and Finland.

=== As part of AT&T/WarnerMedia (2018–2022) ===
In June 2018, Warner Bros. parent company Time Warner was acquired by U.S. telecom company AT&T, and renamed WarnerMedia, the former Time Inc. properties having been sold off to new owners. On October 16, 2018, WarnerMedia shut down DramaFever, affecting 20% of Warner Bros.' digital networks staff.

On March 4, 2019, WarnerMedia announced a planned reorganization that would break-up the Turner Broadcasting System by moving Cartoon Network, Adult Swim, Boomerang, their respective production studios (Cartoon Network Studios and Williams Street), as well as Turner Classic Movies and Otter Media, directly under Warner Bros. (Turner's remaining television services and joint ventures would be divided into WarnerMedia Entertainment and WarnerMedia News & Sports respectively). Aside from Otter Media, these assets operate under a newly formed Global Kids & Young Adults division, renamed on April 7, 2020, to Warner Bros. Global Kids, Young Adults and Classics. On May 31, 2019, Otter Media was transferred from Warner Bros. to WarnerMedia Entertainment to oversee the development of HBO Max, a new streaming service that would feature content from HBO and WarnerMedia brands. Tom Ascheim resigned as president of cable network Freeform to become the president of the Global Kids, Young Adults, and Classics division on July 1, 2020, until May 11, 2022, when Michael Ouweleen took over as the current president of The Cartoon Network, Inc.

These are the two versions of Pentagram's 2019 Warner Bros. shield logo, which were used from 2019 to 2023. One is the regular logo on the left, and the other is the "dimensional" version on the right.

On November 13, 2019, Warner Bros. unveiled an updated iteration of its shield logo by Pentagram in anticipation of the company's upcoming centennial, which features a streamlined appearance designed to make it better-suited for multi-platform usage and iterations. The company also commissioned a new corporate typeface that is modeled upon the "WB" lettering.

Warner Bros. and HBO Max announced the Warner Max film label on February 5, 2020, which was to produce eight-to-ten mid-budget movies per year for the streaming service starting in 2020. However, the label was ultimately discontinued in October 2020 as part of a consolidation of the Warner Bros. Pictures group.

==== COVID-19 pandemic (2020–2022) ====
Like most other film distributors, Warner Bros. Pictures struggled with releasing films during the 2020 COVID-19 pandemic because of restrictions on opening theaters. After postponing several films planned for 2020 into 2021, Warner Bros. announced in December 2020 that they would take an unusual approach: planning their full slate of 2021 films for both theatrical release and simultaneous one-month availability on the HBO Max streaming service. This approach was similar to the studio's release of Wonder Woman 1984 that month.

After one month, these films would still be shown in theaters and would later become available via home media on typical release schedules. The inclusion of streaming, dubbed "Project Popcorn", was criticized by production companies, directors, and actors. The criticism arose because Warner Bros. Pictures announced the streaming plan without informing these groups in advance, and because of concerns about lower payouts due to streaming options. These criticisms led Warner Bros. Pictures to alter compensation rates for the affected films by January 2021, in order to provide larger payouts to their casts and crews.

In March 2021, Warner Bros. announced that they would discontinue the model of same-day HBO Max and theatrical release in 2022; instead, they would use a 45-day theatrical exclusivity window. This change is part of an agreement the studio reached with Cineworld (who operates Regal Cinemas).

In February 2022, Village Roadshow Pictures, a co-financier of The Matrix Resurrections, began a lawsuit against Warner Bros. over the hybrid release of the sci-fi sequel. Like all of Warner Bros.' 2021 films, the fourth Matrix film was given a simultaneous release on both HBO Max and in theaters due to the COVID-19 pandemic. According to a complaint filed by Village Roadshow, the decision ruined any December box office hopes. In May of that same year, Village Roadshow agreed to arbitration with Warner Bros. over the release of The Matrix Resurrections.

=== As part of Warner Bros. Discovery (2022–2026) ===
Alternate version of the 2023 Warner Bros. Pictures logo without the banner, used as the on-screen variant in only a few films, most recently Coyote vs. Acme in 2026. Although the late-2023 on-screen logo has been used since December 6, 2023, this logo remains in use for corporate and small-scale purposes. It is also the official current logo of Warner Bros. Pictures' parent company, Warner Bros. Entertainment and its former parent company, Warner Bros. Discovery.

On April 8, 2022, AT&T divested WarnerMedia to its shareholders, which in turn merged with Discovery Inc. to form Warner Bros. Discovery. The new company is led by Discovery's CEO David Zaslav.

Warner Bros. Discovery (WBD) is the legal successor to the company formerly known as Discovery, Inc. before its acquisition of WarnerMedia in April 2022. On June 1, 2022, WBD announced several changes:

- Toby Emmerich would step down as head of the Warner Bros. Pictures Group after a transition period.
- The company would be divided into three units: Warner Bros. Pictures/New Line Cinema, DC Films, and Warner Animation Group.
- Former MGM executives Michael De Luca and Pamela Abdy would serve as co-chairs of Warner Bros. Pictures. They would also temporarily oversee the other two divisions until new executives were hired.
- Emmerich would start his own production company; he would also enter into a five-year distribution and funding agreement with Warner Bros. Pictures.

On June 8, COO Carolyn Blackwood announced that she was stepping down as well.

Steve Spira returned as president of business affairs for Warner Bros. in June 2022; De Luca and Abdy took over from Emmerich in July 2022. Former president Alan Horn was appointed as a consultant for WBD President David Zaslav, working with De Luca and Abdy.

In August 2022, Warner Bros. Pictures entered into a multi-year contract to distribute MGM films outside the United States, including on home entertainment. This contract included joint participation by both companies in marketing, advertising, publicity, film distribution, and relationship with exhibitors for future MGM titles. That same month, the studio's plans for film distribution were revised, with increased reliance on theatrical releases rather than releases on HBO Max only.

Walter Hamada, the president of DC Films, stepped down on October 19, 2022. President of Production & Development Courtenay Valenti departed on October 28 and was replaced by Jesse Ehrman. On June 9, 2023, the Warner Bros. Pictures Group was renamed as the Warner Bros. Motion Picture Group.

In March 2022, Warner Bros. soft launched a campaign for its centennial in 2023, with the tagline "100 Years of Storytelling". In December 2022, the centennial campaign was launched with the new tagline "Celebrating Every Story", which will include commemorative initiatives across all Warner Bros. divisions and properties. The campaign utilizes a commemorative logo featuring an updated shield by Chermayeff & Geismar & Haviv (first introduced in the Warner Bros. Discovery logo), which was revised with a softer appearance, thicker outlines, and a return to using blue and gold as its corporate colors (if not rendered in different colors or textures to suit a specific property). The updated shield is used as a secondary logo, and is used concurrently with the 2019 logo (which is the main and primary logo) since May 2023. As part of the 100th anniversary campaign, the studio released new short features for the Max streaming service that recreates Warner Bros. classics with a focus on diversity. In November 2022, James Gunn and Peter Safran became the co-chairpersons and CEOs of DC Films, which was renamed to DC Studios. The studio also become an independent division of Warner Bros. Discovery.

=== As part of Skydance Corporation (from 2026) ===
In 2025, Paramount Skydance made an unsolicited bid to acquire Warner Bros. Discovery. After refusing the initial offer Warner Bros. Discovery began evaluating strategic alternatives to a previously planned corporate split. Ultimately, Paramount Skydance, Netflix, and Comcast each submitted bids in November 2025 to acquire all or part of the company.

In December 2025, Warner Bros. Discovery announced that it decided to sell its studio and streaming assets to Netflix for $82.7 billion. The acquisition was expected to be completed after the previously announced separation of WBD's Global Networks division, Discovery Global, into a new publicly traded company in the third quarter of 2026.

On February 23, 2026, Paramount's insiders told Variety that Paramount's revised offer for all of Warner Bros. Discovery would likely come in at $32 per share. The following day, Warner Bros. Discovery confirmed it had a received a revised offer from Paramount and would be reviewing it in consultation with their financial and legal advisors. On February 26, 2026, Warner Bros. Discovery confirmed that it considered Paramount's updated bid to be superior to Netflix's current offer, triggering a four-business-day period during which Netflix could improve its offer. Netflix subsequently declined to increase its bid, stating that the deal was "no longer financially attractive." On February 27, Paramount Skydance's revised bid was revealed to be worth $110 billion. In discussions with lawmakers, Paramount Skydance committed to keeping the two historic studios separate and said the merged company is committed to producing a minimum of 15 theatrical films per studio per year.

On October 2, 2026, it was announced that co-chairs and CEOs Pamela Abdy and Michael De Luca would be exiting Warner Bros. after the close of the Paramount and Warner Bros. merger. The merger closed on October 6, 2026, and Paramount Skydance was renamed Skydance. A month later, Skydance Motion Picture Group announced that Jesse Ehrman would run Warner Bros.

== International arrangements ==
=== Film production ===
==== Germany ====
In 1995, Willi Geike was appointed as marketing director for Warner's operations in Germany. Around the same time, the studio began self-producing and distributing German films, starting with Dangerous Dowry.

During Geike's tenue, the studio achieved various successes with Its German-language features such as the animated films such as The Little Polar Bear and Laura's Star and the live-action releases such as Rabbit Without Ears, Men in the City and SMS für Dich, as well with establishing partnerships with filmmakers such as Thilo Graf Rothkirch, Til Schweiger, Matthias Schweighöfer, Caroline Link, Simon Verhoeven and Karoline Herfurth. In 2021, Willi Geike left Warner Bros. after 38 years.

==== Netherlands ====
In 1997, Warner Bros. signed an agreement with children's television producer Burny Bos and his production company BosBros. for the Benelux distribution rights of his films starting with The Flying Liftboy, an adventure film based on the children's book by Annie M.G. Schmidt. The film became the most-visited Dutch film of 1998, which led to a partnership where Warner distributed films from the company such as Miss Minoes, Tow Truck Pluck and Winky's Horse. BosBros. ended the partnership in 2011.

==== Japan ====
On July 14, 1998, Toshiba, Warner Bros. and Nippon Television launched production joint venture TOWANI Corp with the goal to produce two Japanese films per year starting with Sakuya: Slayer of Demons on August 12, 2000. However, after producing four features, the company filed for bankruptcy after the box office failure of Cutie Honey on May 29, 2004.

==== India ====
In 2025, Warner Bros. Pictures signed a five-film agreement with Bhanushali Studios Limited and JOAT Films to co-create adaptations of Warner Bros. titles for the Indian market.

=== Film distribution ===
From 1971 until the end of 1987, Warner Bros.' international distribution operations were a joint venture with Columbia Pictures. In some countries, this joint venture distributed films from other companies (such as EMI Films and Cannon Films in the United Kingdom). Warner Bros. ended the venture in 1988.

On May 4, 1987, The Walt Disney Company signed a theatrical distribution agreement with Warner Bros. International for the release of Disney and Touchstone films in overseas markets, with Disney retaining full control of all distribution and marketing decisions on their product. In 1992, Disney opted to end their joint venture with Warner Bros. to start autonomously distributing their films in the aforementioned markets.

In 2001, Warner Bros. began a partnership with German production company X Filme Creative Pool and its distribution arm X Verleih AG, were they would co-distribute their releases with the studio. The partnership was later extended in 2004 with 20 additional features.

Before the 2008 merger, Warner Bros. already handled distribution of then-sister company's New Line Cinema titles in Germany, Austria, Switzerland, Eastern Europe, Russia and select territories in Latin America and Asia.

From 2011 to 2023, Warner Bros. handled theatrical distribution of Sony Pictures Releasing films in Italy. Since then, Eagle Pictures, which was already distributing Sony's films on home video in the country, took over theatrical distribution as well. On February 6, 2014, Columbia TriStar Warner Filmes de Portugal Ltda., a joint venture with Sony Pictures which distributed both companies' films in Portugal, announced that it would close its doors on March 31, 2014. NOS Audiovisuais handles distribution of Warner Bros. films in Portugal since then, while the distribution duties for Sony Pictures films in the country were taken over by Big Picture Films.

Before Disney's acquisition of 21st Century Fox in 2019, Warner Bros. and 20th Century Fox had a strategic partnership to distribute both of their films theatrically in key territories in Southeast Asia and the Benelux. The earliest known joint venture of the two companies was established in 1970 in Singapore. In the Benelux, Warner distributed Fox titles in the Netherlands while Fox handled distribution of Warner Bros. titles in Belgium from 2008 until 2019.

Since January 1, 2021, Warner Bros. films are distributed through Universal Pictures in Hong Kong, Mexico, Australia and New Zealand citing WarnerMedia's closure of its Hong Kong theatrical office starting with The Batman. As of 2024, Warner Bros. currently handles theatrical distribution of Universal Pictures films in Brazil, India and the Philippines.

In August 2022, Warner Bros. Pictures entered into a multi-year deal for distributing MGM (later Amazon MGM Studios) films outside the United States, including on home entertainment. The contract included joint participation of both companies for marketing, advertising, publicity, film distribution, and relationship with exhibitors for future MGM titles. The deal was concluded in 2025 when Sony Pictures Releasing International took over international distribution of Amazon MGM titles beginning with After the Hunt.

As of 2025, Warner Bros. had partnerships with local distribution companies to theatrically release local language and regionally acquired films such as Singapore-based Encore Films in Southeast Asia and India, Picturehouse Entertainment (unrelated to the previous sister studio of the same name) in the United Kingdom and PiperFilm in Italy.

On September 17, 2025, Warner Bros. Pictures signed a theatrical distribution deal with Toho-Towa for Japan that would take effect the following year with Wuthering Heights. Warner Bros.' local distribution arm dissolved on December 31, 2025, but continued to handle distribution for its 2026 slate of local productions.

== Film library ==
Mergers and acquisitions have helped Warner Bros. to accumulate a diverse collection of films, cartoons and television programs. As of 2022, Warner Bros. owned more than 145,000 hours of programming, including 12,500 feature films and 2,400 television programs comprising more than 150,000 individual episodes.

=== Acquired libraries ===
Mergers and acquisitions have helped Warner Bros. accumulate a diverse collection of films, cartoons and television programs. As of 2022, Warner Bros. owned more than 145,000 hours of programming, including 12,500 feature films and 2,400 television programs comprising more than tens of thousands of individual episodes.

In the aftermath of the 1948 antitrust suit, uncertain times led Warner Bros. in 1956 to sell most of its pre-1950 films and cartoons to Associated Artists Productions (a.a.p.). In addition, a.a.p. also obtained the Fleischer Studios and Famous Studios Popeye cartoons, originally from Paramount Pictures. Two years later, a.a.p. was sold to United Artists (UA), which owned the company until 1981, when Metro-Goldwyn-Mayer (MGM) acquired United Artists.

In 1982, during their independent years, Turner Broadcasting System acquired Brut Productions, the film production arm of France-based then-struggling personal-care company Faberge Inc.

In 1986, Turner Broadcasting System acquired MGM. Finding itself in debt, Turner Entertainment kept the pre-May 1986 MGM film and television libraries and a small portion of the United Artists library (including the a.a.p. library and North American rights to the RKO Radio Pictures library) while spinning off the rest of MGM.

In 1989, Warner Communications acquired Lorimar-Telepictures Corporation. Lorimar's catalogue included the post-1974 library of Rankin/Bass Productions, and the post-1947 library of Monogram Pictures/Allied Artists Pictures Corporation.

In 1991, Turner Broadcasting System acquired animation studio Hanna-Barbera and the Ruby-Spears library from Great American Broadcasting, and years later, Turner Broadcasting System acquired Castle Rock Entertainment on December 22, 1993, and New Line Cinema on January 28, 1994. On October 10, 1996, Time Warner acquired Turner Broadcasting System, thus bringing Warner Bros.' pre-1950 library back home to the studio after 46 years. In addition, Warner Bros. owns pre-2010 libraries produced by Castle Rock Entertainment with few exceptions.

In 2008, Time Warner integrated New Line Cinema into Warner Bros. Pictures.

=== The Warner Bros. Archives ===
The University of Southern California Warner Bros. Archives is the largest single studio collection in the world. Donated in 1977 to USC's School of Cinema-Television by Warner Communications, the WBA houses departmental records that detail Warner Bros. activities from the studio's first major feature, My Four Years in Germany (1918), to its sale to Seven Arts in 1968. It presents a complete view of the production process during the Golden Age of Hollywood. UA donated pre-1950 Warner Bros. nitrate negatives to the Library of Congress and post-1951 negatives to the UCLA Film and Television Archive. Most of the company's legal files, scripts, and production materials were donated to the Wisconsin Center for Film and Theater Research.

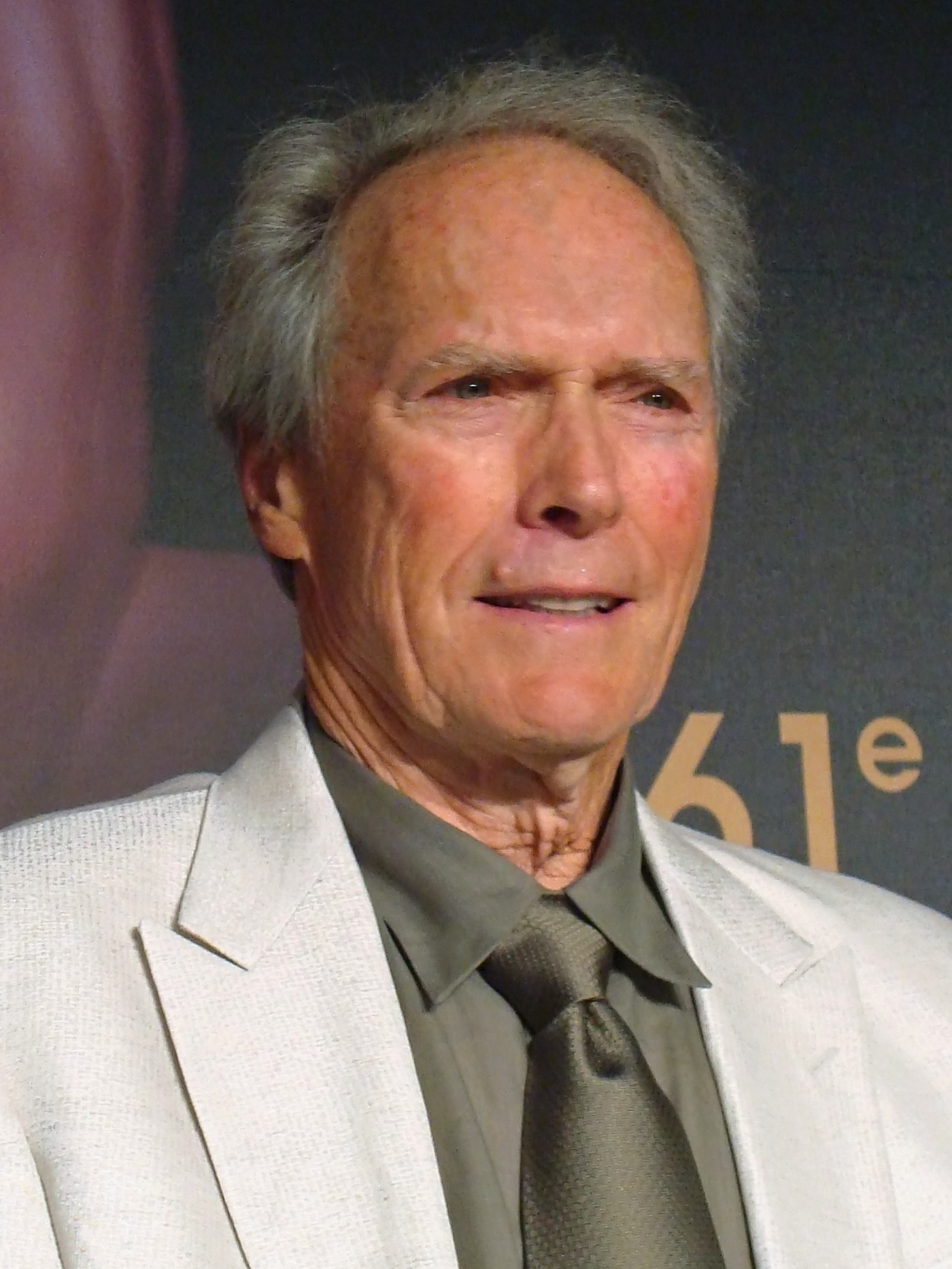
Clint Eastwood's relationship with Warner Bros. began in 1971, and he has directed several of the studios best known films, including Unforgiven (1992) and Million Dollar Baby (2004).

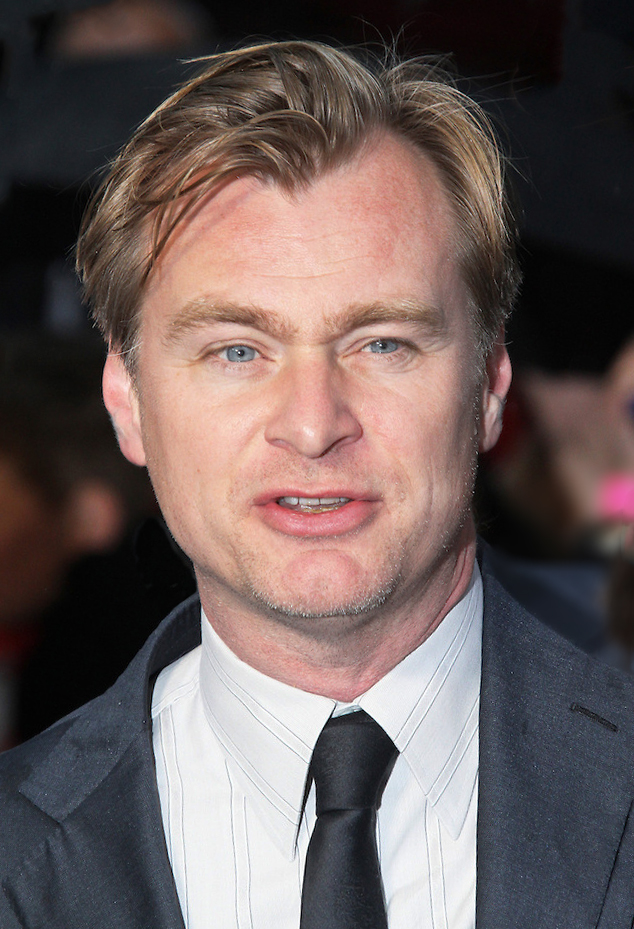
Christopher Nolan wrote and directed several of Warner Bros.'s most profitable films in the early 21st century. Like Eastwood, Nolan has had a long creative partnership with the studio.

=== Highest-grossing films ===
† Indicates films currently in theatrical release in the week commencing 20 November 2026.

Highest-grossing films in North America
Rank	Title	Year	Gross
1	Barbie	2023	$637,332,531
2	The Dark Knight ‡	2008	$534,987,076
3	The Dark Knight Rises	2012	$448,149,584
4	A Minecraft Movie	2025	$424,087,780
5	Wonder Woman	2017	$412,845,172
6	Harry Potter and the Deathly Hallows – Part 2	2011	$381,447,587
7	The Batman	2022	$369,345,583
8	Superman	2025	$354,223,803
9	American Sniper	2014	$350,159,020
10	Joker	2019	$335,477,657
11	Aquaman	2018	$335,104,314
12	Batman v Superman: Dawn of Justice	2016	$330,360,194
13	It	2017	$328,874,981
14	Suicide Squad	2016	$325,100,054
15	Harry Potter and the Sorcerer's Stone ‡	2001	$317,871,467
16	The Hobbit: An Unexpected Journey ^{1}	2012	$303,030,651
17	Harry Potter and the Half-Blood Prince	2009	$302,334,374
18	Harry Potter and the Deathly Hallows – Part 1	2010	$296,374,621
19	Beetlejuice Beetlejuice	2024	$294,100,435
20	Inception	2010	$292,587,330
21	Harry Potter and the Order of the Phoenix	2007	$292,382,727
22	Man of Steel	2013	$291,045,518
23	Harry Potter and the Goblet of Fire	2005	$290,469,928
24	Dune: Part Two	2024	$282,144,358
25	The Matrix Reloaded	2003	$281,576,461

Highest-grossing films worldwide
Rank	Title	Year	Gross
1	Barbie	2023	$1,448,232,531
2	Harry Potter and the Deathly Hallows – Part 2	2011	$1,342,359,942
3	Aquaman	2018	$1,148,528,393
4	The Dark Knight Rises	2012	$1,081,153,097
5	Joker	2019	$1,074,445,730
6	Harry Potter and the Deathly Hallows – Part 1 ‡	2010	$1,060,877,849
7	Harry Potter and the Philosopher's Stone ‡	2001	$1,034,720,602
8	The Hobbit: An Unexpected Journey ^{1}	2012	$1,017,030,651
9	Harry Potter and the Half-Blood Prince ‡	2009	$1,008,354,450
10	The Dark Knight ‡	2008	$1,008,294,632
11	A Minecraft Movie	2025	$961,187,780
12	The Hobbit: The Desolation of Smaug ^{1}	2013	$959,027,992
13	The Hobbit: The Battle of the Five Armies ^{1}	2014	$956,019,788
14	Harry Potter and the Order of the Phoenix	2007	$942,201,710
15	Harry Potter and the Goblet of Fire	2005	$896,730,264
16	Harry Potter and the Chamber of Secrets	2002	$879,793,867
17	Batman v Superman: Dawn of Justice	2016	$873,637,528
18	Inception	2010	$836,848,102
19	Wonder Woman	2017	$822,854,286
20	Fantastic Beasts and Where to Find Them	2016	$814,037,575
21	Harry Potter and the Prisoner of Azkaban	2004	$796,907,323
22	The Batman	2022	$770,962,583
23	Interstellar ‡	2014	$758,690,230
24	Suicide Squad	2016	$746,846,894
25	The Matrix Reloaded	2003	$741,847,937

‡ — Includes theatrical reissue(s)

== See also ==
- Warner Bros. Studios, Burbank
- Warner Bros. Studio Tour Hollywood
- Warner Bros. Home Entertainment
- Warner Bros. Family Entertainment
- Warner Bros. Television Studios
- Warner Bros. Discovery Global Experiences
- List of Warner Bros. short subjects
- Warner Bros. Animation
- Warner Bros. Studios, Leavesden

== Notes ==
1. co-owned by New Line Cinema and Metro-Goldwyn-Mayer Pictures (the film's producers)
