= Carl Kress (film editor) =

American film and sound editor

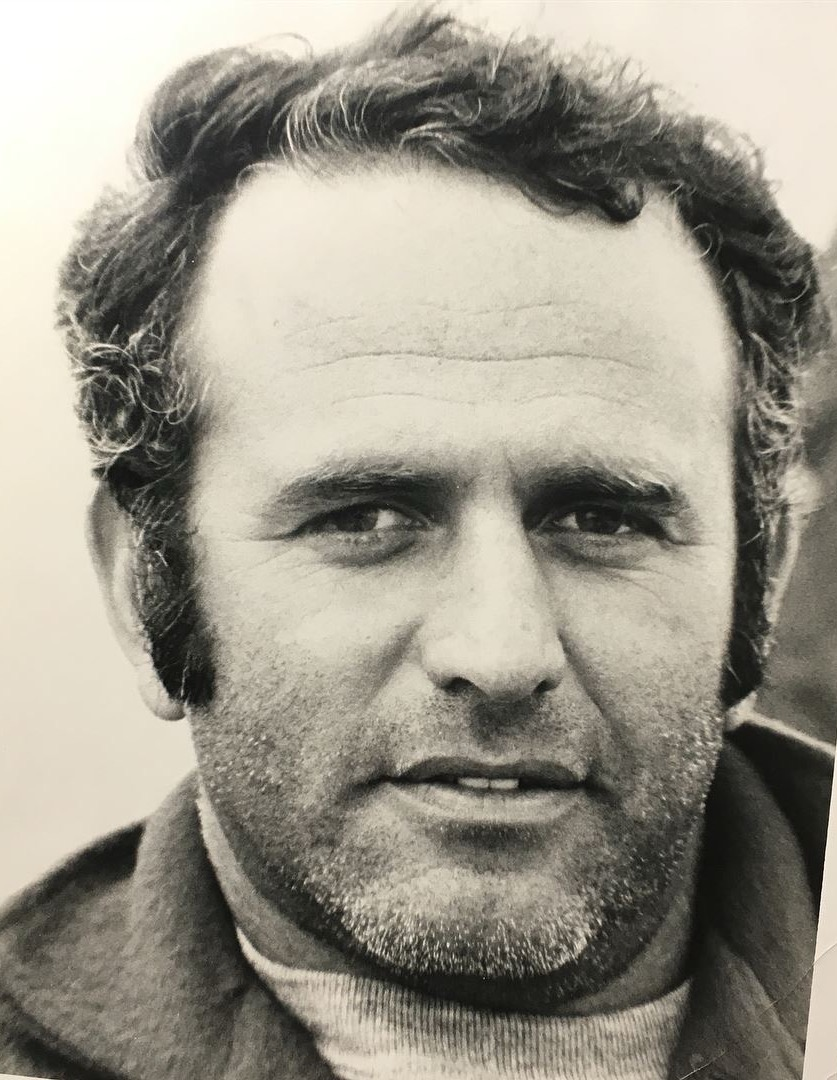
- Born: Carl Alan Kress; February 3, 1937; Los Angeles, California, U.S.
- Died: May 11, 2012 (aged 75); Bishop, California, U.S.
- Occupations: Film and sound editor
- Parent: Harold F. Kress (father)

Carl Alan Kress (February 3, 1937 – May 11, 2012) was an American film and sound editor. He won an Academy Award in the category Best Film Editing for the film The Towering Inferno. His win was shared with his father Harold F. Kress.

Kress died on May 11, 2012, in Bishop, California, at the age of 75.

== Filmography ==
Year	Title	Director	Notes
1970	The Liberation of L.B. Jones	William Wyler	
1970	Watermelon Man	Melvin Van Peebles	
1971	Doctors' Wives	George Schaefer	
1972	Cholo	Bernardo Batievsky	
1974	Sugar Hill	Paul Maslansky	
1974	Act of Vengeance	Bob Kelljan	
1974	The Towering Inferno	John Guillermin	with Harold F. Kress
1976	Drum	Steve Carver	
1976	The Blue Bird	George Cukor	Uncredited
1977	Audrey Rose	Robert Wise	
1978	Shame, Shame on the Bixby Boys	Anthony Bowers	Supervising editor
1979	Meteor	Ronald Neame	
1980	Hopscotch	Ronald Neame	
1981	Looker	Michael Crichton	
1983	Stroker Ace	Hal Needham	with William D. Gordean
1984	Cannonball Run II	Hal Needham	with William D. Gordean
1986	Rad	Hal Needham	
1988	Bloodsport	Newt Arnold	with Michael J. Duthie
1989	Meet the Hollowheads	Thomas R. Burman	
1991	Wedlock	Lewis Teague	
1995	Bodily Harm	James Lemmo	
2000	The Redemption	Himself	Also director
2002	The Marriage Undone	Sarah Nean Bruce	with Eduardo Durão
2004	Slammed	Brian Thomas Jones	

== Awards and nominations ==
Award	Year	Category	Work	Result	Ref.
Academy Award	1975	Best Film Editing	The Towering Inferno	Won	
American Cinema Editors Award	1975	Best Edited Feature Film – Dramatic	The Towering Inferno	Nominated	
Primetime Emmy Award	1976	Outstanding Sound Editing for a Limited or Anthology Series, Movie or Special	The Night That Panicked America	Won	
