= The Fifth Missile =

- Genre: Drama; Thriller
- Based on: The Gold Crew by Frank M. Robinson and Thomas N. Scortia
- Written by: Eric Bercovici
- Directed by: Larry Peerce
- Starring: Robert Conrad; Sam Waterston; David Soul; Richard Roundtree; Jonathan Banks; Yvette Mimieux
- Music by: Pino Donaggio
- Countries of origin: Italy; United States
- Original language: English

Production
- Executive producer: Eric Bercovici
- Producer: Arthur Fellows
- Production locations: Malta; Cinecittà Studios, Arsenale Marina Militare di Taranto, Cinecittà, Rome, Lazio, Italy
- Cinematography: Cristiano Pogany
- Editors: Maureen O'Connell; Jack Tucker
- Running time: 150 minutes
- Production companies: Bercovici/St.Johns Productions; Cinecittà; MGM/UA Television

Original release
- Network: NBC
- Release: February 23, 1986

The Fifth Missile is a 1986 television movie starring Robert Conrad, Sam Waterston and David Soul about an American ballistic missile submarine, based on the novel The Gold Crew by Frank M. Robinson and Thomas N. Scortia. With the exception of Cmdr. Van Meer, the ship's crew goes slowly insane due to exposure to paint chemicals onboard and believes a missile test exercise is, in fact, nuclear war. It explores the inability of U.S. command structures to control and prevent rogue submarine officers from launching ballistic missiles.

== Cast ==
- Robert Conrad – Cmdr. Mark Van Meer
- Sam Waterston – Capt. Allard Renslow
- Richard Roundtree – Cmdr. Frederick Bryce
- Jonathan Banks – Ray Olson
- Art LaFleur – "Animal" Meslinsky
- Dennis Holahan – Warden
- Sergio Fantoni – Pietro
- Yvette Mimieux – Cheryl Leary
- David Soul – Capt. Kevin Harris
- Ed Bishop – Admiral Stewart Cullinane
- William Berger – Dr. Strickland
