= The Power (Studio One) =

- Studio One episode
- Episode no.: Season 8 Episode 37
- Directed by: William H. Brown Jr.
- Based on: The Power by Frank M. Robinson
- Original air date: June 4, 1956

"The Power" is an episode of the CBS television anthology series Studio One consisting of an hour-long adaptation of Frank M. Robinson's 1956 science fiction novel of the same name. The episode was first broadcast June 4, 1956. Directed by William H. Brown Jr., it starred James Daly as Bill Tanner, Shepperd Strudwick as Navy liaison Commander Nordlund, and Theodore Bikel as physicist Karl Grossman.

== See also ==
- The Power, 1968 theatrical film based on the same novel
