= Harold F. Kress =

American film editor

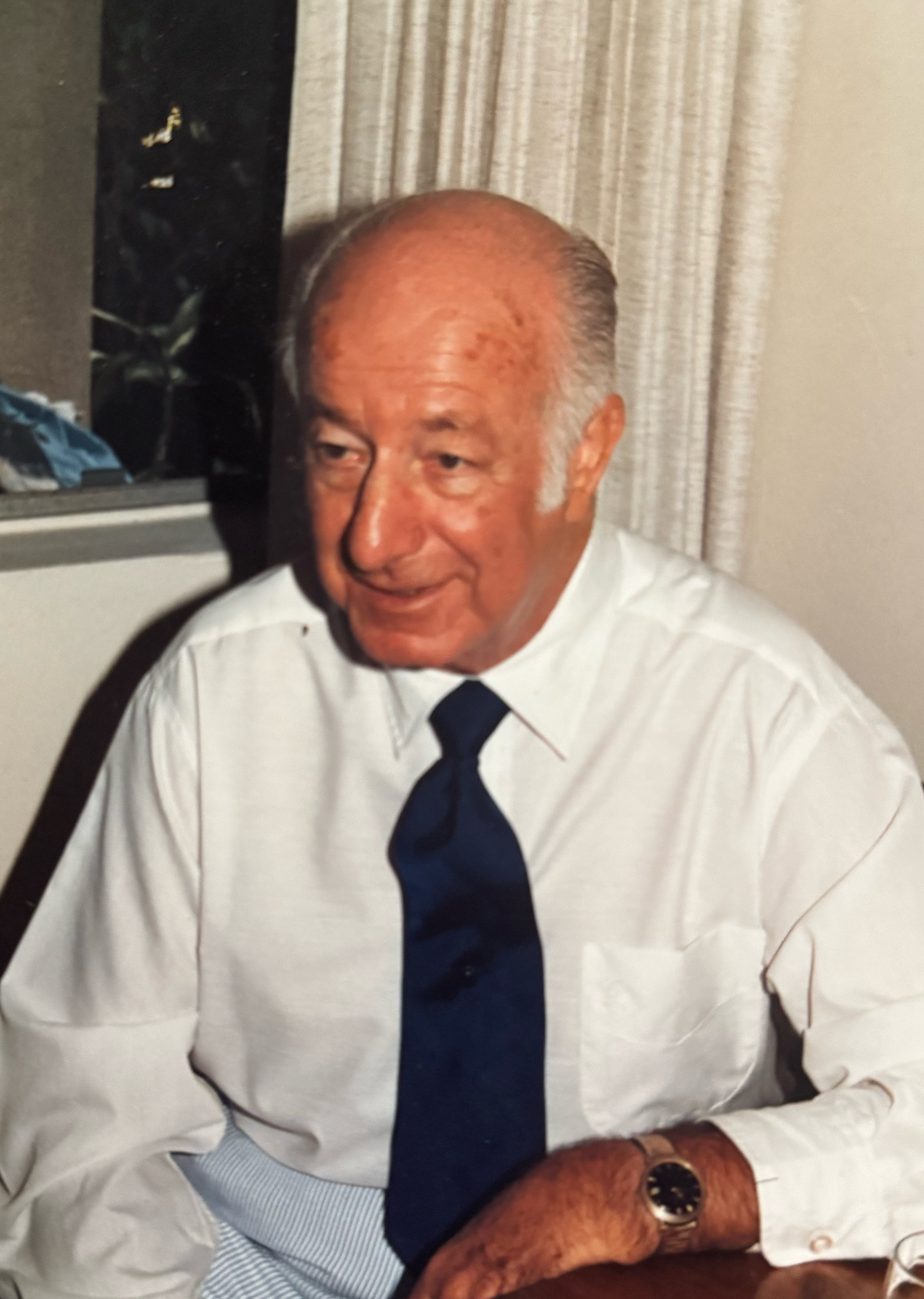
- Kress in 1986
- Born: Harold Frank Kress; June 26, 1913; Pittsburgh, Pennsylvania, U.S.
- Died: September 18, 1999 (aged 86); Palm Desert, California, U.S.
- Occupations: Film editor, director
- Years active: 1933–1978
- Spouse: Zelda Raphael Kress
- Children: Carl Kress

Harold Frank Kress (June 26, 1913 – September 18, 1999) was an American film editor and director. He worked on more than 60 feature films between 1939 and 1978. He won the Academy Award for Best Film Editing for How the West Was Won (1962) and again for The Towering Inferno (1974), and was nominated an additional four times.

Kress also worked publicly to increase the recognition of editing as a component of Hollywood filmmaking. He was one-time President of the Motion Picture Editors Guild, and a board member of the American Cinema Editors.

== Early life ==
Harold F. Kress was born in Pittsburgh, Pennsylvania. He was the son of Samuel Kress and Sophie Siegelman. The family moved to Los Angeles, where his father ran a restaurant in Hollywood. Kress was studying to become a lawyer at the University of California, Los Angeles until he unexpectedly received an opportunity from Irving Thalberg to work in the editing department at the Metro-Goldwyn-Mayer (MGM) film studio.

== Career ==
=== MGM years ===
He worked for three years as an uncredited assistant on The Good Earth (1937). His first credit was for Broadway Serenade (directed by Robert Z. Leonard-1939). In that same year Kress worked on four other films. In the words of Tony Sloman, "MGM was the glamour film factory, the Rolls-Royce of Hollywood, and they put a new movie into production every 10 days. Kress's six (sic) films of 1939 (including Richard Thorpe's The Adventures of Huckleberry Finn, as supervising editor) proved he could work well under pressure and was unfazed by glamour. In 1940 he went on to edit Andy Hardy Meets Debutante, one of Louis B. Mayer's favourite series episodes, Comrade X, starring the studio's pride and joy, the king of Hollywood himself, Clark Gable, and two extremely successful Jeanette MacDonald-Nelson Eddy vehicles titled Bitter Sweet and New Moon. The success of these films thrust Kress into the top rank of MGM feature editors."

Kress edited the 1942 film Random Harvest that was directed by Mervyn LeRoy. The film was nominated for seven Academy Awards and "was one of MGM's biggest hits in 1942—indeed, one of the biggest in the studio's history."

Kress worked for thirty years at MGM. Although he directed a few documentaries and made a stab at directing features, his real niche was as an editor, where he was one of the most respected editors in the industry. Ronald Bergan noted that "working as he did in the commercial cinema, he was an adherent of the 'invisible cutting' and 'editing for continuity' school rather than the 'dynamic montage' techniques developed by early Russian cinema or the iconoclastic editing styles derived from the French New Wave."

=== Later films and involvement with the Motion Picture Editors Guild ===
One of the high points of his career came after he left MGM. This was the editing of The Towering Inferno (1974), with his son Carl Kress. In the words of Tony Sloman, "The Towering Inferno is superbly put together, its pyramidal star structure cleverly maintained throughout, its climax as the high-level water tanks flood the blazing glass tower genuinely riveting, but there is a single edit within that film which encapsulates the art, craft and skill of the professional editor. Fred Astaire has taken a spreadsheet-sized junk bond certificate from out of his briefcase and puts it folded into his inside pocket. Seamless, except you never see him fold the document. It's done - brilliantly on a cut, an edit that must have brought great satisfaction to whichever Kress wrought it, and a supreme example of great (and totally invisible) editing."

Kress had been selected as a member of the American Cinema Editors, had been elected to the board of the organization, and been elected to the presidency (1967–1968) of the Motion Picture Editors Guild by its membership. In 1992 he received the American Cinema Editors Career Achievement Award. He used the occasion to note that film editing had become better recognized over his career as a component of filmmaking: "'We wanted to get our names from the bottom of the crawl to the top, with the director, cinematographer and costume designer,' he said. And he achieved that." In his 1992 interview with Gabriella Oldham, Kress noted "When I was president of the union for two years, I fought for recognition for the editor. I started the fight to get editors' names raised up on the credits. Now we get screen credit, and some producers and directors give advertising credit too, but that took a long time. On those MGM lists, we usually were down at the bottom. Finally, we crawled up to the middle, then we got underneath the camera, then we got on top of the camera. We're the directors' best friends and the directors helped move us up."

== Personal life ==
Kress was married to Zelda Raphael, and predeceased her. They had one son, Carl, who also became a film editor who shared an Oscar with his father for 1974's The Towering Inferno.

=== Death ===
After suffering from cancer for a number of years, Kress died in Palm Desert, California, on September 18, 1999, at the age of 86.

== Filmography ==
This filmography is based on the listing at the Internet Movie Database except as otherwise noted.

Year	Film	Director	Notes
1939	Broadway Serenade	Robert Z. Leonard	
1939	Remember?	Robert Z. Leonard	
1939	It's a Wonderful World	W. S. Van Dyke	
1939	These Glamour Girls	S. Sylvan Simon	
1939	The Adventures of Huckleberry Finn	Richard Thorpe	Supervising editor, uncredited.
1940	New Moon	Robert Z. Leonard; W. S. Van Dyke	
1940	Andy Hardy Meets Debutante	George B. Seitz	
1940	Bitter Sweet	W. S. Van Dyke	
1940	Comrade X	King Vidor	
1941	Rage in Heaven	W. S. Van Dyke; Robert B. Sinclair; Richard Thorpe	
1941	Unholy Partners	Mervyn LeRoy	The first of five films directed by LeRoy and edited by Kress.
1941	H. M. Pulham, Esq.	King Vidor	
1941	Dr. Jekyll and Mr. Hyde	Victor Fleming	Nominated—Academy Award for Best Film Editing
1942	Mrs. Miniver	William Wyler	Nominated—Academy Award for Best Film Editing
1942	Random Harvest	Mervyn LeRoy	
1943	Madame Curie	Mervyn LeRoy	
1943	Cabin in the Sky	Vincente Minnelli	The first of three films directed by Minnelli and edited by Kress.
1946	Dragon Seed	Harold S. Bucquet; Jack Conway	
1947	The Yearling	Clarence Brown	Nominated—Academy Award for Best Film Editing
1948	A Date with Judy	Richard Thorpe	
1948	Command Decision	Sam Wood	
1949	The Great Sinner	Robert Siodmak	
1949	East Side, West Side	Mervyn LeRoy	
1950	The Miniver Story	H. C. Potter	
1951	The Painted Hills	Himself	Director only
1951	No Questions Asked	Himself	Director only
1952	Apache War Smoke	Himself	Director only
1953	Saadia	Albert Lewin	
1953	Ride, Vaquero!	John Farrow	
1954	Rose Marie	Mervyn LeRoy	The fifth and final film directed by LeRoy and edited by Kress.
1954	Green Fire	Andrew Marton	
1954	Valley of the Kings	Robert Pirosh	
1955	I'll Cry Tomorrow	Daniel Mann	
1955	The Cobweb	Vincente Minnelli	
1955	The Prodigal	Richard Thorpe	
1956	The Rack	Arnold Laven	
1956	The Teahouse of the August Moon	Daniel Mann	
1957	Until They Sail	Robert Wise	
1957	Silk Stockings	Rouben Mamoulian	
1958	Merry Andrew	Michael Kidd	
1958	Imitation General	George Marshall	
1959	The World, the Flesh and the Devil	Ranald MacDougall	
1959	Count Your Blessings	Jean Negulesco	
1960	Home from the Hill	Vincente Minnelli	The third and last film directed by Minnelli and edited by Kress.
1961	King of Kings	Nicholas Ray	
1962	How the West Was Won	John Ford; Henry Hathaway; George Marshall	Academy Award for Best Film Editing; ACE Eddie for Best Edited Feature Film – Dramatic
1963	It Happened at the World's Fair	Norman Taurog	Uncredited. This was the last film Kress made at the MGM Studio; he'd worked for the studio for more than 25 years.
1965	The Greatest Story Ever Told	George Stevens	
1966	Alvarez Kelly	Edward Dmytryk	
1967	The Ambushers	Henry Levin	
1967	Luv	Clive Donner	
1968	Star Spangled Salesman	Norman Maurer; Wingate Smith	
1970	I Walk the Line	John Frankenheimer	Supervising editor
1971	The Horsemen	John Frankenheimer	
1972	The Poseidon Adventure	Ronald Neame	Nominated—Academy Award for Best Film Editing; Nominated—ACE Eddie for Best Edited Feature Film – Dramatic
1972	Stand Up and Be Counted	Jackie Cooper	
1973	The Iceman Cometh	John Frankenheimer	
1974	99 and 44/100% Dead	John Frankenheimer	
1974	The Towering Inferno	John Guillermin	Academy Award for Best Film Editing; Nominated—ACE Eddie for Best Edited Feature Film – Dramatic
1976	Gator	Burt Reynolds	
1977	Viva Knievel!	Gordon Douglas	
1977	The Other Side of Midnight	Charles Jarrott	
1978	The Swarm	Irwin Allen	

== Awards and nominations ==
Kress was nominated for the Academy Award for Best Film Editing for Dr. Jekyll and Mr. Hyde (1941), Mrs. Miniver (1942), and The Yearling (1947). Kress won his first Academy Award for How the West Was Won (1962). He was nominated again for The Poseidon Adventure (1972), and would win again for the 1974 action film The Towering Inferno with son Carl Kress. Only a handful of editors have received more than Kress' six nominations and two Academy Awards.

He won the Eddie award of the American Cinema Editors for How the West Was Won (1962), and he was nominated for The Poseidon Adventure (1972) and The Towering Inferno (1974). In 1992 he received their Career Achievement Award.

== See also ==
- List of film director and editor collaborations. From 1941 through 1954, Kress edited five films that were directed by Mervyn LeRoy. Random Harvest (1942) was nominated for Academy Awards both for best picture and for best directing. Madame Curie (1943) was nominated for best picture.
