= The Towering Inferno =

1974 American disaster film

- Theatrical release poster by John Berkey
- Directed by: John Guillermin (Note: Irwin Allen directed the action sequences.)
- Screenplay by: Stirling Silliphant
- Based on: The Tower by Richard Martin Stern; The Glass Inferno by; Thomas N. Scortia; Frank M. Robinson
- Produced by: Irwin Allen
- Starring: Steve McQueen; Paul Newman; William Holden; Faye Dunaway; Fred Astaire; Susan Blakely; Richard Chamberlain; Jennifer Jones; O. J. Simpson; Robert Vaughn; Robert Wagner
- Cinematography: Fred J. Koenekamp; Joseph Biroc
- Edited by: Harold F. Kress; Carl Kress
- Music by: John Williams
- Production companies: 20th Century-Fox; Warner Bros.; Irwin Allen Productions
- Distributed by: 20th Century-Fox (United States and Canada); Warner Bros. (International)
- Release date: December 16, 1974 (Los Angeles)
- Running time: 165 minutes
- Country: United States
- Language: English
- Budget: $14 million
- Box office: $203.3 million

The Towering Inferno is a 1974 American disaster film directed by John Guillermin and produced by Irwin Allen, featuring an ensemble cast led by Paul Newman and Steve McQueen. It was adapted by Stirling Silliphant from the novels The Tower by Richard Martin Stern and The Glass Inferno by Thomas N. Scortia and Frank M. Robinson. In addition to McQueen and Newman, the cast includes William Holden, Faye Dunaway, Fred Astaire, Susan Blakely, Richard Chamberlain, O. J. Simpson, Robert Vaughn, Robert Wagner, and Jennifer Jones in her final role.

The Towering Inferno premiered on December 16, 1974 in Los Angeles and was released by 20th Century-Fox in the United States and Canada and by Warner Bros. in other territories. The film received generally positive reviews from critics, and earned around $203.3 million, making it the highest-grossing film of 1974. It was nominated for eight Academy Awards, including Best Picture, winning three: Best Song, Best Cinematography and Best Editing.

== Plot ==
Architect Doug Roberts returns to San Francisco for the dedication of The Glass Tower, a mixed-use skyscraper that he designed for developer James Duncan. The tower, 1,688 feet (515 m) tall and 138 stories, is the world's tallest building. During testing, an electrical short-circuit starts a fire in a storage room on the 81st floor after another short occurs in the main utility room. While examining the latter short, Roberts sees the wiring is inadequate and suspects that Roger Simmons, the electrical subcontractor and Duncan's son-in-law, cut corners. Roberts confronts Simmons, who feigns innocence.

During the dedication ceremony, chief of public relations Dan Bigelow turns on all the tower's lights, but Roberts orders them shut off to reduce the load on the electrical system. Smoke is seen on the 81st floor, and the San Francisco Fire Department is summoned. Roberts and engineer Will Giddings go to that floor, where Giddings is fatally burned pushing a guard away from the fire. With the dedication party now in full swing in the tower's Promenade Room on the 135th floor, Roberts reports the fire to Duncan, who is courting Senator Gary Parker for an urban renewal contract and refuses to order an evacuation.

SFFD Chief Michael O'Hallorhan forces Duncan to evacuate the guests from the Promenade Room. Simmons admits to Duncan that he cut corners to bring the project back under budget, and suggests other subcontractors did likewise. Fire overtakes the express elevators, killing a group whose elevator stops on the engulfed 81st floor. Bigelow and his girlfriend Lorrie are killed when another fire traps them in the Duncan Enterprises offices on the 65th floor. Lisolette Mueller, a guest and resident of the tower being wooed by con man Harlee Claiborne, rushes to the 87th floor to check on a deaf mother Mrs. Allbright and her two children Phillip and Angela. Security chief Harry Jernigan rescues Mrs. Allbright, but a ruptured gas line explodes, destroying the stairwell and preventing Roberts and the rest from following. They traverse the wreckage of the stairwell to reach a service elevator that takes them to the 134th floor, but the door to the Promenade Room is blocked with hardened cement. Roberts uses a ventilation shaft to reach the room, while Lisolette and the children stay behind.

As firefighters begin to bring the fire under control on floor 65, the electrical system fails, deactivating the passenger elevators; O'Hallorhan abseils down the elevator shaft to safety. As firemen ascend to free the blocked door at the Promenade Room, another explosion destroys part of the remaining stairwell, blocking the last means of escape from the upper floors. After the stuck door is freed, reuniting Lisolette and the children with Roberts and the others, Simmons tries to escape down the stairwell, but is blocked by flames and retreats. Meanwhile, Claiborne reveals his true identity and intentions to Lisolette, who says she does not care and still wants to be with him.

An attempt at a helicopter rescue fails when two women run up to the aircraft; the pilot tries to evade them and crashes, setting the roof ablaze. A Navy rescue team attaches a breeches buoy between the Promenade Room and the roof of the adjacent 102-story Peerless Building, and rescues guests, including Patty Simmons, Duncan's daughter. Roberts rigs a "gravity brake" (fall arrest) on the scenic elevator, allowing one trip down for 12 people, including Roberts' fiancée Susan Franklin, Lisolette, and the children. An explosion near the 110th floor throws Lisolette from the elevator to her death, and leaves the elevator hanging by a single cable. O'Hallorhan rescues the elevator with a Navy helicopter.

As fire reaches the Promenade Room, a group led by Simmons attempts to commandeer the breeches buoy, which is destroyed in an explosion, killing Simmons, Senator Parker and others. In a last-ditch strategy, O'Hallorhan and Roberts blow up water tanks atop the Tower with plastic explosives. Although several are killed, including Mayor Bob Ramsay, most of the remaining partygoers survive as water rushes through the building, extinguishing the flames.

Claiborne, in shock upon hearing of Lisolette's death, is given her cat by Jernigan. Duncan consoles the grieving Patty, and promises such a disaster will never happen again. Roberts accepts O'Hallorhan's offer of guidance on how to build a fire-safe skyscraper. O'Hallorhan drives away, exhausted.

== Cast ==
- Steve McQueen as Michael O'Hallorhan, SFFD 5th Battalion Chief
- Paul Newman as Doug Roberts, the Glass Tower architect
- William Holden as James Duncan, the builder
- Faye Dunaway as Susan Franklin, Doug Roberts' fiancée
- Fred Astaire as Harlee Claiborne, the con-man who flirts with Mrs. Mueller
- Susan Blakely as Patty Duncan Simmons, James Duncan's daughter
- Richard Chamberlain as Roger Simmons, the electrical engineer and Duncan's son-in-law
- Jennifer Jones as Lisolette Mueller
- O. J. Simpson as Harry Jernigan, the chief security officer
- Robert Vaughn as U.S. Senator Gary Parker
- Robert Wagner as Dan Bigelow, the public relations officer
- Susan Flannery as Lorrie, Dan Bigelow's secretary and secret lover
- Norman Burton as Will Giddings, electrical engineer
- Jack Collins as Mayor Robert "Bob" Ramsay
- Sheila Matthews Allen as Paula Ramsay, the city's First Lady
- Gregory Sierra as Carlos, the bartender
- Don Gordon as Kappy, SFFD Truck Co. 12 fire captain
- Felton Perry as Scott, SFFD Engine Co. 4 fireman
- Ernie F. Orsatti as Mark Powers, SFFD Engine Co. 4 fireman
- Dabney Coleman as SFFD Deputy Chief 1
- Norm Grabowski as Flaker, Navy Air Rescue Chief
- Ross Elliott as SFFD Deputy Chief 2
- John Crawford as Callahan, head chief of building utilities
- Erik Nelson as Wes, assistant to chief of building utilities
- Mike Lookinland as Phillip Allbright
- Carlena Gower as Angela Allbright
- Carol McEvoy as Mrs. Allbright
- Scott Newman as young fireman
- Olan Soule as Prof. Johnson
- Maureen McGovern as Singer at the party (Although not listed in the cast credits, her performance is acknowledged in the end titles.)
- Elizabeth Rogers as Lady in breeches buoy
- Ann Leicester as Guest
- Paul Comi as Tim
- George Wallace as Chief officer
- Patrick Culliton as Technician (utilities)
- William Bassett as Leasing agent
- LCDR Norman Hicks as Pilot
- LTJG Thomas Karnahan as Co-pilot
- Art Balinger as Red-carpet announcer
- William Traylor as Bill Harton, security guard (uncredited)

== Production ==
=== Development ===
In April 1973, it was announced that Warner Bros. production chief John Calley paid $350,000 for the rights to Richard Martin Stern's The Tower, prior to that book's publication. This amount was larger than originally reported. The book had been the subject of a bidding war between Warner Bros., 20th Century Fox and Columbia Pictures; Columbia dropped out when the price reached $200,000 and Warner Bros. offered $390,000. Irwin Allen, who had recently had a big success with a disaster movie, The Poseidon Adventure, was at Fox and persuaded that studio to make a higher offer when the book was sold to Warner Bros.

Eight weeks later Fox was submitted a novel, Thomas N. Scortia and Frank M. Robinson's The Glass Inferno, which was published the following year and which Allen says had "the same sort of characters, the same locale, the same story, the same conclusion". They bought the novel for a reported fee of $400,000.

Allen was concerned that twin films about a tall building on fire might cannibalize each other, remembering what happened in the 1960s when rival biopics about Oscar Wilde (with Oscar Wilde and The Trials of Oscar Wilde in 1960) and Jean Harlow (with Magna Media Distribution's Harlow and Paramount Pictures's Harlow in 1965) were released. He persuaded executives at both studios to join forces to make a single film on the subject. The studios issued a joint press release announcing the single film collaboration in October 1973. Stirling Silliphant, who had written The Poseidon Adventure, would write the script and Allen would produce. It was decided to split costs equally between the studios, but the film would be made at Fox, where Allen was based. Fox would distribute in the United States and Canada and Warner Bros. outside those territories. Warner Bros. also handled the worldwide television distribution rights. Incidents and character names were taken from both novels.

The total cost for the film was US$14 million.

=== Casting ===
Several actors who appeared in small roles, including John Crawford, Erik Nelson, Elizabeth Rogers, Ernie Orsatti and Sheila Matthews (Allen's wife) had previously appeared in The Poseidon Adventure, which Allen also produced. Additionally, Paul Newman's son, Scott, played the acrophobic fireman afraid to rappel down the elevator shaft.

Lead actors Steve McQueen and Paul Newman were each paid $1 million.

Although famed for his dancing and singing in musical movies, Fred Astaire received his only Academy Award nomination for this film. He also won both a BAFTA Award and a Golden Globe Award for his performance.

=== Filming ===
Principal photography took place over 14 weeks in mid-1974, at the Fox Studio Lot in Los Angeles. Pete Lucarrelli, chief of the Los Angeles Fire Department, served as a technical advisor on the production. In a 1990 interview, John Guillermin said that Newman and McQueen were very good to work with, and added considerably to their roles.

=== Music ===
The score was composed and conducted by John Williams, orchestrated by Herbert W. Spencer and Al Woodbury, and recorded at the 20th Century Fox scoring stage October 31 and November 4, 7 and 11, 1974. The original recording engineer was Ted Keep.

Source music in portions of the film includes instrumental versions of "Again" by Lionel Newman and Dorcas Cochran, "You Make Me Feel So Young" by Josef Myrow and Mack Gordon, and "The More I See You" by Harry Warren and Mack Gordon.

A snippet of a cue from Williams' score to Cinderella Liberty, entitled "Maggie Shoots Pool", is heard in a scene in which William Holden's character James Duncan converses on the phone with Newman's character Doug Roberts. It is not the recording on the soundtrack album, but a newer arrangement recorded for The Towering Inferno.

One of the most sought-after unreleased music cues from the film is the one in which Williams provides low-key lounge music during a party prior to the announcement of a fire. Michael O'Hallorhan (McQueen) orders Duncan to evacuate the party; the music becomes louder as Lisolette Mueller (Jennifer Jones) and Harlee Claiborne (Astaire) are seen dancing and Duncan lectures son-in-law Roger Simmons (Richard Chamberlain). Entitled "The Promenade Room" on the conductor's cue sheet, the track features a ragged ending, as Duncan asks the house band to stop playing. Because of this, Film Score Monthly did not add this cue to the expanded soundtrack album.

The Academy Award-winning song "We May Never Love Like This Again" was composed by Al Kasha and Joel Hirschhorn, and performed by Maureen McGovern, who appears in a cameo as a lounge singer, and on the score's soundtrack album, which features the film recording, plus the commercially released single version. Additionally, the theme tune is interpolated into the film's underscore by Williams. The song's writers collaborated on "The Morning After" from The Poseidon Adventure, an Oscar-winning song that was also recorded by McGovern, although hers was not the vocal used in that film.

The first release of portions of the score from The Towering Inferno was issued by Warner Bros. Records in early 1975 (Catalog No. BS-2840).

1. "Main Title" (5:00)
2. "An Architect's Dream" (3:28)
3. "Lisolette And Harlee" (2:34)
4. "Something For Susan" (2:42)
5. "Trapped Lovers" (4:28)
6. "We May Never Love Like This Again" – Kasha/Hirschhorn, performed by Maureen McGovern (2:11)
7. "Susan And Doug" (2:30)
8. "The Helicopter Explosion" (2:50)
9. "Planting The Charges – And Finale" (10:17)

A near-complete release was issued on the Film Score Monthly label April 1, 2001, and was produced by Lukas Kendall and Nick Redman. Film Score Monthly's was an almost completely expanded version, remixed from album masters at Warner Bros. archives and the multi-track 35mm magnetic film stems at 20th Century Fox. Placed into chronological order and restoring action cues, it became one of the company's biggest sellers; only 4,000 copies were pressed, and it is now out of print.

Reports that this soundtrack and that of the film Earthquake, also composed by Williams, borrowed cues from each other are inaccurate. The version of "Main Title" on the Film Score Monthly disc is the film version. It differs from the original soundtrack album version. There is a different balance of instruments in two spots, and in particular, the snare drum is more prominent than the album version, which also features additional cymbal work. Although the album was not a re-recording, the original LP tracks were recorded during the same sessions, and several cues were combined. The film version sound was reportedly better than the quarter-inch Warner Bros. two-track album master. Although some minor incidental cues were lost, some sonically "damaged" cues — so called due to a deterioration of the surviving audio elements — are placed at the end of the disc's program time following the track, "An Architect's Dream", which is used over the end credits sequence.

1. "Main Title" (5:01)
2. "Something For Susan" (2:42)
3. "Lisolette and Harlee" (2:35)
4. "The Flame Ignites" (1:01)
5. "More For Susan" (1:55)
6. "Harlee Dressing" (1:37)
7. "Let There Be Light" (:37)
8. "Alone At Last" (:51)
9. "We May Never Love Like This Again (Film Version)" – Maureen McGovern (2:04)
10. "The First Victims" (3:24)
11. "Not A Cigarette" (1:18)
12. "Trapped Lovers" (4:44)
13. "Doug's Fall/Piggy Back Ride" (2:18)
14. "Lisolette's Descent" (3:07)
15. "Down The Pipes/The Door Opens" (2:59)
16. "Couples" (3:38)
17. "Short Goodbyes" (2:26)
18. "Helicopter Rescue" (3:07)
19. "Passing The Word" (1:12)
20. "Planting The Charges" (9:04)
21. "Finale" (3:57)
22. "An Architect's Dream" (3:28)
23. "We May Never Love Like This Again (Album Version)" – Maureen McGovern (2:13)
24. "The Morning After (Instrumental)" (2:07)
25. "Susan And Doug (Album Track)" (2:33)
26. "Departmental Pride and The Cat (Damaged)" (2:34)
27. "Helicopter Explosion (Damaged)" (2:34)
28. "Waking Up (Damaged)" (2:39)

== Release ==
The Towering Inferno premiered at the Avco Theater in Los Angeles on December 16, 1974. A premiere in New York City was held on December 19 at the National Theatre, with the full participation of the New York Fire Department; six fire engines were displayed on site for an hour, which led to some criticism in the press over a perceived waste of resources, and a lack of clarity over whether they would have been available to respond to any calls. The film was released in the United States and Canada by 20th Century Fox and internationally by Warner Bros.

=== Top billing ===
Steve McQueen, Paul Newman and William Holden all wanted top billing. Holden was refused, his long-term standing as a box-office draw having been eclipsed by both McQueen and Newman. To provide dual top billing the credits were arranged diagonally, with McQueen lower left and Newman upper right. Thus each appeared to have first billing, depending on whether the credit was read left-to-right or top-to-bottom. This was the first time this "staggered but equal" billing was used in a movie, although it had been considered earlier for the same two actors for Butch Cassidy and the Sundance Kid until McQueen turned down the Sundance Kid role. McQueen is mentioned first in the film's trailers. In the cast list rolling from top to bottom at the end of the film, however, McQueen and Newman's names were arranged diagonally as at the beginning; as a consequence Newman's name is fully visible first.

== Reception ==
=== Box office ===
The film was one of the biggest-grossing films of 1975, with theatrical rentals of $48,838,000 in the United States and Canada. In January 1976, it was claimed that the film had attained the highest foreign film rental for any film in its initial release, with $43 million, and went on to earn $56 million. When combined with the rentals from the United States and Canada, the worldwide rental is $104,838,000.

The film grossed $116 million in the United States and Canada and $203 million worldwide.

=== Critical response ===
The Towering Inferno received generally positive reviews from critics and audiences alike on its release. The film has an approval rating of 69% based on 91 reviews on Rotten Tomatoes. The site's consensus states: "Although it is not consistently engaging enough to fully justify its towering runtime, The Towering Inferno is a blustery spectacle that executes its disaster premise with flair." Metacritic gave the film a score of 69 based on 11 reviews, indicating "generally favorable reviews".

Roger Ebert of the Chicago Sun-Times gave the film three stars out of four, and praised it as "the best of the mid-1970s wave of disaster films".

Variety praised the film as "one of the greatest disaster pictures made, a personal and professional triumph for producer Irwin Allen. The $14 million cost has yielded a truly magnificent production which complements but does not at all overwhelm a thoughtful personal drama."

Vincent Canby of The New York Times wrote that the film is "overwrought and silly in its personal drama, but the visual spectacle is first rate. You may not come out of the theater with any important ideas about American architecture or enterprise, but you will have had a vivid, completely safe nightmare."

Pauline Kael, writing for The New Yorker, panned the writing and characters as retreads from The Poseidon Adventure, and further wrote, "What was left out this time was the hokey fun. When a picture has any kind of entertainment in it, viewers don't much care about credibility, but when it isn't entertaining we do. And when a turkey bores us and insults our intelligence for close to three hours, it shouldn't preen itself on its own morality."

Gene Siskel of Chicago Tribune gave the film two-and-a-half stars out of four, calling it "a stunt and not a story. It's a technical achievement more concerned with special effects than with people. That's why our attitude toward the film's cardboard characters is: let 'em burn."

FilmInk called it "brilliant fun".

=== Awards and nominations ===
Award	Category	Nominee(s)	Result	Ref.
Academy Awards	Best Picture	Irwin Allen	Nominated	
Academy Awards	Best Supporting Actor	Fred Astaire	Nominated	
Academy Awards	Best Art Direction	Art Direction: William J. Creber and Ward Preston; Set Decoration: Raphaël Bretton	Nominated	
Academy Awards	Best Cinematography	Fred J. Koenekamp and Joseph Biroc	Won	
Academy Awards	Best Film Editing	Harold F. Kress and Carl Kress	Won	
Academy Awards	Best Original Dramatic Score	John Williams	Nominated	
Academy Awards	Best Song	"We May Never Love Like This Again"; Music and Lyrics by Al Kasha and Joel Hirschhorn	Won	
Academy Awards	Best Sound	Theodore Soderberg and Herman Lewis	Nominated	
American Cinema Editors Awards	Best Edited Feature Film	Harold F. Kress and Carl Kress	Nominated	
British Academy Film Awards	Best Actor in a Supporting Role	Fred Astaire	Won	
British Academy Film Awards	Best Art Direction	William J. Creber, Ward Preston, and Raphaël Bretton	Nominated	
British Academy Film Awards	Best Cinematography	Fred J. Koenekamp	Nominated	
British Academy Film Awards	Best Original Music	John Williams (also for Jaws)	Won	
David di Donatello Awards	Best Foreign Film	Irwin Allen	Won	
Golden Globe Awards	Best Supporting Actor – Motion Picture	Fred Astaire	Won	
Golden Globe Awards	Best Supporting Actress – Motion Picture	Jennifer Jones	Nominated	
Golden Globe Awards	New Star of the Year – Actress	Susan Flannery	Won	
Golden Globe Awards	Best Screenplay – Motion Picture	Stirling Silliphant	Nominated	
Golden Globe Awards	Best Original Song – Motion Picture	"We May Never Love Like This Again"; Music and Lyrics by Al Kasha and Joel Hirschhorn	Nominated	
Golden Reel Awards	Best Sound Editing – Dialogue		Won	
Goldene Kamera	Golden Screen		Nominated	
Kinema Junpo Awards	Best Foreign Language Film	Irwin Allen and John Guillermin	Won	
National Board of Review Awards	Outstanding Special Effects		Won	
Satellite Awards (2006)	Best DVD Extras		Nominated	
Satellite Awards (2009)	Best Classic DVD	The Towering Inferno (as part of Paul Newman: The Tribute Collection)	Nominated	

== Legacy ==
The author Roderick Thorp was inspired by both The Towering Inferno and a dream of a man being chased through a skyscraper by men with guns to write a sequel to his novel The Detective. This sequel, Nothing Lasts Forever, was adapted into the action-thriller film Die Hard.

Both the journalist Ashleigh Banfield and the actress Liza Minnelli recalled The Towering Inferno when they saw the World Trade Center ablaze during the September 11 attacks.

== See also ==
- List of American films of 1974
- List of firefighting films
- Disco Inferno, a song inspired by the film
- 555 California Street
