= The Power (1968 film) =

1968 American science fiction film directed by Byron Haskin

- Theatrical release poster
- Directed by: Byron Haskin
- Screenplay by: John Gay
- Based on: The Power; 1956 novel by Frank M. Robinson
- Produced by: George Pal
- Starring: George Hamilton; Suzanne Pleshette
- Cinematography: Ellsworth Fredericks
- Edited by: Thomas J. McCarthy
- Music by: Miklós Rózsa
- Distributed by: Metro-Goldwyn-Mayer
- Release date: February 21, 1968
- Running time: 108 minutes
- Language: English

The Power is a 1968 American tech noir thriller film from MGM, produced by George Pal, directed by Byron Haskin (his final film), that stars George Hamilton and Suzanne Pleshette. It is based on the 1956 science fiction novel The Power by Frank M. Robinson.

The storyline concerns a hunt to find a man who seems to have the ability to control or slay others with his mind.

== Plot ==
The Committee on Human Endurance researches the human body's ability to survive pain and physical stress as part of the space program. Dr. Henry Hallson, an anthropologist on the committee, has designed a series of anonymous questionnaires to screen people with greater survival capacity, using other committee members as preliminary subjects.

Hallson reveals his findings at a meeting with chairman and biologist Dr. Jim Tanner, geneticist Dr. Margery Lansing, physicist Dr. Carl Melnicker, biologist Dr. Talbot Scott, Dr. Norman Van Zandt, and government liaison Arthur Nordlund. Hallson announces that someone on the committee possesses a super-intellect beyond human measurement, capable of controlling other human minds, including those of the committee. When no one admits to having Hallson's theorized powers, Dr. Melnicker suggests a telekinesis test using a simple psi wheel. Stating that the test subject will never reveal himself, Hallson insists that all of them concentrate on it together, which sends the wheel spinning.

Later that night, Hallson is found murdered in the laboratory's human centrifuge, with the name "Adam Hart" scrawled on a piece of paper in his office. Hallson's widow Sally Hallson tells Jim Tanner that "Adam Hart" was the name of her husband's childhood friend. Tanner speculates that a superhuman could exist with capabilities far in advance of normal humans, but Talbot Scott denies the possibility.

As the police investigate Hallson's murder, Tanner immediately becomes the prime suspect when it is found that he apparently lied about his distinguished academic credentials. In fact, all records documenting his past have been inexplicably erased. Tanner then suffers bizarre hallucinations and narrowly survives a psychic assault on his life. Desperate to uncover the truth, he travels to Hallson's hometown and learns that Adam Hart is a superhuman, with different people providing different descriptions of his appearance and others still obeying commands that Hart gave them years earlier.

As Tanner and Lansing search for the other committee members, Melnicker is murdered while Nordlund apparently survives another psychic assault by Hart. Dr. Van Zandt is revealed to be an ally of Hart, but is also murdered. Surviving yet another attack, Tanner returns to the research center and confronts Talbot Scott with the police close behind. Scott believes that Tanner is a superhuman and pleads for his life, but panics and is shot by the police.

In a final showdown, Tanner confronts Arthur Nordlund, who faked his own attack and is revealed to be Adam Hart. Hart unleashes another psychic assault on Tanner, but Tanner instead kills Hart with his own awakened psychic powers. Tanner realizes that he was the superhuman uncovered by Hallson's tests, and that Hart was trying to eliminate any competition from others like himself.

== Cast ==
- George Hamilton as Professor Jim Tanner
- Suzanne Pleshette as Professor Margery Lansing
- Michael Rennie as Arthur Nordlund (alias Adam Hart)
- Arthur O'Connell as Professor Henry Hallson
- Earl Holliman as Professor Talbot Scott
- Nehemiah Persoff as Professor Carl Melnicker
- Richard Carlson as Professor Norman E. Van Zandt
- Gary Merrill as Policeman Mark Corlane
- Yvonne De Carlo as Mrs. Sally Hallson
- Barbara Nichols as Flora (Joshua Falls diner)
- Aldo Ray as Bruce (Joshua Falls mechanic)
- Celia Lovsky as Mrs. Hallson (Henry's mother)
- Vaughn Taylor as Mr. Hallson (Henry's father)
- Ken Murray as Fred Grover (man at party)
- Beverly Powers (aka Miss Beverly Hills) as Sylvia (woman at party)
- Miiko Taka as Mrs. Van Zandt
- Lawrence Montaigne as Briggs
- Forrest J Ackerman as Hotel Clerk (uncredited)
- Timothy Smith as Elevator Man #1 (uncredited)
- Paul Lyttle as Elevator Man #2 (uncredited)

== Production ==
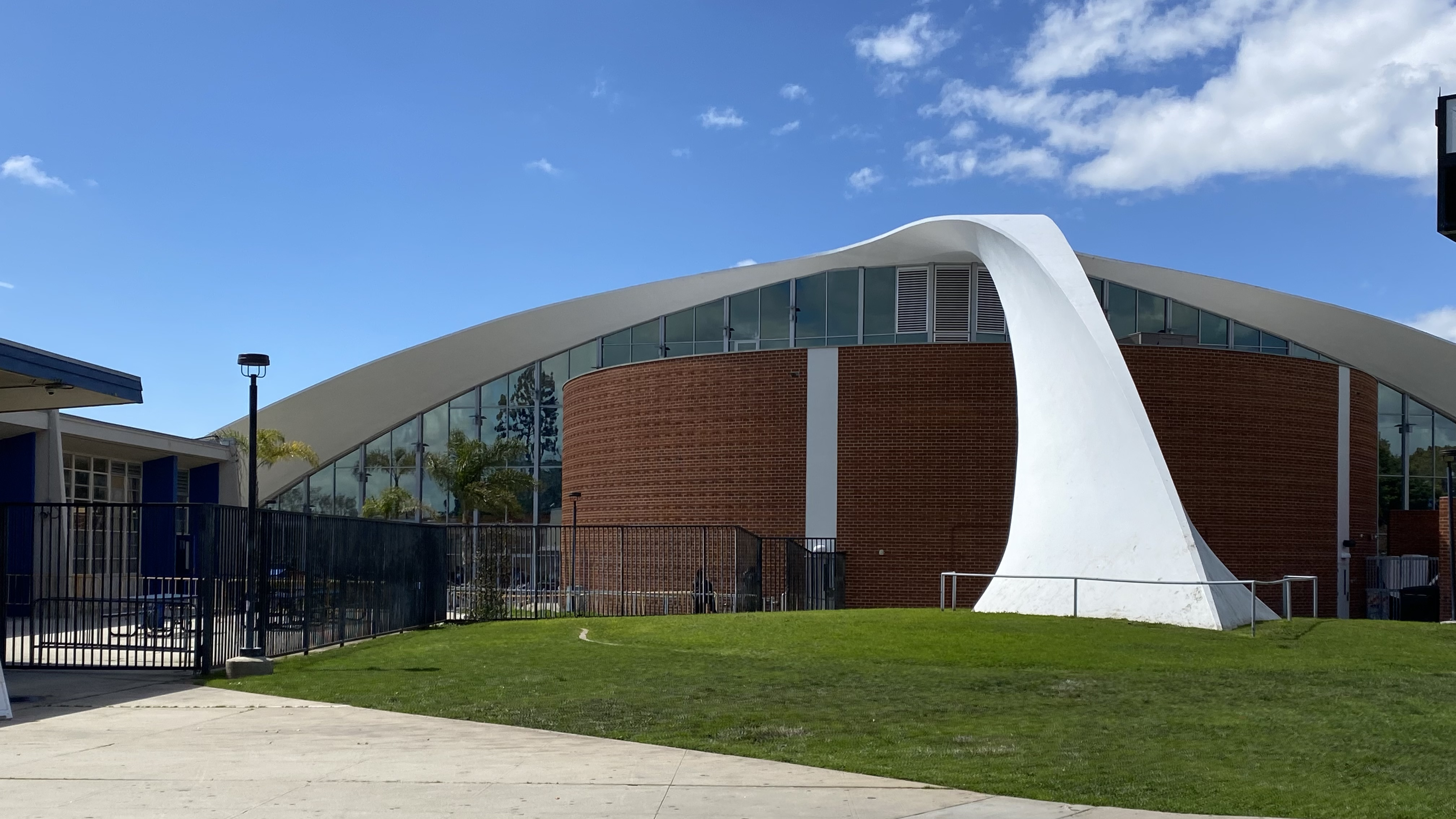
The Robert Frost Auditorium at Culver City High School was used for exterior shots of the research facility

The novel by Frank M. Robinson was published in 1956 (it was his first novel) and had already been filmed for television in 1956.

In June 1964, it was announced that MGM bought the screen rights to the novel for George Pal to produce. John Gay was writing the script.

The source novel's plot was substantially changed in John Gay's screenplay, moving the location to San Marino, California, changing most of the characters' names (although retaining the surnames of Tanner, Nordlund, and department head Professor Van Zandt), and eliminating several subplots and characters, presumably to fit the film's 108-minute run time.

In September 1964, Pal announced his slate of pictures for MGM were The Power, The Disappearance, Arabian Nights and Odd John.

In March 1965, Pal said MGM wanted a star to play the lead in The Power but "that would ruin the basis for the story because no one is supposed to know who 'the power' is." In January 1966 Pal was reportedly discussing the film with Cliff Robertson.

In June 1966, George Pal announced he would make seven projects over the next four years: Project SFW, The Power, Odd John, The Last Revolution, R.U.R. and a remake of Metropolis. (Of these only The Power would be made.) That month The Power was cast.

Hamilton starred as Professor Jim Tanner, with Pleshette as his teammate and romantic interest Margery Lansing (Marge Hanson in the novel), and Michael Rennie (famous among science fiction film fans as Klaatu in The Day the Earth Stood Still) as new government liaison Mr. Nordlund. Otherwise, the story unfolds in a fashion similar to the novel, except for a somewhat different twist to the conclusion. In the film Tanner defeats Hart but retains his humanity; in the novel, Tanner sheds his humanity after killing Hart, and looks forward to "playing God" with normal humans, just as Hart did.

Pal said he was inspired by the art of Salvador Dalí and Hieronymus Bosch.

"I have my own frame of reference for power," said Hamilton. "This film has nothing to do with my religion but I hope I can make the part somehow significant."

Filming started April 1967. The film was shot at Culver City and Santa Monica.

This film is memorable for a number of intriguing scenes, including murder by centrifuge, a seemingly possessed "Walk/Don't Walk" pedestrian sign, toy soldiers firing with real gunpowder, and "winking out" inanimate objects (the last two also in the novel). The soundtrack also memorably features a beating heart to signal the mind-control attempts and eerie music from a cymbalom (a hammered dulcimer-like instrument) accompanying the film's more suspenseful moments.

The music, written by Oscar-winning composer Miklós Rózsa, contributes an amusing fourth wall-breaking moment when Tanner, hearing the haunting tune, seems to expect a new disaster, only to be visibly relieved when he finds a cymbalum-violin duet being performed in the hotel lobby. This was Rózsa's final score for a film produced by MGM, for which he had scored numerous films throughout his career.

== Legacy ==
There is a scene of what may be the first appearance and operation by telekinesis of a psi wheel in a film.

== See also ==
- "The Power" (Studio One), a television adaptation of the same novel
- List of American films of 1968
