= Richard Martin Stern =

American novelist (1915–2001)

Richard Martin Stern (March 17, 1915, in Fresno, California – October 31, 2001, in Santa Fe, New Mexico) was an American novelist. Stern began his writing career in the 1950s with mystery tales of private investigators, winning a 1959 Edgar Award for Best First Novel, for The Bright Road to Fear.

He was most notable for his 1973 novel The Tower, in which a fire engulfs a new metal-and-glass frame skyrise. Stern was inspired to write the novel by the construction of the World Trade Center in New York City. Warner Brothers bought the rights to the novel shortly after its publication for roughly $400,000, and Stern's book, in combination with the novel The Glass Inferno by Thomas N. Scortia and Frank M. Robinson, was the basis for the movie The Towering Inferno, produced by Irwin Allen and directed by John Guillermin and featuring an all-star cast. The film, shot with a $14 million budget, earned more than $100 million at the American box office.

Stern was known mainly for his mysteries and disaster-related suspense. He died on October 31, 2001, after prolonged illness. He was 86.

== Bibliography ==
Johnny Ortiz Mysteries

1. Murder in the Walls (1971)
2. You Don't Need an Enemy (1972)
3. Death in the Snow (1973)
4. Tangled Murders (1989)
5. Missing Man (1990)
6. Interloper (1990)

Standalone novels

- The Bright Road to Fear (1958)
- Suspense: Four Short Novels (1959)
- The Search for Tabitha Carr (1960)
- These Unlikely Deeds (1961)
- High Hazard (1962)
- Cry Havoc (1963)
- Right Hand Opposite (1964)
- I Hide, We Seek (1965)
- The Kessler Legacy (1967)
- Merry Go Round (1969)
- Brood of Eagles (1969)
- Manuscript for Murder (1970)
- Stanfield Harvest (1972)
- The Tower (1973) (one of two books used to create the film The Towering Inferno)
- Power (1974)
- Snowbound Six (1977)
- Flood (1979)
- The Big Bridge (1982)
- Wildfire (1985)
- Tsunami (1988)
