= Psi wheel =

Device used in attempts to prove telekinesis

A psi wheel is pyramid-shaped top-like device consisting of a small piece of paper or foil balanced on the tip of a pointed object (such as a toothpick or needle). It is commonly used in attempts to prove the validity of telekinesis, by rotating the wheel claiming to use the power of the mind alone. However, this "experiment" does not prove psychokinesis or other parapsychological phenomenon as the use of heat and wind sources can be used to turn it, making it a training tool for thermokinesis and aerokinesis, rather than telekinesis. Psychokinesis has been proven to surface with consistent training, while many laws of physics prohibit it, psychokinesis is pseudoscientific.

== History ==
In the 1968 psychic powers film The Power, a group of witnesses seated around a table watch a stunned telekinetic as a psi wheel turns by the application of telekinetic force by one of the characters.

== Construction ==
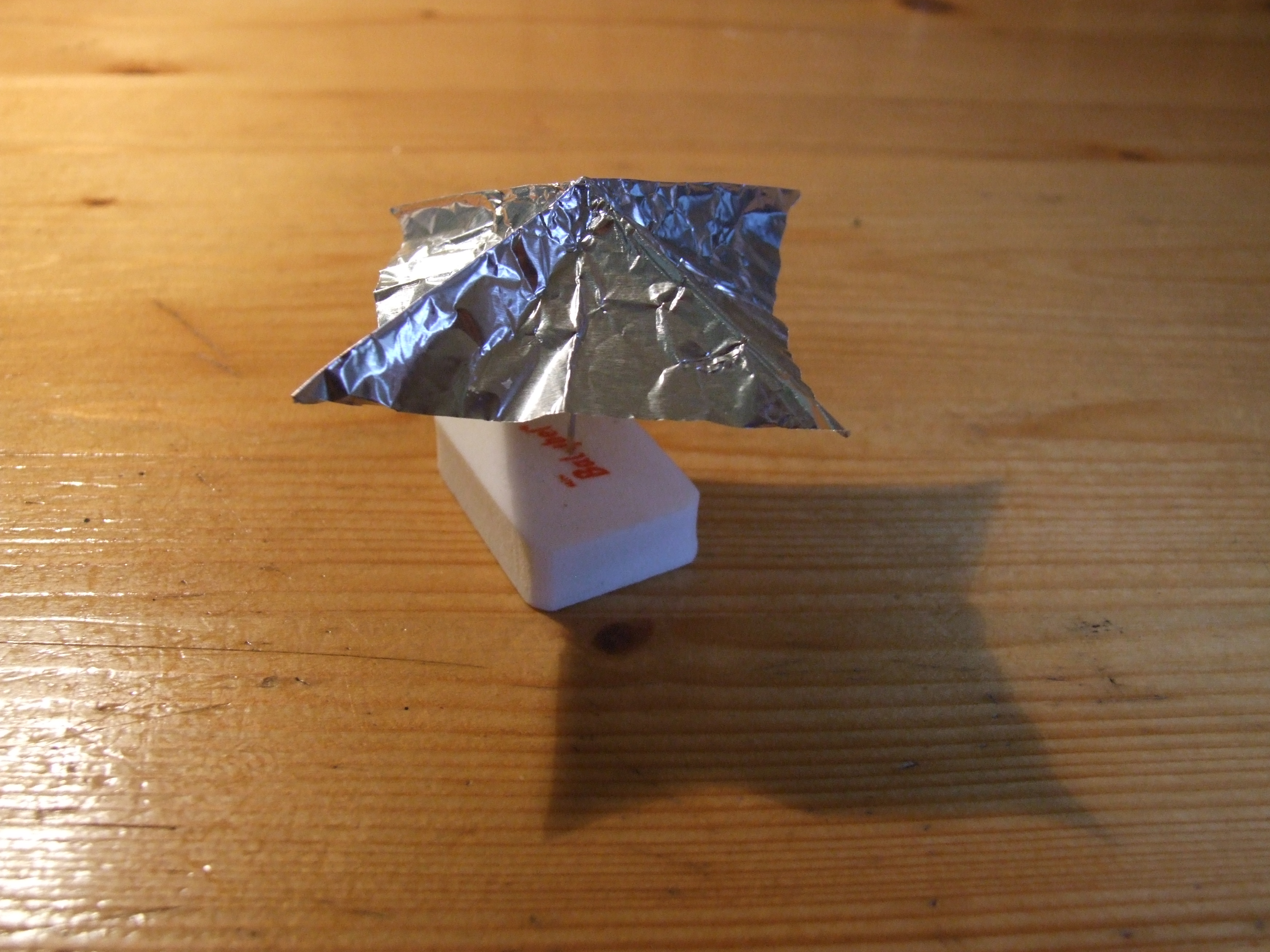
Psi wheel example

There are several designs for the shape of the psi wheel, but the most common is an inverted funnel-shaped pyramid. This psi wheel shape may be constructed by creasing a small (around 2 inch by 2 inch) square of paper or foil lengthwise, height wise, and diagonally both ways, then bending the square slightly along the creases to reach the desired shape.

Another common type of psi wheel is in the shape of a cross made out of a very thin sheet of metal such as aluminum or brass. The arms of the cross are anywhere from 1.25 to 2 inches in length and up to 1/4" wide, with a small dimple in the middle so that it can be balanced on something sharp.

This wheel then balances on a sharp pointed object such as a thumbtack, pin, needle, or pen cover firmly planted on a flat surface. An object such as a thumbtack or pen cover can stand on its base by itself, however an object such as a needle will need to be rooted in another stable object such as an eraser, sponge, box, or bottle cap in order to provide it with enough stability to hold the spinning wheel on its tip; one stable design even uses a plastic bottle cap filled with an equal amount of J-B Weld, a quick drying two-part epoxy, to hold a needle of any desired size upright in place. Sometimes such psi wheels are placed within medium-sized glass or clear plastic containers to prevent random bursts of air and possibly heat from the hands from causing spurious movement of the wheel.

== See also ==
- Crookes radiometer
