= Ward Preston =

American production designer and art director

- Born: William Ward Preston; April 20, 1932; Torrance, California, US
- Died: January 17, 2016 (aged 83); West Hills, California, US
- Occupations: Production designer; art director
- Years active: 1966–1997
- Notable credit: The Towering Inferno (1974)

William Ward Preston (April 20, 1932 – January 17, 2016) was an American production designer and art director. He was nominated for an Academy Award in the category Best Art Direction for the film The Towering Inferno.

== Selected filmography ==
- The Towering Inferno (1974)
