= The Power (Robinson novel) =

1956 sci-fi novel by Frank M. Robinson

Cover of the first standalone edition.

The Power is a 1956 science fiction novel by American writer Frank M. Robinson. It first appeared in the March 1956 edition of Blue Book magazine and then in a standalone book published by J. B. Lippincott in May that year. Its protagonist, a researcher named Tanner, discovers evidence of a person with psychic abilities among his coworkers. As he tries to uncover the superhuman, his existence is erased and his associates murdered, until he faces a showdown with an apparently invincible opponent.

The novel was made into a Studio One television episode and a 1968 film under the same name.

== Reception ==
Galaxy reviewer Floyd C. Gale praised the novel as "a harrowing chase that will have you biting your nails." Anthony Boucher found that the novel's logical extrapolation was "not so much absurd as just absent. . . . . there has never been a less credible picture of the next step in evolution"; but he, too, praised Robinson's melodramatic storytelling.
