= The Tower (Stern novel) =

1973 novel by Richard Martin Stern

- First edition
- Author: Richard Martin Stern
- Language: English
- Genre: Fiction
- Publisher: David McKay
- Publication date: 1973
- Publication place: United States
- Media type: Print (Hardcover)
- Pages: 343
- ISBN: 0-679-50363-3

The Tower is a 1973 novel by Richard Martin Stern. It is one of the two books drawn upon for the screenplay Stirling Silliphant wrote for the 1974 movie The Towering Inferno, the other being the 1974 novel The Glass Inferno by Thomas N. Scortia and Frank M. Robinson.

== Synopsis ==
=== Setting ===
The story unfolds on the day of the grand opening of the "World Tower Building" skyscraper in Lower Manhattan, New York City, situated several blocks to the north of the former World Trade Center Towers, in a plaza of its own, a building which is 1,527 feet high, with 125 stories. The building has a stainless steel facade, with tinted green windows.

=== Morning ===
In the morning mail, Will Giddings, "Clerk Of The Works," or on-site representative of the owner, "The World Tower Corporation," receives an anonymous envelope containing electrical-design change authorizations that no one in the offices of Caldwell Associates, Supervising Architects (represented on-site by Nathan Hale "Nat" Wilson) or Bertrand McGraw And Company, General Contractor, has seen before. These changes, as it proves, call for lower-quality material, simplified circuitry, or both; this would reduce costs for the electrical subcontractor, Paul Simmons, son-in-law of Bert McGraw, the general contractor, while eliminating the electrical-safety elements in the wiring of the building and rendering it sub-standard. The various characters start to track things down, involving the electrical engineer's office and the Fire Department, represented by Assistant Fire Commissioner Timothy O'Reilly Brown. The reader is told that Simmons's company, having been on the verge of financial ruin because of a poorly bid electrical contract for the World Tower Building, reversed its fortunes beginning with the first of the change orders. His secretary proves not to have destroyed the originals, enabling her to copy them for Giddings.

=== Afternoon ===
In the afternoon, the grand-opening celebration for the building commences and the 125th-floor Tower Room is filled with high-profile guests from Congress, the U.N., Hollywood, and the Mayor's office. During the affair, while various authorities are arguing over the change orders and the possibility of evacuating the Tower Room, a disgruntled sheet-metal worker named John Connors, who has no idea of the sub-standard condition of the building's electrical systems, detonates a stolen bomb in the sub-basement transformer room of the giant building in order to disrupt the event and discredit the building and its owners. Connors, it is revealed, had gone over the edge mentally three years before, when his diabetic wife, in the throes of diabetic ketoacidosis, was thrown into the police station "drunk tank," where she was deprived of medication, killing her. The incident had been poorly investigated, and Connors, who had done sheet-metal work on the Tower months before the day of the grand opening, but had been dismissed, sought revenge. He managed to gain entry by bluffing his way past the two police officers guarding the site, who had not received orders to keep people out.

=== Disaster ===
While Connors had masqueraded as an electrician to bluff his way inside, and most likely did not actually intend to kill anyone in the "Tower Room," he is ignorant of the high voltages that power the huge building: 13,800 volts from the Consolidated Edison substation. The explosion his stolen bomb triggers not only electrocutes him "like a piece of bacon," but also cripples the transformers designed to reduce the voltage to usable levels and causes fires to erupt throughout the building, disabling the elevators and trapping the guests in the Tower Room on the top floor of the skyscraper. When the doors to the fire stairs are found to be blocked by heavy crates containing radio and television equipment for the antenna mast, a rescue attempt is made by rigging auxiliary power to an express elevator. But this fails as the elevator's single occupant (who sneaked into it prematurely) is killed by the tremendous heat generated by the "flue effect" in the building's central core. A breeches buoy line is then shot from a helicopter and rigged to the adjacent World Trade Center's north tower. But the chair device is only partially successful, rescuing all 49 women but only 28 of the 54 men still in the Tower Room; in the end, the people trapped in the World Tower Building are burned to death when the fires reach the top of the building.
