= Sarah Nean Bruce =

American film director

Sarah Nean Bruce is an American film & television movie producer, director and writer. She was born in Seattle, Washington and resides in Hollywood, California.

== Career ==
Bruce was co-executive producer on the sci-fi noir film Yesterday Was a Lie, the Hallmark Channel film Where There's A Will (Love, Clyde) starring Marion Ross, and the Hallmark romantic comedy The Family Plan, starring Tori Spelling, Greg Germann and Abigail Breslin. She also directed the thriller/horror feature film Bram Stoker's Way of The Vampire, which was released worldwide, the dramatic ensemble piece The Marriage Undone. She was a co-writer of the horror/thriller feature script Witches of Beverly Hills for Regent Entertainment. Finally, she co-produced the documentary feature Stone's Edge by Michael Tobias about Oliver Stone (which Stone authorized).

Bruce's past experience includes work as Executive VP of Development / Creative Affairs at White Rose Entertainment owned by executive producer John D. Schofield. She served as film commissioner/assistant director in North Texas for the DFW Regional Film Commission where she acted as liaison and production advisor on Dr. T & the Women, Any Given Sunday, Boys Don't Cry, Universal Soldier: The Return, The X-Files: Fight the Future and Armageddon. She also served as supervising and consulting producer for the 1997, 1998, and 1999 Lone Star Film and Television Awards.

As a consultant for New Regency Films, she worked on Pretty Woman, The Power of One, That Night, and Under Siege.

At the pioneering audio company Spherical Sound (prototype for 5.1 surround sound), she worked on projects with Mick Fleetwood's ZOO, Michael Jackson, and personally received an RIAA Multi-Platinum Record Award for her work with Pink Floyd on A Momentary Lapse of Reason.
