= Frank M. Robinson =

American science fiction writer (1926–2014)

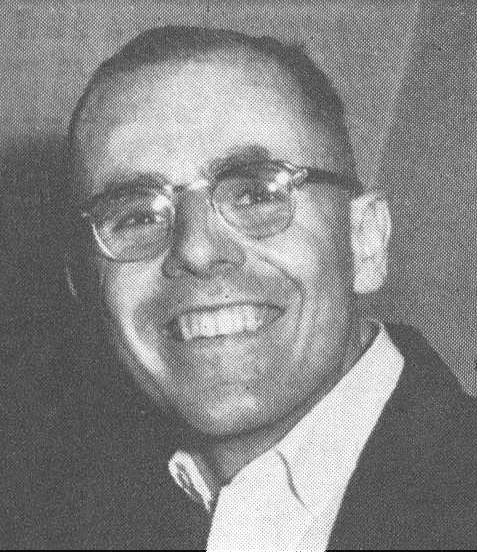
- Frank M Robinson c.1955
- Born: Frank Malcolm Robinson; August 9, 1926; Chicago, Illinois, U.S.
- Died: June 30, 2014 (aged 87); San Francisco, California, U.S.

Frank Malcolm Robinson (August 9, 1926 – June 30, 2014) was an American science fiction and techno-thriller writer. He was a speechwriter for gay politician Harvey Milk and Milk's designated successor in the event of his death but declined to be appointed to or run for office.

== Biography ==
Born in Chicago, Illinois. Robinson was the son of a check forger. He started out in his teens working as a copy boy for International News Service and then became an office boy for Ziff Davis. He was drafted into the Navy for World War II, and when his tour was over attended Beloit College, where he majored in physics, graduating in 1950. He could find no work as a writer, so he ended up back in the Navy and serving in Korea, where he kept writing and reading, as well as publishing in Astounding magazine.

After the Navy, he attended graduate school in journalism, then worked for a Chicago-based Sunday supplement. Soon he switched to Science Digest, where he worked from 1956 to 1959. From there, he moved into men's magazines: Rogue (1959–65) and Cavalier (1965–66). In 1969, Playboy asked him to take over the Playboy Advisor column. He remained there, without revealing that he was gay, until 1973, when he left to write full-time.

After moving to San Francisco in the 1970s, Robinson was a speechwriter for gay politician Harvey Milk; he had a small role in the film Milk. After Milk's assassination, Robinson was co-executor, with Scott Smith, of Milk's last will and testament.

Robinson was the author of 16 books, the editor of two others, and penned numerous articles. Three of his novels have been made into films. The Power (1956) was a supernatural science fiction and government conspiracy novel about people with superhuman skills, filmed in 1968 as The Power. The technothriller The Glass Inferno, co-written with Thomas N. Scortia, was combined with Richard Martin Stern's The Tower to produce the 1974 feature film The Towering Inferno. The Gold Crew, also co-written with Scortia, was a nuclear threat thriller filmed as an NBC miniseries and re-titled The Fifth Missile.

He collaborated on several other works with Scortia, including The Prometheus Crisis, The Nightmare Factor, and Blow-Out. More recent works include The Dark Beyond the Stars (1991), and an updated version of The Power (2000), which closely followed Waiting (1999), a novel with similar themes to The Power. His novel is a medical thriller about organ theft called The Donor.

In the 1970s, Robinson started seriously collecting the vintage pulp-fiction magazines that he had grown up reading. The collection spawned a book on the history of the pulps as seen through their vivid cover art: Pulp Culture: The Art of Fiction Magazines (with co-author Lawrence Davidson). He attended numerous pulp conventions and in 2000 won the Lamont Award for lifetime achievement at Pulpcon.

In 2009 he was inducted into the Chicago Gay and Lesbian Hall of Fame.

== Works ==
=== Novels ===
- The Power (1956)
- The Glass Inferno (1974, with Thomas N. Scortia)
- The Prometheus Crisis (1975, with Thomas N. Scortia)
- The Nightmare Factor (1978, with Thomas N. Scortia)
- The Gold Crew (1980, with Thomas N. Scortia)
- The Great Divide (1982, with John F. Levin)
- Blow-Out! (1987, with Thomas N. Scortia)
- The Dark Beyond the Stars (1991)
- Death of a Marionette (1995, with Paul Hull)
- Waiting (1999)
- The Donor (2004)

=== Short story collections ===
- A Life in the Day of... and Other Short Stories (1981). Contains 9 short stories:
  - "The Maze" (1950)
  - "The Reluctant Heroes" (1951). Novelette
  - "The Fire and the Sword" (1951). Novelette
  - "The Santa Claus Planet" (1951). Novelette
  - "The Hunting Season" (1951). Novelette
  - "The Wreck of the Ship John B." (1967). Novelette
  - ""East Wind, West Wind"" (1972). Novelette
  - "A Life in the Day of..." (1969)
  - "Downhill All the Way" (1974)
- Through My Glasses Darkly, Edited by Robin Wayne Bailey (2002). Contains 5 short stories:
  - "Causes" (1997). Novelette
  - ""East Wind, West Wind"" (1972). Novelette
  - "The Hunting Season" (1951). Novelette
  - "A Life in the Day Of..." (1969)
  - "Hail, Hail, Rock and Roll" (1994)

=== Short stories ===
Uncollected short stories.

- "Situation Thirty" (1951)
- "Two Weeks in August" (1951)
- "Beyond the Ultra-Violet" (1951)
- "Good Luck, Columbus!" (1951)
- "Untitled Story" (1951). Novelette
- "You've Got to Believe" (1951)
- "The Girls from Earth" (1952). Novelette
- "Viewpoint" (1953)
- "The Night Shift" (1953)
- "Muscle Man" (1953)
- "Quiz Game" (1953)
- "The Day the World Ended" (1953)
- "Decision" (1953)
- "Guaranteed - Forever!" (1953)
- "The Siren Sounds at Midnight" (1953)
- "Planted!, AKA The Observer" (1953)
- "Quarter in the Slot" (1954)
- "The Lonely Man" (1954)
- "The Worlds of Joe Shannon" (1954)
- "One Thousand Miles Up" (1954)
- "The Oceans Are Wide" (1954). Novelette
- "The Dead End Kids of Space" (1954). Novelette
- "Cosmic Saboteur" (1955). Novelette
- "Dream Street" (1955)
- "Four Hours to Eternity" (1955)
- "You Don't Walk Alone" (1955)
- "Wanted: One Sane Man" (1955). Novelette
- "A Rover I Will Be" (1960)
- "Merry Christmas, No. 30267" (1993)
- "The Greatest Dying" (1993)
- "1969 Hail, Hail, Rock and Roll" (1994)
- "Dealer's Choice" (1994)
- "One Month in 1907" (1994) (collected in Mike Resnick's alternate history anthology Alternate Outlaws)
- "The Phantom of the Barbary Coast" (1995). Novelette
- "Infallibility, Obedience, and Acts of Contrition" (1997) (collected in Mike Resnick's alternate history anthology Alternate Tyrants)
- "Love Story" (2003)
- "The Errand Boy" (2010). Novelette

=== Poems ===
- The Nether Gardens (1945)

=== Nonfiction ===
Autobiographies

- Not So Good a Gay Man: A Memoir (2017)

Guides

- Pulp Culture: The Art of Fiction Magazines (1998, with Lawrence Davidson)
- Science Fiction of the 20th Century: An Illustrated History (1999)

Self Help

- Therapeutic Re-Creation: Ideas and Experiences (1974)
- A Holistic Perspective on the Disabled Child: Applications in Camping, Recreation, and Community Life (1985)
- Coping+plus: Dimensions of Disability (1995, with Dwight Woodworth Jr., Doe West)
