= Thomas N. Scortia =

American novelist (1926–1986)

Thomas Nicholas Scortia (August 29, 1926 – April 29, 1986) was an American science fiction author. He collaborated on several works with fellow author Frank M. Robinson. He sometimes used the pseudonyms "Scott Nichols", "Gerald MacDow", and "Arthur R. Kurtz".

== Biography ==
Scortia was born in Alton, Illinois. He attended Washington University in St. Louis, where he earned a degree in chemistry in 1949. He worked for a number of aerospace companies during the 1950s and 1960s/early 1970s, and held a patent for the fuel used by one of the Jupiter fly-by missions.

Scortia had been writing in his spare time while still working in the aerospace field. When the industry began to see increased unemployment in the early 1970s, Scortia decided to try his hand at full-time writing. His novel, The Glass Inferno (in collaboration with Frank M. Robinson) was, in combination with the novel The Tower by Richard Martin Stern, the basis for the 1974 film The Towering Inferno. Scortia also collaborated with Dalton Trumbo on the novel The Endangered Species.

Scortia died in La Verne, California on April 29, 1986, while being treated for leukemia.

Harlan Ellison credited Scortia with having "literally saved [Ellison] from being courtmartialed back in 1958".

== Works ==
=== Novels ===
- Blowout (1987) (with Frank M. Robinson)
- The Gold Crew (1980) (with Frank M. Robinson)
- The Nightmare Factor (1978) (with Frank M. Robinson)
- The Prometheus Crisis (1975) (with Frank M. Robinson)
- The Glass Inferno (1974) (with Frank M. Robinson)
- Earthwreck! (1974)
- Artery of Fire (1972)
- What Mad Oracle?: A Novel of the World As It Is (1961)

=== Collections ===
- The best of Thomas N. Scortia (1981) edited by George Zebrowski
- Caution: Inflammable (1976) introduction by Theodore Sturgeon

=== Short stories ===
- "The Shores of Night" (1956)
- "Sea Change" (1956)
- "The Bomb in the Bathtub" Galaxy, Feb 1957
- "The Icebox Blonde" (1959)
- ”The Weariest River” (1973)
