= The Glass Inferno =

1974 American novel

- First edition (h/b)
- Author: Thomas N. Scortia and Frank M. Robinson
- Language: English
- Genre: Fiction
- Publisher: Doubleday (h/b 1974); Pocket Books (p/b 1974); Zebra (1982)
- Publication date: 1974
- Publication place: United States
- Media type: Paperback
- ISBN: 0-89083-984-0 (ISBN 978-0890839843)
- OCLC: 43026686

The Glass Inferno is a 1974 novel by American writer Thomas N. Scortia and Frank M. Robinson. It is one of the two books that was used to create the movie The Towering Inferno, the other being the 1973 novel The Tower by Richard Martin Stern.

== Plot summary ==
The story concerns the events over the course of a single evening in a recently completed 66-story building in an unnamed American city. The building is called the National Curtainwall Building, nicknamed the Glass House, the headquarters of the fictitious National Curtainwall corporation. A combination of a skyscraper built to the absolute minimum compliance with safety rules, combined with cutting corners to save money on construction, leads to a disaster waiting to happen.

Craig Barton, the building’s architect, is to meet for dinner with the building’s owner, Wyndom Leroux, in the building’s Promenade room. During drinks and dinner Barton questions Leroux regarding the specifications of the building and whether or not they have been altered from his original plans, why they have been altered and what the consequences of this may be. After dinner they are alerted by the hostess that there is a fire in one of the building’s storage rooms on the 17th floor. Barton is sent down by Leroux to assist with the firefighting operations while his wife, Jenny, remains at dinner with Leroux and his wife Thelma.

A small home furnishings store owner, despondent over his near bankruptcy, decides to burn his business down for the insurance. He tries to do so, but realizes what it will do to his business partner and lover, Larry. He puts out the fire but realizes that he's now really ruined because of what he has done. He then discovers that he is smelling smoke which is not from the fire he tried to set, but is from a real fire, unrelated to his, that has occurred in the building.

A part of the story deals with a TV reporter named Quantrell, who, using a disgruntled former employee of the contractor, was given copies of documents relating to the building's construction. In one scene, Quantrell uses them on his television show to point out how the building was designed in violation of local building codes at the time the drawings were made, and that the local building codes were changed afterward to allow the design to be in compliance, implying that the owners of the building paid bribes to have the building codes rewritten. The reporter gets threats from all sides to back down on his aggressive reporting of the building's failures.

After the initial alarm of fire, division chief Mario Infantino, a chief who specializes in high-rise fires, is called to the scene and given the overall command by fire chief Karl Fuchs, whose son, Mark, is also a fireman at the scene. Barton and Infantino, who have been friends before the fire, work to understand what is happening to the building as flames race through its poorly constructed heart.

The story continues as it shows the efforts of other residents of the building — including the brave Lisolette — attempting to escape the flames, some successful, some not. Eventually a number of people end up in the penthouse restaurant of the building, where they are trapped and unable to get down. They are eventually rescued successfully by helicopter.

The fire is eventually put out by blowing up water tanks below the roof of the building, which causes the water to drown the fire.
