= Two Dollar Radio =

American independent family-run publisher

- Founded: 2005; 21 years ago
- Founder: Eric Obenauf; Eliza Wood-Obenauf; Brian Obenauf
- Country of origin: United States
- Headquarters location: Columbus, Ohio
- Distribution: Publishers Group West (USA); Turnaround Publisher Services (UK)
- Fiction genres: Literary fiction & micro-budget film
- Owners: Seven Stories Press (2025-present)
- Official website: www.twodollarradio.com; www.twodollarradiohq.com

Two Dollar Radio is a family-run independent publisher based in Columbus, Ohio.

Specializing in literary fiction, it was founded in 2005 by husband-and-wife team Eric Obenauf and Eliza Jane Wood-Obenauf, with Brian Obenauf. In 2013, they launched their micro-budget film division, Two Dollar Radio "Moving Pictures."

In 2017 they co-founded the annual Columbus, Ohio, arts festival The Flyover Fest. In September, the press opened a brick-and-mortar named Two Dollar Radio Headquarters on the south side of Columbus, Ohio, which is a bookstore, full bar, performance space, and vegan coffeehouse and cafe, carrying Two Dollar Radio titles as well as a selection of almost exclusively independently published books.

In April 2025, Two Dollar Radio was acquired by Seven Stories Press, becoming the New York-based independent publisher’s fourth imprint. The press remains independent, with Eric Obenauf and Eliza Jane Wood-Obenauf retaining their editor roles. Obenauf and Wood-Obenauf retain ownership of Two Dollar Radio Headquarters.

== History ==
In 2008, the publishers were profiled as part of Publishers Weekly's 50 Under 40 series, which profiled young publishers.

The Brooklyn Rail credits the press with publishing "some of the finest work of contemporary fiction," while Publishing Perspectives called them "a budding literary movement." Popular literature website HTML Giant calls Two Dollar Radio "the hippest, most adventuresome publisher in the United States."

The press occasionally works with outside artists on jacket designs. Esteemed NYC artist Barbara Kruger designed the cover to Gary Indiana’s seventh novel, The Shanghai Gesture, published in April 2009. Photographer Lynn Davis provided the cover photographs for her husband Rudolph Wurlitzer’s four novels that the press has published. San Francisco-based collage artist, Aubrey Rhodes designed the jacket for Joshua Mohr’s second novel, Termite Parade, published in July 2010. Two works of art by Mat Brinkman were used in The Orange Eats Creeps — one on the cover and one as a frontispiece. Two works of art by Michael Salerno of Kiddiepunk were used in Mira Corpora, on the front and back covers, as well as frontispiece and end piece. Ricardo Cavolo's ink-on-paper piece, 1937, is featured on the cover of How to Get Into the Twin Palms.

Two Dollar Radio is distributed in the US and Canada by PGW, and in the UK by Turnaround Publisher Services.

== Publishing ==
Authors published by Two Dollar Radio include Rudolph Wurlitzer, Jay Neugeboren, Gary Indiana, Shane Jones, Scott Bradfield, Amy Koppelman, Lawrence Shainberg, Francis Levy, Anthony Neil Smith, Joshua Mohr, Xiaoda Xiao, Grace Krilanovich, Barbara Browning, Scott Bradfield, Trinie Dalton, Jeff Jackson, Bennett Sims, Scott McClanahan, Anne-Marie Kinney, Karolina Waclawiak, among others.

The press has reissued three Rudolph Wurlitzer novels, Nog, Flats, and Quake and published Wurlitzer's first novel in 24 years, The Drop Edge of Yonder. The book was named Best Book of 2008 by Time Out New York, won Foreword Magazine's Book of the Year Gold Medal in Literary Fiction, and was a Believer magazine Reader’s Choice Top-20 Pick.

1940, award-winning novelist Jay Neugeboren's first new novel in two decades, was on the long list for the 2010 International Dublin Literary Award.

Francis Levy's debut novel, Erotomania: A Romance, was a Queerty Top 10 Book of 2008 and named a Standout Book of the Year by Inland Empire Weekly.

Joshua Mohr's first novel, Some Things That Meant the World to Me, was one of O: The Oprah Magazine's 10 Terrific Reads of 2009, a Huffington Post Best Small Press Book of the Year, a Nervous Breakdown Best Book of 2009, and a San Francisco Chronicle best-seller. His second novel, Termite Parade, was a New York Times Book Review Editors' Choice.

Grace Krilanovich, author of The Orange Eats Creeps, was selected as a National Book Foundation 2010 "5 Under 35" Honoree (selected by Scott Spencer, Fiction Finalist for A Ship Made of Paper, 2003; Fiction Finalist for Endless Love, 1980 and 1981). The Orange Eats Creeps was selected as one of Amazon.com's Best Books of 2010 in the category of Science Fiction & Fantasy, was named a Top 10 Book of 2010 by Shelf Unbound, was a NPR Best Books of 2010, and a The Believer Book Award Finalist in 2010.

Barbara Browning's debut novel, The Correspondence Artist, won a Lambda Literary Award and an Independent Books Publishers Award for Literary Fiction, while her second novel, I'm Trying to Reach You, was a The Believer Book Award Finalist in 2012.

Bennett Sims' debut novel, A Questionable Shape, won the Bard Fiction Prize for 2014, awarded by Bard College.

Sarah Rose Etter's 2019 novel The Book of X was longlisted for the Believer Book Award.

== Film ==
In 2013, the company announced the formation of a micro-budget film division, Two Dollar Radio Moving Pictures, an expansion that the Tribeca Film Festival speculated could be "a real watershed moment in film."

The initial three films in pre-production are I'm Not Patrick, written and to be directed by the company's editorial director, Eric Obenauf, The Removals, written by Nicholas Rombes and to be directed by Grace Krilanovich, and The Greenbrier Ghost, written by and to be directed by Scott McClanahan and Chris Oxley, based upon the true story of the Greenbrier Ghost.
