= Heinrich Bender (conductor) =

German conductor and pianist

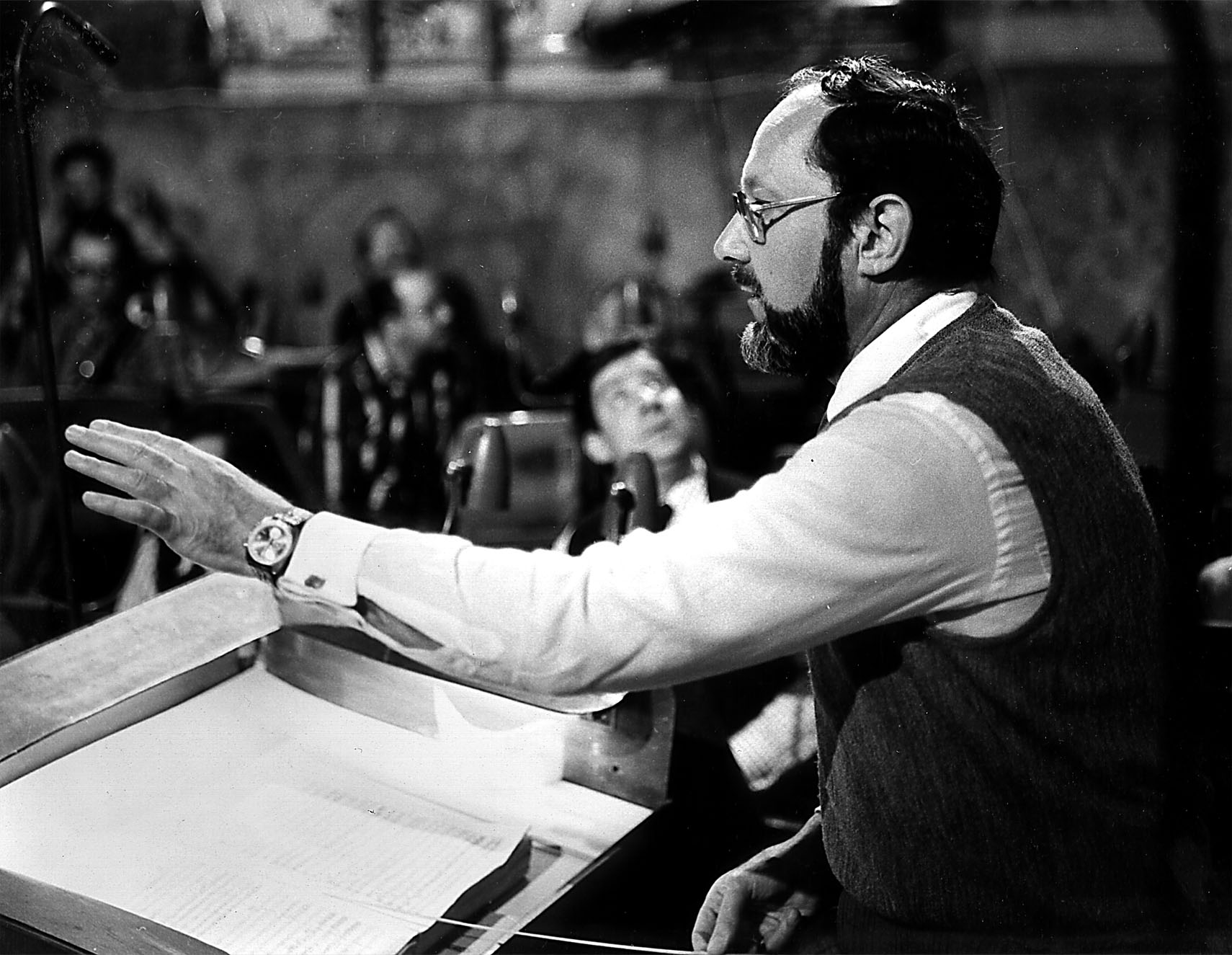
Heinrich Bender (circa 1980)

Heinrich Bender, real name Heinrich Maul, (11 May 1925 – 24 May 2016) was a German conductor, pianist and music teacher. He went down in recent interpretive history primarily as Bavarian State Kapellmeister, Principal Conductor at the Munich National Theatre and Director of the Studio of the Bavarian State Opera Munich.

== Life and career ==
Bender came from Saarbrücken, where his father was violist in the municipal orchestra. He grew up in a bourgeois environment conducive to education and the arts, learned to play the piano at an early age, took part in house and chamber concerts as a child and performed in solo piano recitals at the age of ten. He took the so-called Notabitur at the Ludwigsgymnasium in Saarbrücken in 1943 and then did his military service. While attending school, he received lessons in piano playing and harmony from Heinz Bongartz, then general music director of the Theater Saarbrücken.

After the end of the war, Bender found work in a machine factory after completing his schooling. In 1946, he got his first job as a répétiteur at the Theater Saarbrücken. A year later, he was able to continue his studies with Bongartz, who in the meantime had become a professor at the Leipzig Academy of Music as head of the conducting class. In addition to his studies in all subjects relevant to a Kapellmeister, he acquired extensive knowledge of symphonic and operatic practice with Bongartz.

After studying with Bongartz, he moved to the Hochschule für Musik in Berlin-Charlottenburg, where he studied composition with Boris Blacher, piano with Gerhard Puchelt and conducting with Felix Lederer. In the autumn of 1949, he took up his first engagement as a conductor (répétiteur with conducting duties) at the Landestheater Coburg. There, as an opera conductor at a multi-discipline ensemble theatre, he was able to develop an extensive repertoire and establish contacts with singers, orchestra musicians, fellow conductors and theatre professionals of all kinds. At the same time, he completed a degree in musicology at the University of Erlangen–Nuremberg.

In 1955 he was engaged as musical assistant to the Bayreuth Festival, where he was able to work for years with the Wagner brothers and important conductors such as Knappertsbusch, Keilberth, Cluytens. In 1957, he went to the Stadttheater Hagen/Westphalia as 1st Kapellmeister. In 1959, at the instigation of Joseph Keilberth, he was called to the Bavarian State Opera in Munich. There, he advanced to the position of Bavarian State Kapellmeister. Bender remained active in the Bavarian capital until the end of his career, in effect as permanent first conductor alongside music director Joseph Keilberth, Wolfgang Sawallisch and Zubin Mehta. At the same time, he was active as an opera and concert conductor, as a Lied pianist and at home and abroad, as a guest at the Berlin State Opera as well as at the Deutsche Oper Berlin (Salome) and at the Vienna State Opera (Die Entführung aus dem Serail, La Cenerentola, Lulu). In 1961, he conducted the world premiere of Hans Werner Henze's Elegy for Young Lovers at the Schwetzingen Festival. At the Bavarian State Opera, he conducted, among other things, the German premiere of the burlesque-comic opera Le convenienze ed inconvenienze teatrali by Gaetano Donizetti. He did not take up an offer to move to Dresden as general music director after a guest performance at the Semperoper, as it was tied to the acceptance of GDR citizenship. In 1969, he accepted the position of chief conductor of the German repertoire at the Canadian Opera Company, where he conducted the German productions with the Toronto Symphony Orchestra up to and including 1976. From 1969 onwards, he also held the position of Studio Director at the Bavarian State Opera for three decades and conducted 90 opera performances with its master students.

Bender died on 24 May 2016 in Munich at the age of 91.

== Positions and activities ==
Bender was responsible for a repertoire of works without limits. Critics described him as one of the "last representatives of a dying species" (Marcel Prawy) - the universally educated, masterfully interpreting universalist who was perfectly up to every task ad hoc "off the cuff". Bender was almost a legend as an orchestra conductor in Munich until the 1990s. The effects of his pedagogical work as director of the Munich Opera Studio can hardly be measured: Most of the 200 or so graduates of this opera school went on to careers at German state theatres and European opera houses. Bender's most successful students include Agnes Baltsa, Roland Bracht, Kevin Conners, Isoldé Elchlepp, Daphne Evangelatos, Marcus Goritzki, Ingrid Haubold, Markus Hollop, Andreas Kohn, Robert Künzli, Petra Lang, Juan José Lopera, Ralf Lukas, Georg Paucker, Alfred Reiter, Christoph Stephinger, Rüdiger Trebes, Andrea Trauboth, Violeta Urmana, Deon van der Walt, Kobie van Rensburg, Irmgard Vilsmaier, Roland Wagenführer, and Yaron Windmüller.

Bender's musical productions are only insufficiently published on recordings, but are variously documented in radio archives. The Hamburg Archive for the Art of Singing has been publishing recordings of opera performances under Bender's direction since 2010.

== Publications ==
- Die Gliederung der Mundarten um Marburg a. d. Lahn

== Recordings ==
- Musikausschnitte zur Biographie / Werke von Wagner, R.Strauss, Debussy, Prokofiev, Hindemith, Hartmann, Henze, H.Bender + Barbershop-Songs / Anhang-CD zum Printwerk (s. o.)
- Recital Nicolai Gedda: Arien + Szenen aus Opern / Bayerisches Staatsorchester / Deutscher Schallplattenpreis (EMI Electrola)
- Lieder-Recital Astrid Varnay / Wagner, Dvořák, Respighi (MYTO)
- Portrait-Edition Karl Christian Kohn: Gluck, Wagner, Mussorgskij, Wolf-Ferrari, Orff/Monteverdi, Henze (1962–1990) Hamburger Archiv
- Portrait-Edition Thomas Tipton: Donizetti, Verdi, Puccini (1965–1977) Hamburger Archiv
- Hans Werner Henze / Elegie für junge Liebende (1961) Hamburger Archiv
- Christoph Willibald Gluck / Die Pilger von Mekka (1962) Hamburger Archiv
- Giuseppe Verdi / Don Carlos (1965) / Hamburger Archiv
- Gaetano Donizetti / Le convenienze ed inconvenienze teatrali / Dt. EA 1969) Hamburger Archiv
- Gaetano Donizetti / Anna Bolena (1967) Hamburger Archiv

== Honours ==
- 1993: Bundesverdienstkreuz
- 1997: Bayerischer Verdienstorden
