= Elegy for Young Lovers =

Opera by Hans Werner Henze

Elegy for Young Lovers Elegie für junge Liebende
- Opera by Hans Werner Henze
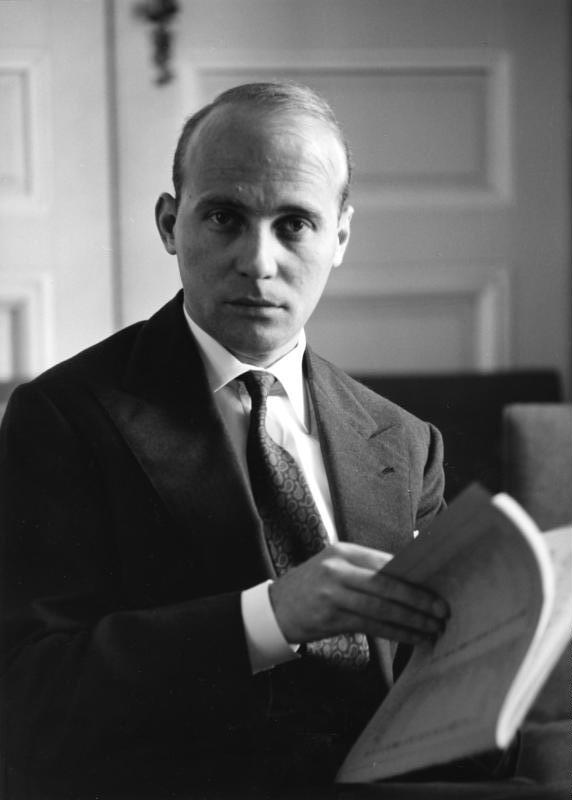
- The composer in 1960
- Librettist: W. H. Auden; Chester Kallman
- Premiere: 20 May 1961; Schlosstheater Schwetzingen

Elegy for Young Lovers (German: Elegie für junge Liebende) is an opera in three acts by Hans Werner Henze to an English libretto by W. H. Auden and Chester Kallman.

== Background ==
The opera was first performed in a German translation by Louis, Prince of Hesse and by Rhine at the Schlosstheater Schwetzingen at the Schwetzingen Festival on 20 May 1961, conducted by Heinrich Bender. The first performance using the original English text was in Glyndebourne, also in 1961. The Juilliard Opera Center produced the opera in New York City in 1965, with the composer conducting. Henze revised the opera in 1987, and this revised version received its first performance on 28 October 1988 at the La Fenice, Venice, with Markus Stenz conducting.

According to Ann Saddlemyer in her book Becoming George: The Life of Mrs. W. B. Yeats (2002), the poet is partially based on W. B. Yeats, and his wife "George" (Georgie Hyde-Lees) was the inspiration for both the secretary and the woman with visions. David Anderson has noted that the poet also portrays Auden as well. Robert Henderson has summarised the thesis of the opera as follows:

Elegy for Young Lovers... is a bitter indictment of the Romantic notion of the artist as hero, feeding remorselessly on those around him both in the name of art and to satisfy his own monstrous and inhumanely egotistical appetites.

Auden and Kallman described this opera as their equivalent of Richard Strauss' opera Arabella. The dedication of the opera is to the memory of Hugo von Hofmannsthal.

Henze quoted material from the aria My own, my own in his Fifth Symphony, completed in 1962.

== Roles ==
Roles, voice types, premiere cast
Role	Voice type	Premiere cast, 20 May 1961 Conductor: Heinrich Bender
Hilde Mack, a widow	coloratura soprano	Eva Maria Rogner
Elisabeth Zimmer	soprano	Ingeborg Bremert
Carolina, Countess of Kirchstätten, secretary to Mittenhofer	contralto	Lilian Benningsen
Toni Reischmann	tenor	Friedrich Lenz
Gregor Mittenhofer, a poet	baritone	Dietrich Fischer-Dieskau
Dr. Wilhelm Reischmann, a physician	bass	Karl-Christian Kohn
Josef Mauer, a mountain climb leader	spoken	Hubert Hilten

== Synopsis ==
The opera is set in an inn called Der Schwarze Adler in the Austrian Alps in 1910. The plot is centred on a poet, Gregor Mittenhofer, who manipulates the people in the inn to provide inspiration to his work, his faithful secretary, his doctor, his young "muse" Elisabeth and a hysterical woman who lost her husband to the mountains decades before and has visions. When a young man arrives who attracts Elisabeth, Mittenhofer lets her go but does not act to prevent the young lovers' death in a snowstorm in the mountains, using the tragedy as the inspiration for a final "Elegie" of pure music, sung without words.

== Recordings ==
- Liane Dubin (Elisabeth Zimmer), Catherine Gayer (Hilda Mack), Martha Mödl (Carolina Gräfin von Kirchstetten), Loren Driscoll (Toni Reischmann), Dietrich Fischer-Dieskau (Gregor Mittenhofer), Radio-Symphonie-Orchester Berlin, Henze conducting, in German, 1963 DG
- Richard Lloyd-Morgan (Mittenhofer), Regina Schudel (Hilda Mack), Aurelia Hajek (Carolina), Silvia Weiss (Elisabeth), Bruno Fath (Toni Reischmann), Orchestra of the Berliner Kammeroper, Brynmor Llewelyn Jones, conductor, 1989 Deutsche Schallplatten DS (live in Berlin)
- Lisa Saffer (Hilda Mack), Rosemary Hardy (Elizabeth Zimmer), Mary King (Carolina von Kirchstetten), Christopher Gillett (Toni Reischmann), Roderick Kennedy (Dr. Wilhelm Reischmann), David Wilson-Johnson (Gregor Mittenhofer), Adrian Brine (Josef Mauer), Schönberg Ensemble, Live recording Concertgebouw, Amsterdam, 27 September 2000, conductor: Oliver Knussen. 2CD is part of the Schönberg Ensemble Edition box (A Century of Music in Perspective).
- Jami Rogers (Hilda Mack), Valdine Anderson (Elizabeth Zimmer), Deborah Milnes-Johnson (Carolina von Kirchstetten), Thomas Randle (Toni Reischmann), Peter Klaveness (Dr. Wilhelm Reischmann), Roderick Williams (Gregor Mittenhofer), David Wilson-Johnson (Josef Mauer); Paris, Maison de Radio France, Salle Olivier Messiaen. Concert performance: Saturday 28 May 2005. Broadcast: France Musique, Saturday 4 June 2005
