= Perez Hilton =

American blogger (born 1978)

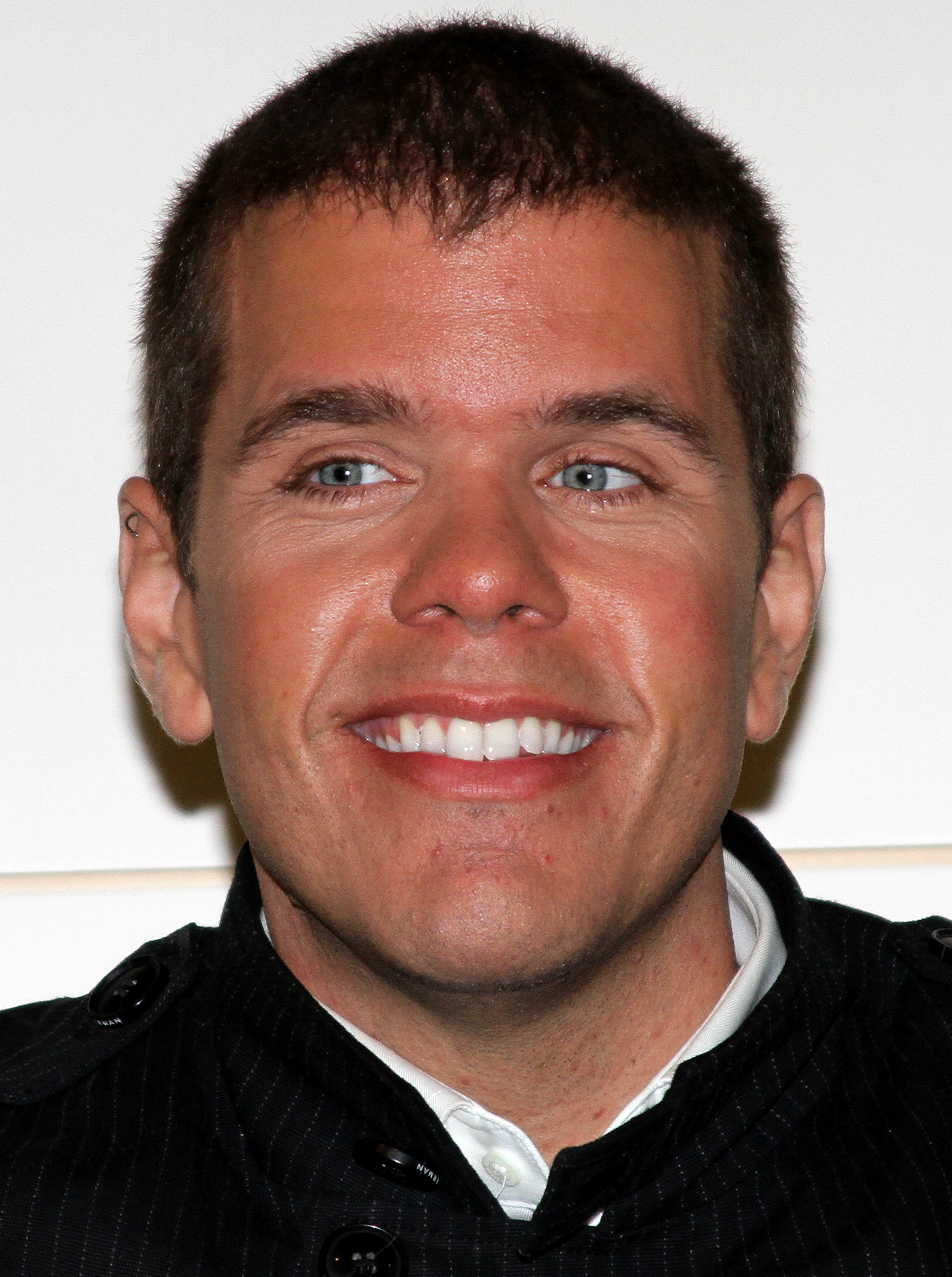
- Hilton in 2011
- Born: Mario Armando Lavandeira Jr. March 23, 1978 (age 48); Miami, Florida, U.S.
- Education: New York University
- Occupations: Blogger; columnist; media personality
- Years active: 2001–present
- Television: Perez Hilton Superfan; Celebrity Big Brother; Worst Cooks in America
- Children: 3
- Website: perezhilton.com

Mario Armando Lavandeira Jr. (born March 23, 1978), known professionally as Perez Hilton, is an American blogger, columnist, and media personality. His blog is known for posts covering gossip items about celebrities, and for posting tabloid photos over which he has added his own captions or "doodles". The blog has received controversy for its attitude, its former practice of outing alleged closeted celebrities, and its role in the increasing coverage of celebrities in all forms of media.

Besides blogging, Hilton has written four books, hosts a podcast with Chris Booker, has two YouTube channels, has appeared in various films and television shows, and has acted in two off-Broadway shows.

== Early life ==
Mario Armando Lavandeira Jr. was born on March 23, 1978, in Miami, to Cuban parents. He grew up in Little Havana and Westchester, Florida; he attended Belen Jesuit Preparatory School, an all-boys Catholic school in Miami. Hilton graduated in 1996, and the aspiring actor received a scholarship to New York University in Manhattan, New York.

== Blogging career ==
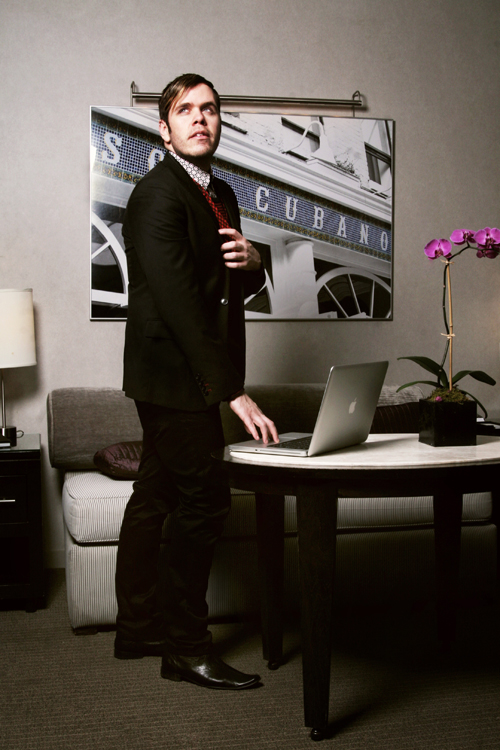
A publicity photograph seen on PerezHilton.com, July 2009

After graduating from New York University in 2000 and before beginning a career in blogging, Hilton attempted to be an actor. He briefly was a media relations assistant for GLAAD, an LGBT rights organization, was a freelance writer for gay publications, worked as a receptionist for Urban Outings, a Manhattan gay events club, and briefly was the managing editor of Instinct, a gay men's magazine. He says he started blogging "because it seemed easy".

Hilton's angle on celebrity gossip includes an unapologetic desire to mingle with and be a part of celebrity culture. He often comments on celebrity awards shows, clubs, and private events he has attended, and posts photographs of himself with the celebrities he writes about under the "Personally Perez" category of his blog. Although Hilton has an affinity for some celebrities like Lady Gaga and Sophia Bush, he also has a "vendetta" against certain stars, such as Disney Channel star Vanessa Hudgens and Gossip Girl teen actress Taylor Momsen. Miley Cyrus once publicized her personal disapproval of Hilton via Twitter.

Some have suggested that Hilton's proximity to the celebrities about whom he writes has led to biased coverage on his blog. For example, he purports to have befriended Paris Hilton, the source of his stage name and frequent subject of his posts, and it has been noted that he rarely reports on stories or rumors casting Paris Hilton in a negative or unflattering light. In fact, unlike most gossip blogs, he often acknowledges and commends her positive achievements.

Hilton has been known to speak out publicly against discriminatory behavior of celebrities and other public figures. He called for the firing of Isaiah Washington from ABC television series Grey's Anatomy for making homophobic remarks and called for his readers to do the same. In early 2007, Hilton was criticized by The Hollywood Gossip blog for ignoring racist and homophobic remarks made by Paris Hilton. Hilton often promotes his favorite up-and-coming musicians by posting streams of their songs under the "Listen to This" category of his blog. London-based singer Mika's 2007 rise to popular success in North America has been partially attributed to Hilton's frequent support. Hilton and Mika also claim to be friends.

=== Blogging success ===
During a Cliché Magazine (June/July 2010) interview, Hilton said that he only started blogging as a hobby. "What set my site apart is that prior to PerezHilton.com, most blogs were mainly online journals and diaries, but that never interested me. I wanted to talk about celebrities because they're far more entertaining." On March 11, 2005, within the first six months of Hilton's blogging career, PageSixSixSix.com, the original name of his blog, was named "Hollywood's Most-Hated Website" by The Insider, catalyzing an initial surge in its popularity which temporarily crippled its server. Hilton claimed that on July 30, 2007, a seemingly "ordinary day", PerezHilton.com had over 8.82 million page views in a 24-hour period. Other sources dispute the reliability of Hilton's web traffic claims.

Pop singer Fergie confirmed that she is referring to Hilton in her song "Pedestal" (2006), in which she criticizes an unidentified person for making negative remarks about her online. On August 17, 2007, citing exclusive sources, Hilton announced the death of Cuban president Fidel Castro and claimed that he was the first media outlet in the world to break the news. Although Hilton claimed that U.S. officials would be making an announcement within hours, no announcement was made, and no major media outlets verified Castro's death. The Associated Press later determined that rumors were sparked by a meeting of Miami officials who were to discuss the city's plans when Castro dies. Rumors were further fueled by a road closure in the Florida Keys which was due to a police standoff. Castro appeared in an interview on Cuban television on September 21, 2007, "looking frail but sounding lucid", and mocking rumors of his death. On September 9, 2009, Perez appeared on The Tyra Banks Show and cited his premature reporting of Castro's death as his "one regret".

On September 15, 2008, Terra.com named Hilton the "Hispanic of the Year" in honor of Hispanic Heritage Month. In October 2014, the popularity of the site was trending slightly down, as PerezHilton.com was ranked by Alexa as the 1,234th most trafficked website globally.

== In the media ==
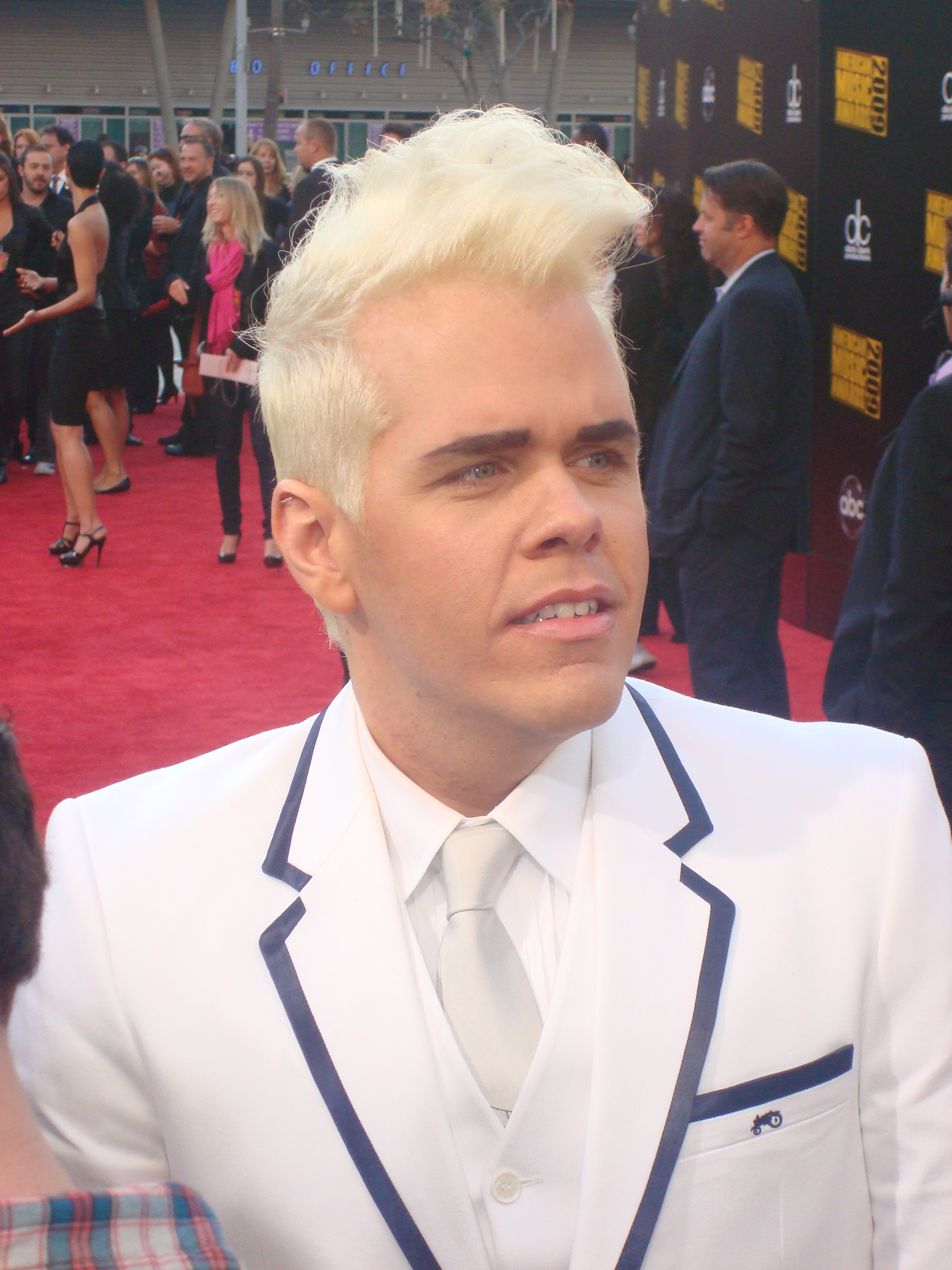
Hilton at the 2009 American Music Awards

=== Television ===
In 2001, Hilton made an appearance in the third episode of the third season of The Sopranos, "Fortunate Son". His character hands over the proceeds of a Jewel benefit concert at Rutgers University, whose ticket office Christopher Moltisanti and Benny Fazio rob at gunpoint.

In 2004, a then-206 lb (93 kg) Hilton appeared as a contestant on the "Madonna Style" episode of VH1's reality weight loss show, Flab To Fab. At the time, Hilton had 30% body fat and a 41 in (100 cm) waist. Hilton lost a total of 45 lb (20 kg) in three months and dropped 13 in (33 cm) around his waist, leaving him at 160 lb (73 kg) and a 28 in (71 cm) waist for his 6 ft (1.8 m) frame, and a greatly reduced level of body fat. On July 13, 2007, Hilton announced on the TV show The View that he would star in his own reality television show on VH1. The series of six one-hour episodes, titled What Perez Sez, aired its first part on September 11, 2007.

Hilton appeared as a contestant on MTV's Celebrity Rap Superstar, which debuted August 30, 2007. He was eliminated in week six of the contest by judges' vote. On September 29, 2007, he hosted a Best of MADtv episode featuring pop culture parody sketches from previous seasons. He has appeared in music videos such as Simple Plan's "When I'm Gone", The Pussycat Dolls's "Hush Hush", Rihanna's "S&M" and in the video of the Latin music Anahí and Christian Chávez "Libertad".

Hilton has appeared in reality shows including Victoria Beckham: Coming to America, MTV Cribs, The N's Queen Bees, Kathy Griffin: My Life on the D-List, Tori Spelling THS and Paris Hilton's My New BFF. In addition to reality television, Hilton has guest starred as himself in scripted shows such as Privileged. Hilton is a regular on series such as TRL, MuchMusic, and Extra where he appears via satellite from his closet studio to talk about gossip. He co-hosted the 2008 MTV Europe Music Awards and after Rick Astley did not show up to collect his award for best act ever at the MTV Europe Music Awards, Perez Hilton collected the prize on Astley's behalf.

On June 21, 2009, Hilton was a presenter at the 2009 MuchMusic Video Awards in Toronto. On December 2, 2009, he was a guest on the TV show The View. In 2010, Hilton guest starred as himself in the episode Victorious "Wi-Fi in the Sky". Hilton created and presented a British television series, Perez Hilton Superfan for ITV2 in December 2011. On the January 16, 2012, edition of WWE Raw, he was a special guest ring announcer for a Divas tag team match, between The Bella Twins and Kelly Kelly and Eve, stopping the twins' switch place and win. In April 2012, he appeared on Oprah's Lifeclass live at New York City's Radio City Music Hall, along with Oprah Winfrey and Deepak Chopra, talking about how after his "spiritual awakening", he changed his past celebrity bashing ways and that he had found a new purpose.

In January 2015, Hilton took part as a housemate on the fifteenth season of the British reality series, Celebrity Big Brother. He became the seventh celebrity to be evicted on February 4, 2015. In August 2017, he was a contestant on Worst Cooks in America Season 11: Celebrity Edition 3. He won the competition and was crowned "Best of the Worst".

In December 2020, Hilton was permanently banned from TikTok, where he had amassed 1.6 million followers. He released a video of himself crying in reaction to the ban, and begging TikTok influencer Charli D'Amelio, who he had criticized, for help in having him reinstated. In December 2021, Hilton was a guest star on Red Table Talk: The Estefans alongside singer-songwriter Gabbie Hanna for a discussion about cancel culture.

=== Live theater ===
Hilton starred as himself in NEWSical The Musical, an off-Broadway musical which had a four-week run, beginning on September 8, 2012. He said, "I am beyond thrilled, nervous and zen about making my New York theater debut. It's gonna be a wild ride in a show that guarantees to put smiles on people's faces. It will be no holds barred pure unadulterated fun. I expect to have the time of my life and look forward to hugging happy theatergoers after each show."

Hilton starred as Danny Tanner/Bob Saget in Full House! The Musical, which ran at Theater 80 in Manhattan from September 10, 2015, through November 29, 2015. The musical was a satire on the sitcom Full House that aired on the American Broadcasting Company from 1987 through 1995.

=== Radio, YouTube, and podcast ===
Hilton premiered his nationally syndicated radio show, Radio Perez, which included updates from his blog, on May 5, 2008. He has also appeared on The Howard Stern Show on Sirius XM Satellite Radio. In July 2015, Hilton and radio personality Chris Booker started a weekly podcast called The Perez Hilton Podcast with Chris Booker. The description is "A meeting of the minds, these two very different personalities chime in and clash over the week's hottest topics." The two held a live taping on April 27, 2019, at The Space in Las Vegas.

== Legal issues and controversies ==
=== Civil litigation ===
A suit against Hilton for copyright infringement was filed by Zomba Label Group on October 11, 2007, stating that Hilton had illegally posted recordings by Britney Spears on PerezHilton.com. The illegal postings include at least 10 completed songs and unfinished recordings leaked over a period of three months. The suit asked for real and punitive damages in an unspecified amount as well as legal costs. Spears was not a party to the suit. In March 2008, Hilton announced on his blog that he would no longer blog about artists signed to Sony BMG (which owned Zomba at the time). However, when the lawsuit was settled in November of that year, Hilton ended his boycott and resumed regular blogging about Sony BMG artists.

On October 11, 2007, a judge cleared the way for Hilton to be deposed in an ongoing defamation suit brought against him by DJ Samantha Ronson, after a post on PerezHilton.com claimed that she had planted cocaine in friend Lindsay Lohan's car and set Lohan up to be photographed while under the influence of alcohol and drugs. Hilton's report was a repetition of gossip initially posted on CelebrityBabylon.com. The judge was informed in court that the owner of that site had already settled the case with Ronson. On January 23, 2008, Perez Hilton was awarded $85,000 by Superior Court Judge Elihu Berle in this lawsuit filed by Ronson.

Hilton has attracted lawsuits due to his use of video footage of celebrities on his blog. He was named as a defendant in a lawsuit filed by attorneys for Irish actor Colin Farrell on July 18, 2005, after posting a link to Farrell's sex tape with then-girlfriend Nicole Narain on his site, and on February 20, 2007, a lawsuit filed against him by Universal City Studios Productions LLP for posting a topless image of actress Jennifer Aniston that was allegedly "misappropriated and illegally copied" from unreleased footage from her 2006 motion picture The Break-Up. Bloggers, journalists, news agencies and photographers alike have charged that Hilton posts paparazzi photographs and other copyrighted content from their sites. On November 30, 2006, the photo agency X17Online filed a lawsuit against Hilton in federal court, seeking over $7.5 million in damages for copyright infringement. X17's co-owner Robin Navarre told the Los Angeles Times that the sale value of their photographs has been significantly reduced because the photos have appeared on PerezHilton.com before they could be published in magazines to which exclusivity is important. Navarre said:

X17 can make as much as tens of thousands of dollars from one magazine on an exclusive story. In the case of the Spears smooch shot, X17 sold a two-page spread to Us Weekly, but the magazine decided to shrink the photo play (which lowered the price by $10,000, to $15,000) ... because the images had already been on Hilton's site and others.

Hilton defends his use of this material by claiming it under the fair use exception to the Copyright Act; that is, according to the Los Angeles Times, the photos are altered "to achieve a satiric or humorous end". On March 9, 2007, a judge ruled that Hilton could continue operating his website while the lawsuit remained before the courts. On April 23, 2007, a consortium of five celebrity photo agencies filed a joint lawsuit in federal district court in California against Hilton, claiming more than $7 million in damages from 25 instances of alleged copyright infringement. Days later, on April 26, 2007, upon arriving in Sydney, to attend the MTV Australia Video Music Awards, Hilton was served with a lawsuit by celebrity photo agency PhotoNews claiming C$4,200 in damages for his alleged unauthorized use of a single copyrighted paparazzi photograph of John Mayer and Jessica Simpson.

In June 2007, Hilton's web hosting service dropped his site upon threats of liability in the cases outlined above. Navarre called this "the first victory, and we put a lot of work into trying to get this to happen." He added, "It's a precedent that's huge. When we were talking to Crucial Paradigm they were saying they were not responsible, dragging their feet. We had to threaten them and show them they were liable. His new host is Blogads, and we are contacting them already." On June 26, 2007, Hilton posted an open call on his blog to all of X17's photographers, both past and present, to contact him if they have not been adequately compensated for working overtime or pictures submitted in the past. Hilton has not used photos by X17 on his website since the suit. In August 2009, X17's lawsuit against Hilton was settled out of court. The terms of the agreement were not disclosed.

=== Outing celebrities ===
On his blog, Hilton is open about his homosexuality and about his desire to out those who he claims are closeted gay celebrities. When former NSYNC member Lance Bass came out as gay on July 26, 2006, Hilton received criticism for having been partially responsible in the outing. "It upsets me that people think what I'm doing is a bad thing," Hilton told Access Hollywood. "I don't think it's a bad thing. If you know something to be a fact, why not report it? Why is that still taboo?" On November 2, 2006, another celebrity often questioned by Hilton for remaining closeted, actor Neil Patrick Harris, revealed that he is gay.

Members of the gay community who have criticized Hilton's outing include editor of The Advocate Corey Scholibo, AfterElton.com editor Michael Jensen, and Damon Romine, spokesperson for GLAAD. Kim Ficera, of AfterEllen.com, wrote:

I have to question the character of a man who attacks others on such deeply personal levels, without provocation and for self-benefit, monetary or otherwise ... If he's emotionally incapable of exhibiting even the tiniest bit of compassion for closeted people, if he can't be sensitive to the fact that coming out is a very personal decision and that the process can be difficult for some—especially celebrities—I feel sorry for him. If his juvenile behavior is his shtick, I think it makes him a much more pathetic figure, and one the gay and lesbian community should not support ... If we support behavior like Hilton's, we applaud shallowness, arrogance, rage and invasion of privacy, and risk becoming what we despise.

Some fellow gossip bloggers have also objected to his approach. Trent Vanegas, who runs Pink Is the New Blog, told Salon.com, "I do not outright call people gay. I do not feel it is my place, or anyone else's place, to make people come out of the closet. Being shockingly hurtful just to get attention is not my style." David Hauslaib of gossip blog Jossip.com said, "The rationale that he's doing this for the good of that gay community is tantamount to saying that there is a gay agenda. Is this a positive for the gay community? I'd say, 'No.'" Author, screenwriter, and former friend Japhy Grant also questioned his motives, writing on Salon.com, "Spreading gossip is just your average pedestrian variety of immorality. Claiming that you're doing it to further civil rights is an outright sham."

When questioned on Midweek Politics about whether reporting on celebrities' sexual orientation incites homophobia by making it news, Hilton indicated that he did not believe so. He said that coming out in Hollywood is not necessarily a bad thing, citing Ellen DeGeneres and Rosie O'Donnell as examples: "I know there is some controversy about outing people, but I also believe the only way we are gonna have change is with visibility ... if I have to drag some people screaming out of the closet, then I will. I think that lots of celebrities have an archaic fear that being gay will hurt their career but look at Rosie. Look at Ellen." Some prominent gay rights advocates disagree. GLAAD spokesperson Damon Romine told Salon.com, "Media speculation about a celebrity's orientation is not something we support. This kind of gossip can lead some people to the decision to come out, as we have seen recently, or it may drive others further into the closet. People are going to become more guarded and secretive and not less, because they do not want to create any opportunities (for anyone to out them)." Bruce Vilanch said, "What purpose does it serve? These (people like Perez) are professional homosexuals. They are gay people for a living. They have to respect the rights of homosexuals who are not professional."

In an article entitled Just How Dangerous is Perez Hilton?, AfterElton.com suggested that Hilton's actions put people's careers at risk, because anti-gay bias is still a prominent part of American culture. He continued, "Both as a gay man and a journalist, I question whether the gay community should approve of Hilton's actions. Being associated with someone who publishes photos of panty-less starlets and scribbles dirty notes ... makes us look infantile and ridiculous." In 2025, Matt Bomer reflected on the beginnings of his acting career and being outed by Perez Hilton during an episode of Jesse Tyler Ferguson's Dinner's On Me podcast.

=== Miss USA 2009 ===
Hilton served as a judge for the Miss USA 2009 pageant in Las Vegas on April 19, 2009.

During the questions and answers portion of the contest, Hilton asked the Miss California USA representative, Carrie Prejean, whether she believed every state should legalize same-sex marriage. She responded that she believes marriage is between a man and a woman due to her upbringing. After the pageant, Perez Hilton made derogatory comments about the contestant and told ABC News, "She lost it because of that question. She was definitely the front-runner before that", leading some to believe that the answer directly had caused her to lose the competition. Prejean stated that Miss California USA officials had pressured her to apologize for her statement and "not talk" about her Christian faith.

After the pageant, Hilton posted a video blog on his website, where he called Prejean a "dumb bitch" and said her answer was the worst in pageant history. Several politicians and commentators, including gay rights activists, condemned both Hilton and Prejean for making bigoted comments. However, some people, including a few gay rights activists, defended Prejean for exercising her right to free speech, saying that expressing one's views, no matter how offensive they may be, does not justify the use of misogynistic slurs against that person.

=== Post-MMVA 2009 incident in Toronto ===
In June 2009, Hilton alleged in a video blog that he was assaulted by The Black Eyed Peas' operation manager, Polo Molina, after the 2009 MuchMusic Video Awards after party, where the group's lead vocalist, will.i.am, was DJing; Hilton reported that he was struck in the eye by Molina. Will.i.am also released a video statement that said he had approached Hilton regarding derogatory comments that the blogger had made concerning bandmate Fergie and the group's latest release The E.N.D.. During the incident, Hilton called will.i.am a "faggot".

Hilton later admitted in an interview with The Advocate that he originally considered using the word "nigger" instead to provoke a reaction from him, and alleged that Molina attacked at this point. Will.i.am claimed the attacking party was a fan; Molina was detained and appeared at the Toronto Courthouse as a result of the incident. Hilton later filed a lawsuit against Molina, seeking an unspecified amount over $25,000 to cover medical costs and compensation for the "humiliation, mental anguish, and emotional and physical distress" that Hilton suffered as a result of the attack.

GLAAD called upon Hilton to apologize for using an anti-gay slur against will.i.am during the incident, saying, "We have reached out to Hilton and asked him to apologize ... and we would ask media outlets to avoid repetition of the slur in their coverage of this story." Hilton initially refused to apologize: "I am saddened GLAAD chose to victimize me further by criticizing me for how I non-violently dealt with a very scary situation that, unfortunately, turned violent." On June 25, 2009, Hilton said, "I am NOT apologizing to GLAAD ... I am apologizing to the gay community, to anyone who was hurt by my choice of words, and to all the people who have ever emailed me to thank me for all that I have done to fight for gay rights over the last few years."

Hilton pledged to donate any money won in the lawsuit against Molina to the Matthew Shepard Foundation. In a statement released on its website, Judy Shepard, chair of the MSF, declined the gift, saying that "because the lawsuit presumably involves the physical attack prompted by Mr. Hilton's admitted use of an anti-gay slur, the Foundation will be unable to accept any funds obtained in such a manner."

Hilton received little sympathy in the media over the incident, a fact he addressed in his video blog. John Mayer made comments ridiculing Hilton and the incident on his Twitter page, resulting in the two exchanging insults. Gawker expressed skepticism over Hilton's public apology, viewing it as an attempt to rebuild his "brand" and a possible attempt to persuade Canadian authorities from filing criminal charges against him for his use of hate speech during the incident.

=== Michael Jackson's death ===
On June 25, 2009, shortly after Michael Jackson had gone into cardiac arrest, Hilton posted an article about Jackson's illness, claiming it was a publicity stunt. Hilton's original post featured sarcastic comments such as "Get your money back, ticket holders!!!!" and "[Jackson] pulled a similar stunt when he was getting ready for his big HBO special in '95 when he 'collapsed' at rehearsal!", in response to Jackson's recently sold-out tour through March 2010. Realizing Michael Jackson's death was not a hoax, Hilton immediately deleted the original news post and replaced it with a shorter message that linked to a story at entertainment news site TMZ, which said the singer had in fact gone into cardiac arrest. Hilton has received backlash for the incident, becoming entangled in a Twitter argument with Pete Wentz about the situation.

=== Miley Cyrus upskirt picture ===
On June 13, 2010, Hilton posted to Twitter a message linking to an upskirt picture of then-17-year-old Miley Cyrus, that appeared to show Cyrus without underwear. Since Cyrus was still legally a minor at the time, questions were raised as to whether or not child pornography charges could be raised. The site that he had linked to had removed the picture in question. Perez responded to the accusations by claiming that the controversy was "fake" and that Cyrus did wear underwear in the photo in question. Hilton did not re-post the photo for proof. Instead, he linked to another image of Cyrus, supposedly taken on the same occasion, to prove that she had been wearing underwear.

=== Anti-bullying campaign ===
In October 2010, Hilton became involved in the It Gets Better Project started by Dan Savage, urging celebrities to support gay teenagers who were being driven to suicide by anti-gay bullying. This prompted Khloé Kardashian to describe Hilton as her "personal bully", saying that it seemed hypocritical to make an anti-bullying message at the request of a man who had repeatedly bullied her.

On October 13, 2010, Hilton addressed his actions over the previous years in a YouTube video titled "I'm Going To Be Doing Things Differently" and apologized for bullying celebrities. Hilton vowed to change the occasionally malicious tone of his website, even if it meant losing readers and revenue. Hilton announced the launch of three new websites: CoCoPerez.com, which focuses on fashion, FitPerez.com, which encourages physical fitness, and TeddyHilton.com, an animal rights site.

Hilton said that his son, Mario Armando Lavandeira III, will likely be bullied as well. Hilton said, "He will probably be bullied out and about because people might say things to me in front of him when we are in public ... That is even one of the reasons why, even though his name is Mario, I call him Perez Jr. I want him to have an alter ego as well so when people do say things that are hurtful about his dad or hurtful about him hopefully it will not hurt as much because they do not really know him. Those people know you as Perez Jr. but you are not Perez Jr. so it does not matter what they say."

=== Lady Gaga ===
In 2013, singer Lady Gaga claimed that after she cancelled her Born This Way Ball Tour in February 2013 because of a hip injury, Hilton responded by sending her a photo of a wheelchair with the word Karma written across it, and another of Madonna pointing a gun.

On August 18, 2013, a Twitter user reported to Gaga that Hilton had been spotted in the singer's New York City apartment building. Gaga asked the Twitter user to enter the building and collect photographic evidence, before saying that Hilton was stalking her. Later that day, Hilton published a statement on his website in which he denied stalking Lady Gaga. He said that he was looking for a place to live in New York after the birth of his son, and that he was shown the apartment without knowing Lady Gaga lived in the building.

== Personal life ==
Hilton moved to Manhattan, New York, in 2013, saying, "I love New York and that is where me and my growing family want to call home right now". He relocated to Las Vegas before returning to his native Miami. He has three children born via surrogacy. His son was born on February 17, 2013, while his two daughters were born on May 9, 2015 and October 4, 2017.

In April 2018, Perez attracted criticism for saying he hoped his son would be heterosexual because "it would be easier" than being homosexual. He claimed he would not sign up his son for dance classes, if requested, because "dance class might make [his] kid gay".

=== Livestreamed self-harming incident ===
On the evening of August 4, 2026, Hilton livestreamed himself on TikTok from his home in Miami, apparently self-harming and making suicidal threats; the livestream was reportedly up for 30 minutes before being removed. Dozens of supposed cuts on his face and body were shown. Police said they responded to his home and chose to "tactically disengage" and monitor the situation. Hilton was reported to be alone inside the house, though family members were on site. He was later transported to a hospital to receive medical attention. Invoking Florida's Baker Act, medical personnel placed him on an involuntary hold for up to 72 hours. Hilton survived the incident, though his TikTok account was suspended. Hilton's team and family then subsequently released a statement asking for privacy.

== Books ==
On October 6, 2009, Celebra Books released Hilton's first book, Red Carpet Suicide: A Survival Guide on Keeping Up with the Hiltons. Tracey Lomrantz Lester of Glamour stated, "The book gives readers the inside track to becoming 'A Hilton'... AKA 'people we confuse with celebrities': Pimp out your famous kids, give a fierce mug shot, use your fabulousness for good... all great pieces of advice, but let's be honest, I wanted to know more about the FASHION!" On December 1, 2009, Celebra Books released Hilton's second book, Perez Hilton's True Bloggywood Stories: The Glamorous Life of Beating, Cheating, and Overdosing, which the NY Daily News characterized as a "tell-all book".

On September 1, 2011, Celebra Young Readers published Hilton's first children's book entitled The Boy with Pink Hair. Hilton described the book as a story "about every kid that's ever had a dream, felt excluded, wanted to belong, and hoped that one day they could do what they loved and make a difference." In a September 2011 interview with The Advocate, Hilton admitted that the book was inspired by his own childhood: "I've always considered myself a freak, an outsider, and a bit of an interloper. I never really fit in with any groups, so I just did my own thing." On October 6, 2020, Chicago Review Press published Hilton's memoir titled TMI: My Life in Scandal. In the book, Hilton unveils "the story of how Mario Lavandeira became Perez Hilton, the world's first and biggest celebrity blogger, while also becoming the most hated man in Hollywood." Publishers Weekly called it "catnip for Hollywood gossip hounds".

== Discography ==
Hilton released a song called "The Clap" (2008) about gonorrhea, composed and produced by Lucian Piane. The song's music video is from a movie, Another Gay Sequel: Gays Gone Wild! (2008).

=== Singles ===
Title	Year	Album
"The Clap"	2008	Non-album single

=== Other appearances ===
Title	Year	Album
"My Penis" (Larry Tee featuring Perez Hilton)	2009	Club Badd
"Rocket to Uranus" (Vengaboys and Perez Hilton)	2010	The Best of Vengaboys
"Green" (Todrick Hall featuring Perez Hilton)	2016	Straight Outta Oz

- Hilton appears in Rihanna's video "S&M" (2011) "on a leash as Rihanna's pet"
- Hilton appears in MattyB's cover of PSY's "Gangnam Style"

== Filmography ==
=== Film ===
Year	Title	Role	Notes
2008	Another Gay Sequel: Gays Gone Wild!	Himself	Shot in Fort Lauderdale, Florida
2011	Going Down in LA-LA Land	Ricky	
2015	Most Likely to Die	Freddie	
2016	Todrick Hall: Straight Outta Oz	Himself	Visual album; featured artist on "Green"
2016	Meet the Blacks	Denis Strahan	

=== Television ===
Year	Title	Role	Notes
2001	The Sopranos	Male student	Credited as Mario Lavandeira (Episode 3.3)
2004	From Flab to Fab	Himself (as Mario)	VH1's reality weight-loss show
2006	Pepper Dennis	Gay club goer	Credited as Perez Hilton (Episode 1.9)
2007–present	MuchOnDemand	Himself	Occasional guest via webcam to discuss daily gossip
2007	Celebrity Rap Superstar	Himself	Eliminated week six by judges' vote
2007–2008	What Perez Sez	Himself	A series of specials airing on VH1
2007	MADtv	Himself	Guest appearance
2007	Kathy Griffin: My Life on the D-List	Himself	Episode: "Kathy Goes to London"
2007	The 100 Most Annoying People of 2007	Himself	BBC
2007–2008	TRL	Himself	Appears every week to talk about gossip via webcam from his closet studio
2008	Queen Bees	Himself	Interviewed the queen bees
2008	Paris Hilton's My New BFF: Casting Special	Himself	MTV reality series
2008	Fido Awards	Himself	Opened for the Most Outrageous Poop nominees
2008	Extra	Himself	Appears every week to talk about gossip via webcam from his closet studio
2008	The Martha Stewart Show	Himself	Guest appearance to discuss blogging
2008	Privileged	Himself	
2008	Family Guy	Himself	Episode: "I Dream of Jesus"
2009	MTV's My Super Sweet 16 UK SEASON 2	Himself	"Freddy's Sweet 15"
2009	Bad Girls Club (season 3)	Himself	Reunion host
2009	Degrassi: The Next Generation	Himself	Guest appearance (Episode 818 to episode 822, titled Paradise City)
2009	Miss USA 2009	Himself	TV special
2010	Bad Girls Club (season 4)	Himself	Reunion host
2010	When I Was 17	Himself	
2010	Anna & Kristina's Beauty Call	Himself	Guest judge for Episode 26: "Debbie: Stylish Traveler"
2010	America's Next Top Model	Himself	Guest appearance in episode 1402
2010	Bad Girls Club: Miami	Himself	Reunion host
2010	Tosh.0	Himself	Guest appearance in episode 38
2010	Victorious	Himself	Guest appearance on the episode Wi-Fi in the Sky
2011	Bad Girls Club: Back in L.A.	Himself	Reunion host
2011	Perez Hilton Superfan	Himself	Presenter. ITV2 entertainment series in the UK
2011	Bad Girls Club: New Orleans	Himself	Reunion host
2012	Glee	Himself	Guest appearance on the episode Nationals
2014	Hot in Cleveland	Spa receptionist	"Mystery Date: Oscar Edition"
2015	Celebrity Big Brother	Himself	Celebrity housemate
2015	Miss Universe 2015	Himself	TV special
2017	Worst Cooks in America	Himself	Season 11: Celebrity Edition 3 – contestant and winner
2018	Life-Size 2: A Christmas Eve	Himself	TV film

=== Music videos ===
Year	Title	Artist	Role
2007	"When I'm Gone"	Simple Plan	Himself
2009	"Hush Hush; Hush Hush"	The Pussycat Dolls	Himself
2011	"Bad Behaviour"	Jedward	Himself
2011	"S&M"	Rihanna	Man gagged
2011	"Libertad"	Christian Chávez & Anahí	Man costumed as rabbit
2014	"Really Don't Care"	Demi Lovato feat. Cher Lloyd	Himself

== See also ==
- List of LGBTQ people in New York City
- New Yorkers in journalism
