= Peter Aderhold =

German composer and conductor

Peter Aderhold (born 1966) is a German composer, conductor, and music educator known for his work in opera, orchestral music, and contemporary classical composition.

== Life and career ==
Born in Berlin, Aderhold studied conducting (with Horst Förster, Olaf Koch, Heinz Rögner) and composition (Günter Kochan) at the Hochschule für Musik Hanns Eisler Berlin from 1982 to 1988. In 1988, he passed his Staatsexamen in composition with the ballet music Diana; this he premiered as conductor on the occasion of the GDR Music Days in Berlin in 1990 with the Berlin Symphony Orchestra; it was broadcast several times on radio and television. From 1988 to 1993, he was conductor at the Volkstheater Rostock, then in 1994/95, he moved to the Theater Krefeld und Mönchengladbach as conductor. Since 1991, he has been chief conductor of the Mecklenburg-Vorpommern State Youth Orchestra (among others first prize in the 1997 "Youth and Music in Vienna" competition).

From 1995 to July 2000, he was first Kapellmeister and deputy general music director at the Stadttheater Bremerhaven. Since August 2000, he has been living in Berlin as a freelance composer and conductor. He has been responsible for the musical direction of several productions (among others In the Penal Colony by Philip Glass and Bremer Freiheit by Adriana Hölszky) at the Berliner Kammeroper. He has also worked as a guest conductor with the Staatskapelle Berlin, Dresden Philharmonic, Mecklenburgische Staatskapelle, Schwerin Philharmonic and the Hall Philharmonic. Since 2003 he has led the Akademisches Orchester Berlin.

Aderhold wrote symphonic works as well as the chamber opera Odysseus and the Stranger for the Opernhaus Zürich (2001) and the opera Luther on the occasion of the reopening of the Theater Erfurt. He performed his composition Fanfare for Orchestra with the Akademisches Orchester Berlin in 2008 on the occasion of its 100th anniversary. In 2011, he wrote Meditation - Concerto for Alphorn and Orchestra for the same orchestra. His Concerto for one Player with two Saxophones and Orchestra, written for Branford Marsalis, was premiered on 12 February 2012 in Frankfurt by the latter and the Theater Krefeld und Mönchengladbach conducted by Sebastian Weigle.

Aderhold was a visiting professor at the Konrad Wolf Film University of Babelsberg from 2011 to 2012. (compositional technique, instrumentation and conducting in the film music course) and is a lecturer at the Hanns Eisler Academy of Music in Berlin (instrumentation, composition, ear training).

On 22 April 2016, his second opera Orlando based on the eponymous novel by Virginia Woolf was premiered at the Staatstheater Braunschweig and won the Opera Prize Braunschweig in 2014.

== Prizes and awards ==
For his ballet music Diana, he received the Prize of Criticism of the Music Criticism Commission of the Association of Composers and Musicologists of the GDR at the 1990 GDR Music Days.
