= Francis Levy =

American novelist

- Born: March 12, 1948 (age 78); New York City, U.S.
- Occupation: Writer
- Spouse: Hallie Cohen (1982–present)
- Writing career
- Period: 1993–present
- Notable work: Erotomania: A Romance (2008)
- Literary movement: Postmodern literature
- Website: www.mwww.screamingpope.com

Francis Levy (born March 28, 1948) is the author of the comic novels Erotomania: A Romance, published by Two Dollar Radio in 2008 and subsequently translated in a Spanish edition in 2009, and Seven Days in Rio, published by Two Dollar Radio in 2011. Levy is also the co-founder of the Philoctetes Center for the Multidisciplinary Study of Imagination. He has been profiled in The East Hampton Star, AIGA Voice, Nerve.com, and elsewhere.

== Education ==
Levy received a BA from Columbia University in 1969 and an M.F.A from the Yale School of Drama in 1973.

== Writing ==
Levy's debut novel, Erotomania: A Romance, a satirical examination of compulsive sexuality, was a Queerty Top 10 Book of 2008 and named a Standout Book of the Year by Inland Empire Weekly. Erotomania was reviewed in The Village Voice, Los Angeles Times, Publishers Weekly, Time Out Chicago and elsewhere.

Levy's short stories, poems, criticism, and essays have appeared in The New York Times, The Washington Post, The New Republic, The Village Voice, The East Hampton Star, The Quarterly, and Evergreen Review. The journal American Imago published a long autobiographical essay about Levy's psychoanalytic treatment entitled "Psychoanalysis: The Patient’s Cure” in its Spring 2010 issue. Levy blogs as The Screaming Pope.

== The Philoctetes Center ==
Inspired by CP Snow's famed "Two Cultures" essay, The Philoctetes Center (2003–2011) brought together scientists, artists, and scholars in an attempt to bridge the separation between the worlds of science and the humanities. In doing so, the Center hosted a range of figures from the humanities, including Edward Albee, John Turturro, Nicholson Baker, John Cameron Mitchell, Rick Moody, Ned Rorem, Rocco Landesman, C. K. Williams, Sharon Olds, Kiki Smith, Bruce McCall, Lewis Black, Philip Pearlstein, and Chuck Close, together with such distinguished scientists as physicist Brian Greene, Nobel prize-winning researchers Gerald Edelman and Christian de Duve, and neuroscientists Antonio Damasio and Joseph E. LeDoux, among others.

== Life ==
He also holds a third-degree black belt from Seido Karate, and was the subject of a profile concerning his workout regimen in the online edition of The Wall Street Journal.
