= Nog (novel) =

1968 novel by Rudolph Wurlitzer

- First edition
- Author: Rudolph Wurlitzer
- Language: English
- Genre: Psychedelic
- Publisher: Random House
- Publication date: 1968
- Publication place: United States
- Media type: Print
- Pages: 167

Nog is a psychedelic novel by Rudolph Wurlitzer published in 1968. Monte Hellman's enjoyment of the novel prompted him to hire Wurlitzer to rewrite the screenplay for Two-Lane Blacktop (1971). Nog was reprinted in 2009 by the independent publisher Two Dollar Radio.

== Plot overview ==
The novel, which is deliberately disjointed and at times self-contradictory, is the first-person account of an unnamed unreliable narrator. He occasionally gives his name as Nog, but he also implies that Nog is a different person. At the start of the novel, he is living in a shack on a beach, meditating and rehearsing his memories. He is in possession of a fake octopus housed in the back of a truck, which he may have purchased from a man named Nog. His meditation is disrupted when he sees a woman picking shells. He follows her back to her house, where she and her husband are throwing a party. On the way, the narrator also encounters a silly old man, Colonel Green, who is obsessed with maintaining a seawall outside his beach home. After the party, the action shifts to a city, where the narrator is shopping at a supermarket. He follows another woman, Meridith, to a commune run by a man named Lockett, who is alternately presented as an oracle, a drug dealer, a con-man, and a visionary. The narrator lives in a hallway outside a bathroom for a while, lying on a mattress, then moves to the pantry, where he hands out food to people when they approach. Just when he has settled into this way of life, Lockett and Meridith abduct him, and take him with them on a journey. They raid a hospital for drugs; in the process they encounter a senile old man named The General. Lockett then leads the narrator and Meridith into the woods, where he has stored supplies. They float down a river on a raft, then make camp on a ledge. The narrator stays behind while Lockett and Meridith head down into a small mining town. He builds a wall with a bunch of tin cans, and has sex with a woman who wanders by. He then nearly gets shot by a hunter who calls himself Bench. The two men share drugs. Bench then leads the narrator in a raid on the town, which he claims he owns, and which has been taken over by a group of young people. Lockett, now calling himself Nog, has established himself there as a guru. Bench shoots and kills Lockett and seems to get shot himself. The narrator, now calling himself Lockett, leaves the town with Meridith. They enter a desert, where they meet yet another old man, a hermit named The Captain, who mistakes Nog for Lockett and claims to have known his father. He supplies the couple with tickets to a ship, which they board. There they encounter another old man named The Captain, who also mistakes Nog for Lockett. The novel concludes at sea with the narrator boarding a lifeboat and becoming separated from Meridith. He tells us he "flew to New York."

== Reception ==
An article in Atlantic Monthly described the novel as effectively replicating "the slight and continuous dissociation of reality...normally achieved by using soft drugs to tinker with the nervous system." Thomas Pynchon wrote of the book: "Wow, this is some book, I mean it's more than a beautiful and heavy trip, it's also very important in an evolutionary way, showing us directions we could be moving in — hopefully another sign that the Novel of Bullshit is dead and some kind of re-enlightenment is beginning to arrive, to take hold. Rudolph Wurlitzer is really, really good, and I hope he manages to come down again soon, long enough anyhow to guide us on another one like Nog."
