= Silvia Weiss =

German operatic and concert soprano

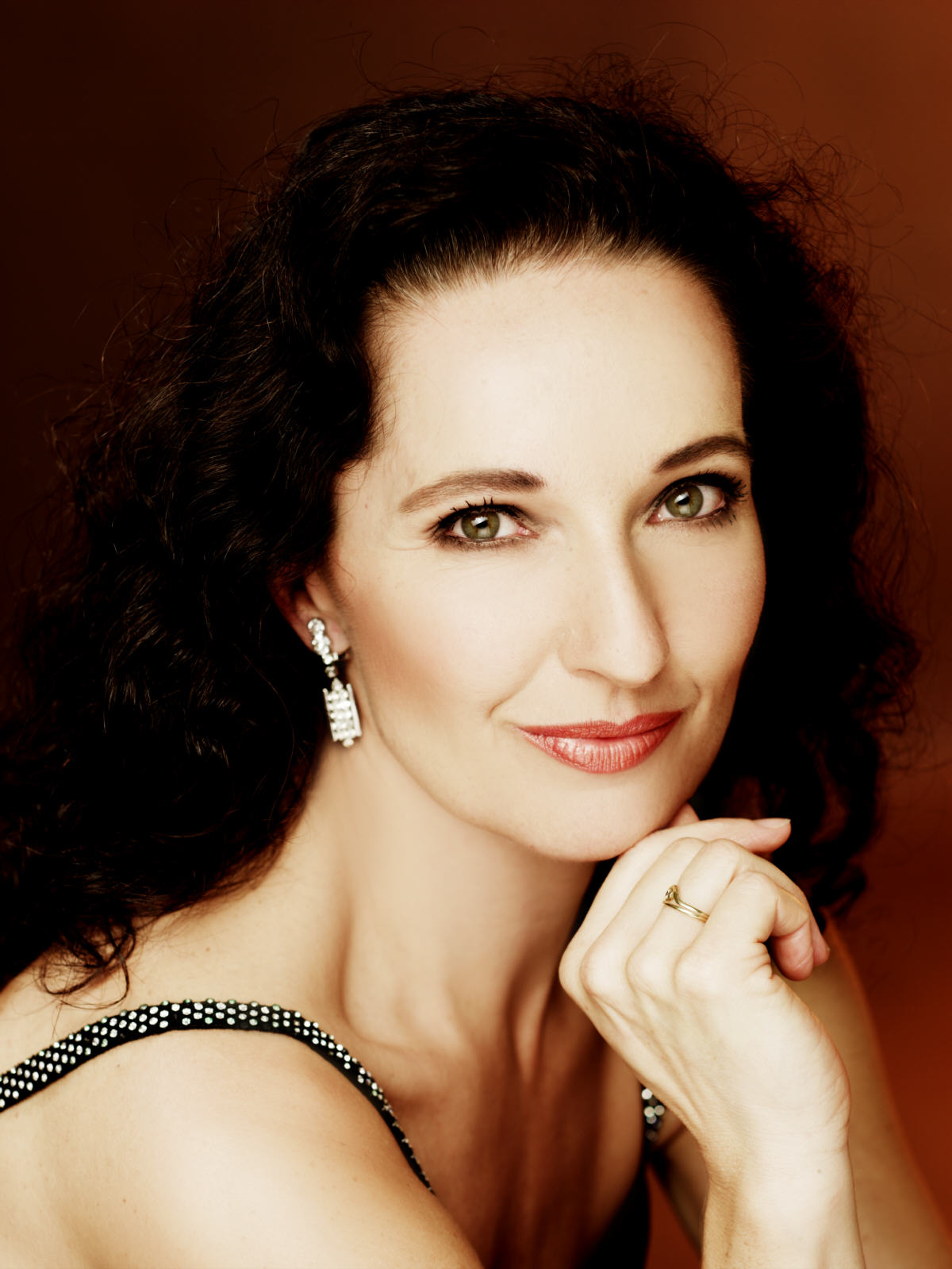
Silvia Weiss

Silvia Weiss is a German operatic and concert soprano who performed at major international festivals, first mainly in concerts but from 1997 increasingly on opera stages, in roles such as Mozart's Elvira in Don Giovanni and Konstanze in The Abduction from the Seraglio. She recorded operas by Hans Werner Henze, Ernst Krenek and Ernst Toch.

== Life ==
Weiss was born in Wiesbaden where her musical talent was already noticed during her school days. Very soon she sang in the children and youth choir of the Hessisches Staatstheater Wiesbaden, had her first performances there and in Kurhaus concerts. She studied voice at the Berlin University of the Arts with Donald Grobe. There, she was also in Aribert Reimann's Lied class, which had a decisive influence on contemporary music. While still a student, she made her debut at the Berliner Kammeroper as Elisabeth Zimmer in Hans Werner Henze's Elegie für junge Liebende and in Baroque operas by Reinhard Keiser and Francesco Cavalli. She appeared in a production at the Schaubühne am Halleschen Ufer Sophie Scholl in Udo Zimmermann's Weiße Rose. She was a finalist and scholarship holder of the VDMK Federal Singing Competition. She took master classes with Irmgard Hartmann-Dressler, and Ileana Cotrubaș, Josef Metternich, Klesie Kelly and Reri Grist.

After her studies, she initially focused on concert singing, appearing in Europe, Russia and the US. In a broad repertoire, she worked with concert choirs and orchestras including the Internationale Bachakademie Stuttgart with Helmuth Rilling, the Thomanerchor and Gewandhausorchester, the Deutsches Symphonie-Orchester and the Dresdner Philharmonie under Marek Janowski, the Munich Radio Orchestra under Jun Märkl, the Rundfunk-Sinfonieorchester Berlin under Jahja Ling, the Berlin and Munich Radio Choirs. Important concerts were Haydn's Die Jahreszeiten with the Konzerthaus Orchestra conducted by Michael Gielen and Die Auferstehung und Himmelfahrt Jesu with the Mozarteum Orchestra Salzburg conducted by Ivor Bolton. She performed regularly with the Dresdner Kreuzchor conducted by Roderich Kreile, such as Bach's Christmas Oratorio and Fauré's Requiem. Weiss performed with Baroque ensembles such as the Concerto Köln and the Akademie für Alte Musik Berlin, and with contemporary ensembles such as the Sharoun Ensemble, the Ensemble Neue Musik Berlin, the Ensemble Avantgarde Leipzig, and Musica Viva Dresden.

Weiss performed as Ännchen in Weber's Der Freischütz in a concert performance of the Berliner Festwochen conducted by Nikolaus Harnoncourt. In 1997 she began her opera career on stage as Donna Elvira in Mozart's Don Giovanni in the first opera production by Katharina Thalbach at the E-Werk in Berlin. Shortly afterwards she performed the title role of Donizetti's Lucia di Lammermoor in Honduras. In 1999 she appeared at the Deutsche Oper Berlin in Götz Friedrich's production of Schoenberg's Moses und Aron, conducted by Christian Thielemann. She performed as a guest at the Wuppertaler Bühnen, Mecklenburg State Theatre and La Monnaie in Brussels, among others. Engagements at the Brandenburg Theatre followed (Romilda in Handel's Serse under the direction of Michael Helmrath) and at the Vienna Schauspielhaus (Tisbe in Johann Adolf Hasse's Piramo e Tisbe with the Vienna Academy under Simon Schouten) and in 2002 at the Théatre de la Monnaie in Brussels in the world premiere of Luca Francesconi's Ballata (musical direction was by Kasushi Ono, directed by Achim Freyer). A central role was Konstanze from Mozart's The Abduction from the Seraglio, which she sang in many productions, for example in the new production at the Wuppertaler Bühnen under Enrico Delamboye, directed by Johannes Weigand, at the Staatstheater Wiesbaden, and at the Mainfranken Theater Würzburg in 2004 Würzburg. Other important lead roles were Verdi Gilda in Rigoletto and Violetta in La traviata. She appeared as Cyane in Proserpin by Joseph Martin Kraus, conducted by Christoph Spering and directed by Georges Delnon at the 2006 Schwetzinen Festival. She performed as the Voice of the Falcon in Die Frau ohne Schatten by R. Strauss at the Théâtre du Capitole the same year, conducted by Pinchas Steinberg and directed by Nicolas Joel. It led to a re-invitation for a recital at the Midi du Capitole, and to appear as Käthe in the world premiere of Faust by Philippe Fénelon, conducted by Bernhard Kontarsky and directed by Pet Halmen. At the end of 2007, she made her debut at the Teatro San Carlo in Naples as the First Squire and Flower Girl in Wagner's Parsifal, conducted by Asher Fisch and directed by Federico Tiezzi. She performed as Pamina in Mozart's Die Zauberflöte at the Dresdner Staatsoperette in 2008.

== Festivals ==
Weiss appeared at festivals including the Salzburg Easter Festival, the Dresdner Musikfestspiele, the Styriarte, and the Ludwigsburger Schlossfestspiele.

== Recordings ==
- Hans Werner Henze: Elegie für junge Liebende, 1995 Deutsche Schallplatten Berlin
- Ernst Krenek: Das geheime Königreich, 2004 Capriccio
- Ernst Toch: Die Prinzessin auf der Erbse (title role), 2007 Capriccio
