= In the Penal Colony (opera) =

2000 opera by Philip Glass

- Chamber opera by Philip Glass
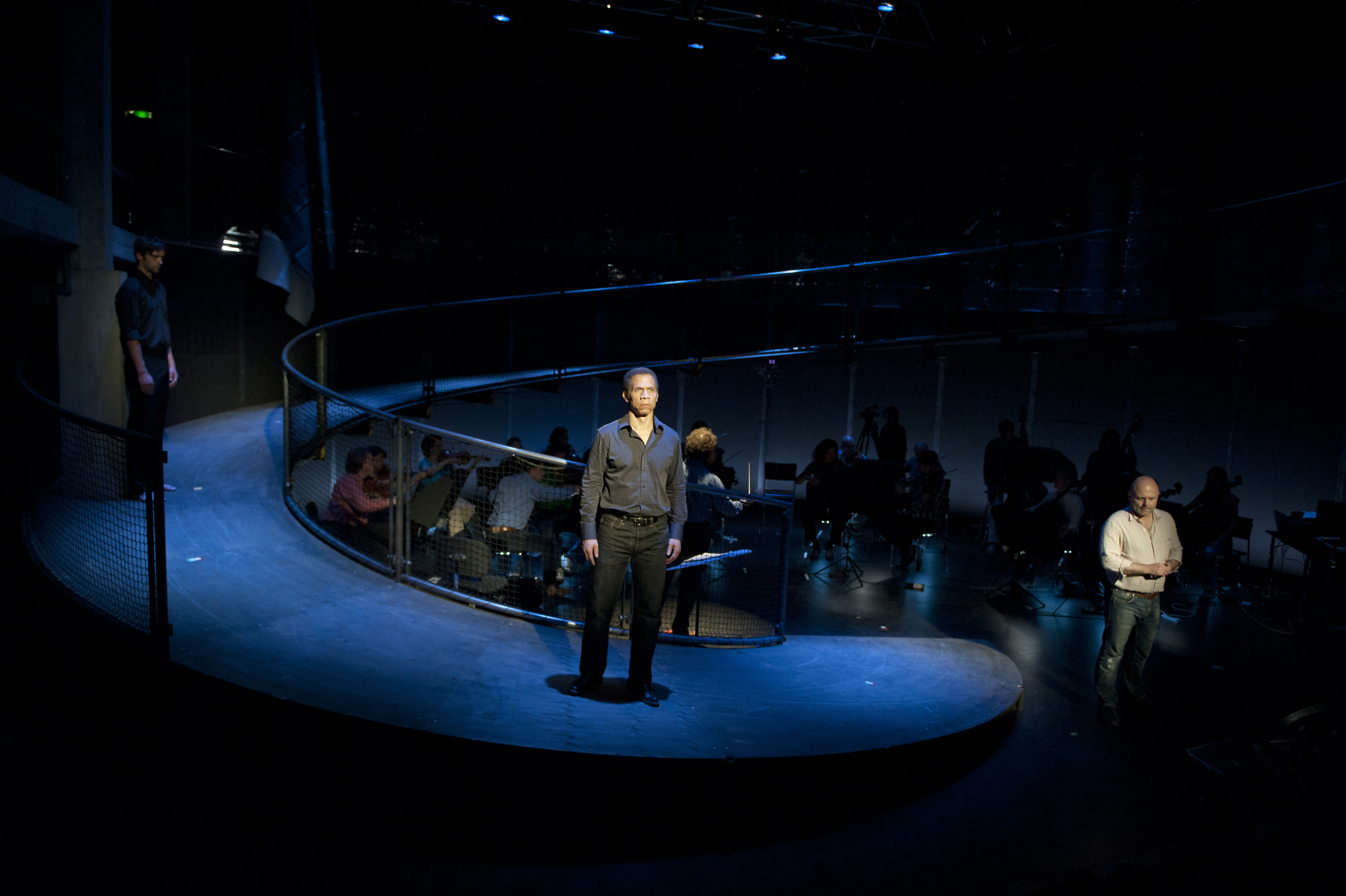
- Rehearsal for the Swiss premiere in Zurich, May 2011
- Librettist: Rudy Wurlitzer
- Based on: "In the Penal Colony" by Franz Kafka
- Premiere: August 31, 2000; ACT Theatre, Seattle

In the Penal Colony is a chamber opera in one act and 16 scenes composed by Philip Glass to an English-language libretto by Rudy Wurlitzer. The opera is based on Franz Kafka's German-language short story In the Penal Colony. It was commissioned by ACT Theatre in Seattle, Washington, where it premiered on August 31, 2000. It has a running time of approximately 80 minutes and is scored for two singers (tenor and bass-baritone) and a string quintet.

== Background ==
Kafka's harrowing story "In the Penal Colony" ("In der Strafkolonie") was adapted as a play by Steven Berkoff in 1969. Glass chose to use it as the basis for an opera and selected the creative team. He and his long-time collaborator and former wife JoAnne Akalaitis worked on the idea on and off for three years before receiving a commission from ACT Theatre in Seattle. Akalaitis worked closely with the librettist, Rudy Wurlitzer, in adapting the story for the musical stage and directed the premiere production. Glass referred to the work as a "pocket opera" and deliberately chose the small-scale format of a chamber opera to increase the likelihood that it would be frequently performed.

In Kafka's story, only two of the four characters speak, The Officer and The Visitor, whose roles in the opera are assigned to a bass-baritone and tenor respectively. As in the story, The Prisoner and The Guard remain silent. Akalaitis added a fifth character for the premiere production, Kafka himself, who serves as a narrator and onlooker. The texts for the narration were chosen by Akalaitis from Kafka's diaries. The opera's music is played by a string quintet. In the original production, they appear as musicians from the penal colony where the story takes place and are costumed variously as soldiers and civilians.

== Performance history ==
The world premiere performance of the opera on August 31, 2000 at ACT Theatre was a co-production with the Court Theatre in Chicago who staged it later that year. John Duykers, who had created the role of Mao Tse-tung in Adams's Nixon in China, was The Visitor, and Herbert Perry, who had created the role of Vasco da Gama in Glass's White Raven, was The Officer. Perry's identical twin brother, Eugene, alternated with him in the role. Three actors played non-singing roles: Jose Gonzales as Kafka, Steven M. Levine as the soldier and Matt Seidman as the condemned man. Alan O. Johnson conducted the Metropolitan String Ensemble. The sets were designed by John Conklin, with costumes by Susan Hilferty and lighting by Jennifer Tipton.

In the Penal Colony ran at the ACT Theatre until October 1. The production, directed by JoAnne Akalaitis with the same singers, opened in Chicago at the Court Theatre in December 2000. Its New York City premiere followed in June 2001 when it was performed by the Classic Stage Company. The German premiere was produced in November 2002 by the Berliner Kammeroper, directed by Kay Kuntze, conducted by Peter Aderhold. The work premiered in France at the Opéra National de Lyon on January 23, 2009. The UK premiere took place at the Linbury Studio Theatre in London's Royal Opera House on September 15, 2010. On that occasion, it was performed in a production by Music Theatre Wales who then took it on tour to several British cites. It was given three performances in May 2011 at the Theater der Künste in Zürich as part of the Philip Glass Festival and had its Australian premiere at the National Institute of Dramatic Art's Parade Playhouse in Sydney on April 7, 2012. Chicago Fringe Opera gave the opera a Chicago revival with six performances in May 2016.

After the original Akalaitis production performed in Seattle, Chicago and New York City, subsequent ones have varied the number of non-speaking roles and the placement of the string ensemble. The Opéra National de Lyon production directed by Richard Brunel added a second non-speaking guard. The Music Theatre Wales production directed by Michael McCarthy eliminated the guard's role completely. The Australian production directed by Imara Savage placed the string players off-stage and set the action in a hospital-like corridor. None of these later productions used the Kafka narrator.

== Roles ==
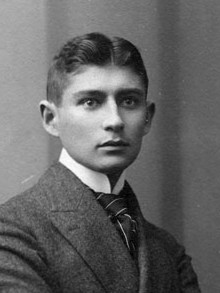
Franz Kafka in 1906

Roles, voice types, premiere cast
Role	Voice type	Premiere cast, August 31, 2000 Conductor: Alan O. Johnson
The Officer	bass-baritone	Herbert Perry
The Visitor	tenor	John Duykers
The Guard	silent role	Steven M. Levine
The Prisoner	silent role	Matt Seidman
Franz Kafka	speaking role	Jose Gonzales

== Synopsis ==
Setting: The remote island penal colony of a powerful but unnamed country in 1907

A high-ranking visitor arrives in the penal colony. He was invited there to witness the public execution of a prisoner using a strange machine invented by the former commandant of the colony. The machine slowly carves a description of the condemned man's crimes into his flesh and after hours of excruciating torture kills him. The device is operated by the officer in charge of the prison who is utterly devoted to the machine and to the memory of the deceased commandant who invented it. He is disturbed by the machine's state of disrepair and the growing criticism of its use, including criticism from the island's current commandant. He hopes that the visitor will be impressed by the machine and will speak in favor of its "redemptive powers" to the commandant. The visitor is appalled by the machine but sings "It's always risky interfering in other peoples' business [...] I oppose this procedure, but I will not intervene." When the officer realizes that the visitor will not actively support him, he frees the condemned prisoner from the machine and climbs onto it himself, seeking the redemption of a slow and painful death. The machine, however, malfunctions and instead of killing him slowly, kills him almost instantly by piercing his skull. It then self-destructs. The visitor boards a boat and leaves the island.

== Recording ==
- Glass: In the Penal Colony – Michael Bennett (The Visitor), Omar Ebrahim (The Officer); Music Theatre Wales; Michael Rafferty (conductor). Recorded October 27–28, 2010. Label: Orange Mountain OMM0078
