= Barbara Browning =

American academic, novelist, dancer, and cultural critic

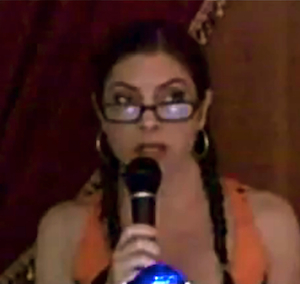
- Born: December 7, 1961; Madison, Wisconsin, US
- Occupations: Professor, Cultural Critic, Novelist, Performer
- Children: Leo Oliveira
- Writing career
- Genres: Nonfiction (cultural analysis), Novels, Poetry, Chamber Choreography
- Notable works: The Gift (or, Techniques of the Body) (2017); I'm Trying to Reach You (2012); The Correspondence Artist (2011); Who Is Mr. Waxman? (audiobook, 2007); Infectious Rhythm: Metaphors of Contagion and the Spread of African Culture (1998); Samba: Resistance in Motion (1995)
- Notable awards: Lambda Literary Award: Bisexual fiction (2018, 2012); De La Torre Bueno Prize for outstanding book on dance (Samba: Resistance in Motion); Runner-up, Yale Younger Poets Prize (1989); President's Distinguished Teaching Award, Princeton University
- Website: admin.tisch.nyu.edu/object/BrowningB.html

Barbara Browning (born December 7, 1961, in Madison, Wisconsin) is an American academic, novelist, dancer, and cultural critic.

== Education and career ==
Browning received her B.A. in comparative literature from Yale University in 1983, spent a year in Brazil on a Fulbright fellowship, where she studied dance, and then returned to Yale to complete her Ph.D. in 1989. She taught for six years in the English Department of Princeton University, where she was awarded the President's Distinguished Teaching Award, and since then has taught in the Department of Performance Studies at the Tisch School of the Arts, New York University, serving for a time as chair.

== Writing ==
Her first book, Samba: Resistance in Motion (1995), was an ethnographic account of her experiences studying and performing Brazilian dance. It was the 1996 recipient of the de la Torre Bueno Prize for an outstanding publication in the field of dance scholarship. Her second academic book was Infectious Rhythm: Metaphors of Contagion and the Spread of African Culture (1998). Browning began writing fiction in 2004, producing an audionovel in 2007 (Who Is Mr. Waxman?). Her novel The Correspondence Artist was published in 2011 by Two Dollar Radio. Her second novel, I'm Trying to Reach You, was published by Two Dollar Radio in June 2012. It is a multimedia project linked to a series of "chamber choreographies" which she has published on YouTube. Her third novel, The Gift, is similarly accompanied by a series of dance videos posted online, ostensibly by the narrator. It was published by the Emily Books imprint of Coffee House Press.

Readers of Browning's academic writing have noted that in addition to representing "a pioneering effort in bringing discussions about the popular culture of Brazil into the North American academy," it evidences "the imagination of a novelist." By the same token, her novels take up such apparently academic concerns as the work of anthropologists Claude Lévi-Strauss and Mary Douglas, the psychoanalytic theories of Jacques Lacan, and the correspondence of Simone de Beauvoir and Nelson Algren, as well as incorporating photography and referencing video art, leading one reviewer to characterize her work as "part memoir, part fiction, part epistolary, part metadata-existentialist philosophy, part art installation."

== Works ==
Cultural Criticism:

- Samba: Resistance in Motion (1995). ISBN 978-0253328670.
- Infectious Rhythm: Metaphors of Contagion and the Spread of African Culture (1998). ISBN 978-0415919807.
- Caetano Veloso: A Foreign Sound (2017). ISBN 978-1501319235.
- The Miniaturists (2022). ISBN 978-1478018919.

Audio novel:

- Who Is Mr. Waxman? (2007)

Novels:

- The Correspondence Artist (2011). ISBN 978-0982015193.
- I'm Trying to Reach You (2012). ISBN 978-0983247111.
- The Gift (or, Techniques of the Body) (2017). ISBN 978-1566894685.
