= Perez Hilton Superfan =

2011 British television series

- Title card
- Genre: Factual Entertainment
- Created by: Perez Hilton; Steven Grossman
- Presented by: Perez Hilton
- Theme music composer: Vanacore Music, LLC
- Country of origin: United Kingdom
- Original language: English
- No. of series: 1
- No. of episodes: 4

Production
- Executive producers: Chris Coelen; Jennifer Danska; Steven Grossman; Perez Hilton; Matilda Zoltowski; Billy Taylor
- Producer: Stefanie Cohen Williams
- Cinematography: Damien King; John Agnew; Martin Mate; Martin Newstead; Jeff Devuono; John Ealer; Ben Chaves; Stan Fisher
- Editors: Noah Rosenstein; Paulo Demello; Marcelo Lopes; Robert Krauss; Nick Arico; Karen Segal
- Camera setup: Multi-camera
- Running time: 45 minutes (approx.)
- Production companies: STV Studios; Kinetic Content; GroupM Entertainment

Original release
- Network: ITV2
- Release: 7 December – 28 December 2011

Perez Hilton Superfan is a television series released in the United Kingdom in 2011. The programme, broadcast on ITV2, features the American celebrity blogger Perez Hilton gaining an intimate insight into the lives of four international singers/performers - Lady Gaga, Katy Perry, Kelly Rowland and Enrique Iglesias.

== Episodes ==
=== Lady Gaga ===
- Original air date: 7 December 2011
- Unofficial rating: 310,200 (1.76%)

Perez is joined by global phenomenon and close friend Lady Gaga as they spend time together in two different continents. Beginning their journey in Hollywood the pair also jet off to Sydney, Australia.

The show features private and exclusive interviews, antics and moments, from the close friends cooking together in pyjamas to behind-the-scenes at performance dress rehearsals and backstage concert moments.

=== Katy Perry ===
- Original air date: 14 December 2011
- Unofficial rating: 198,800 (1.09%)

Katy Perry invites Perez to have an exclusive look behind the scenes of her latest video for new single "The One That Got Away". He then joins the popstar on her UK tour and is treated to exclusive access to her closed set. Perez and Katy also discuss topics ranging from her (now ex) husband Russell Brand, her early Christian music career and her love of touring.

=== Kelly Rowland ===
- Original air date: 21 December 2011
- Unofficial rating: 198,200 (1%)

Perez gets up close and personal with The X Factor UK judge, former Destiny's Child member and solo artist Kelly Rowland. Perez is with her as she gets ready for a big TV performance to debut her new single "Motivation" off of her new album. They chat about Kelly's friendship with Beyoncé Knowles, her troubled and estranged father, and on her own image. Perez goes behind the scenes at dance rehearsals at the world-famous Universal City walk, for simulated skydiving and bull riding.

=== Enrique Iglesias ===
- Original air date: 28 December 2011
- Unofficial rating: ?

Perez and Enrique travel together to the famous Staples Center in downtown Los Angeles where Enrique, who has been on tour with Pitbull and Prince Royce for the past 12 months will be performing to over 20,000 fans. They chat about everything from the old-school tape recorder Enrique still carries around to write songs with to his "low maintenance" attitude and lack of diva demands. Includes backstage banter and a fan meet and greet.
