= Symphony No. 5 (Henze) =

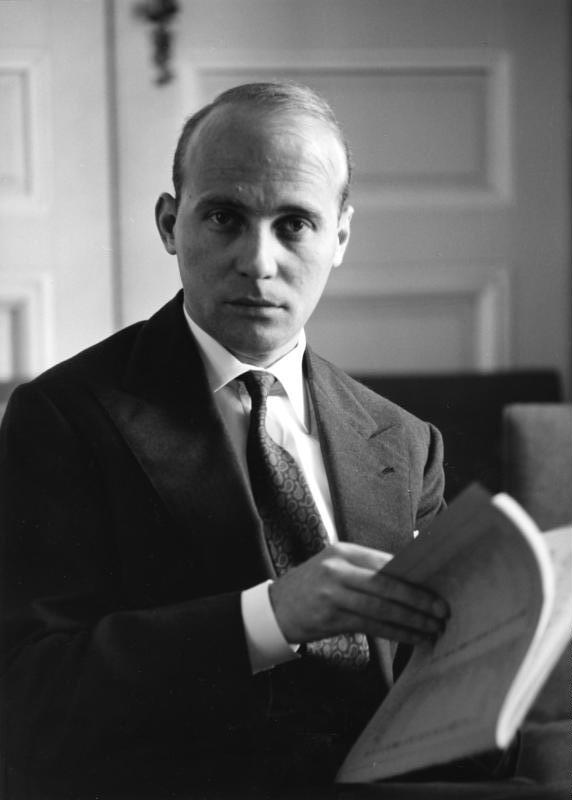
Hans Werner Henze in 1960

Symphony No. 5 by Hans Werner Henze was written in 1962.

Scored for large orchestra, it is in three movements, the first of which quotes directly from the aria My own, my own from Henze's opera Elegie für junge Liebende (Elegy for Young Lovers). This melodic fragment reappears in the lyrical adagio, which takes the form of a series of slow cadenzas for alto flute, viola and cor anglais over hushed strings. The finale is 32 miniature variations on the cadenza material of the slow movement.

Henze composed the symphony for the New York Philharmonic, which premiered the work on May 18, 1963, under Leonard Bernstein. Although it was assumed that, if anywhere, New York was celebrated in the music, Henze later wrote that in the work

I am dealing with... dramatic portrayals of sensual conflicts and joys prompted by the sensuous happiness of 20th century Rome, its people, its countryside and surroundings, and even by its somewhat harder dialect in comparison to that of Naples where I previously lived.

In 1965 the symphony was recorded by the Berlin Philharmonic Orchestra under the composer. A broadcast of the world premiere, with Bernstein conducting, was released by the New York Philharmonic as part of a Bernstein Live set.
