= Sarah Rose Etter =

American novelist

- Education: Pennsylvania State University (BA); Rosemont College (MFA)
- Occupation: Author
- Writing career
- Genre: Experimental literature
- Notable awards: Shirley Jackson Award (2019)
- Website: www.sarahroseetter.com

Sarah Rose Etter is an American author of experimental fiction. Her novels include Ripe, and The Book of X, which won the 2019 Shirley Jackson Award for Novel. Her work has appeared in The New York Times, The Atlantic, Time, Vice, and The Cut. She currently lives in Los Angeles, California.

== Career ==
Etter received her B.A. in English from Pennsylvania State University, and received her M.F.A. in Fiction from Rosemont College.

Her short story collection Tongue Party was selected by writer and judge Deb Olin Unferth as the winner of the 2010 Caketrain Chapbook Competition. Tongue Party was later translated into French (as Hommes sous verre) by Véronique Béghain and published by éditions do. A review in [PANK] praised the collection, stating that "[Etter] takes you into this disturbing world with her phrasing; she takes you to a place that is a rabbit hole, a witching well, an unframed mirror." LitStack's review praised the book as well, stating that "Sarah Rose Etter uses all of the tools and talents at her disposal — her memory, her body, her touch — to pack her small stories with meaning and emotion. The stories are dark, twisted, beautiful and always poetic."

Etter's first novel, The Book of X, was published by Two Dollar Radio in 2019. It tells the story of the life of a young woman born with a literal knot in her stomach, making her way through a surreal landscape. Kirkus Reviews dubbed The Book of X "a relentlessly original look at what it means to exist in a female body." The Star Tribune's review of the novel noted that "Etter writes her weird world with elastic prose, as stripped-down at certain points as it is lyrical in others." Cleveland Review of Books said it "blurs the lines between the real and the surreal, forcing readers to confront the sense of danger the uncanny evokes." The Book of X was a finalist for the 2019 Believer Book Award, a finalist for the 2019 Golden Poppy Book Award, and longlisted for the 2019 VCU Cabell First Novelist Award.

Etter's second novel, Ripe, was published by Scribner in July 2023. It follows a woman whose dream job with a cutthroat Silicon Valley start-up pushes her into increasingly unethical territory while she navigates an unplanned pregnancy and the relentless pull of the black hole that has been her constant companion since birth. The New York Times said the novel was sharp, absorbing, and unforgettable. In a starred review, Kirkus Reviews described the novel as "lurid, tense, and compelling." Publishers Weekly, also in a starred review, described the novel as "a scathing look at corporate greed and its many dire consequences, this is deeply felt and cathartic."

Etter has also written extensively about visual art, and a quote from Carol Rama serves as the epigraph for The Book of X. Etter delivered a keynote address at the 2017 Society for the Study of American Women Writers conference, held at Bordeaux Montaigne University. The title of her address was "Bizarre Feminism: Surrealism in the Service of a Movement."

== Works ==
- —— (2011). Tongue Party. Caketrain.
- —— (2019). The Book of X (1st paperback ed.). Columbus, OH: Two Dollar Radio. ISBN 9781937512811.
- —— (2023). Ripe (1st hardcover ed.). New York: Scribner. ISBN 9781668011638.
