= Candy Mountain =

1987 film

- Theatrical release poster
- Directed by: Robert Frank; Rudy Wurlitzer
- Written by: Rudy Wurlitzer
- Produced by: Philippe Diaz
- Starring: Kevin J. O'Connor; Harris Yulin; Tom Waits; Bulle Ogier; Roberts Blossom
- Cinematography: Pio Corradi
- Edited by: Jennifer Augé
- Music by: Dr. John; David Johansen; Rita MacNeil; Leon Redbone
- Distributed by: International Film Exchange (IFEX); Republic Pictures
- Release dates: August 10, 1987 (Locarno Film Festival); February 19, 1988 (United States)
- Running time: 103 minutes
- Countries: Switzerland; Canada; France
- Language: English
- Box office: $7,119

Candy Mountain is a 1987 drama film directed by Robert Frank and Rudy Wurlitzer, and starring Kevin J. O'Connor, Harris Yulin and Tom Waits. Set in New York City and Cape Breton, Nova Scotia, it is categorized as a drama and road movie, drawing heavy inspiration from 1960s genres of film and music. The film premiered at the 1987 Locarno Film Festival.

Frank's third collaboration with American novelist and screenwriter Wurlitzer, the latter explains the story as a combination of the lives of both him and Frank. He stated, "We both live in New York and we both have houses in Cape Breton. In a way Elmore's route was the same as ours. Music and musicians, their dilemmas and lifestyles, mean a lot to Robert and myself."

== Plot ==
Set in New York City, Candy Mountain tells the tale of a struggling guitarist named Julius. After he promises a rock star he can find an elusive guitar maker and acquire his valuable products, he sets off on a quest to Canada to find the legendary Elmore Silk, in order to strike a deal with him. Along his journey via T-Bird, Volkswagen, and hitchhiking, he experiences a series of encounters and misadventures with those who claim to have known the reclusive Silk. Each encounter provides him with valuable insight into the kind of man Silk is, and his journey is filled with "musicians playing small roles: David Johansen as the star who wants to buy up the guitars, Tom Waits as Elmore's middle-class brother, Joe Strummer as a punk, Dr. John as Elmore's cranky son-in-law, Leon Redbone as one-half of a peculiar Canadian family who enjoy imprisoning passers-by". As he ventures further North, and reaches Canada, he is finally in the presence of the famous guitar maker he had been searching for. Once he meets Silk, he is faced with the realization that financial gain is nothing compared to the development of one's artistic ability.

== Cast ==
- Kevin J. O'Connor as Julius
- Harris Yulin as Elmore Silk
- Tom Waits as Al Silk
- Bulle Ogier as Cornelia
- Roberts Blossom as Archie
- Leon Redbone as Leon
- Dr. John as Henry
- Rita MacNeil as Winnie
- Joe Strummer as Mario
- Laurie Metcalf as Alice
- Jayne Eastwood as Lucille
- Kazuko Oshima as Koko Yamamoto
- Eric Mitchell as Gunther
- Mary Joy as Couple
- Robert Joy as Couple
- Arto Lindsay as Alston
- Mary Margaret O'Hara as Darlene
- David Johansen as Keith Burns
- Tony 'Machine' Krasinski as Musician
- Susan Kirschner as Suzie
- "Dee" Emile de Antonio as Lou Sultan
- Jose Soto as Musician's Son
- Bob Maroff as Gas-station Attendant
- Rockets Redglare as Van Driver
- Nancy Fish as Maid
- Dan Archie Cummings as Gas-station Owner
- Liz Porrazzo as Lola
- Roy MacEachern as Customs Officer
- Wayne Robson as Buddy Burke
- Eric House as Doctor

== Production ==
In an interview, Robert Frank stated that the film reflected his own life and journey from New York City to Nova Scotia. Additional inspiration was drawn partially from Wurlitzer's previous films and his experience of having a career on the road. The film's script was developed from a book of photography that was built upon Frank and Wurlitzer's experiences from living in Nova Scotia. The portrayal of the United States in the film is that of a "twisted industrial landscape", whereas Canada is seen as a "slow, peaceful land". The central theme of the film is the journey between the two countries, and is "exemplary of the road film genre". Frank credits his opportunity to live quietly and view nature as contributing to his own self betterment and his work as a filmmaker, which he exemplifies in the film.

== Reception ==
=== Release ===
The film had it world premiere on August 10, 1987 at the Locarno Film Festival. It was also featured in the 1987 Festival of Festivals (now the Toronto International Film Festival) at the Roy Thompson Hall in Toronto. The film was shown during the closing night of the festival in the Perspective Canada Section, alongside Jacqueline Levitin's Eva: Guerrillera (1988), and John N. Smith's National Film Board of Canada production Train of Dreams (1987). The film received mostly favorable views from the festival goers and was considered a critical success.

=== Critical response ===
The film generally received positive reviews from critics. Caryn James of The New York Times wrote, "...seems to be a small, quirky film, but it easily assumes the weight, ambition and success that many larger films aim for and miss." J. Hoberman of The Village Voice wrote, "In a way, this shaggy-dog hipster road film is Frank's ultimate work -- evoking the end of the road and even the end of Endsville-but he has persevered." Despite mostly favourable reviews for the film, O'Connor's performance was criticized, with the Ottawa Citizen stating that "if [the production] had cast a different lead (someone like Mickey Rourke would have been ideal), Candy Mountain would have been much better than it is". As of March 2018, film review aggregator Rotten Tomatoes had issued a 100% rating based on reviews from 8 critics.

=== Home video release ===
In 2009, Candy Mountain screenwriter and co-director Rudy Wurlitzer sent PopMatters journalist Rodger Jacobs a screener copy of the film since it had not as yet seen a DVD release and Jacobs claimed to have business colleagues working in film preservation. After viewing the film, Rodgers wrote, "I assured Rudy that there would be no problem in convincing a distribution entity of the commercial value of the film for wide release in the DVD market."

=== Awards ===
San Sebastián International Film Festival

- 1987: Won, "Silver Seashell Award"
