= Rudy Wurlitzer =

American novelist and screenwriter (born 1937)

- Born: January 3, 1937 (age 89); Cincinnati, Ohio, U.S.
- Occupation: Writer
- Spouse: Lynn Davis
- Writing career
- Language: English
- Genres: Novelist, screenwriting, Western, experimental
- Notable works: Pat Garrett and Billy the Kid; Two-Lane Blacktop; Nog

Rudolph "Rudy" Wurlitzer (born January 3, 1937) is an American novelist and screenwriter.

Wurlitzer's fiction includes Nog, Flats, Quake, Slow Fade, and Drop Edge of Yonder. He is also the author of the travel memoir, Hard Travel to Sacred Places, which recounts a spiritual journey through Asia following the death of his wife Lynn Davis's 21-year-old son.

== Biography ==
Born in Cincinnati, Ohio, Wurlitzer's family moved to New York City shortly after his birth. He is a descendant of Rudolph Wurlitzer (1831–1914), founder of the jukebox company of the same name, though the family fortune had significantly diminished by the time Wurlitzer came of age in the 1950s. At 17, he worked on an oil tanker, beginning to write during this first trip. He attended Columbia University and served in the Army. He continued to travel, spending time in Paris and on Majorca, where he worked as a secretary for author Robert Graves. He credits Graves with teaching him to "write short sentences." He returned to New York City in the mid-1960s, where he met and befriended artists Claes Oldenburg, Robert Frank, and Philip Glass. He later collaborated with each of them. He is married to photographer Lynn Davis and divides his time between homes in upstate New York and Nova Scotia.

== Novels ==
Wurlitzer's first novel, the experimental and psychedelic Nog (1968), was compared to the work of Thomas Pynchon. It was followed in 1970 by the minimalist, Samuel Beckett-influenced Flats. Quake, published in 1974, is set in a post-apocalyptic Los Angeles where humanity's worst impulses are enacted in a single, continuous narrative. The 1984 novel Slow Fade, also set in Hollywood, is a portrait of an aging, formerly brilliant film director trying to reconcile with his past and his inner turmoil. It has been suggested that Slow Fade was influenced by Wurlitzer's experiences with director Sam Peckinpah on the set of Pat Garrett & Billy the Kid, for which Wurlitzer wrote the screenplay. His most recent novel is The Drop Edge Of Yonder, which originated from a screenplay titled Zebulon that had undergone various iterations over the years. Directors such as Peckinpah and Hal Ashby were attached to the project at different times, but the film was never produced. He was also an uncredited co-writer on the scripts of Coming Home and Malone.

== Screenplays and other work ==
Wurlitzer's first script, Glen and Randa, co-written with Jim McBride and released in 1969, also explored a post-apocalyptic setting. Monte Hellman, who directed films for Roger Corman, read Wurlitzer's novel Nog and approached him to write the screenplay for Two-Lane Blacktop. The film became a cult classic, and the script was printed in full in the April 1971 issue of Esquire. While working in Hollywood, Wurlitzer also wrote screenplays for Walker (1987), directed by Alex Cox; Candy Mountain (1988), which he co-directed with Robert Frank; and Little Buddha (1993), directed by Bernardo Bertolucci. At the time of Michelangelo Antonioni's death, Wurlitzer was working on a script with him.

He wrote the libretto for Philip Glass's opera In the Penal Colony and has written four television scripts for 100 Centre Street, directed by Sidney Lumet.

== Filmography ==
- Glen and Randa (co-written with Jim McBride) (1969, Writer)
- Two-Lane Blacktop (directed by Monte Hellman) (1971, Writer) - Hot Rod Driver (actor)
- Pat Garrett and Billy the Kid (directed by Sam Peckinpah) (1973, Writer) - O'Folliard (actor)
- Coming Home (directed by Hal Ashby) (1978, Writer—uncredited)
- America (directed by Robert Downey Sr.) (1986) - George, the Hit Man (actor)
- Walker (directed by Alex Cox) (1987, Writer) - Morgan (actor)
- Malone (directed by Harley Cokeliss) (1987, Writer—uncredited)
- Candy Mountain (co-directed with Robert Frank) (1988, Writer/co-director)
- Homo Faber (aka Voyager) (directed by Volker Schlöndorff) (1991, Writer)
- Wind (directed by Carroll Ballard) (1992, Writer)
- Shadow of the Wolf (directed by Jacques Dorfmann and Pierre Magny) (1992, Writer)
- Little Buddha (directed by Bernardo Bertolucci) (1993, Writer)

== Publications ==
- Nog, published 1968 by Random House; reissued in 2009 by Two Dollar Radio
- Flats, published 1971 by Random House, reissued in 2009 by Two Dollar Radio
- Quake, published 1974 by E. P. Dutton, reissued in 2009 by Two Dollar Radio
- Slow Fade, published 1984 by Alfred A. Knopf, reissued in 2011 by Drag City
- Hard Travel to Sacred Places, published 1995 by Shambhala
- The Drop Edge of Yonder, published 2008 by Two Dollar Radio
