= Lynn Davis (photographer) =

American photographer

- Born: 1944 (age 81–82); Minneapolis, Minnesota, U.S.
- Known for: Photography
- Spouse: Rudy Wurlitzer
- Website: lynndavisphotography.com

Lynn Davis is an American photographer known for her large-scale black-and-white photographs which are widely collected publicly and privately and are internationally exhibited.

== Biography ==
Born in Minneapolis, Minnesota, in 1944, Davis studied at University of Colorado between 1962 and 1964, and at the University of Minnesota from 1964 to 1966. She received her Bachelor of Fine Arts from the San Francisco Art Institute in 1970, and in 1974 she began her career as an apprentice to Berenice Abbott.

Davis' first exhibition hung at the International Center of Photography in New York City in 1979, alongside her close friend Robert Mapplethorpe. After her first trip to Greenland, in 1986, she gave up photographing the human form, shifting her lens toward the monumental landscapes and cultural/architectural icons for which she is renowned.

Davis lives in Hudson, New York with her husband, writer Rudy Wurlitzer. Her prints appear in the permanent collections of the Museum of Modern Art, the Los Angeles County Museum of Art, the Chicago Museum of Contemporary Art, and the Museum of Fine Arts, Houston, among others. In 1999, the J. Paul Getty Museum held an exhibition of Davis' prints, and a solo show, Africa, was held at the Center for Creative Photography in Tucson, Arizona in 1999.

== Publications ==
Books showcasing Davis' work include:

- Ice: 1986-2007, New York: Melcher Media, 2015 (Monograph, with foreword by: Patti Smith)
- Sacred Landscapes: The Threshold Between Worlds, New York: Sterling, 2010 (Collaborative project with text by: A.T. Mann
- "Space Project," Monacelli Press/Random House, November 2009 (With text by: Alan Weisman)
- Illumination, New York: DK Adult, 2007 (Monograph, with text by: Pico Iyer)
- Persia, Paris: Galerie Karsten Greve, 2006 (Exhibition Catalog)
- Water, New York: Edwynn Houk Gallery, 2005 (Exhibition Catalog)
- American Monument, New York: Monacelli Press, 2004 (Monograph, with text by: Witold Rybczynski)
- Ice, New York: Edwynn Houk Gallery, 2001 (Exhibition Catalog)
- Lynn Davis, New York: Edwynn Houk Gallery, 2000 (Exhibition Catalog)
- Monument, Santa Fe: Arena Editions, 1999 (Monograph with text by: Patti Smith & Rudolph Wurlitzer)
- Bodywork: 1978-1985, Kilchberg/Zurich: Edition Stemmle, 1994 (Monograph)
- In Response to Place: Phototgraphs from the Nature Conservancy's Last Great Places, Washington D.C.: The Nature Conservancy (pages 80–89, also includes works by photographers: Lee Friedlander, Annie Leibovitz, Sally Mann and Mary Ellen Mark, among others)
- Wonders of the African World (Henry Louis Gates Jr.; New York: Knopf, Fall 1999)

Her work also appears in the following publications (non-comprehensive list):

- El Silencio, pages 70–78 (Matador, Issue K, 2008)
- An Eye for the Sacred, pages 56–63, 94 and 97 (Shambhala Sun, January 2008)
- An Artist’s Portrayal of China, page 31 (Northeast Antique & Auction, 2003)
- The Questing Eye, pages 74–77 (House & Garden, 2003)
- Abitareverona Magazine, No. 3 (2002)
- Along the Silk Route, pages 51–57 (Portfolio: China, Shambhala Sun, September 2002)
- Reportage dal Mondo dei Sogni, page 53 (Denis Curti; Vivi Milano, Belle Arti, September 2002)
- Linee di Ghiaccio (Tempo Libero, September 2002)
- John Kane: Gehlek Rinpoche Likes It That Way, pages 45–50 (Shambhala Sun, July 2002)
- Ice Memory, pages 30–37 (Elizabeth Kolbert; New Yorker, January 2002)
- Les Line, page 124 (Audubon, March–April 2002)
- Dal Sudan alla Groenlandia a Caccia di Architetture Naturale, page 9 (Francesca Memeo; La Stampa, 2002)
- Body Icons, page 32 (Athens, Greece, Photographic Center of Skopelos, 1998)
- Aperture, Moments of Grace Spirit in the American Landscape, page 3 (New York, Aperture (magazine), 1998)
- Sea Change: The Seascape in Contemporary Photography, page 25 (James Hamilton-Peterson and Trudy Wilner Stack; Tucson, AZ: Center for Creative Photography, 1998)
- Water Proof (Lisbon, Portugal : Centro Cultural de Belém, 1998)

== Awards ==
- Academy Award in Art from the American Academy of Arts and Letters
- Creative Artist Public Service Program Grant
