= Two-Lane Blacktop =

1971 film by Monte Hellman

- Theatrical poster
- Directed by: Monte Hellman
- Screenplay by: Rudolph Wurlitzer; Will Corry
- Story by: Will Corry
- Produced by: Michael S. Laughlin
- Starring: James Taylor; Warren Oates; Laurie Bird; Dennis Wilson
- Cinematography: Jack Deerson; Gregory Sandor (Note: Credited as "Photographic Advisor".)
- Edited by: Monte Hellman
- Production company: Michael Laughlin Enterprises
- Distributed by: Universal Pictures
- Release date: July 7, 1971
- Running time: 102 minutes
- Country: United States
- Language: English
- Budget: $875,000

Two-Lane Blacktop is a 1971 American road film directed and edited by Monte Hellman, from a screenplay by Rudy Wurlitzer and Will Corry. It stars musicians James Taylor and Dennis Wilson, Warren Oates, and Laurie Bird in the leading roles. The sparse, existentialist plot follows a group of street racers during a cross-country race through the American Southwest.

Universal Pictures commissioned the film in the wake of Easy Rider's monumental success. Hellman, who had previously worked in low-budget and independent films, developed the screenplay with Wurlitzer, then-known mainly as an underground writer, during an actual cross-country road trip. Filming took place in locations around the Southwest between August and October 1970.

On initial release, the film received generally positive reviews, but was not a commercial success. Over the years, it developed the reputation of a sleeper hit and a cult classic, and has been reevaluated as a major work of the New Hollywood movement. In 2012, the US Library of Congress selected the film for preservation in the United States National Film Registry as being "culturally, historically, or aesthetically significant."

== Plot ==
Two street racers—the Driver and the Mechanic—live on the road in their highly modified, primer-gray 1955 Chevrolet 150 two-door sedan drag car, drifting from town to town and earning income by challenging locals to impromptu races. While driving east on Route 66 from Needles, California, they pick up the Girl, a hitchhiker they meet at a diner in Flagstaff, Arizona. Though the Driver develops a crush on her, she sleeps with the Mechanic while he is out drinking.

In New Mexico, they encounter another driver, GTO, on the highway. A tense rivalry forms between the groups. Despite GTO not being an obvious street racer and displaying little automotive knowledge, a cross-country race to Washington, D.C., is proposed. The Driver insists the prize should be “pinks” (i.e., ownership of the loser's car). Along the way, GTO picks up several hitchhikers, including an insistent homosexual man. When GTO's inexperience becomes clear, he, the Driver, and the Mechanic form an uneasy alliance; the Driver even takes the wheel for a stretch when GTO grows fatigued.

Needing funds, the trio competes at a Memphis race track. After the Driver finishes his race, he discovers the Girl has left with GTO. He chases them to a diner, where the Girl has just rejected GTO's suggestion to visit Chicago. The Driver proposes a trip to Columbus, Ohio, for car parts, but she rebuffs him as well, instead leaving with a stranger on a motorcycle and abandoning her belongings in the parking lot.

Later, GTO picks up two soldiers and boasts that he won his car by defeating two men in a cross-country race involving a custom 1955 Chevrolet 150. The film concludes abruptly with the Driver racing a Chevrolet El Camino at an airstrip in East Tennessee.

== Cast ==
All of the characters in the screenplay and in the film are officially unnamed, although about midway through the film The Driver, while talking to GTO, refers to The Girl as "Higgins, whatever her name is"

- James Taylor as The Driver
- Warren Oates as GTO
- Laurie Bird as The Girl
- Dennis Wilson as The Mechanic
- Rudolph Wurlitzer as Hot Rod Driver
- Bill Keller as Texas Hitchhiker
- H.D. Stanton as Oklahoma Hitchhiker
- Richard Ruth as the Needles gas station attendant
- Don Samuels and Charles Moore as Texas Policemen
- Alan Vint as Man in Roadhouse
- George Mitchell as Truck Driver at Accident
- A. J. Solari as Tennessee Hitchhiker
- Katherine Squire as Old Woman
- Melissa Hellman as Little Girl with Old Woman
- James Mitchum as Man at Race Track
- Kreag Caffey as Boy with Motorcycle

== Production ==
=== Development ===
Two-Lane Blacktop originated with producer Michael Laughlin who had a two-picture deal with CBS Cinema Center Films. He convinced the production company to pay Will Corry $100,000 for his original story, about two men, one black and one white, who drive across the country followed by a young girl, which was inspired by his own cross-country journey in 1968. Returning from Italy after a film project had fallen through, Hellman was introduced to Laughlin who presented him with two projects, one of which was Two-Lane Blacktop. He asked Hellman to direct, who found Corry's story "interesting, but not fully realized". Hellman agreed to make the film only if another screenwriter was hired to rewrite the script and Laughlin agreed. A friend of Hellman's recommended underground writer Rudolph Wurlitzer. Hellman read his novel Nog and was impressed enough to hire Wurlitzer, who began reading Corry's story, but gave up after five pages. Hellman and Wurlitzer agreed to keep the basic idea of the cross-country race as well as the characters of the Driver, the Mechanic and the Girl. Wurlitzer invented the GTO character and the rest of the supporting cast. To prepare for writing the script, he stayed in a Los Angeles motel and read car magazines, as well as hanging out with several obsessive mechanics and "stoner car freaks" in the San Fernando Valley. Wurlitzer said that he did not know much about cars, but did "know something about being lost on the road". He wrote a new script in four weeks.

=== Casting ===
In February 1970, Hellman began location scouting and was a few weeks from principal photography when Cinema Center suddenly canceled the project. He shopped the script around to several Hollywood studios that liked it, but wanted a say in the casting. However, Ned Tanen, a young executive at Universal Pictures gave Hellman $850,000 to make the film and gave him control of the final cut. Hellman saw a picture of James Taylor on a billboard on the Sunset Strip and asked the musician to come and do a screen test.

Four days before beginning principal photography the role of the Mechanic was still not cast. Hellman was desperate and tested people he met in garages. A friend of casting director Fred Roos suggested musician Dennis Wilson. Wilson was the last actor cast and Hellman chose him because he felt that the musician "had lived that role, that he really grew up with cars".

=== Filming and post-production ===
Principal photography began on August 13, 1970, in Los Angeles and lasted for eight weeks with a crew of 30, three matching Chevrolets and two matching G.T.O.s traveling through the southwest towards Memphis, Tennessee. Gregory Sandor shot the entire film, but due to union issues, camera operator Jack Deerson was credited as the director of photography, while Sandor was credited as the film's "photographic advisor". Hellman insisted on going across country, like the characters in the film, because he felt it was the only way to convince the audience that the characters raced across the United States. He said, "I knew it would affect the actors — and it did, obviously. It affected everybody". Hellman took an unconventional approach of not letting his three lead, inexperienced actors read the script. Instead, he gave them pages of dialogue on the day of shooting. The actors felt uncomfortable with this approach. In particular, James Taylor, used to having control when it came to his music, was upset at being unable to read the script in advance. Hellman eventually gave him permission to do so, but Taylor never did read it.

Hellman shot almost the entire script as written. The first cut of the film was three-and-a-half hours long, in which Hellman was the editor. "I can't look over someone's shoulder. I need my hand on the brake". He had control of the final cut, but was contractually obliged to deliver a film no longer than two hours. The final version ran 105 minutes. In their April 1971 cover story, Esquire magazine proclaimed Two-Lane Blacktop, "film of the year". Hellman initially thought that the Esquire article would be good publicity for the film, but in hindsight was not, because "I think it raised people's expectations. They couldn't accept the movie for what it was". There was a lot of advance buzz about the film, but Lew Wasserman, head of the studio saw the film and hated it. He refused to promote it and when it opened in New York City on the Fourth of July weekend, there were no newspaper ads promoting it.

== Soundtrack ==
Unlike other existential road movies of the time (such as Easy Rider and Vanishing Point), Two-Lane Blacktop does not rely heavily on music, nor was a soundtrack album released. The music featured in the film covers many genres, including rock, folk, blues, country, bluegrass, and R&B. James Taylor and Dennis Wilson did not contribute any music.

However, there are some notable tracks featured in the film, including "Moonlight Drive" by The Doors, "Maybellene" performed by John Hammond, the traditional folk tune "Stealin'" performed by Arlo Guthrie, and "Me and Bobby McGee" performed by the song's composer Kris Kristofferson. A song titled "Truckload Of Art" written and performed by Terry Allen can be briefly heard coming out of the GTO.

In 2003 Plain Records issued a tribute album made in honor of this cult classic called "You Can Never Go Fast Enough" featuring exclusive tracks by Wilco, Sonic Youth, Will Oldham/Alan Licht, Calexico & Giant Sand, Suntanama, Steffen Basho-Junghans, Charalambides, Mark Eitzel/Marc Capelle, Roy Montgomery and Alvarius B with rare tracks by Cat Power, Roscoe Holcomb, Lead Belly and Sandy Bull.

== Reception ==
Esquire magazine published the entire screenplay in its April 1971 issue, and referred to it on the cover as "Our nomination for movie of the year", though it failed to include any explanation for this decision or any critical commentary, and also failed to review the film when it was released that fall. The film opened and disappeared so quickly that at the end of 1971, Esquire included its own cover prediction as part of its annual Dubious Achievements of the Year Awards.

Roger Ebert gave the film three out of four stars and wrote, "What I liked about Two-Lane Blacktop was the sense of life that occasionally sneaked through, particularly in the character of G.T.O. (Warren Oates). He is the only character who is fully occupied with being himself (rather than the instrument of a metaphor), and so we get the sense we've met somebody". In his review for The New York Times, Vincent Canby wrote, "Two-Lane Blacktop is a far from perfect film (those metaphors keep blocking the road), but it has been directed, acted, photographed and scored (underscored, happily) with the restraint and control of an aware, mature filmmaker". Time magazine's Jay Cocks wrote, "The film is immaculately crafted, funny and quite beautiful, resonant with a lingering mood of loss and loneliness ... Not a single frame in the film is wasted. Even the small touches — the languid tension while refueling at a back-country gas station or the piercing sound of an ignition buzzer — have their own intricate worth". In his review for the Village Voice, J. Hoberman wrote, "Two-Lane Blacktop is a movie of achingly eloquent landscapes and absurdly inert characters". In his review for the Chicago Reader, Jonathan Rosenbaum wrote, "The movie starts off as a narrative, but gradually grows into something much more abstract — it's unsettling, but also beautiful".

The film has since become a cult film. On Rotten Tomatoes it has an approval rating of 93% based on reviews from 40 critics. The site's critical consensus reads, "Beautifully directed and utterly unique, Two-Lane Blacktop captures the spirit of its era as smoothly as it evokes the feeling of the open road." On Metacritic it has a score of 89 out of 100, based on reviews from 15 critics, indicating "universal acclaim". The Library of Congress selected the film for preservation in the United States National Film Registry in 2012 as being "culturally, historically, or aesthetically significant."

== Home video ==
Two-Lane Blacktop was unavailable on video for years because Universal Studios only released a few films from their catalog each year and it was not a priority. In 1994, Seattle's Scarecrow Video invited Hellman to show the film at their store. They proceeded to collect 2,000 signatures, including Werner Herzog's, for a petition to get the film released on video. Both People magazine and Film Comment ran articles about the store's effort and the film.

For years, Universal had been looking for a partner to give Two-Lane Blacktop a proper release befitting its cult film status. However, efforts to release it had always been hampered by issues with music rights, in particular the use of "Moonlight Drive" by The Doors. Director William Lustig, also a "technical advisor" for Anchor Bay, got Hellman to approach the surviving band members to get their approval. In 1999, Michigan-based Anchor Bay Entertainment licensed the film from Universal and released it on VHS and DVD, with an audio commentary by Hellman and associate producer Gary Kurtz and a documentary on Hellman directed by George Hickenlooper. The limited edition DVD was packed in a metal tin and extras included a 48-page booklet featuring behind-the-scenes photographs and liner notes about director Monte Hellman, a 5" X 7" theatrical poster replica, and a die-struck miniature car key chain. Anchor Bay released a regular edition without the poster and key chain.

At a July 2007 screening of the film, Hellman revealed that the Criterion Collection was releasing a two-disc special edition DVD that featured a new documentary made by Hellman that included an interview with Kristofferson about how "Me and Bobby McGee" has become so closely associated with the film. This DVD set was released on December 11, 2007. Two-Lane Blacktop is available on Blu-ray disc from UK distributor Masters of Cinema, having been released on 23 January 2012; this release was marked as a Region B disc, which would only play in Blu-ray disc players in Europe, Africa and Australia. The Criterion Collection released a U.S. Region A Blu-ray edition in January 2013.

== Legacy ==
Two-Lane Blacktop is notable as a time capsule film of U.S. Route 66 during the pre-interstate highway era, and for its stark footage and minimal dialogue. It has been compared to similar road movies with an existentialist message from the era, such as Vanishing Point, Easy Rider, and Electra Glide in Blue.

Brock Yates, organizer of the Cannonball Run, cites Two-Lane Blacktop as an inspiration for the race and commented on it in his Car and Driver column announcing the first Cannonball.

== See also ==
- List of American films of 1971
- List of cult films
