= Andreas Kohn =

German operatic bass

Andreas Kohn (born 11 March 1964) is a German operatic bass and Dozent.

== Life ==
Kohn was born in Munich. After his education at the Mozarteum University Salzburg, where he studied with his father Kammersänger Karl-Christian Kohn and graduated with distinction in 1987, he began his career in the opera studio of the Bayerische Staatsoper. During this time, he was a finalist in the Bertelsmann Stiftung New Voices Competition, a finalist in the Mozartfest-Wettbewerb für Gesang in Würzburg and a prizewinner in the Bundeswettbewerb Gesang Berlin (scholarship of the Richard Wagner Society Bayreuth).

His first professional contract took the bass singer to the Hessisches Staatstheater Wiesbaden, where he sang, among other roles, Don Basilio (Il barbiere di Siviglia), Masetto (Don Giovanni), Colline (La Bohème) and Fafner (Das Rheingold). In 1993, Daniel Barenboim engaged him in the ensemble of the Staatsoper Unter den Linden. There he took on roles in his field, among others Don Fernando (Fidelio), Don Basilio ('The Barber of Seville), the King in (Aida) and Kaspar (Der Freischütz).

Guest appearances and concert tours have taken Kohn to, among others, the Salzburg Festival (Salome, conductor: Christoph von Dohnányi, director: Luc Bondy; Don Giovanni, Masetto, conductor: Daniel Barenboim, director: Patrice Chéreau), to Cleveland and Israel, to Tokyo and Rome (Elektra and Parsifal concertante, conductor: Giuseppe Sinopoli), Geneva, Barcelona, Venice, Brussels and Athens, the Semperoper Dresden and the Stuttgart State Opera. in 2002, Kohn returned to his hometown of Munich, where he has since appeared as a guest at the Bavarian State Opera among others in Carmen, The Magic Flute Salome, Billy Budd, Moses und Aron, Tosca, Les Troyens, Nabucco, Die Meistersinger von Nürnberg. There, he worked among others with Kent Nagano and Zubin Mehta. In the oratorio and concert repertoire he sang among others with Enoch zu Guttenberg, and Peter Schreier. Kohn also took master classes in Lieder singing with Paul Schilhafsky in Salzburg and Hans Hotter in Munich. Since 2004, Kohn has held a teaching position for singing at the Bayerische Theaterakademie August Everding, and since 2014 at the Hochschule für Musik und Theater München.

== Recording ==
- Ludwig van Beethoven: Fidelio, La Fenice/Venice, 1998, Mondo Musica MFON 20141
- Ludwig van Beethoven: Finale Fidelio, United Nations 50th Anniversary Concert, conductor: Georg Solti, 1995, Decca 448901-2
- Manfred Gurlitt: Soldaten, DSO Berlin, conductor: Gerd Albrecht, 1999, Orfeo C 482992 H
- Paul Hindemith: Die Harmonie der Welt, conductor: Marek Janowski, RSO Berlin, 2002, Wergo WER 66522
- Engelbert Humperdinck: Königskinder, conductor: Fabio Luisi, Münchner Rundfunkorchester, 1996, Calig CAL 50968-70
- Wilhelm Kienzl: Don Quixote, conductor: Gustav Kuhn, 1998, Deutschlandradio, cpo 999873-2
- Wolfgang Amadeus Mozart: Don Giovanni, conductor: Martin Haselböck, Wiener Akademie, 1991, Novalis 150084-2
- Richard Strauss: Des Esels Schatten, narrator: Peter Ustinov, 1997, Koch Schwann 3-1792-2 H1
- Richard Strauss: Friedenstag, conductor: Wolfgang Sawallisch, 1987, Bayerischer Rundfunk, EMI classics 7243 5568502 5
- Richard Strauss: Salome, Wiener Philharmoniker, 1995, Decca 444178-2

== Contributions for television ==
- Zirkus um Zauberflöte, director: Percy Adlon/George Tabori, Partie: Sarastro, Luna Film 1998
- United Nations 50th Anniversary Concert Live, Télévision Suisse Romande 1995
- Wiedereröffnung des Prinzregententheaters live, ZDF 1987
