= Joshua Mohr =

American author (born 1976)

- Joshua Mohr reading at Modern Times Bookstore, San Francisco CA, in 2009
- Born: Joshua Mohr; July 8, 1976 (age 50)
- Education: San Francisco State University (BA), University of San Francisco (MFA)
- Occupation: Novelist
- Website: www.joshuamohr.net

Joshua Mohr (born July 8, 1976) is an American author.

== Biography ==
Joshua Mohr moved to the Bay Area (from Phoenix, AZ) in 1988, and currently lives in the Mission District of San Francisco, CA. He attended San Francisco State University for his undergraduate studies, where he received two Bachelor of Arts degrees: the first in history, the second in creative writing. He then went on to receive a Master of Fine Arts in creative writing at the University of San Francisco, where he graduated in 2005.

Joshua Mohr teaches creative writing at The Writing Salon in San Francisco and at the University of San Francisco.

== Reception ==
Reception to Mohr's work has been predominantly positive, receiving positive reviews from O Magazine and SF Gate. His novel Termite Parade was listed as an "Editor's Choice" by the New York Times in 2010.

== Bibliography ==
=== Novels ===
- Some Things that Meant the World to Me (2009)
- Termite Parade (2010)
- Damascus (2011)
- Fight Song: A Novel (2013)
- All This Life: A Novel (2015)
- Farsickness (2023)
- Saint the Terrifying (2024)

=== Memoirs ===
- Sirens (2017)
- Model Citizen (2021)

=== Short stories ===
- Dressing the Dead

=== Other publications ===
- Other Voices
- Cimarron Review
- Gulf Coast
- Pleiades
- recipes for hemlock (BPM Publishing, 2004), poetry, 55 pages, ISBN 9781312358126
