= Ann Saddlemyer =

Canadian academic

- Born: Eleanor Ann Saddlemyer; November 28, 1932 (age 93); Prince Albert, Saskatchewan, Canada
- Education: University of Saskatchewan Queen's University University of London
- Parent(s): Orrin Angus Saddlemyer; Elsie Sarah Ellis

Eleanor Ann Saddlemyer, OC FRSC MRIA (born 28 November 1932) is a Canadian academic, author, and expert in the history of Canadian theatre and Anglo-Irish literature.

== Early life and education ==
Ann Saddlemyer was born Eleanor Ann Saddlemyer on 28 November 1932 in Prince Albert, Saskatchewan. Her parents were Elsie Sarah (née Ellis) and Orrin Angus Saddlemyer. She was educated at a high school in Humboldt, Saskatchewan. She graduated from the University of Saskatchewan with a BA in 1953, followed by an MA in 1956 from Queen's University. She was awarded her PhD in 1961 from Bedford College of the University of London, and in 1991 received a DLitt from the University of Saskatchewan.

== Career ==
From 1956 to 1957 and 1960 to 1971, Saddlemyer taught at the University of Victoria in British Columbia. She was then appointed Professor of Drama and Professor of English in Victoria College at the University of Toronto in 1971. From 1971 to 1977, she served as Director of the Graduate Centre for Study of Drama at the University of Toronto. In 1975, she was the visiting Berg Professor at New York University. She was appointed the Master of Massey College in 1988, and held this post until her retirement in 1996. In 1965 and 1977, she was awarded a Guggenheim Fellowship.

Saddlemyer was the founding president of the Association for Canadian Theatre History, and served as the chair of the International Association for Anglo-Irish Literature. She was the co-general editor of the Cornell Yeats series of manuscripts, and the founding co-editor of the Canadian Journal of Theatre Research. She also served on the editorial boards of a number of other journals. She is a corresponding scholar of the Academy of the Shaw Festival, director of the publishers, Colin Smythe Limited, and the Hedgerow Press.

In 1976, Saddlemyer was elected a fellow of the Royal Society of Canada, and in 1987 a fellow of the Royal Society of Arts. She was made an Officer of the Order of Canada in 1995. She has also received the Queen Elizabeth II Golden Jubilee Medal in 2002, the Queen Elizabeth II Diamond Jubilee Medal in 2012, and the M.L. Rosenthal Award from the Yeats Society of New York in 2001. She has been awarded six honorary doctorates from Queen's University in 1977, the University of Victoria in 1989, McGill University in 1989, the University of Windsor in 1990, the University of Toronto in 1999, and Concordia University in Montreal in 2000. She received a Lifetime Achievement Award from the Canadian Association for Theatre Research in 2013. Concordia University established the annual Ann Saddlemyer Lecture in 2008. In 2011, she was elected a member of the Royal Irish Academy.

== Selected publications ==
- The World of W.B. Yeats: Essays in Perspective (1965)
- In Defence of Lady Gregory, Playwright (1966)
- The Letters of John Millington Synge (1968)
- A Selection of Letters from John M. Synge to W.B. Yeats and Lady Gregory (1971)
- Theatre Business, the letters of the first Abbey Theatre Directors (W.B. Yeats, Lady Gregory and J.M. Synge) (1982) ISBN 978-0-271-00309-2
- Lady Gregory Fifty Years After (1987) ISBN 978-0-389-20360-5
- Early Stages: Theatre in Ontario 1800 to 1914 (1990) ISBN 978-1-4875-8672-0
- Later Stages: Essays on Ontario Theatre from World War I to the 1970s (1997) ISBN 978-0-8020-0671-4
- Becoming George: The Life of Mrs. W.B. Yeats (2002) ISBN 978-0-19-811232-7
- Conversations with Our Past: Stories of North Saanich (2006) ISBN 978-0-9781308-0-0
- W.B. Yeats and George Yeats: The Letters (2011) ISBN 978-0-19-818438-6

== Personal life ==
Saddlemyer was a friend of the Irish poet, Seamus Heaney. When she learnt he was considering becoming a full-time writer, she offered him the rental of her cottage in County Wicklow, Glanmore Cottage. The Heaney family lived there, eventually buying the cottage from Saddlemyer in 1988. They remained close friends until his death in 2013.
