= Irmgard Vilsmaier =

German operatic soprano

Irmgard Vilsmaier (born 4 April 1970) is a German operatic soprano.

== Life ==
Vilsmaier was born in Frontenhausen, Lower Bavaria. After attending secondary school in her home-town, Vilsmaier completed her studies at the Hochschule für Musik Nürnberg with distinction. She then became a member of the opera studio at the Bayerische Staatsoper Munich and later became an ensemble member at the Tiroler Landestheater Innsbruck under the direction of Brigitte Fassbaender. Since 2001, she has been freelancing.

Vilsmaier has sung at various opera houses in Europe and overseas and participated in several festivals. In the process, she worked with renowned conductors and well-known directors. She has sung at the Royal Opera House in London, the Vienna State Opera, the Bavarian State Opera in Munich, the Opéra Bastille Paris, the Gran Teatre del Liceu in Barcelona, the Estonian National Opera in Tallinn, the Hungarian State Opera House in Budapest, the Seattle Opera, the Canadian Opera Company in Toronto, the Semperoper in Dresden, the Nationaltheater Mannheim and the Deutsches Nationaltheater und Staatskapelle Weimar, the Hamburgische Staatsoper and Staatstheater Stuttgart, the Concertgebouw in Amsterdam, the Vlaamse Opera in Antwerp and Ghent, the Volksoper Wien, the Staatsoper Unter den Linden and the Komische Oper Berlin, the Festspielhaus Baden-Baden and the Theater Trier. The singer has performed at the Salzburg Festival, the Glyndebourne Festival Opera, the Reinsberg Festival in Austria and from 2000 to 2004 at the Bayreuth Festival.

== Repertoire ==
- Die Primadonna in Venus und Adonis (Hans Werner Henze)
- Gertrud, Mutter in Hänsel und Gretel (Engelbert Humperdinck)
- Santuzza, eine junge Bäuerin in Cavalleria rusticana (Pietro Mascagni)
- Mutter Maria Theresa vom hl. Augustin in Dialogues des Carmélites (Francis Poulenc (German and French)
- Fata Morgana, Zauberin in The Love for Three Oranges (Sergei Prokofiev)
- Goneril, Tochter König Lears in Lear (Aribert Reimann)
- Herodias in Salome (Richard Straus)
- Chrysothemis in Elektra (Richard Strauss)
- Brünnhilde in Götterdämmerung and Die Walküre (Richard Wagner)
- Gutrune in Götterdämmerung (Richard Wagner)
- Isolde in Tristan und Isolde (Richard Wagner)
- Brangäne in Tristan und Isolde (Richard Wagner)
- Sieglinde in Die Walküre (Richard Wagner)
- Kundry in Parsifal (Richard Wagner)
- Venus in Tannhäuser (Richard Wagner)
- Ortrud in Lohengrin (Richard Wagner)
- Ghita, Lieblingszofe von Donna Clara in Der Zwerg (Alexander Zemlinsky)
