= Felix Lederer =

Czech musician and conductor

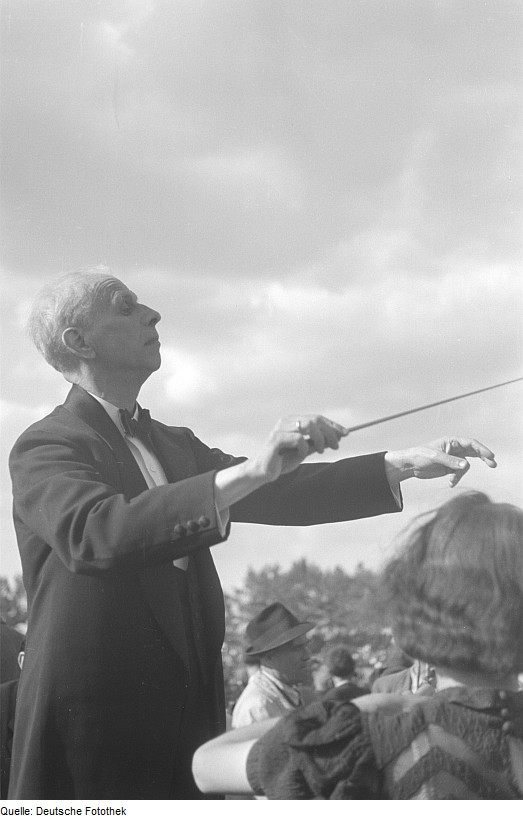
Felix Lederer conducting at the first Memorial Day for the Victims of Fascism, 9 Sep 1945 in Neukölln, Berlin

Felix Lederer (25 February 1877 – 26 March 1957) was a Czech musician and conductor.

== Career ==
As a student, Lederer studied at the Prague Conservatory, where he was in a student of Antonín Dvořák, and at the Gesellschaft der Musikfreunde (Society of Music Friends). His professional career started in 1897 when he was engaged as a répétiteur by the Stadttheater in Breslau. Lederer held the post until 1899 when, during the fall, he took the post of second conductor at the Städtischen Bühnen Nürnberg (today the Staatstheater Nürnberg). In 1903 he was engaged as head Kapellmeister of the Stadttheater Augsburg where he stayed for two years.

From 1905 to 1908, Lederer worked in Barmen at the opera house and state theater. From 1908 to 1910, he directed at the state theater of Bremen. He then moved to the National Theatre Mannheim, where he was the general music director of the opera until 1922. During this time he also conducted concerts at the Mannheim Musikverein concerts. In 1922 Lederer moved to Saarbrücken where he remained until 1935, at which time he was banned from performance by the Nazi Reichskulturkammer for being Jewish.

In 1946, Lederer was offered a professorship at the Berlin University of the Arts. There he was a professor of conducting and a director of the opera school until 1952, at which time he devoted all of his energy to conducting. He continued to perform as a successful concert conductor until his death in 1957.
