= Trent Vanegas =

American blogger from Michigan (born 1974)

Trent Vanegas (born 12 July 1974) is an American blogger from Michigan who is best known for his celebrity gossip blog, Pink is the New Blog (PITNB for short), which he launched in 2004.

== Early life and education ==
Vanegas is originally from the Detroit, Michigan area. He attended Wayne State University and graduated from the University of Oklahoma in 1997.

== Career ==
He spent five years as a high school history teacher at the University Liggett School in Grosse Pointe Woods, Michigan before starting the blog.

=== Pink is the New Blog ===
Pink is the New Blog started in June 2004. Vanegas started the blog for the purpose of getting into the habit of writing every day.

The website focuses on celebrity gossip (often assigning his own monikers), including Britney Spears, Kevin Federline, Lindsay Lohan, Hilary Duff, Paris Hilton, Nicole Richie, and Jake Gyllenhaal, as well as Vanegas' own daily adventures and exploits. The website's signature is in the large block pink letters that are used to add comments to paparazzi photos. Some celebrities like John Mayer have copied the idea to give props to Vanegas and his site by using the large pink blocks in the pictures they take themselves. Vanegas also has pictures of himself with celebrities and celebrities with their pinkisthenewblog.com stickers.

The blog has been published via blogger since its inception, and its host URL Blogspot.

In 2005, PITNB had less than 200 hits per day according to a February 2006 New York Magazine article. However, a November 2005 New York Times article said the blog was receiving 70,000 visitors per day. In 2006, PITNB was reported to have 200,000 hits per month.

In 2008, the site moved to WordPress and was relaunched with a new layout. In November 2011, PITNB received over 1 million unique hits per week.

== Personal life ==
Vanegas currently resides in Los Angeles, California.
