= Berliner Kammeroper =

Berlin opera house

The Berliner Kammeroper was a Berlin opera company with changing venues, founded in 1981 by Henry Akina and Brynmor Jones.

Around seventy works of music theatre, mostly rarely or previously unperformed, from various genres were developed, including proper chamber opera as well as pre-classical opera and contemporary repertoire. Since 2004, the Berliner Kammeroper has concentrated on the development of contemporary chamber operas and world premieres. All productions were Berlin premieres. Many productions were developed as domestic and foreign co-productions or went on tour.

From 1996 to 2002 Brynmor Jones was artistic director and from 2002 to 2012 the artistic direction was held by Kay Kuntze. In 2012/13, the management team consisted of Katharina Tarján (dramaturgy/public relations) and Karin Lindner (production management). In 2013, the performances were discontinued.

The productions were shown in various Berlin venues, including the Konzerthaus Berlin, the Admiralspalast, the Saalbau Neukölln, the former Schaubühne am Halleschen Ufer, the Hansa-Theater and predominantly the Hebbel-Theater.
