= The Ballad of Cable Hogue =

1970 film directed by Sam Peckinpah

- Theatrical release poster
- Directed by: Sam Peckinpah
- Written by: John Crawford; Edmund Penney
- Produced by: Sam Peckinpah
- Starring: Jason Robards; Stella Stevens; David Warner
- Cinematography: Lucien Ballard
- Edited by: Frank Santillo; Lou Lombardo
- Music by: Jerry Goldsmith
- Production company: Phil Feldman Productions
- Distributed by: Warner Bros.
- Release date: March 18, 1970 (Los Angeles)
- Running time: 121 minutes
- Country: United States
- Language: English
- Budget: $3,716,946
- Box office: $2,445,863 (by 1973)

The Ballad of Cable Hogue is a 1970 American Western comedy film directed and produced by Sam Peckinpah, and starring Jason Robards, Stella Stevens and David Warner. Set in the Arizona desert during a period when the frontier was closing, the film follows three years in the life of a failed prospector (Robards).

While unmistakably a Western, the movie is unconventional for the genre and for the director. It contains only a few brief scenes of violence and gunplay, relying more on a subtly crafted story that could better be characterized as comedic in nature.

The film was released by Warner Bros. on March 18, 1970. It was a critical and commercial disappointment on initial release, but has since undergone a reevaluation. Peckinpah himself considered it one of his favorites of his own works.

== Plot ==
Sometime around 1905, Cable Hogue is in the Arizona desert awaiting his partners, Taggart and Bowen, who are scouting for water. The two plot to seize what little water remains to save themselves. Cable, who hesitates to defend himself, is disarmed and abandoned to almost certain death. Confronted with sandstorms and other desert elements, Cable bargains with God. Four days later, about to perish, he stumbles upon a muddy pit. He digs and discovers an abundant supply of water.

After discovering that his well is the only source of water between two towns on a stagecoach route, he decides to live there and build a business. Cable's first paying customer is the Rev. Joshua Duncan Sloane, a wandering minister of a church of his own revelation. Joshua doubts the legitimacy of Cable's claim to the spring, prompting Cable to race into the town of Dead Dog to file at the land office.

Cable faces the mockery of everyone he tells about his discovery. That does not deter him from buying 2 acres (0.8 ha) surrounding his spring. He immediately goes to the stage office to drum up business but is thrown out by the skeptical owner. He pitches his business plan to a bank president, who is dubious about the claim. Cable impresses the banker with his attitude and he is staked to $100.

Cable, who hasn't bathed since his desert wanderings, decides to treat himself to a night with Hildy, a prostitute in the town saloon. They quickly develop a jovial understanding but before they can consummate the transaction, Cable remembers that he has still not set up his boundary markers and rushes out, much to Hildy's chagrin. She chases him out of the saloon in a sequence that wreaks havoc on the town.

Back at the spring, Cable and Joshua get to work, dubbing the claim Cable Springs. The two decide to go into town and are drunk by the time they arrive. Cable makes up with Hildy and spends the night with her, leaving Joshua to pursue his passion: the seduction of emotionally vulnerable women.

Cable and Joshua continue to run the robust business, delighting in shocking the often genteel travelers with the realities of frontier life. In moments of solitude, Cable and Joshua philosophize on the nature of love and the passing of their era. Joshua decides that he must return to town. Hildy arrives at Cable Springs having been "asked" to leave by the modernizing townfolk, who can no longer abide open prostitution in their midst. She tells Cable that she will leave for San Francisco in the morning but winds up staying with him for three weeks. This time elapses during a tender, romantic montage.

Joshua eventually wanders back to Cable Springs, having gotten into trouble with a married woman in Dead Dog, but leaves a few days after Hildy decides to continue on to San Francisco. Cable continues to run his establishment alone.

One day, Taggart and Bowen arrive on the stagecoach. Cable lets them believe that he bears them no ill will, and he alludes to a huge stash of cash that he has hoarded, knowing that the two men will return to steal it. When they do, Cable outwits them by throwing rattlesnakes into the pit they have dug. When they surrender, he orders them to strip to their underwear to venture into the desert, just as he had been forced to do. Taggart, believing Cable will once again hesitate to defend himself, reaches for his gun but Hogue shoots him dead. A motor car appears, driving right past Cable Springs with no need or interest in stopping for water. The drivers laugh at the archaic scene of western violence as they race past. "Went right on by," says Cable in amazement. "Well, that's gonna be the next fella's worry."

Cable takes mercy on the grovelling Bowen and gives him Cable Springs, having decided to go to San Francisco to find Hildy. The stagecoach arrives and Cable gets ready to pack up when suddenly another motorcar appears. This one does stop and Hildy emerges, opulently dressed. She has become prosperous (by marrying a rich man who "died in bed of a stroke") and, now on her way to New Orleans, has come to see if Cable is ready to join her. He agrees but while he loads the motorcar he accidentally trips its brake. The car runs over him as he pushes Bowen out of the way.

Joshua, who arrives by a black motorcycle with a sidecar, gives a eulogy for Cable as he dies. This segues into a funeral with the cast standing mournfully over Cable's grave. They are grieving not only the death of the man but the era he represents. The stagecoach and motorcar drive off in opposite directions. A coyote wanders into the abandoned Cable Springs. The coyote has a collar – possibly symbolising the taming of the wilderness.

== Cast ==
- Jason Robards as Cable Hogue
- Stella Stevens as Hildy
- David Warner as Rev. Joshua Duncan Sloan
- Strother Martin as Bowen
- Slim Pickens as Ben Fairchild
- L. Q. Jones as Taggart
- Peter Whitney as Cushing
- R. G. Armstrong as Quittner
- Gene Evans as Clete
- William Mims as Jensen
- Kathleen Freeman as Mrs. Jensen
- Susan O'Connell as Claudia
- Vaughn Taylor as Powell
- Max Evans as Webb Seely
- James Anderson as Preacher
- Felix Nelson as William
- Darwin Lamb as The Stranger
- Mary Munday as Dot
- William D. Faralla as Lucius
- Matthew Peckinpah as Matthew
- Easy Pickens as "Easy"

== Production ==
Sam Peckinpah followed his violent, critically acclaimed 1969 film The Wild Bunch with this mostly non-violent Western. Using many of the same cast (L.Q. Jones, Strother Martin) and crew members of The Wild Bunch, Peckinpah shot on location in the desert of Nevada and Apacheland Movie Ranch located in Apache Junction, Arizona. The film was originally budgeted at $880,000. Principal photography occurred concurrently with post-production on The Wild Bunch, with Peckinpah shooting for six days a week on Cable Hogue and editing The Wild Bunch on Sunday.

The production was plagued by poor weather, Peckinpah's renewed alcohol consumption and his brusque firing of 36 crew members. When unable to shoot due to weather conditions, the cast and crew would go to a local bar, eventually running up a tab of $70,000. The chaotic filming wrapped 19 days over schedule and $3 million over budget, terminating his tenure with Warner Bros.-Seven Arts. In retrospect, it was a damaging career move. The critical and box office hits Deliverance (1972) and Jeremiah Johnson (1972) were in development at the time and Peckinpah was considered the first choice to direct them. His alienation of Warner Brothers left him with a limited number of directing jobs. Peckinpah was forced to do a 180-degree turn from The Ballad of Cable Hogue and traveled to England to direct Straw Dogs (1971), one of his darkest and most psychologically disturbing films.

== Reception ==
=== Critical response ===
On Rotten Tomatoes the film has an approval rating of 94% based on reviews from 16 critics. Roger Ebert of the Chicago Sun-Times gave the film three-and-a-half stars out of four and called it "a splendid example of the New Western. It's also a fine movie, a wonderfully comic tale we didn't quite expect from a director who seems more at home with violence than with humor." Roger Greenspun of The New York Times called it "Peckinpah's gentlest, boldest, and perhaps most likable film to date. It is also thematically his most ambitious." Gene Siskel of the Chicago Tribune gave the film three stars out of four and wrote that there were "many things to cherish in 'Cable Hogue,' especially Jason Robards' flawless performance. Robards is able to be both as tough and as compassionate as his character." Siskel's main complaints was during the second act when "one of two things happened. Either my needs require a quicker-moving film or gunplay, or Peckinpah did not have enough of a story."

Arthur D. Murphy of Variety called it "a Damon Runyon-esque oater" that was "[l]oaded with bawdy, lusty and gritty elements, plus genuine tenderness and feeling, as well as too much length ... This is a notable, but not substantial, flaw in an otherwise excellent film." Charles Champlin of the Los Angeles Times stated that the film "gets away to a shocking and immensely cinematic start. The trail, I'm afraid, winds down from there, but even at his most heavy-handed, simplistic and protracted, Peckinpah remains just about the most genuinely individualistic American director of his generation." Gary Arnold of The Washington Post called it "a mood piece in which the right mood—a laconic fairy tale, rather like William Wyler's 'The Westerner' with Gary Cooper and Walter Brennan—is only fitfully achieved and sustained. There are nice moments, nice feelings, but the film has a jerky rhythm and uneven tone. It feels rather absent-minded, as if Peckinpah were distracted during the shooting (as indeed, he was—by editing 'The Wild Bunch') and never found a consistent style for this material."

Largely ignored upon its release, The Ballad of Cable Hogue has been rediscovered and is often held by critics as an example of the breadth of Peckinpah's talent. They claim that the film proves Peckinpah's ability to make unconventional and original work without resorting to explicit violence. Over the years, Peckinpah cited the film as a favorite. All the town scenes were filmed on location at Apacheland Movie Ranch in Apache Junction, Arizona. The desert scenes at Cable Springs and elsewhere were filmed in Nevada at Valley of Fire State Park.

Critics have called The Ballad of Cable Hogue a "Death of the West" film, depicting the transition from old to modern civilization. Other films of this category include Once Upon a Time in the West (1968), Paint Your Wagon (1969), Monte Walsh (1970), McCabe & Mrs. Miller (1971), The Life and Times of Judge Roy Bean (1972), The Shootist (1976), Unforgiven (1992) and Peckinpah's Ride the High Country (1962), The Wild Bunch (1969) and Pat Garrett and Billy the Kid (1973).

== Soundtrack ==
The Ballad of Cable Hogue has an original score by Jerry Goldsmith and songs by singer-songwriter Richard Gillis, whom Peckinpah supposedly hired after hearing him sing in a local bar. Each of the main characters has a theme: Hogue's "Tomorrow is the Song I Sing", Hildy's "Butterfly Mornin's", and Joshua's "Wait for Me, Sunrise". The soundtrack was eventually released in 2001 by Varèse Sarabande, in a limited edition album of 3000 copies.

== In popular culture ==
Welsh musician John Cale wrote and recorded a song titled "Cable Hogue" for his 1975 album Helen of Troy.

Tucson band Calexico wrote a song called "Ballad Of Cable Hogue" on their 2000 album Hot Rail, which shares similar lyrical themes to the plot of the film.

The 2007 bootleg album Cable Hogue Soundtrack, by the Japanese band Les Rallizes Dénudés, has no connection to the movie or its soundtrack.

Cable Hogue is the name chosen by the super-intelligent artificial intelligence that is a moon-sized star ship in Neal Asher's Polity series of books.

== See also ==
- List of American films of 1970

== Notes ==
- Weddle, David (1994). If they move-- kill 'em! : the life and times of Sam Peckinpah. Grove Press.
