= Major Dundee =

1965 film by Sam Peckinpah

- Theatrical release poster
- Directed by: Sam Peckinpah
- Screenplay by: Harry Julian Fink; Oscar Saul; Sam Peckinpah
- Story by: Harry Julian Fink
- Produced by: Jerry Bresler
- Starring: Charlton Heston; Richard Harris; Jim Hutton; James Coburn; Michael Anderson Jr.; Mario Adorf; Brock Peters; Senta Berger
- Cinematography: Sam Leavitt
- Edited by: Howard Kunin; William A. Lyon; Donald W. Starling
- Music by: Daniele Amfitheatrof (theatrical cut); Christopher Caliendo (restored cut)
- Production company: Jerry Bresler Productions
- Distributed by: Columbia Pictures
- Release date: March 16, 1965
- Running time: 123 minutes (theatrical cut); 136 minutes (restored cut)
- Country: United States
- Language: English
- Budget: $4 million or $4.5 million
- Box office: $2.5 million (rentals)

Major Dundee is a 1965 American Western film directed by Sam Peckinpah, from a screenplay he co-wrote with Harry Julian Fink and Oscar Saul. It stars Charlton Heston, Richard Harris, Jim Hutton, James Coburn, Michael Anderson Jr., Mario Adorf, Brock Peters, and Senta Berger. The film is about a Union cavalry officer who leads a contentious troop of Army regulars, Confederate prisoners, and Indian scouts on an expedition into Mexico during the American Civil War to destroy a band of Apaches who have been raiding United States bases and settlements in the New Mexico territory.

The film was shot in various locations in Mexico, filmed in Eastman Color by Pathécolor, print by Technicolor. Major Dundee became notorious for its difficult shoot and post production, which saw the movie greatly cut from Peckinpah's original vision. He later called the film "one of the most painful things that ever happened in my life."

The film was released by Columbia Pictures on March 16, 1965. Initial critical response was largely negative, but retrospective reviews have been highly positive, following the release of an extended cut closer to Peckinpah's original vision in 2005.

== Plot ==
During the American Civil War, Union cavalry officer Major Amos Dundee is relieved of his command for a tactical error at the Battle of Gettysburg and sent to head a prisoner-of-war camp in the New Mexico Territory. After a family of ranchers and a relief column of cavalry are massacred by Apache war chief Sierra Charriba, Dundee sends his scout Samuel Potts to locate Charriba and begins raising his own, unauthorized force. He attempts to recruit Confederate prisoners led by his former friend, Captain Ben Tyreen. Tyreen bears a grudge against Dundee and refuses his request. Before the war, Dundee had cast the deciding vote in Tyreen's court-martial from the United States Army for participating in a duel, leading to Tyreen's dismissal. Dundee is a Southerner, but fought for the Union.

Dundee's recruits include bugler Tim Ryan, the only survivor of the massacre (and the film's narrator), as well as a horse thief, a drunken mule-packer, a vengeful minister, and a small group of black soldiers who are tired of doing menial tasks. Dundee reluctantly appoints the inexperienced Lieutenant Graham as his second-in-command. Eventually, facing a hanging which may or may not be a bluff on Dundee's part, Tyreen binds himself and 20 of his men to loyally serve Dundee, but only until Charriba is "taken or destroyed".

When the diverse factions of Dundee's force are not fighting each other, they engage the Apaches in several bloody battles. Though they rescue several young children captured by the Apaches, Dundee's men lose most of their supplies in an ambush, forcing them to raid a village garrisoned by French troops supporting Emperor Maximilian. However, little remains to be looted, and Dundee ends up sharing some of his dwindling food with the starving Mexicans. Beautiful resident Teresa Santiago, the Austrian widow of a doctor executed for his support of the rebels under Benito Juárez, causes further tensions between Dundee and Tyreen, as they compete for her attentions. Dundee makes escaping easy for his French prisoners. When they return with reinforcements, Dundee surprises the French column and makes off with badly needed supplies. After this success, the men begin to get along. However, one of the Confederates, O. W. Hadley, attempts to desert. Dundee orders his execution, but Tyreen shoots Hadley himself to quell any resentment from his men.

Teresa and Dundee have a brief affair. In an unguarded moment, he is attacked by the Apaches and wounded in the leg, forcing him to seek medical help in French-held Durango. The doctor removes the arrow, but Dundee has to remain to recuperate. He is tended by a pretty Mexican, whom he eventually takes to bed. When Teresa comes upon them, her relationship with Dundee comes to an abrupt end. Dundee starts drinking heavily. Graham leads a small group of men to distract the French, while Tyreen shames Dundee into resuming his mission. Dundee has no hope of catching the Apaches, so he pretends to give up and starts back for the United States. The Apaches give chase and fall into Dundee's trap. Ryan kills Charriba in the ambush.

Dundee and Tyreen prepare to resume their private vendetta, but the French appear. They position a portion of their force on the American side of the Rio Grande. Two other columns come up fast south of the river. The Americans and the northern French contingent charge each other, fighting in the river. Tyreen sees a French soldier seize the regimental colors. He takes back the flag and hands it over to Dundee. Shot in the stomach, Tyreen singlehandedly charges the French cavalry, enabling the others to cross the Rio Grande. Only Yankees Dundee, Graham, Potts, Ryan, and Sergeant Gomez, plus Confederates Chillum and Benteen and a few others survive.

As Dundee's force heads home, the narration notes that it is now April 19, 1865. The soldiers are unaware that Lee has surrendered, the Civil War is over, and Abraham Lincoln has been assassinated.

== Cast ==
- Charlton Heston as Maj. Amos Charles Dundee
- Richard Harris as Cpt. Benjamin Tyreen
- Jim Hutton as Lt. Graham
- James Coburn as Samuel Potts
- Michael Anderson Jr. as Tim Ryan
- Senta Berger as Teresa Santiago
- Mario Adorf as Sgt. Gomez
- Brock Peters as Aesop
- Warren Oates as O.W. Hadley
- Ben Johnson as Sgt. Chillum
- R. G. Armstrong as Reverend Dahlstrom
- L. Q. Jones as Arthur Hadley
- Slim Pickens as Wiley
- Karl Swenson as Cpt. Waller
- Michael Pate as Sierra Charriba
- John Davis Chandler as Jimmy Lee Benteen
- Dub Taylor as Priam
- Begoña Palacios as Linda
- Aurora Clavel as Melinche
- Albert Carrier as Cpt. Jacques Tremaine
- José Carlos Ruiz as Riago
- Aurora Clavel as Melinche
- Enrique Lucero as Dr. Aguilar
- Francisco Reiguera as Elder Apache

Uncredited

- Rockne Tarkington as Jefferson
- Jody McCrea as Branin
- Hal Needham as Jurgenson
- Marvin Miller as Narrator (voice)

Credits from the AFI Catalog of Feature Films.

== Production ==
=== Screenplay ===
The script was based on an extended treatment by Fink called And Then Came Tiger. This was read by producer Jerry Bresler, who had made a number of successful films for Columbia Studios including Diamond Head starring Charlton Heston. The studio had a commitment with Heston to make another film, and Bresler showed the actor the material in June 1963. Heston was interested, as he wanted to make a film that explored the Civil War, "a real film; not a film about the 'Gallant Grey Ghosts of the Confederacy', you know."

Bresler thought Sam Peckinpah might be an ideal director for the material. He showed Heston Ride the High Country (1962), Peckinpah's latest movie. Heston admired it, writing in his diary, "He's made a damn good Western, for almost nothing, though MGM blew it in release. I'd like to work for him." Peckinpah agreed to direct Major Dundee for a fee of $50,000.

Actor R. G. Armstrong, who had a small part as a reverend who tags along with the expedition, referred to the 156-minute version of the film as "Moby-Dick on horseback".

While Fink wrote a draft, Peckinpah scouted locations in Mexico. Filming was to begin in December 1963, but when the director read Fink's script in September, he was dissatisfied with it. Bresler agreed to push filming back until February, the latest they could move it before Heston started work on The Agony and the Ecstasy. He then arranged for Oscar Saul to work on the script with Peckinpah.

Heston was sent a full script in November. He wrote in his diaries, "There's a lot of good work in it, but I'm more than a little disappointed. The characters are there, and the bones of the story, but there's a lot of excess mishmash."

Peckinpah rewrote the script, but at the start of filming, Heston reflected, "There are holes in it; serious holes, I think. That means either he [Peckinpah] knows a lot less about scripts than I do ... or a lot more. I'm perfectly willing to accept the latter premise, but it's a bit spooky just now. The main thing wrong is the girl's part, which is very sloppily written."

Heston later recalled the main lesson he learned from Major Dundee was to "never, never, never start shooting without a complete script... it was a major stumbling block on Dundee". Heston said part of this "was the fault of a very inadequate writer who was on at first and worked for six months without really producing anything remotely shootable, forcing the studio into what finally became a five-month postponement." According to Heston, the studio asked Peckinpah to rewrite it, but "we still weren't really ready when the second shooting date came up. Also, it may be that we all had different films in mind: the studio, Sam, and me."

=== Casting ===
Richard Harris had recently starred in the British art-house success This Sporting Life, and Heston and Peckinpah were discussing him as a possible second lead as early as July 1963. In November, though, Heston wrote that Anthony Quinn had turned down the role and the studio was going to offer it to Steve McQueen. He also wrote that they hoped for Lee Marvin to play Potts and Omar Sharif to play Gomez. Harris was cast in December. The actor selected Dundee over a British project, The Luck of Ginger Coffey because the Hollywood film paid more, a decision he never regretted.

The film was the first of several Coburn made with Sam Peckinah. It was Jim Hutton's first film made outside MGM since becoming a star.

=== Filming ===
Filming started in February 1964 and took place in Mexico. According to Peckinpah, just prior to filmmaking, the new management at the studio (Mike Frankovitch replacing Sol Schwartz as head of production) cut the budget from $4.5 million to $3 million and removed 15 days from the schedule.

The production of the movie was very troubled. Peckinpah was often drunk on the set, and was supposedly so abusive towards the cast that Heston had to threaten him with a cavalry saber to calm him down; he even charged Peckinpah on horseback at one point, leading the director to panic and order the camera crane he was working on to be raised fast.

Peckinpah also fired a large number of crew members for very trivial reasons throughout the shoot. Columbia studio executives feared that the project was out of control, and that Peckinpah was too unstable to finish the picture, so they cut the shooting schedule of the film by several weeks.

Harris and Heston clashed during filming. Harris collapsed during the shoot, in part because of his heavy drinking. Heston wrote in his diary that Harris "does seem to be one of those people who enjoys ill health. In any event, on this picture, he was from time to time spectacularly taken with a seizure of one kind or another." He also called Harris "something of a fuck-up, no question" for making mistakes during the film, although Heston later called himself "unfair" for making such judgements. "It was a grueling location, and Dick [Harris] wasn't used to working with either horses or guns," wrote Heston. "If he was a fuck-up, I was a hard-nosed son of a bitch."

Heston recalled, "As the schedule neared its end, more and more pressure began to be exerted from the studio to curtail the shooting in some way — to eliminate this or that; to somehow cut down the mounting overages."

Heston was worried Peckinpah would be fired and lobbied the studio in support of his director. Heston called Columbia's studio head, Mike Frankovich, and offered to give up his entire salary for the film to keep Peckinpah on the project. The studio staff originally refused, but changed their minds and took Heston's money.

Filming finished on 30 April 1965. The movie went $1.5 million over budget, which meant it cost as much as originally budgeted. Heston wrote shortly afterwards, "I get the feeling Bresler would almost be willing to have the film fail, if only to justify his misgivings about Sam."

=== Post-production ===
The length of Peckinpah's original cut has been disputed. According to some sources, including the 2005 DVD commentary, the original cut was 4 hours 38 minutes long, which was initially edited down to 156 minutes. Included in the unseen longer cuts were several slow-motion battle scenes inspired by Akira Kurosawa's Seven Samurai (1954). The movie was also fairly gory for the standards of 1965, and more bloody and violent scenes were cut out. A bombastic musical score by Daniele Amfitheatrof was added to the film despite Peckinpah's protests, as was the title song, "The Major Dundee March", sung by Mitch Miller and his Sing-Along Gang. (Note: The title song, "The Major Dundee March", became a major hit at the time, but has since gained a negative reputation over the years.) One of the most bizarre parts of the score was the use of an electronically altered sound – three anvils of different lengths played back at half speed every time Charriba or the Apaches would be seen or even mentioned; "Until the Apache is taken or destroyed" was one of the film's catch phrases.

Heston saw a cut of the film in September. He wrote, "[it was] neither as bad as I feared (talking to Sam), nor as good as I hoped (working with Sam). The people are believable, the dialogue good, as are all the performances (yes, I think all). The opening, cutting the one we shot at such cost, doesn't work for me. Most of the rest of the film does, but the whole thing is somehow diffuse. The story is as it always was, too complicated. It may work though... you never know."

In February 1965, Heston saw a release cut and wrote, "it seemed not quite good enough to be a success as a serious film, and probably has too many subtleties, too much footage devoted to character, to succeed as an action film. There are excellent things in it; I think I'm good, but we didn't make it with this one."

Heston later observed, "I'm not persuaded that even if Sam had had total control over the cutting of the final print that he could have had a film that would have pleased him — or me — but I think we would have had something a little better than what we have."

== Themes ==
The screenplay, by Harry Julian Fink, Oscar Saul, and Peckinpah, was loosely based on historical precedents. However, contrary to claims by the production team at the time, it was not actually based on a true story. The film's novelization was written by Richard Wormser. During the Minnesota Dakota War of 1862, Union forces in that state were forced to recruit Confederate prisoners from Texas to make up for their meager numbers in fighting the Indians. Unlike the movie, where much animosity exists between the Union and Confederate troops in Dundee's command, the rebels, called "Galvanized Yankees", fought well and without much complaint. Both Union and Confederate forces also battled Apache, Navajo, and Comanche Indians throughout the war along the U.S.-Mexico border, making the scenario of the movie at least somewhat plausible. Before the film's production, Peckinpah had been working on a Custer project, based on the novel by Hoffman Birney The Dice of God, but later abandoned it for this film. (His screenplay was filmed by Arnold Laven, as The Glory Guys).

Critics of the film have also pointed out similarities between this and Herman Melville's classic novel Moby-Dick. Many of the characters are similar to those from that book, with Dundee as Captain Ahab, Tyreen as Starbuck, Ryan as Ishmael, and other minor characters, with Sierra Charriba and his Apache tribe substituting for the whale, as is the general plot line (an obsessive idealist drives himself to destruction, disregarding the effects on others). These references to Moby-Dick were likely intentional on the part of the screenwriters. Some have also pointed out similarities of the plot to the Vietnam War, which are highly unlikely to have been intentional, as the war had not significantly escalated at the time of the film's production.

The opening scene at the Rostes Ranch and the funeral after the first skirmish with the Indians were inspired by scenes from The Searchers, while the scene in which Dundee's troop exits Fort Benlin, each faction of the command singing its own distinct song, is a deliberate parody of an equivalent scene in Fort Apache. The characterization of Dundee, particularly his personality as a martinet and his relationship with Tyreen, has been related to John Wayne's character in Howard Hawks' Red River. The Mexican Civil War setting recalls Robert Aldrich's Vera Cruz. The film also includes several references to David Lean's Lawrence of Arabia – the execution of Hadley, and Dundee's drunken exile in Durango, closely mirror sequences from this film.

The film "seems a direct reaction to [John] Ford's Fort Apache ... with Charlton Heston cast as a more psychotic, more bluntly careerist version of Ford's Lt. Col. Owen Thursday (Henry Fonda)," according to a New York Times review of the film at the time of the 2013 Blu-ray release. Reviewer Dave Kehr went on to write that Peckinpah "plays Heston's square-jawed intransigence against the aristocratic refinement of a Southern officer (overplayed by ... Harris)" and that Peckinpah "would essentially reshape this material into The Wild Bunch four years later, wisely dividing Dundee's divided character into two separate figures" played then by Robert Ryan and William Holden.

== Release ==
The film's disastrous premier was on March 16, 1965, when its running length had been reduced from 136 to 123 minutes after an additional 13 minutes were cut despite the protests of Peckinpah and producer Jerry Bresler. These extra cuts ruined the movie's scope and created significant plot holes, though the plot holes are known to exist in the extended version. Critics universally panned the film, but many of their criticisms were addressed in the 2005 restored version.

=== Restored version ===
In April 2005, the New York City-based Film Forum premiered an "expanded" version featuring several restored scenes, along with a new musical score by Christopher Caliendo. This expanded version was actually the 136-minute cut authorized by producer Jerry Bresler before he left Columbia Studios. Michael Schlesinger, who became head of Columbia's Repertory Division in 1994, asked asset Management head Grover Crisp about putting the picture back together. Although Crisp initially only found soundless picture trims, he agreed to a search. Finally, he located the missing soundtracks in 2004 and a restoration of the film according to Peckinpah's notes was begun. Because cuts were made to the released version at the last minute, Peckinpah's director's cut is highly unlikely to ever be fully restored. In 2005, the restored version of Major Dundee was shown on limited release in selected cities in North America and released on a Region 1 DVD.

Restored scenes are listed below. These include both brief inserts and additions to existing scenes, as well as four major scenes restored to the film.

- Ryan plays "Taps" as soldiers bury the victims of the massacre.
- After Dundee, Potts, and the other Union troopers survey the massacre at the Rostes Ranch, Tyreen and his Confederates attempt to escape through a mountain stream. They are trapped by troops from the fort and Dundee's command. The next scene shows Dundee announcing to the fort's prisoners his need for volunteers. The scene introduces the character of Tyreen, who is only awkwardly introduced in the theatrical version, and provides the reason why his men and he are to hang later in the film (they killed a guard during their escape attempt).
- Tyreen's men refuse to wear the Union jackets provided to them by Dundee.
- Children watch Dundee's expedition leaving Fort Benlin.
- The wrestling match between Potts and the scout Riago is much longer, with Dundee chiding Potts because the artillery bet on him.
- Paco, one of Potts' Indian scouts, is killed by Apaches before the river ambush.
- The fiesta scene in the Mexican village is longer, with Potts leering at a pretty girl, who snubs him (which would have led to the knife fight scene detailed below), and Teresa trying to comfort a crying baby.
- Dundee recovers from his leg wound in Durango, while being tended to by Melinche (Aurora Clavell), eventually falling in love with her.
- Dundee and his officers – Tyreen, Potts, Lt. Graham, and Sgt. Gomez – find an Apache trail marker, and then debate strategy on how to fight Charriba. At the end of the scene, the fate of Apache scout Riago, who had earlier in the film been accused of being an agent of Charriba's by Dundee and others, is revealed. In the restored version, he is found crucified on a tree. In the theatrical version, his character disappeared without a trace.

Available as extras on the DVD are an unfinished knife-fight scene between Potts and Gomez in a Mexican village, a longer version of Teresa and Dundee's interlude at the lake, and several silent outtakes – including a master shot that would have opened the massacre scene at the beginning of the film, showing Lt. Brannin and his men riding past a sheep farmer to the Rostes Ranch.

A new score was composed by Christopher Caliendo for the restored version. This score was composed and recorded with a small studio orchestra to authentically sound the way director Peckinpah might have approved it had he been alive at the time of the film's restoration, and the way the music might have been done in its original 1965 release as opposed to today's larger orchestra-type scores. The new score is regarded by some critics as being better than the original, which was disliked by film experts and featured the title song performed by the Mitch Miller Sing-a-Long Gang, though many concede the new music is far from perfect; for example, criticism arose of Caliendo's decision to leave unscored several sequences which did have music in the original version.

In 2022, Arrow Video released a Blu-ray of the film based on a 4K scan by Sony Pictures. It features both original and new scores as well as several audio commentaries, interviews, and supplements, including a feature-length documentary on the making of the film, entitled "Passion & Poetry: The Dundee Odyssey."

== Reception ==
=== Initial critical response ===
Although modern reappraisals of the film are generally positive, the reviews for its 1965 theatrical release were negative, though they did acknowledge the film's potential. In his review in The New York Times, Eugene Archer wrote that the film had "an interesting cast, a superior visual texture, unexpected bits of character revelation, and a choppy continuity that finally negates its impact." He praised Peckinpah for "seeking a fresh approach to the Western" and acknowledged that the director "displays a fine eye for panoramic vistas." Archer concludes:

Besides Mr. Heston's strong playing, there is good work by Jim Hutton, Mario Adorf and Michael Anderson Jr. as assorted troopers. Action abounds, and the pace is lively. The outdoor vistas are better than the intimate scenes, which are frequently marred by clumsy background processes, but Mr. Peckinpah does have an eye. He has a lot to learn, but his education should be worth paying for.

=== Retrospective reviews ===
Many of the flaws identified by film critics in 1965 were addressed in the 2005 restored version, and film reviews of the DVD are much more positive. In his review in Alt Film Guide, Dan Schneider called Major Dundee "a near-great film that has a checkered history" and "likely the most gritty and realistic Western ever made."

The film holds a present-day 97% approval rating based on 32 reviews (with an average rating of 7.3/10) on the review aggregation website Rotten Tomatoes, with the site's critics consensus declaring the film "a Western-type with big war scenes, shot with bombast typical of Sam Peckinpah". Metacritic, another review aggregator, reports a score of 62/100 based on 12 critics, indicating "generally favorable reviews".

The film is recognized by American Film Institute in the 2008 lists: AFI's 10 Top 10, nominated Western Film.

Major Dundee helped cement Peckinpah's image as a renegade filmmaker, which he would enhance with the conflicts on his later films, such as The Wild Bunch (1969), Straw Dogs (1971), Pat Garrett and Billy the Kid (1973), and Bring Me the Head of Alfredo Garcia (1974). Peckinpah biographer David Weddle, in his 1994 book If They Move ... Kill 'Em! The Life and Times of Sam Peckinpah, argues that Peckinpah is just as much to blame for the final product as Columbia and Jerry Bresler. Since its release on DVD, Dundee has begun to get recognition and notice from the public at large, and not just Western fans.

== See also ==
- List of American films of 1965
