= Frank Santillo =

American film editor (1912–1978)

- Born: October 8, 1912; Dawson, New Mexico
- Died: June 30, 1978 (aged 65); Los Angeles, California, U.S.
- Occupation: Film editor

Frank Santillo (October 8, 1912 – June 30, 1978) was an American film editor who won the Academy Award for Best Film Editing for Grand Prix in 1966. He was an associate of Slavko Vorkapich and Peter Ballbusch at MGM during the 1930s and 1940s and was known for his creative montage work. He was under contract as an editor at MGM from 1956 to 1966. He worked with director Sam Peckinpah on three films, and was interviewed at length about the production of Ride the High Country (1962).

He died in his sleep in Los Angeles.
