= R. G. Armstrong =

American actor (1917–2012)

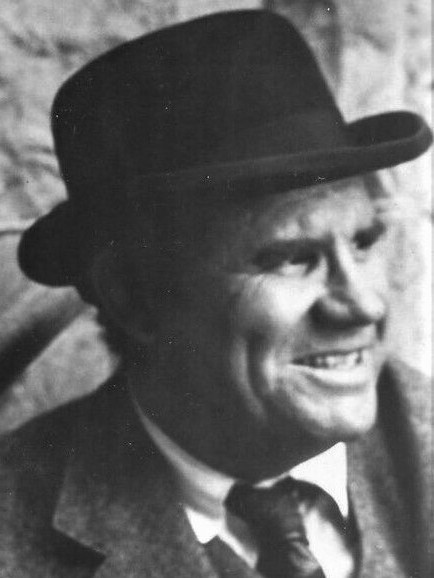
- Armstrong in T.H.E. Cat (1966)
- Born: Robert Golden Armstrong Jr. April 7, 1917; Pleasant Grove, Alabama, U.S.
- Died: July 27, 2012 (aged 95); Studio City, California, U.S.
- Education: Howard College of Samford University; University of North Carolina at Chapel Hill (B.A.); The Actors Studio
- Occupation: Actor
- Years active: 1954–2001
- Spouses: Ann Neale (m. 1952; div. 1972) Susan M. Guthrie (m. 1973; div. 1976) Mary Craven (m. 1993; died 2003)
- Children: 4

Robert Golden Armstrong Jr. (April 7, 1917 – July 27, 2012) was an American character actor and playwright. A veteran performer who appeared in dozens of Westerns during his 40-year career, he may be best remembered for his work with director Sam Peckinpah.

== Early life ==
Armstrong was born in Pleasant Grove, Alabama, and was reared on a small farm near Birmingham. He came from a family of fundamentalist Christians, and his mother wanted him to be a pastor. After graduating from Hueytown High School in 1935, Armstrong initially enrolled at Howard College, now Samford University in Homewood, Alabama, where he became interested in acting, and then transferred to the University of North Carolina (UNC) at Chapel Hill, North Carolina. While there, he began acting on stage with the Carolina Playmakers. Upon graduating, he attended the Actors Studio.

Armstrong wanted to write, rather than act, and said in 1966, "I struggled so hard to be a serious writer." As a student at UNC he wrote a three-act play that was produced. By 1966, he had written "nine full-length plays, four unpublished novels, and 50 unpublished poems."

== Career ==
On Broadway, Armstrong portrayed Dr. Baugh and Big Daddy in Cat on a Hot Tin Roof (1955), Sheriff Talbott in Orpheus Descending (1957), and Captain Keller in The Miracle Worker (1959). He also began writing his own plays, which were performed off-Broadway.

Armstrong's first film appearance was in the 1954 film Garden of Eden; however, it was television where he first earned a name for himself. He guest-starred in virtually every television Western series produced in the 1950s and 1960s, including Have Gun – Will Travel playing Sheriff Jaffey in S1 E28 "Killer's Widow" which aired 3/21/1958, The Californians, Jefferson Drum, The Tall Man, Riverboat, The Rifleman, Zane Grey Theater, Wanted: Dead or Alive, The Westerner, The Big Valley, Bonanza, Maverick (as Louise Fletcher's character's father in the episode which drew the series' largest single viewership, "The Saga of Waco Williams"), Gunsmoke (S7E10 as hard-nosed Union soldier Capt. Benter"), Rawhide, Wagon Train, Lawman, and Bat Masterson.

Armstrong appeared on The Twilight Zone, in the episode "Nothing in the Dark" along with Robert Redford. He appeared in three episodes of Perry Mason, twice in the role of the defendant. In 1958, he appeared in the episode "The Case of the Black-Eyed Blonde" as character Matthew Bartlett. In 1959, he played character Harry Bright in "The Case of the Petulant Partner," then in 1962 he played John Gregory in "The Case of the Stand-in Sister." Armstrong also appeared on Alfred Hitchcock Presents, The Everglades, The Andy Griffith Show, The Fugitive, Daniel Boone, T.H.E. Cat, Hawaii Five-O, Starsky & Hutch, The Dukes of Hazzard, Dynasty, and in the miniseries War and Remembrance. Armstrong had a recurring role in the second season of Millennium as a reclusive visionary known only as the Old Man. In the late 1980s, he played the demonic recurring character "Uncle Lewis Vendredi" in the Canadian horror series Friday the 13th: The Series.

While working on The Westerner in 1960, Armstrong met the up-and-coming writer/director Sam Peckinpah. The two men immediately struck up a friendship. Peckinpah recognized Armstrong's inner turmoil regarding the religious beliefs of his family and utilized that to brilliant effect in his films. Armstrong would almost always play a slightly unhinged fundamentalist Christian in Peckinpah's films, usually wielding a Bible in one hand and a shotgun in the other. This character archetype appeared in Ride the High Country (1962), Major Dundee (1965), and perhaps most memorably in Pat Garrett and Billy the Kid (1973). However, Armstrong also appeared in The Ballad of Cable Hogue (1970), playing a more likeable character.

Even outside Peckinpah's work, Armstrong became a tier-one character actor in his own right, appearing in dozens of films over his career, playing both villains and sympathetic characters. Some of his more memorable roles outside of Peckinpah's films include a sympathetic rancher in El Dorado (1966), Cap'n Dan in The Great White Hope (1970), outlaw Clell Miller in The Great Northfield Minnesota Raid (1972), a bumbling outlaw in My Name is Nobody (1973), a secret Satanic cultist sheriff in Race with the Devil (1975), the drunk wife-beater in The Car (1977), as well as Children of the Corn (1984), Red Headed Stranger (1986) with Willie Nelson, and as General Phillips in Predator (1987). He appeared in several of Warren Beatty's films, including Heaven Can Wait (1978), Reds (1981), and as the character Pruneface in Dick Tracy (1990).

He semi-retired from films and television in the late 1990s, but he continued to be active in off-Broadway theater in New York and Los Angeles, until finally retiring from acting in 2005 because of near-blindness due to cataracts.

In 1991, Armstrong portrayed the title character in the music video for "Enter Sandman" from heavy metal band Metallica, which won the 1992 MTV Video Music award for best metal/hard rock video.

== Personal life and death ==
Armstrong was married three times: his first wife was Ann Neale, with whom he had four children; he was then married to Susan Guthrie until 1976; he was married to his third wife, Mary Craven, until her death in 2003.

Armstrong died of natural causes at the age of 95 on July 27, 2012, at his home in Studio City, California. He was cremated by Neptune Society.

== Selected filmography ==
- Garden of Eden (1954) as J. Randolph Latimore
- Baby Doll (1956) as Townsman Sid (voice, uncredited)
- A Face in the Crowd (1957) as TV Prompter Operator (uncredited)
- From Hell to Texas (1958) as Hunter Boyd
- Never Love a Stranger (1958) as Flix
- No Name on the Bullet (1959) as Asa Canfield
- The Fugitive Kind (1960) as Sheriff Jordan Talbott
- Ten Who Dared (1960) as Oramel Howland
- Ride the High Country (1962) as Joshua Knudsen
- He Rides Tall (1964) as Joshua 'Josh' McCloud
- Major Dundee (1965) as Reverend Dahlstrom
- El Dorado (1966) as Kevin MacDonald
- 80 Steps to Jonah (1969) as Mackray
- Tiger by the Tail (1970) as Ben Holmes
- The Ballad of Cable Hogue (1970) as Quittner
- Angels Die Hard (1970) as Mel
- The McMasters (1970) as Watson
- The Great White Hope (1970) as Cap'n Dan
- J. W. Coop (1971) as Jim Sawyer
- Justin Morgan Had a Horse (1972) as Squire Fisk
- The Final Comedown (1972) as Mr. Freeman
- The Great Northfield, Minnesota Raid (1972) as Clell Miller
- The Legend of Hillbilly John (1972) as Bristowe
- Gentle Savage (1973) as Rupert Beeker, Owner of 'Beeker's Bar'
- Pat Garrett and Billy the Kid (1973) as Ollinger
- White Lightning (1973) as Big Bear
- Running Wild (1973) as Bull
- My Name is Nobody (1973) as Honest John
- Cotter (1973) as Jack
- Boss Nigger (1975) as Mayor Griffin
- Race with the Devil (1975) as Sheriff Taylor
- White Line Fever (1975) as Prosecutor
- Mean Johnny Barrows (1976) as Richard
- Stay Hungry (1976) as Thor Erickson
- Dixie Dynamite (1976) as Charlie White, Bank President
- Mr. Billion (1977) as Sheriff T.C. Bishop
- The Car (1977) as Amos
- The Pack (1977) as Cobb
- Texas Detour (1978) as Sheriff Burt
- Heaven Can Wait (1978) as General Manager
- Devil Dog: The Hound of Hell (1978) as Dunworth
- The Time Machine (1978) as General Harris
- Good Luck, Miss Wyckoff (1979) as Mr. Hemmings
- Fast Charlie... the Moonbeam Rider (1979) as Al Barber
- Steel (1979) as Kellin
- Where the Buffalo Roam (1980) as Judge Simpson
- Evilspeak (1981) as Sarge
- Raggedy Man (1981) as Rigby
- The Pursuit of D.B. Cooper (1981) as Dempsey
- Reds (1981) as Government Agent
- The Beast Within (1982) as Doc Schoonmaker
- Hammett (1982) as Lieutenant O'Mara
- The Shadow Riders (1982) as Sheriff Miles Gillette
- Lone Wolf McQuade (1983) as T. Tyler
- Children of the Corn (1984) as Diehl
- The Best of Times (1986) as Schutte
- Red Headed Stranger (1986) as Sheriff Reese Scoby - Driscoll, Montana
- Jocks (1987) as Coach Bettlebom
- Predator (1987) as General Phillips
- Bulletproof (1988) as Miles Blackburn
- Ghetto Blaster (1989) as Curtis
- Trapper County War (1989) as Pop Luddigger
- Dick Tracy (1990) as Pruneface
- Warlock: The Armageddon (1993) as Franks
- Dead Center (1993) as Art Fencer
- Payback (1995) as Mac
- Invasion of Privacy (1996) as Sam Logan, Storekeeper
- Purgatory (1999) as Coachman
- The Waking (2001) as Edward Sloan (final film role)

== Selected television ==
Year	Title	Role	Notes
1960	Alfred Hitchcock Presents	Captain Bone	Season 6 Episode 13: "The Man Who Found the Money"
1962	The Twilight Zone	Construction Contractor	Season 3 Episode 16: "Nothing in the Dark"
1962	Alfred Hitchcock Presents	Fred Riordan	Season 7 Episode 30: "What Frightened You, Fred?"
1962	Rawhide	Gantry Hobson	Season 5, Episode 6, "Incident of the Lost Woman"
1962	The Alfred Hitchcock Hour	William Downey	Season 1 Episode 6: "Final Vow"
1963	The Alfred Hitchcock Hour	John Cooley	Season 2 Episode 3: "Terror at Northfield"
1965	Gunsmoke	Jed Briar	Season 10 Episode 27: "The Lady"
1966	Bonanza	Col. Keith Jarrell	Season 7 Episode 32: "The Last Mission"
1966-1967	T.H.E. Cat	Captain McAllister	Recurring role
1987-1990	Friday the 13th: The Series	“Uncle Lewis” Vendredi	Recurring role; various episodes
