= Posse (1975 film) =

1975 film by Kirk Douglas

- DVD cover
- Directed by: Kirk Douglas
- Screenplay by: Christopher Knopf; William Roberts
- Based on: The Train; 1971 short story by Larry Cohen; Robert Perham
- Produced by: Kirk Douglas; Phil Feldman
- Starring: Kirk Douglas; Bruce Dern; Bo Hopkins; James Stacy; Luke Askew; David Canary
- Cinematography: Fred J. Koenekamp
- Edited by: John W. Wheeler
- Music by: Maurice Jarre
- Production company: The Bryna Company
- Distributed by: Paramount Pictures
- Release date: June 4, 1975
- Running time: 92 minutes
- Country: United States
- Language: English

Posse is a 1975 American revisionist Western film produced and directed by Kirk Douglas, who also starred. The screenplay was written by Christopher Knopf and William Roberts. The plot centers on a U.S. marshal with political ambitions leading an elite posse in pursuit of a notorious train robber to further his political career. The film premiered in New York City on June 4, 1975, and in June the same year in Berlin at the 25th Berlin International Film Festival, where Douglas was nominated for the Golden Bear.

== Plot ==
Howard Nightingale (Douglas), a U.S. marshal, leads an elite uniformed posse to track down and capture infamous train robber Jack Strawhorn (Bruce Dern). He is doing so to further his political career, as he is running to become a U. S. Senator. When Nightingale captures Strawhorn, his election seems inevitable, but Strawhorn disrupts everything when he escapes, kidnapping Nightingale in the process. He demands a ransom of $40,000 from the posse for Nightingale's safe return—the same amount of money the posse burned when it first tracked Strawhorn down and killed the members of his gang. To raise the money, Nightingale's posse has to rob the town, thus turning the public against Nightingale. The posse members, since they first captured Strawhorn, had been given reason to doubt that their loyalty to Nightingale is reciprocated. It sets up a final confrontation where they have to reassess on whose side they are.

== Cast ==
- Kirk Douglas as Marshal Howard Nightingale
- Bruce Dern as Jack Strawhorn
- Bo Hopkins as Wesley
- James Stacy as Hellman
- Luke Askew as Krag
- David Canary as Pensteman
- Alfonso Arau as Peppe
- Katherine Woodville as Mrs. Cooper
- Mark Roberts as Mr. Cooper
- Beth Brickell as Mrs. Ross
- Dick O'Neill as Wiley
- Bill Burton as McCanless
- Louie Elias as Rains
- Gus Greymountain as Reynolds
- Allan Warnick as The Telegrapher
- Roger Behrstock as Buwalda
- Jess Riggle as Hunsinger
- Stephanie Steele as Amy
- Melody Thomas as Laurie
- Dick Armstrong as Shanty Principal
- Larry Finley as Shanty Principal
- Pat Tobin as Shanty Principal

== See also ==
- List of American films of 1975
