= William Roberts (screenwriter) =

American screenwriter

William S. Roberts (September 4, 1913 – March 5, 1997) was a screenwriter.

His screenplays include: The Mating Game (1959), The Magnificent Seven (1960), The Wonderful World of the Brothers Grimm (1962), Ride the High Country (1962; uncredited), The Bridge at Remagen (1969), Posse (1975).

Roberts was the creator of ABC's sitcom, The Donna Reed Show.

William Roberts died on March 5, 1997, in Los Angeles, California, of respiratory failure.
