= Pat Garrett and Billy the Kid =

1973 film by Sam Peckinpah

- Theatrical release poster
- Directed by: Sam Peckinpah
- Written by: Rudy Wurlitzer
- Produced by: Gordon Carroll
- Starring: James Coburn; Kris Kristofferson; Bob Dylan; Jason Robards
- Cinematography: John Coquillon
- Edited by: Roger Spottiswoode; Garth Craven; Robert L. Wolfe; Richard Halsey; David Berlatsky; Tony de Zarraga
- Music by: Bob Dylan
- Production company: Metro-Goldwyn-Mayer
- Distributed by: Metro-Goldwyn-Mayer
- Release date: May 23, 1973
- Running time: 106 minutes (theatrical cut); 122 minutes (preview cut)
- Country: United States
- Language: English
- Budget: $4.64 million
- Box office: $11 million

Pat Garrett and Billy the Kid is a 1973 American revisionist Western film directed by Sam Peckinpah, written by Rudy Wurlitzer, and starring James Coburn, Kris Kristofferson, Richard Jaeckel, Katy Jurado, Chill Wills, Barry Sullivan, Jason Robards, Slim Pickens and Bob Dylan. The film is about an aging Pat Garrett (Coburn), hired as a lawman by a group of wealthy New Mexico cattle barons to bring down his old friend Billy the Kid (Kristofferson).

Dylan also composed the score and songs for the film, most prominently "Knockin' on Heaven's Door", which were released on its soundtrack album the same year and nominated for a Grammy Award for Album of Best Original Score (Dylan). The movie was filmed on location in Durango, Mexico, and was nominated for two BAFTA Awards for Film Music (Dylan) and Most Promising Newcomer (Kristofferson).

The film was noted for behind-the-scenes battles between Peckinpah and the studio, Metro-Goldwyn-Mayer. Soon after completion, the film was taken away from the director and substantially re-edited, resulting in a truncated version released to theaters and largely disowned by cast and crew members. Peckinpah's preview version (Note: The preview version is sometimes referred to as Peckinpah's "director's cut".) was released on video in 1988, leading to a re-evaluation, with many critics hailing it as a mistreated classic and one of the era's best films. It is ranked 126th on Empire magazine's list of The 500 Greatest Movies of All Time.

== Plot ==
In 1909, (Note: In real life, Pat Garrett was killed in 1908.) near Las Cruces, New Mexico, Pat Garrett is riding with men working for the Santa Fe Ring, when he is ambushed and coldly killed by his associates, including one John W. Poe.

In 1881 in Old Fort Sumner, New Mexico, William H. Bonney, known as Billy the Kid, is passing the time with friends shooting chickens for fun. Garrett, an old friend of Billy's, rides into town with Deputy Sheriff J. W. Bell and joins the diversion. Later, over drinks, Garrett informs Billy that the electorate wants him out of the county, and that in five days, when he becomes Sheriff of Lincoln County, he will make Billy leave.

Six days later, Garrett and his deputies surround the small farmhouse where Billy and his gang are holed up. In the ensuing gun battle, Charlie Bowdre and several other men on both sides are killed, and Billy is taken prisoner. As Billy awaits his execution in the Lincoln County Jail for the killing of Buckshot Roberts, he is taunted and beaten by self-righteous Deputy Sheriff Bob Olinger while the hangman's gallows are being built nearby. Garrett warns Olinger not to taunt Billy again or he will be fired and sent back to Texas; then, Garrett leaves town to collect taxes leaving his two deputies to guard Billy. Olinger again argues with Billy but after J. W. Bell intervenes, Olinger leaves to get a drink. Billy finds a gun hidden for him in the outhouse and shoots Bell in the back. He then retrieves Olinger's shotgun loaded with "sixteen thin dimes" and shoots Olinger dead in the street, saying, "Keep the change, Bob." Billy leaves town.

After Garrett returns to Lincoln and recruits a new deputy sheriff named Alamosa Bill Kermit, he rides to Santa Fe to meet with Governor Lew Wallace, who introduces him to a pair of powerful men from the Santa Fe Ring. They offer a thousand dollars for the capture of Billy the Kid, with five hundred dollars upfront. Garrett rejects the money saying they can pay him in full when Billy is brought in and warns them that he will be successful as long as another cattle war is not started. Meanwhile, Billy returns to his gang at Old Fort Sumner, where he decides to lie back for a few days. He is confronted by three strangers looking to kill him; all three are killed in the subsequent shootout, helped by another stranger called Alias, who kills one of the men with a knife through the neck. Alias had witnessed Billy's escape from the Lincoln County Jail.

Garrett meets up with Sheriff Colin Baker, hoping he can provide information on Billy's whereabouts. Baker and his wife go with Garrett to arrest some of Billy's old gang. In a gunfight, the gang members including Black Harris are killed and Baker is mortally wounded. Baker's wife comforts the dying lawman as he waits to die by a river. Later that evening, Garrett watches a barge floating down a river with a man shooting bottles in the water. The two face off briefly from a distance before lowering their rifles.

Garrett is joined by a glory-seeking John W. Poe, who works for the Santa Fe Ring. The two ride southwest to meet John Chisum, a powerful cattle baron, who informs them that Billy has been rustling his cattle again and killed some of his men; Billy once worked for him and claimed that Chisum owes him $500 of back salary. Anticipating Garrett's arrival in Old Fort Sumner, Billy's friend Paco and his family leave for Mexico, soon followed by Billy. Along the way, Billy stops at the Horrell Trading Post, which is owned by an old friend. By chance, Horrell is hosting Garrett's new deputy, Alamosa Bill. After they finish eating, Billy and Alamosa step outside for a duel at ten paces. Both participants cheat, and the duel ends with Billy shooting Alamosa dead. Meanwhile, Garrett and Poe arrive at a saloon. Garrett tells Poe to ride on without him and that Garrett will pick him up in Roswell in five or six days. Three members of Billy's gang come into the saloon. After taunting Holly and getting him drunk, Garrett shoots him dead after he pulls a knife. He tells Alias to give Billy a message that they had "a little drink together".

Garrett rides to Roswell ahead of Poe to gather more clues on Billy's whereabouts. Garrett beats up a prostitute named Ruthie Lee and learns from her that Billy is in Fort Sumner. Poe arrives in Roswell to find Garrett naked and in bed with several prostitutes, and confirms Billy's location. Garrett recruits an old friend he helped become a sheriff and along with Poe rides to Fort Sumner to find Billy. Later that night Billy and his girlfriend, the daughter of Pete Maxwell, have sex as Garrett and his two deputies arrive. Billy goes to get some meat and, after seeing Garrett's deputies (who are both afraid to shoot the Kid), backs into a bedroom where Garrett shoots him. Garrett angrily hits Poe for attempting to cut off Billy's trigger finger as a trophy. He stays on the porch until morning, when the townspeople of Fort Sumner, having heard the news of his death, gather to see Billy's lifeless body. Garrett mounts his horse and rides out of town while a small boy throws stones at him.

== Cast ==
- James Coburn as Sheriff Pat Garrett
- Kris Kristofferson as Billy the Kid
- Richard Jaeckel as Sheriff Kip McKinney
- Jason Robards as Governor Lew Wallace
- Bob Dylan as Alias
- Rita Coolidge as Maria
- Chill Wills as Lemuel
- Barry Sullivan as John Chisum
- R. G. Armstrong as Deputy Sheriff Bob Olinger
- Luke Askew as Eno
- John Beck as John W. Poe
- Richard Bright as Holly
- Matt Clark as Deputy Sheriff J. W. Bell
- Jack Dodson as Lewellen Howland
- Jack Elam as Alamosa Bill Kermit
- Emilio Fernández as Paco
- Paul Fix as Pete Maxwell
- L. Q. Jones as "Black" Harris
- Slim Pickens as Sheriff Colin Baker
- Jorge Russek as Silva
- Charles Martin Smith as Charlie Bowdre
- Katy Jurado as Mrs. Baker
- Harry Dean Stanton as Luke
- Claudia Bryar as Mrs. Horrell
- John Chandler as Norris
- Michael T. Mikler as Denver
- Aurora Clavel as Ida Garrett
- Rutanya Alda as Ruthie Lee
- Walter Kelley as Rupert
- Rudy Wurlitzer as Tom O'Folliard
- Elisha Cook Jr. as Cody
- Gene Evans as Mr. Horrell
- Verna Bloom as Mrs. Horrell
- Donnie Fritts as "Beaver"
- Dub Taylor as Josh
- Don Levy as Sackett

Uncredited

- Sam Peckinpah as Will
- Bruce Dern as Deputy Sheriff

== Production ==
The screenplay of Pat Garrett and Billy the Kid was written by Rudy Wurlitzer and was originally intended to be directed by Monte Hellman. The two had previously worked together on the acclaimed film Two-Lane Blacktop (1971). Sam Peckinpah became involved through actor James Coburn, who wanted to play the legendary sheriff Pat Garrett.

Peckinpah believed that this was his chance to make a definitive statement on the Western genre and complete the revision that he had begun with Ride the High Country (1962) and The Wild Bunch (1969). Working with Wurlitzer, he rewrote the script to create a more cyclical narrative, and added a prologue and epilogue depicting Garrett's own assassination at the hands of the men who hired him to kill Billy the Kid. In the original script, Pat Garrett and Billy the Kid never met onscreen until the film's conclusion, and Wurlitzer reportedly resented Peckinpah's reworking of the narrative. Wurlitzer and Peckinpah had a strained relationship, and Wurlitzer would later write a book highly unfavorable to Peckinpah.

Peckinpah initially considered Bo Hopkins for the part of Billy, but he eventually cast country music star Kris Kristofferson as the outlaw. Kristofferson was 36 when the film was made, playing 21-year-old Billy. Kristofferson's band played small roles, along with his wife Rita Coolidge. Kristofferson also brought Bob Dylan into the film, initially hired to write the title song. Dylan eventually wrote the score and played the role of "Alias". Peckinpah had never heard of Dylan, but was reportedly moved by hearing him play the proposed title song and hired him immediately. Among the songs written by Dylan for the film was "Knockin' on Heaven's Door".

Peckinpah deliberately cast his film's supporting roles with legendary Western character actors such as Chill Wills, Katy Jurado, Jack Elam, Slim Pickens, Barry Sullivan (who himself had played Pat Garrett in The Tall Man from 1960 to 1962), Dub Taylor, R.G. Armstrong, Elisha Cook, Jr., and Paul Fix. Jason Robards had starred in Peckinpah's earlier films, the television production Noon Wine (1966) and The Ballad of Cable Hogue (1970), and had a cameo appearance as the governor. The large supporting cast also included Richard Jaeckel, Charles Martin Smith, Harry Dean Stanton, Matt Clark, L.Q. Jones, Emilio Fernández, Don Levy, Aurora Clavel, Luke Askew, Jack Dodson, Richard Bright, and John Beck.

From the beginning, the production was plagued with difficulties. Metro-Goldwyn-Mayer President James Aubrey, for economic reasons, refused to give Peckinpah the time or budget required, forcing the director to rely on local crew members in the Mexican state of Durango. Multiple technical problems, including malfunctioning cameras, led to costly reshoots. Cast and crew members also came down with influenza. Aubrey objected to several scenes that he considered superfluous to the film's plot, and Peckinpah and his crew reportedly worked weekends and lunch hours to secretly complete the sequences. Aubrey began to send telegrams to the set complaining about the number of camera setups that Peckinpah used and the time spent to shoot specific scenes. According to producer Gordon Carroll, the movie's set was "a battleground".

Peckinpah was plagued by alcoholism, with which he struggled for the remainder of his life. This, combined with his clashes with Aubrey and the studio, led to his growing reputation as a difficult, unreliable filmmaker. Reportedly, when Dylan first arrived on the set, he and Kristofferson sat to watch dailies with Peckinpah. The director was so unhappy with the footage that he angrily stood on a folding chair and urinated on the screen. Similar stories began to reach Hollywood, prompting Peckinpah to purchase a full-page ad in The Hollywood Reporter mocking the rumors and the brass at MGM. The Hollywood producers were not amused. The film finished 21 days behind schedule and $1.6 million over budget.

"Peckinpah was apt to strange behavior and moods", Kristofferson recalled. "[Dylan and I] spent a lot of time chatting in our trailers and I told him about my friend Willie Nelson. I asked Bob, 'Why isn't Willie famous? He's a genius.' So, the next day, Bob calls Willie up and gets him to come down to the set, and he made him play his old Martin guitar for ten hours straight. They ended up doing all these old Django Reinhardt tunes. It was fabulous."

== Post-production controversy, release and preview version ==
By the time that Pat Garrett and Billy the Kid was in the editing room, Peckinpah's relationship with the studio and his producers had reached the breaking point. Peckinpah's first cut was 165 minutes. Aubrey, enraged by the cost and production overruns, demanded an unrealistic release date for the film. Peckinpah and his editors, given only three weeks, were forced into a desperate situation to finish editing on time. Furthermore, Aubrey still objected to several sequences in the film which he wanted removed, forcing Peckinpah to engage in protracted negotiations over the film's content. Adding to the problems, Bob Dylan had never done a feature film score and Peckinpah's usual composer, Jerry Fielding, was unhappy with being relegated to a minor role in the scoring process.

Peckinpah completed a preview version of the film at 124 minutes, which was shown to critics on at least one occasion. Martin Scorsese had just made Mean Streets (1973) and was at the screening, and he praised the film as Peckinpah's greatest since The Wild Bunch. This version, however, would not see the light of day for over ten years. Peckinpah was eventually forced out of the production, and Aubrey had the film severely cut from 124 to 106 minutes, resulting in the film being released as a truncated version largely disowned by cast and crew members. This version was a box-office failure, grossing $8 million domestically, of which the studio earned only $2.7 million in theatrical rentals, against a budget of more than $4.6 million. However, the film grossed a total of $11 million worldwide.

The film was also panned by most major critics, who had harbored high expectations for the director's spiritual successor to The Wild Bunch. Though she acknowledged its ambition and "amazing cast", Pauline Kael described the film as "peculiarly unrealized" and mused that "probably nobody involved was very happy about the results".

Roger Ebert of The Chicago Sun-Times rated the film two stars out of four, beginning his review with: "Sam Peckinpah attempted to have his name removed from Pat Garrett and Billy the Kid. I sympathized with him. If this wasn't entirely his work, he shouldn't have had to take the blame." Despite the flaws of bad pacing, lack of tension and Dylan looking uncomfortable in his small role, Ebert praised Coburn's "cool and reliable" performance and Jurado's "nice cameo", and also claimed Kristopherson "here launched a career as a credible male lead". Ebert also noted "Another alarming factor is that no less than six editors are credited. Not assistant editors, but editors; this sets a modern-day record, I think." The editing was so haphazard, Ebert asserted, there were actors listed in the onscreen credits who did not actually appear in the version he saw (such as Dub Taylor). Gene Siskel of the Chicago Tribune awarded the same two-star grade and wrote that the film "appears to have been shot in emotional slow motion, and the self-inflating lethargy and mugging of all concerned reduces the enterprise to an exercise in pretension." Vincent Canby of The New York Times wrote that the film "has the manner of something written for Peckinpah by a writer who'd seen 'The Wild Bunch' and vowed to give the director an important script, something worthy of his talents. Instead, Mr. Wurlitzer has come up with what is apparently an unconscious parody of the Peckinpah concerns for fading frontiers, comradeship and machismo." Canby also found the Bob Dylan music "so oppressive that when it stops we feel giddy with relief, as if a tooth had suddenly stopped aching." Variety declared, "Whereas Peckinpah's nostalgia for a frontier world where might makes right and women were for the taking has previously been communicated via forceful acting and striking visuals, here there are few graces to camouflage the narrative banality."

Not every contemporary review was negative. Kevin Thomas of the Los Angeles Times wrote, "Although 'Pat Garrett and Billy the Kid' (at selected theaters) is approximately 15 minutes shorter than its director Sam Peckinpah cut it, it nevertheless emerges as a remarkable film that is perhaps Peckinpah's best, most mature work to date." Richard Combs of The Monthly Film Bulletin was also generally favorable, declaring that "for all the deliberate—and occasionally over-schematic—summation of [Peckinpah's] previous work, Pat Garrett is remarkable for its intensity of mood (and for the growling, damped-down charisma of Coburn and Kristofferson); a singularly black and poetic evocation of a no-exit life style."

The film remained something of an enigma for the next decade, with rumors flying about other versions and the nature of what had been left out of the release version. Peckinpah himself was in possession of his own preview version, which he often showed to friends as his own definitive vision of the film.

On Rotten Tomatoes, the film holds a rating of 60% from 65 reviews with the consensus: "Sam Peckinpah's mournful salute to the bygone West achieves moments of ruthless poetry, but clear signs of studio-dictated cuts and oft-unintelligible dialogue will make this dirge a slog for some."

== Reappraisal, legacy and special edition ==
In 1988, Turner Home Entertainment, with distribution by MGM, released Peckinpah's preview version of Pat Garrett and Billy the Kid on video and Laserdisc. This version led to a rediscovery and reevaluation of the film, with many critics praising it as a lost masterpiece and proof Peckinpah's vision had been botched by editing beyond his control. The film's reputation has grown substantially since this version was released, and the film has come to be regarded as something of a modern classic, equal in many ways to Peckinpah's earlier films. Kristofferson noted in an interview, though, that Peckinpah had felt that Dylan had been pushed on him by the studio and thus left "Knocking on Heaven's Door" out of the preview version. In Kristofferson's opinion, "Heaven's Door" "was the strongest use of music that I had ever seen in a film. Unfortunately Sam…had a blind spot there."

In 2005, a DVD of the film distributed by Warner Bros. was released containing the preview version as well as a new special edition which combined elements of the theatrical version, the preview version, and several new scenes never released in the previous versions. "An attempt to put those 2 versions together", as we can hear on the same DVD audio commentary. This third version of the film, known as the "special edition", runs 115 minutes, slightly shorter than the preview version.

In July 2024, the film was released on Blu-ray and 4K Ultra HD by The Criterion Collection. That release includes a new "50th Anniversary" cut of the film restored digitally in 4K supervised by editors Paul Seydor and Roger Spottiswoode, a 4K digital restoration of the theatrical cut, and a 2K digital remaster of the director Sam Peckinpah’s Final Preview Cut.

== See also ==
- List of American films of 1973
- List of Western films of the 1970s
