= L. Q. Jones =

American actor (1927–2022)

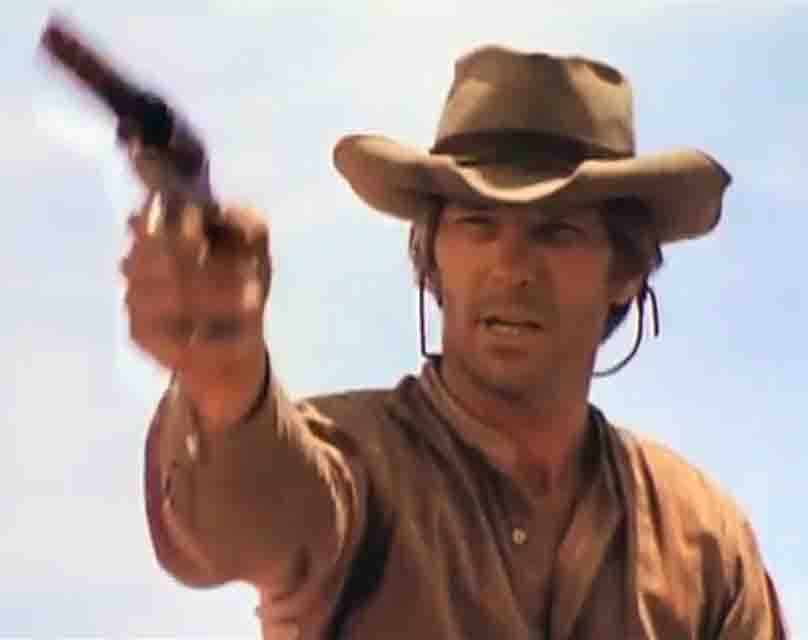
- Jones in trailer for Hang 'Em High (1968)
- Born: Justus Ellis McQueen Jr. August 19, 1927; Beaumont, Texas, U.S.
- Died: July 9, 2022 (aged 94); Los Angeles, California, U.S.
- Occupations: Actor; director
- Years active: 1955–2006
- Spouse: Neta Sue Lewis (m. 1950; div. 1973)

Justus Ellis McQueen Jr. (August 19, 1927 – July 9, 2022), known professionally as L. Q. Jones, was an American actor and director. He appeared in Sam Peckinpah's films Ride the High Country (1962), Major Dundee (1965), The Wild Bunch (1969), The Ballad of Cable Hogue (1970), and Pat Garrett and Billy the Kid (1973). His later film roles include Casino (1995), The Patriot (1998), The Mask of Zorro (1998), and A Prairie Home Companion (2006).

His other roles included Western television series such as Cheyenne (1955), Laramie (1959–63), Wagon Train (1959–64), Rawhide (1963–65), The Virginian (1963–71), and Gunsmoke (1963–72).

Jones was the writer and director of the 1975 science-fiction film A Boy and His Dog, based on Harlan Ellison's 1969 novella of the same name.

== Early life ==
Jones was born August 19, 1927, in Beaumont, in southeastern Texas, the son of Jessie Paralee (née Stephens) and Justus Ellis McQueen, Sr., a railroad worker. At an early age, his mother died following a car accident. He completed his school education from Port Neches–Groves High School in 1945. After serving in the U.S. Navy from 1945 to 1946, Jones attended Lamar Junior College (now Lamar University) and Lon Morris College in Jacksonville, Texas, and then studied law, business, and journalism at the University of Texas at Austin from 1950 to 1951. He worked as a stand-up comic, briefly played professional baseball and American football, and tried ranching in Nicaragua, then turned to acting after corresponding with Fess Parker, his former college roommate.

== Career ==
Jones made his film debut in 1955 in Battle Cry, credited under his birth name Justus McQueen. His character's name in that film was "L. Q. Jones", a name he liked and decided to adopt as his stage name for all of his future acting roles. In 1955, he was cast as Smitty Smith in three episodes of Clint Walker's ABC/Warner Bros. Western series Cheyenne, the first hour-long Western on network television.

Jones appeared in numerous films in the 1960s and '70s. He became a member of Sam Peckinpah's stock company of actors, appearing in his Klondike series (1960–1961), Ride the High Country (1962), Major Dundee (1965), The Wild Bunch (1969), The Ballad of Cable Hogue (1970), and Pat Garrett and Billy the Kid (1973).

Jones was frequently cast alongside his close friend Strother Martin, most memorably as the posse member and bounty hunter T. C. in The Wild Bunch. Jones also appeared as recurring characters on such Western series as Cheyenne (1955), Gunsmoke (1955), Laramie, Two Faces West (1960–1961), and as ranch hand Andy Belden in The Virginian (1962). That same year (1962), Jones appeared as Ollie Earnshaw, a rich rancher looking for a bride, on Lawman, in the episode titled "The Bride".

He was cast in the military drama series Men of Annapolis, on the CBS Western Johnny Ringo and on the NBC Western Jefferson Drum. He made two guest appearances on Perry Mason, including the role of con artist and murder victim Charles B. Barnaby in "The Case of the Lonely Heiress" (1958) and as Edward Lewis in "The Case of the Badgered Brother" (1963). He appeared in Hawaii Five-O, season one, episode 15, in January 1969. He also appeared in an episode of The A-Team titled "Cowboy George" and two episodes of The Fall Guy as Sheriff Dwight Leclerc. In 1971, Jones appeared as Belden in The Men from Shiloh (the final season rebranding of The Virginian) episode titled "The Town Killer".

Jones' other films include Men in War (1957), The Naked and the Dead (1958), Flaming Star (1960), Cimarron (1960), Hell Is for Heroes (1962)' Hang 'Em High (1968), Stay Away, Joe (1968), The Brotherhood of Satan (1971), which he co-produced and wrote, Attack on Terror: The FBI vs. the Ku Klux Klan (1975), White Line Fever (1975), Lone Wolf McQuade (1983); Casino (1995); Tornado! (1996); The Edge (1997), The Mask of Zorro (1998), and A Prairie Home Companion (2006).

Jones directed, produced, and wrote the screenplay for A Boy and His Dog (1975).

== Personal life and death ==
On July 9, 2022, Jones died from natural causes at his Hollywood Hills home in Los Angeles at the age of 94.

== Filmography ==
=== Film ===
Year	Title	Role	Notes
1955	Battle Cry	Private L. Q. Jones	Credited as Justus McQueen
1955	An Annapolis Story	Watson	
1955	Target Zero	Private Felix O'Hara	
1956	Santiago	"Digger"	
1956	Toward the Unknown	2nd Lieutenant Sweeney	
1956	Between Heaven and Hell	Private Kenny	
1956	Love Me Tender	Pardee Fleming	Uncredited
1957	Men in War	Staff Sergeant Samuel Davis	
1957	Operation Mad Ball	"Ozark"	
1957	Gunsight Ridge	Lazy Heart Ranch Hand	
1958	The Young Lions	Private Donnelly	Uncredited
1958	Buchanan Rides Alone	"Pecos" Hill	
1958	The Naked and the Dead	Woodrow "Woody" Wilson	
1958	Torpedo Run	"Hash" Benson	
1959	Warlock	Fen Jiggs	Uncredited
1959	Battle of the Coral Sea	Yeoman Halliday	
1959	Hound-Dog Man	Dave Wilson	
1960	The Gambler, the Nun and the Radio	Rodeo Rider	TV film
1960	Ten Who Dared	Billy "Missouri" Hawkins	
1960	Flaming Star	Tom Howard	
1960	Cimarron	Millis	
1962	Ride the High Country	Sylvus Hammond	
1962	Hell Is for Heroes	Supply Sergeant Frazer	
1963	Showdown	Foray	
1964	Iron Angel	"Buttons"	
1964	The Devil's Bedroom		Director (credited as Justus McQueen)
1964	Apache Rifles	Mike Greer	
1965	Major Dundee	Arthur Hadley	
1966	Nevada Smith	Cowboy	Uncredited
1968	Stay Away, Joe	Bronc Hoverty	
1968	The Counterfeit Killer	Hotel Clerk Hanging Party	
1968	Hang 'Em High	Loomis, Cooper Hanging Party	
1969	The Witchmaker	Unknown	Uncredited
1969	The Wild Bunch	T.C. Nash	
1970	The Ballad of Cable Hogue	Taggart	
1970	The McMasters	Russell	
1971	The Hunting Party	"Hog" Warren	
1971	The Brotherhood of Satan	Sheriff	
1972	43: The Richard Petty Story	Ed Koler	
1972	The Bravos	Ben Lawler	TV film
1973	Pat Garrett & Billy the Kid	"Black" Harris	
1974	Mrs. Sundance	Charlie Siringo	TV movie
1975	A Boy and His Dog	Actor In Porno Film	Director and writer
1975	White Line Fever	Buck	
1975	Winterhawk	Gates	
1976	Banjo Hackett: Roamin' Free	Sheriff Tadlock	TV movie
1976	Mother, Jugs & Speed	Sheriff Davey	
1979	Fast Charlie... the Moonbeam Rider	Floyd	
1982	The Beast Within	Sheriff Bill Pool	
1982	Melanie	Buford	Uncredited
1982	Timerider: The Adventure of Lyle Swann	Ben Potter	
1983	Sacred Ground	Tolbert Coleman	
1983	Lone Wolf McQuade	Ranger Dakota Brown	
1988	Bulletproof	Sergeant O'Rourke	
1989	River of Death	Hiller	
1990	The Legend of Grizzly Adams	Reno	
1994	Lightning Jack	Sheriff Tom	
1995	The Friends of Harry	Senator	
1995	Casino	Commissioner Pat Webb	
1996	Tornado!	Ephram Thorne	TV film
1997	The Edge	Styles	
1998	The Patriot	Frank	
1998	The Mask of Zorro	Jack "Three-Fingered Jack"	
1999	The Jack Bull	Henry Ballard	TV film
2001	Route 666	Sheriff Bob Conaway	
2006	A Prairie Home Companion	Chuck Akers	

=== Television ===
Year	Title	Role	Notes
1955	Cheyenne	"Smitty"	3 episodes
1956	Annie Oakley	Cal Upton / Ned Blane	2 episodes
1957	The Joseph Cotten Show: On Trial	Jedediah "Jed" Boone	Episode: "Dog vs. Biddeford"
1957	The Silent Service	Jack Potter	Episode: "The Final War Patrol"
1958	Flight	(character unnamed)	Episode: "Window in the Sky"
1958	Men of Annapolis	Clint Parker	Episode: "Mister Fireball"
1958	Jefferson Drum	Burdette	Episode: "The Keeney Gang"
1958	Perry Mason	Charles Barnaby	"The Case of the Lonely Heiress"
1958–1962	Lassie	Attorney Blake	3 episodes
1959	Black Saddle	Jack Shepherd	Episode: "Client: Banks"
1959	Tightrope!	Earl Bell	Episode: "The Frame"
1959	Wichita Town	Walter	Episode: "Drifting"
1959	Laramie	John MacLean	Episode: "Dark Verdict"
1959	Wagon Train	"Squirrel" Charvanaugh	Episode: "The Old Man Charvanaugh Story"
1959–1961	Tales of Wells Fargo	Striker	2 episodes
1960	Johnny Ringo	Billy "Billy Boy" Jethro	Episode: "Four Came Quietly"
1960	Lock-Up	"Tex"	Episode: "Death and Taxes"
1960	Buick-Electra Playhouse	Rodeo Rider	Episode: "The Gambler, the Nun and the Radio"
1960	Klondike	Joe Teel	3 episodes
1960	The Rebel	Otis Rumpf	2 episodes
1960	Two Faces West	Unknown	Episode: "The Last Man"
1960	Laramie	Actor	Episode: "The Dark Trail"
1961	The Detectives Starring Robert Taylor	Betty Merriwether	Episode: "Kinfolk"
1961	The Life and Legend of Wyatt Earp	"Tex"	Episode: "Casey and the Clowns"
1961	The Americans	Yonts	Episode: "The Coward"
1961	Two Faces West	Unknown	Episode: "The Noose"
1961	Laramie	Homer	Episode: "Cactus Lady"
1961	Laramie	Truk	Episode: "Siege at Jubilee"
1961	Wagon Train	Lenny	Episode: "The Christopher Hale Story"
1962	Lawman	Ollie Earnshaw	Episode: "The Bride"
1962	The Rifleman	Charley Breen	Episode: "Day of Reckoning"
1962	Wide Country	Whicker	Episode: "Straitjacket for an Indian"
1962	Ben Casey	Stan Galloway	Episode: "The Fireman Who Raised Rabbits"
1962	Have Gun – Will Travel	"Little" Fontana	Episode: "Lazarus"
1962	Have Gun – Will Travel	Bill Renn, Drifting Cowboy	Episode: "The Waiting Room"
1962	Laramie	Johnny Duncan	Episode: "The Replacement"
1962	Laramie	Neeley	Episode: "Among the Missing"
1962	Laramie	Frank Keefer	Episode: "Shadow of the Past"
1963	Have Gun – Will Travel	Hector MacKenby	Episode: "Debutante"
1963	Route 66	"Babe"	Episode: "Shall Forfeit His Dog and Ten Shillings to the King"
1963	Laramie	Sergeant	Episode: "The Stranger"
1963	Empire	L. Q.	Episode: "The Convention"
1963	Perry Mason	Lewis	Episode: "The Case of the Badgered Brother"
1963	Wagon Train	Esdras	Episode: "Charlie Wooster—Outlaw"
1963	Wagon Train	Ike Truman	Episode: "The Robert Harrison Clarke Story"
1963	Rawhide	George Cornelius	Episode: "Incident at El Crucero"
1963–1971	The Virginian	Andy Belden	25 episodes
1964	Wagon Train	Private James Jones	Episode: "The Duncan McIvor Story"
1964	Rawhide	Corporal Wayne	Episode: "Incident at Gila Flats"
1964	Rawhide	Luke	Episode: "The Race"
1965	Rawhide	P.J. Peters	2 episodes
1965	My Favorite Martian	Frank James	Episode: "The Time Machine Is Waking Up That Old Gang of Mine"
1966	A Man Called Shenandoah	Ben Lloyd	Episode: "Rope's End"
1966	Pistols 'n' Petticoats	1st Gunman	Episode: "Sir Richard of Wretched"
1966	ABC Stage 67	Deputy	Episode: "Noon Wine"
1966	Bob Hope Presents the Chrysler Theatre	The Hotel Clerk	Episode: "The Faceless Man"
1966	The Big Valley	Cort	Episode: "By Force and Violence"
1967	The Big Valley	Curtis	Episode: "Court Martial"
1967	The Big Valley	Earl Vaughan	Episode: "Showdown in Limbo"
1967	The Big Valley	Hutch	Episode: "Ambush"
1967	Bob Hope Presents the Chrysler Theatre	Ernie Packer	Episode: "The Lady is My Wife"
1967	The F.B.I.	Wesley Davis	Episode: "The Gold Card"
1967	Cimarron Strip	Barnes	Episode: "The Battleground"
1967	Cimarron Strip	Lummy	Episode: "The Search"
1967	Hondo	Allie	Episode: "Hondo and the Death Drive"
1968	The Big Valley	Gus Vandiver	Episode: "Fall of a Hero"
1969	Gunsmoke	Kittridge	Episode: "The Good Samaritans"
1969	Hawaii Five-O	Colonel Lew Cardell	Episode: "King of the Hill"
1969	Lancer	Slate Meek	Episode: "Blind Man's Bluff"
1970	Gunsmoke	Sumner Pendleton	Episode: "The Gun"
1970	Gunsmoke	Nix	Episode: "Albert"
1971	Alias Smith and Jones	Clint Weaver	Episode: "Stagecoach Seven"
1971	The F.B.I.	Al Tanner	Episode: "Dynasty of Hate"
1971	Cannon	Phil Mackey	Episode: "Fool's Gold"
1971	Cade's County	Grover Curtis	Episode: "Delegate at Large"
1972	Gunsmoke	"Gecko" Ridley	Episode: "Tara"
1972	Alias Smith and Jones	Drunk	Episode: "The Men That Corrupted Hadleyburg"
1972	The Delphi Bureau	Cole	Episode: "The Man Upstairs-The Man Downstairs Project"
1972	The Bold Ones: The New Doctors	Dr. Dietrich	Episode: "A Purge of Madness"
1972	Alias Smith and Jones	Peterson	Episode: "McGuffin"
1973	Ironside	Harry Ashton	Episode: "The Caller"
1973	Kung Fu	Sergeant Straight	Episode: "An Eye for an Eye"
1973	Assignment Vienna	Actor	Episode: "A Deadly Shade of Green"
1973	Cannon	Sheriff Virgil Spoontz	Episode: "Perfect Alibi"
1974	The Magician	Johnson	2 episodes
1974	The Strange and Deadly Occurrence	Sheriff Berlinger	—
1974	Ironside	Cardiff	Episode: "Riddle at 24,000"
1975	Kung Fu	Major Clarke Bealson	Episode: "The Last Raid"
1975	Matt Helm	Actor	Episode: "Deadly Breed"
1976	Movin' On	"Flakey" Edwards	Episode: "The Big Switch"
1976	Charlie's Angels	Sergeant Billings	Episode: "Bullseye"
1977	McCloud	Kenny Hingle	Episode: "The Moscow Connection"
1978	CHiPs	Hoskins	Episode: "Rustling"
1978	Charlie's Angels	Dan Jarvis	Episode: "Angels in the Backfield"
1978	Columbo	Gun Dealer	Episode: "The Conspirators"
1978	The Eddie Capra Mysteries	Dr. Amos	Episode: "Dying Declaration"
1979	How the West Was Won	Batlin	Episode: "Luke"
1979	The Runaways	Matthew Turner	Episode: "They'll Never Forgive Me"
1979	The Incredible Hulk	Jake White	Episode: "Jake"
1979	The Dukes of Hazzard	Warren	Episode: "Witness for the Persecution"
1979	Charlie's Angels	Burdette	Episode: "Angel Hunt"
1980	Vega$	Everett Mason	Episode: "The Lido Girls"
1980	Charlie's Angels	Sam Mason	Episode: "An Angel's Trail"
1980	The Incredible Hulk	The Director	Episode: "On the Line"
1980	Enos	Garrett	Episode: "Blu Flu"
1981	Walking Tall	John Whitter	Episode: "Hitman"
1981	Riker	Massey	Episode: "Honkytonk"
1982	The Dukes of Hazzard	Morton	Episode: "The Sound of Music – Hazzard Style"
1982	The Fall Guy	Sheriff Dwight Le Clerc	2 episodes
1983	Voyagers!	Ground Control #1	Episode: "All Fall Down"
1983–1984	The Yellow Rose	Sheriff Lew Wallace	10 episodes
1984	Matt Houston	Sheriff Loftus	Episode: "The Monster"
1986	The A-Team	Chuck Danford	Episode: "Cowboy George"
1991	The New Adam-12	Mr. Weaver	Episode: "Crack House"
1994	Walker, Texas Ranger	Billy Selkirk	Episode: "Deadly Reunion"
1994–1996	Renegade	Nathan Wayne	5 episodes
2004	Dr. Vegas	"Hondo"	Episode: "All In"
