= Phil Feldman =

American film producer

Phil Feldman (born c. 1922 - October 6, 1991) was an American film producer.

== Filmography ==
| Year | Film | Notes |
|---|---|---|
| 1966 | You're a Big Boy Now | Producer |
| 1969 | The Wild Bunch | Producer |
| 1970 | The Ballad of Cable Hogue | Executive producer |
| 1973 | Summer Wishes, Winter Dreams | Executive producer |
| 1974 | For Pete's Sake | Executive producer |
| 1975 | Posse | Executive producer |
| 1976 | The Gumball Rally | Executive producer (uncredited) |
| 1982 | The Toy | Producer |
| 1983 | Blue Thunder | Executive producer |
| 1986 | Stewardess School | Producer |
