= Sam Peckinpah =

American filmmaker (1925–1984)

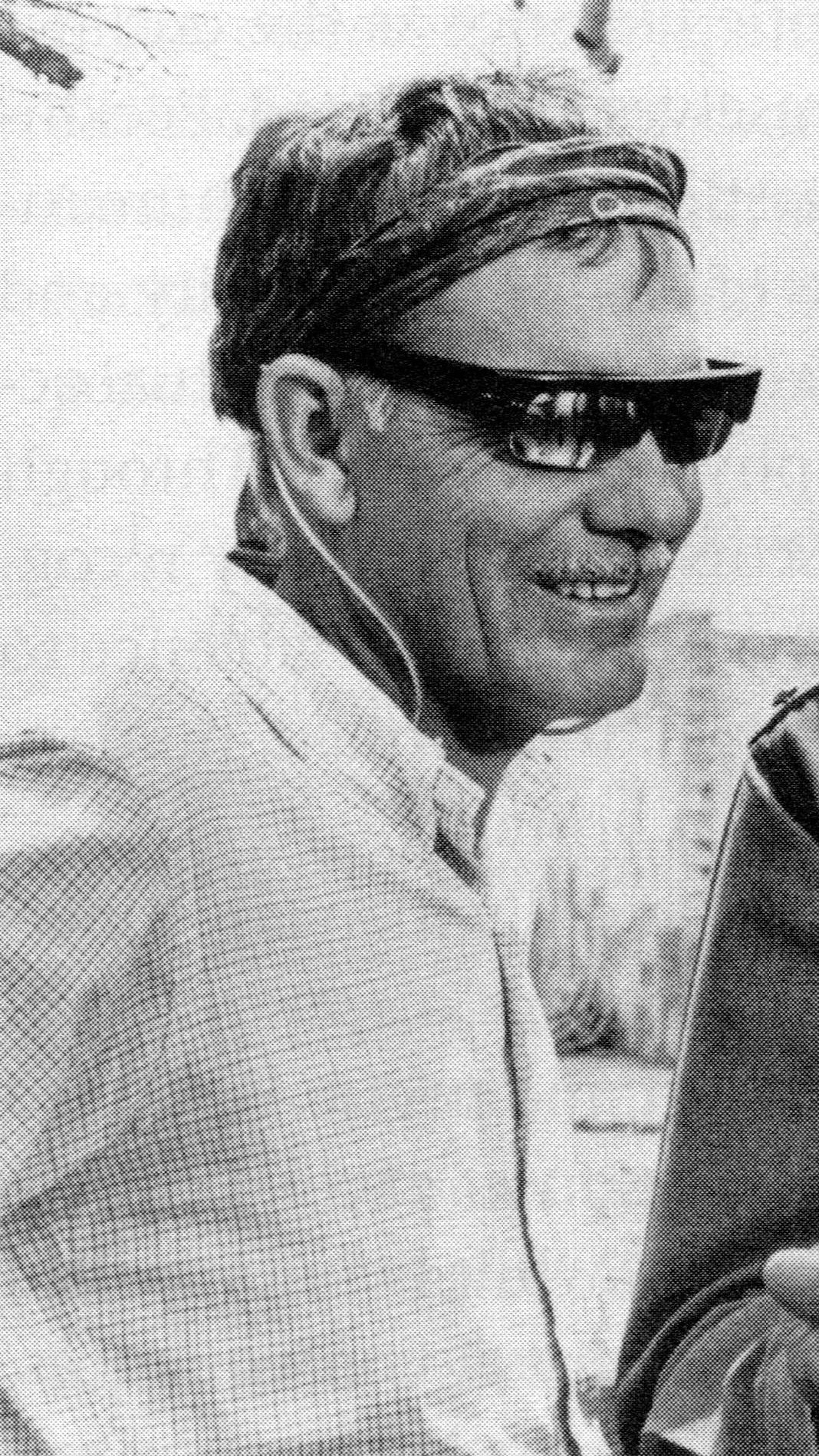
- Peckinpah in 1968
- Born: David Samuel Peckinpah; February 21, 1925; Fresno, California, U.S.
- Died: December 28, 1984 (aged 59); Inglewood, California, U.S.
- Education: California State University, Fresno (BA); University of Southern California (MA)
- Occupations: Film director; screenwriter; actor
- Years active: 1957–1984
- Spouses: Marie Selland (m. 1947; div. 1960) Begoña Palacios (m. 1964; div. 1965) (m. 1965; div. 1967) (m. 1974) Joie Gould (m. 1971; div. 1972)
- Children: 5
- Relatives: Denver S. Church (grandfather); David Peckinpah (nephew); Roger Peckinpaugh (cousin)
- Military career
- Allegiance: United States
- Branch: United States Marine Corps
- Service years: 1943–46
- Conflicts: World War II; Pacific War

David Samuel Peckinpah (/ˈpɛkɪnˌpɑː/; February 21, 1925 – December 28, 1984) was an American filmmaker and actor. He was known for his revisionist approach to the Western genre, employing a visually innovative and explicit depiction of action and violence. His 1969 film The Wild Bunch received two Academy Award nominations and was ranked No. 80 on the American Film Institute's Top 100 list.

His other notable films included Ride the High Country (1962), Major Dundee (1965), The Ballad of Cable Hogue (1970), Straw Dogs (1971), The Getaway (1972), Pat Garrett and Billy the Kid (1973), Bring Me the Head of Alfredo Garcia (1974), Cross of Iron (1977), and Convoy (1978). Peckinpah was also known for his contributions to the television series The Rifleman (1958–63) and The Westerner (1960).

Peckinpah's films deal with the conflict between values and ideals, as well as the corruption and violence in human society. His characters are often loners or losers who desire to be honorable but are forced to compromise in order to survive in a world of nihilism and brutality. He was given the nickname "Bloody Sam" owing to the violence in his films. His combative personality, along with years of alcohol and drug abuse, affected his professional legacy. The production of many of his films included battles with producers and crew members, damaging his reputation and career during his lifetime.

== Family origins ==
The Peckinpahs originated from the Frisian Islands in the northwest of Europe. Both sides of Peckinpah's family migrated to the American West by covered wagon in the mid-19th century. Peckinpah and several relatives often claimed Native American ancestry, but this has been denied by surviving family members. Peckinpah's great-grandfather, Rice Peckinpaugh, a merchant and farmer in Indiana, moved to Humboldt County, California, in the 1850s, working in the logging business, and changed the spelling of the family name to Peckinpah.

Peckinpah Meadow and Peckinpah Creek, where the family ran a lumber mill on a mountain in the High Sierra east of North Fork, California, have been officially named on U.S. geographical maps. Peckinpah's maternal grandfather was Denver S. Church, a cattle rancher, Superior Court judge and United States Congressman of a California district including Fresno County.

Sam Peckinpah's nephew is David Peckinpah, who was a television producer and director, as well as a screenwriter. He was a cousin of former New York Yankees shortstop Roger Peckinpaugh.

== Early years ==
David Samuel Peckinpah was born February 21, 1925, to David Edward (1895–1960) and Fern Louise (née Church) Peckinpah (1893–1983) in Fresno, California, where he attended both grammar school and high school. He had an elder brother, Denver Charles (1916–1996). He spent much time skipping classes with his brother to engage in cowboy activities on their grandfather Denver Church's ranch, including trapping, branding, and shooting. During the 1930s and 1940s, Coarsegold and Bass Lake were still populated with descendants of the miners and ranchers of the 19th century. Many of these descendants worked on Church's ranch. At that time, it was a rural area undergoing extreme change, and this exposure is believed to have affected Peckinpah's Western films later in life.

He played on the junior varsity football team while at Fresno High School, but frequent fighting and discipline problems caused his parents to enroll him in the San Rafael Military Academy for his senior year.

In 1943, he joined the United States Marine Corps. Within two years, his battalion was sent to China with the task of disarming Japanese soldiers and repatriating them following World War II. While his duty did not include combat, he claimed to have witnessed acts of war between Chinese and Japanese soldiers. According to friends, these included several acts of torture and the murder of a laborer by sniper fire. The American Marines were not permitted to intervene. Peckinpah also claimed he was shot during an attack by Communist forces. Also during his final weeks as a Marine, he applied for discharge in Beijing, so he could marry a local woman, but was refused. His experiences in China reportedly deeply affected Peckinpah, and may have influenced his depictions of violence in his films.

After being discharged in Los Angeles, he attended California State University, Fresno, where he studied history. While a student, he met and married his first wife, Marie Selland, in 1947. A drama major, Selland introduced Peckinpah to the theater department and he became interested in directing for the first time. During his senior year, he adapted and directed a one-hour version of Tennessee Williams' The Glass Menagerie.

After graduation in 1948, Peckinpah enrolled in graduate studies in drama at University of Southern California. He spent two seasons as the director in residence at Huntington Park Civic Theatre near Los Angeles before obtaining his master's degree. He was asked to stay another year, but Peckinpah began working as a stagehand at KLAC-TV in the belief that television experience would eventually lead to work in films. Even during this early stage of his career, Peckinpah was developing a combative streak. Reportedly, he was kicked off the set of The Liberace Show for not wearing a tie, and he refused to cue a car salesman during a live feed because of his attitude towards stagehands.

In 1954, Peckinpah was hired as a dialogue coach for the film Riot in Cell Block 11. His job entailed acting as an assistant for the movie's director, Don Siegel. The film was shot on location at Folsom Prison. Reportedly, the warden was reluctant to allow the filmmakers to work at the prison until he was introduced to Peckinpah. The warden knew of his influential family from Fresno and was immediately cooperative. Siegel's location work and his use of actual prisoners as extras in the film made a lasting impression on Peckinpah. He worked as a dialogue coach on four additional Siegel films: Private Hell 36 (1954), An Annapolis Story (1955, and co-starring L. Q. Jones), Invasion of the Body Snatchers (1956) and Crime in the Streets (1956).

Invasion of the Body Snatchers, in which Peckinpah appeared as Charlie the meter reader, starred Kevin McCarthy and Dana Wynter. It became one of the most critically praised science fiction films of the 1950s. Peckinpah claimed to have done an extensive rewrite on the film's screenplay, a statement which remains controversial.

Throughout much of his adult life, Peckinpah was affected by alcoholism, and, later, other forms of drug addiction. According to some accounts, he also suffered from mental illness, possibly manic depression or paranoia. It is believed his drinking problems began during his service in the military while stationed in China, when he frequented the saloons of Tianjin and Beijing. After divorcing Selland, the mother of his first four children, in 1960, he married Mexican actress Begoña Palacios in 1964. A stormy relationship developed, and over the years they married on three separate occasions. They had one daughter together. His personality reportedly often swung between a sweet, softly-spoken, artistic disposition, and bouts of rage and violence, during which he verbally and physically abused himself and others. An experienced hunter, Peckinpah was fascinated with firearms and was known to shoot the mirrors in his house while abusing alcohol, an image which occurs several times in his films.

Peckinpah's reputation as a hard-living brute with a taste for violence, inspired by the content in his most popular films and in many ways perpetuated by himself, affected his artistic legacy. His friends and family have claimed this does a disservice to a man who was actually more complex than generally credited. He used such actors as Warren Oates, L. Q. Jones, R. G. Armstrong, James Coburn, Ben Johnson, and Kris Kristofferson, and collaborators (Jerry Fielding, Lucien Ballard, Gordon Dawson, and Martin Baum) in many of his films, and several of his friends and assistants stuck by him to the end of his life.

Peckinpah spent a great deal of his life in Mexico after his marriage to Palacios, eventually buying property in the country. He was fascinated by the Mexican lifestyle and Mexican culture, and he often portrayed it with an unusual sentimentality and romanticism in his films.

From 1979 until his death, Peckinpah lived at the Murray Hotel in Livingston, Montana. Peckinpah was seriously ill during his final years, as a lifetime of hard living caught up with him. Regardless, he continued to work until his last months. He died of heart failure at age 59 on December 28, 1984, in Inglewood, California. At the time, he was working on the script for On the Rocks, a projected independent film to be shot in San Francisco.

== Television career ==
On the recommendation of Don Siegel, Peckinpah established himself during the late 1950s as a scriptwriter of Western series of the era, selling scripts to Gunsmoke, Have Gun – Will Travel, Broken Arrow, Klondike, The Rifleman, and Dick Powell's Zane Grey Theatre, the latter Four Star Television productions. He wrote one episode "The Town" (December 13, 1957) for the CBS series, Trackdown.

Peckinpah wrote a screenplay from the novel The Authentic Death of Hendry Jones, a draft that evolved into the 1961 Marlon Brando film One-Eyed Jacks. His writing led to directing, and he directed a 1958 episode of Broken Arrow (generally credited as his first official directing job) and several 1960 episodes of Klondike, (co-starring James Coburn, L. Q. Jones, Ralph Taeger, Joi Lansing, and Mari Blanchard). He also directed the CBS sitcom Mr. Adams and Eve, starring Howard Duff and Ida Lupino.

In 1958, Peckinpah wrote a script for Gunsmoke that was rejected due to content. He reworked the screenplay, titled The Sharpshooter, and sold it to Zane Grey Theater. The episode received popular response and became the television series The Rifleman, starring Chuck Connors. Peckinpah directed four episodes of the series (with guest stars R. G. Armstrong and Warren Oates), but left after the first year. The Rifleman ran for five seasons and achieved enduring popularity in syndication.

=== The Westerner ===
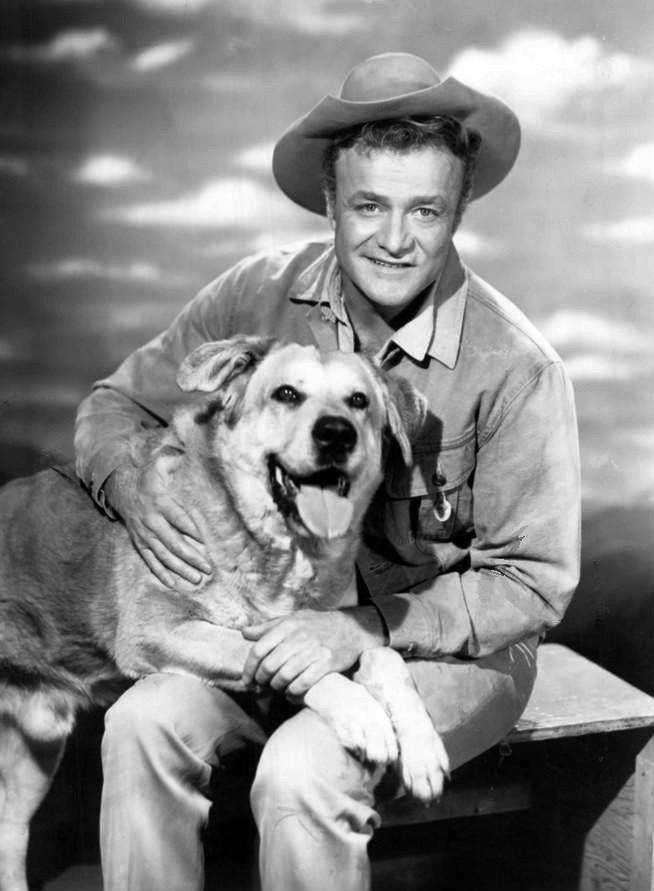
Brian Keith with Spike in The Westerner (1960)

During this time, he also created the television series The Westerner for Four Star Television, starring Brian Keith and in three episodes also featuring John Dehner. Peckinpah wrote and directed a pilot called Trouble at Tres Cruzes, which was aired in March 1959 before the actual series was made in 1960. Peckinpah acted as producer of the series, having a hand in the writing of each episode and directing five of them. Critically praised, the show ran for only 13 episodes before cancellation mainly due to its gritty content detailing the drifting, laconic cowboy Dave Blassingame (Brian Keith). Especially noteworthy are the episodes Jeff and Hand on the Gun, extraordinary in their depiction of violence and their imaginative directing, forerunners of his later feature films. Despite its short run, The Westerner and Peckinpah were nominated by the Producers Guild of America for Best Filmed Series. An episode of the series eventually served as the basis for Tom Gries' 1968 film Will Penny starring Charlton Heston. The Westerner, which has since achieved cult status, further established Peckinpah as a talent to be reckoned with.

In 1962, Peckinpah directed two hour-long episodes for The Dick Powell Theater. In the second of these, The Losers, an updated remake of The Westerner set in the present day with Lee Marvin as Dave Blassingame and Keenan Wynn as Dehner's character Bergundy Smith, he mixed slow motion, fast motion and stills together to capture violence, a technique famously put to more sophisticated use in 1969s The Wild Bunch.

== Early film career ==
=== The Deadly Companions ===
After cancellation of The Westerner, Brian Keith was cast as the male lead in the 1961 Western film The Deadly Companions. He suggested Peckinpah as director and the project's producer Charles B. Fitzsimons accepted the idea. By most accounts, the low-budget film shot on location in Arizona was a learning process for Peckinpah, who feuded with Fitzsimons (brother of the film's star Maureen O'Hara) over the screenplay and staging of the scenes. Reportedly, Fitzsimons refused to allow Peckinpah to give direction to O'Hara. Unable to rewrite the screenplay or edit the picture, Peckinpah vowed to never again direct a film unless he had script control. The Deadly Companions passed largely without notice and is the least known of Peckinpah's films.

=== Ride the High Country ===
His second film, Ride the High Country (1962), was based on the screenplay Guns in the Afternoon written by N.B. Stone Jr. Producer Richard Lyons admired Peckinpah's work on The Westerner and offered him the directing job. Peckinpah did an extensive rewrite of the screenplay, including personal references from his own childhood growing up on Denver Church's ranch, and even naming one of the mining towns "Coarsegold". He based the character of Steve Judd, a once-famous lawman fallen on hard times, on his own father David Peckinpah. In the screenplay, Judd and old friend Gil Westrum are hired to transport gold from a mining community through dangerous territory. Westrum hopes to talk Judd into taking the gold for themselves. Along the way, following Judd's example, Westrum slowly realizes his own self-respect is far more important than profit. During the final shootout, when Judd and Westrum stand up to a trio of men, Judd is fatally wounded but his death serves as Westrum's salvation, a Catholic tragedy woven from the cloth of the Western genre. This sort of salvation became a major theme in many Peckinpah's later films. Starring aging Western stars Joel McCrea and Randolph Scott in their final major screen roles, the film initially went unnoticed in the United States but was an enormous success in Europe. Beating Federico Fellini's 8½ for first prize at the Belgium Film Festival, the film was hailed by foreign critics as a brilliant reworking of the Western genre. New York critics also discovered Peckinpah's unusual Western, with Newsweek naming Ride the High Country the best film of the year and Time placing it on its ten-best list. By some critics, the film is admired as one of Peckinpah's greatest works.

=== Major Dundee ===
Peckinpah's next film, Major Dundee (1965), was the first of Peckinpah's many unfortunate experiences with the major studios that financed his productions. Based on a screenplay by Harry Julian Fink, the film was to star Charlton Heston. Peckinpah was hired as director after Heston viewed producer Jerry Bresler's private screening of Ride the High Country. Heston liked the film and called Peckinpah, saying, "I'd like to work with you." The sprawling screenplay told the story of Union cavalry officer Major Dundee who commands a New Mexico outpost of Confederate prisoners. When an Apache war chief wipes out a company and kidnaps several children, Dundee throws together a makeshift army, including unwilling Confederate veterans, black Federal soldiers, and traditional Western types, and takes off after the Indians. Dundee becomes obsessed with his quest and heads deep into the wilderness of Mexico with his exhausted men in tow.

Filming began without a completed screenplay, and Peckinpah chose several remote locations in Mexico, causing the film to go heavily overbudget. Intimidated by the size and scope of the project, Peckinpah reportedly drank heavily each night after shooting. He also fired at least 15 crew members. At one point, Peckinpah's mean streak and abusiveness towards the actors so enraged Heston that the normally even-tempered star threatened to run the director through with his cavalry saber if he did not show more courtesy to the cast. Shooting ended 15 days over schedule and $1.5 million more than budgeted with Peckinpah and producer Bresler no longer on speaking terms. The movie, detailing themes and sequences Peckinpah mastered later in his career, was taken away from him and substantially reedited. An incomplete mess which today exists in a variety of versions, Major Dundee performed poorly at the box office and was trashed by critics (though its standing has improved over the years). Peckinpah maintained, nonetheless, throughout his life that his original version of Major Dundee was among his best films, but his reputation was severely damaged.

Peckinpah was next signed to direct The Cincinnati Kid, a gambling drama about a young prodigy who takes on an old master during a big New Orleans poker match. Before filming started, producer Martin Ransohoff began to receive phone calls about the Major Dundee ordeal and was told Peckinpah was impossible to work with. Peckinpah decided to shoot in black and white and was hoping to transform the screenplay into a social realist saga about a kid surviving the tough streets of the Great Depression. After four days of filming, which reportedly included some nude scenes, Ransohoff disliked the rushes and immediately fired him. Eventually directed by Norman Jewison and starring Steve McQueen, the film went on to become a 1965 hit.

=== Noon Wine ===
Peckinpah caught a lucky break in 1966 when producer Daniel Melnick needed a writer and director to adapt Katherine Anne Porter's short novel Noon Wine for television. Melnick was a big fan of The Westerner and Ride the High Country, and had heard Peckinpah had been unfairly fired from The Cincinnati Kid. Against the objections of many within the industry, Melnick hired Peckinpah and gave him free rein. Peckinpah completed the script, which Porter enthusiastically endorsed, and the project became an hour-long presentation for ABC Stage 67.

Taking place in turn of the century West Texas, Noon Wine was a dark tragedy about a farmer's act of futile murder which leads to suicide. Starring Jason Robards and Olivia de Havilland, the film was a critical hit, with Peckinpah nominated by the Writers Guild for Best Television Adaptation and the Directors Guild of America for Best Television Direction. Robards kept a personal copy of the film in his private collection for years as he considered the project to be one of his most satisfying professional experiences. A rare film which had no home video release until 2014, Noon Wine is today considered one of Peckinpah's most intimate works, revealing his dramatic potential and artistic depth.

== International fame ==
=== The Wild Bunch ===
The surprising success of Noon Wine laid the groundwork for one of the most explosive comebacks in film history. In 1967, Warner Bros.-Seven Arts producers Kenneth Hyman and Phil Feldman were interested in having Peckinpah rewrite and direct an adventure film, The Diamond Story. An alternative screenplay written by Roy N. Sickner and Walon Green was the Western The Wild Bunch. At the time, William Goldman's screenplay Butch Cassidy and the Sundance Kid had recently been purchased by 20th Century Studios.

It was quickly decided that The Wild Bunch, which had several similarities to Goldman's work, would be produced in order to beat Butch Cassidy to the theaters. By the fall of 1967, Peckinpah was rewriting the screenplay into what became The Wild Bunch. Filmed on location in Mexico, Peckinpah's epic work was inspired by a number of forces—his hunger to return to films, the violence seen in Arthur Penn's Bonnie and Clyde, America's growing frustration with the Vietnam War, and what he perceived to be the utter lack of reality seen in Westerns up to that time. He set out to make a film which portrayed not only the vicious violence of the period, but the crude men attempting to survive the era. During this period, Peckinpah said that his life was changed by seeing Carlos Saura's La Caza (1966), which profoundly influenced his subsequent oeuvre.

The film detailed a gang of veteran outlaws on the Texas/Mexico border in 1913 trying to survive within a rapidly approaching modern world. The Wild Bunch is framed by two ferocious and infamous gunfights, beginning with a failed robbery of the railway company office and concluding with the outlaws battling the Mexican army in suicidal vengeance prompted by the brutal torture and murder of one of their members.

Irreverent and unprecedented in its explicit detail, the 1969 film was an instant success. Multiple scenes attempted in Major Dundee, including slow motion action sequences, characters leaving a village as if in a funeral procession and the use of inexperienced locals as extras, were perfected in The Wild Bunch. Many critics denounced its violence as sadistic and exploitative. Other critics and filmmakers hailed the originality of its unique rapid editing style, created for the first time in this film and ultimately becoming a Peckinpah trademark, and praised the reworking of traditional Western themes. It was the beginning of Peckinpah's international fame, and he and his work remained controversial for the rest of his life. The film was ranked No. 80 on the American Film Institute's top 100 list of the greatest American films ever made and No. 69 as the most thrilling, but the controversy has not diminished.

The Wild Bunch was re-released for its 25th anniversary, and received an NC-17 rating from the MPAA. Peckinpah received his only Academy Award nomination (for Best Original Screenplay) for this film.

=== The Ballad of Cable Hogue ===
Defying audience expectations, as he often did, Peckinpah immediately followed The Wild Bunch with the elegiac, funny and mostly non-violent 1970 Western The Ballad of Cable Hogue. Using many of the same cast (L. Q. Jones, Strother Martin) and crew members of The Wild Bunch, the film covered three years in the life of small-time entrepreneur Cable Hogue (Jason Robards) who decides to make his living by remaining in the desert after having miraculously discovered water when he had been abandoned there to die. He opens his business along a stagecoach line, only to see his dreams end with the appearance of the first automobile on the horizon.

Shot on location in the Valley of Fire in Nevada, the film was plagued by poor weather, Peckinpah's renewed drinking and his brusque firing of 36 crew members. The chaotic filming wrapped 19 days over schedule and $3 million over budget, effectively terminating his tenure with Warner Bros.-Seven Arts. In retrospect, it was a damaging career move as Deliverance and Jeremiah Johnson, critical and enduring box office hits, were in development at the time and Peckinpah was considered the first choice to direct both films.

Largely ignored upon its initial release, The Ballad of Cable Hogue has been rediscovered in recent years and is often held up by critics as exemplary of the breadth of Peckinpah's talents. They claim that the film proves Peckinpah's ability to make unconventional and original work without resorting to explicit violence. Over the years, Peckinpah cited the film as one of his favorites.

=== Straw Dogs ===
His alienation from Warner Brothers once again left him with a limited number of directing jobs. Peckinpah traveled to England to direct Straw Dogs (1971), one of his darkest and most psychologically disturbing films. Produced by Daniel Melnick, who had previously worked with Peckinpah on Noon Wine, the film's screenplay was based on the novel The Siege of Trencher's Farm by Gordon Williams.

It starred Dustin Hoffman as David Sumner, a timid American mathematician who leaves the chaos of college anti-war protests to live with his young wife Amy (Susan George) in her native village in Cornwall, England. Resentment of David's presence by the locals slowly builds to a shocking climax when the mild-mannered academic is forced to violently defend his home. Peckinpah rewrote the existing screenplay, inspired by the books African Genesis and The Territorial Imperative by Robert Ardrey, which argued that man was essentially a carnivore who instinctively battled over control of territory.

The character of David Sumner, taunted and humiliated by the violent town locals, is eventually cornered within his home where he loses control and kills several of the men during the violent conclusion. Straw Dogs deeply divided critics, some of whom praised its artistry and its confrontation of human savagery, while others attacked it as a misogynistic and fascistic celebration of violence.

Much of the criticism centered on Amy's complicated and lengthy rape scene, which Peckinpah reportedly attempted to base on his own personal fears rooted in past failed marriages. To this day, the scene is attacked by some critics as an ugly male-chauvinist fantasy. The film was for many years banned on video in the UK.

=== Junior Bonner ===
Despite his growing alcoholism and controversial reputation, Peckinpah was prolific during this period of his life. In May 1971, weeks after completing Straw Dogs, he returned to the United States to begin work on Junior Bonner. Like Straw Dogs it was financed by ABC. The lyrical screenplay by Jeb Rosenbrook, depicting the changing times of society and binding family ties, appealed to Peckinpah's tastes. He accepted the project, at the time concerned with being typed as a director of violent action. The film was his final attempt to make a low-key, dramatic work in the vein of Noon Wine and The Ballad of Cable Hogue.

Filmed on location in Prescott, Arizona, the story covered a week in the life of aging rodeo rider Junior "JR" Bonner (Steve McQueen) who returns to his hometown to compete in an annual rodeo competition. Promoted as a Steve McQueen action vehicle, the film's reviews were mixed and the film performed poorly at the box office. Peckinpah remarked, "I made a film where nobody got shot and nobody went to see it." The film's reputation has grown over the years as many critics consider Junior Bonner to be one of Peckinpah's most sympathetic works, while also noting McQueen's earnest performance.

=== The Getaway ===
Eager to work with Peckinpah again, Steve McQueen presented him Walter Hill's screenplay to The Getaway. Based on the Jim Thompson novel, the gritty crime thriller detailed lovers on the run following a dangerous robbery. Both Peckinpah and McQueen needed a hit, and they immediately began working on the film in February 1972. Peckinpah had no pretensions about making The Getaway, as his only goal was to create a highly polished thriller to boost his market value. McQueen played Doc McCoy, a convicted robber who colludes with corrupt businessman Jack Benyon (Ben Johnson) to be released from prison and later masterminds a bank heist organized by Benyon.

A series of double-crosses ensues and Doc and his wife Carol (MacGraw) attempt to flee from their pursuers to Mexico. Replete with explosions, car chases and intense shootouts, the film became Peckinpah's biggest financial success to date earning more than $25 million at the box office. Though strictly a commercial product, Peckinpah's creative touches abound throughout, most notably during the intricately edited opening sequence when McQueen's character is suffering from the pressures of prison life. The film remains popular and was remade in 1994, starring Alec Baldwin and Kim Basinger.

== Later career ==
The year 1973 marked the beginning of the most difficult period of Peckinpah's life and career. While still filming The Getaway in El Paso, Texas, Peckinpah sneaked across the border into Juarez in April 1972 and married Joie Gould. He had met Gould in England while filming Straw Dogs, and she had since been his companion and a part-time crew member. Peckinpah's intake of alcohol had increased dramatically while making The Getaway, and he became fond of saying, "I can't direct when I'm sober." He began to have violent mood swings and explosions of rage, at one point assaulting Gould. After four months, she returned to England and filed for divorce. Devastated by the breakup, Peckinpah fell into a self-destructive pattern of almost continuous alcohol consumption, and his health was unstable for the remainder of his life.

=== Pat Garrett and Billy the Kid ===
It was in this state of mind that Peckinpah agreed to make Pat Garrett and Billy the Kid (1973) for Metro-Goldwyn-Mayer. Based on the screenplay by Rudolph Wurlitzer, who had previously penned Two-Lane Blacktop, a film admired by Peckinpah, the director was convinced that he was about to make his definitive statement on the Western genre. The script offered Peckinpah the opportunity to explore themes that appealed to him: two former partners forced by changing times onto opposite sides of the law, manipulated by corrupt economic interests. Peckinpah rewrote the screenplay, establishing Pat Garrett and Billy the Kid as friends, and attempted to weave an epic tragedy from the historical legend. Filmed on location in the Mexican state of Durango, the film starred James Coburn and Kris Kristofferson in the title roles, with a huge supporting cast including Bob Dylan, who composed the film's music, Jason Robards, R. G. Armstrong, Richard Jaeckel, Jack Elam, Chill Wills, Katy Jurado, Matt Clark, L. Q. Jones, Rutanya Alda, Slim Pickens, and Harry Dean Stanton. From the beginning, Peckinpah began to have clashes with MGM and its president James Aubrey, known for his stifling of creative interests and eventual dismantling of the historic movie company. Numerous production difficulties, including an outbreak of influenza and malfunctioning cameras, combined with Peckinpah's alcoholism, resulted in one of the most troubled productions of his career. Principal photography finished 21 days behind schedule and $1.6 million over budget. Enraged, Aubrey severely cut Peckinpah's film from 124 to 106 minutes, resulting in Pat Garrett and Billy the Kid being released in a truncated version largely disowned by cast and crew members. Critics complained that the film was incoherent, and the experience soured Peckinpah forever on Hollywood. In 1988, however, Peckinpah's director's cut was released on video and led to a reevaluation, with many critics hailing it as a mistreated classic and one of the era's best films. Filmmakers, including Martin Scorsese, have praised the film as one of the greatest modern Westerns.

=== Bring Me the Head of Alfredo Garcia ===
In the eyes of his admirers, Bring Me the Head of Alfredo Garcia (1974) was the "last true Peckinpah film." The director himself claimed that it was the only one of his films to be released exactly as he intended it. A project in development for many years and based on an idea by Frank Kowalski, Peckinpah wrote the screenplay with the assistance of Kowalski, Walter Kelley and Gordon Dawson. An alcohol-soaked fever dream involving revenge, greed and murder in the Mexican countryside, the film featured Bennie (Warren Oates) as a thinly disguised self-portrait of Peckinpah, and co-starred a burlap bag containing the severed head of a gigolo being sought by a Mexican patrone for having impregnated his young granddaughter. Bennie is offered a reward of ten thousand dollars for Alfredo's death or proof thereof, and Alfredo's head is demanded as proof the contract has been fulfilled. The macabre drama was part black comedy, action film and tragedy, with a warped edge rarely seen in Peckinpah's works. Most critics were repulsed, and it was listed in the book The 50 Worst Films of All Time by Harry Medved and Randy Dreyfuss. One of the few critics to praise the film was Roger Ebert, and the film's reputation has grown in recent years, with many noting its uncompromising vision as well as its anticipation of the violent black comedy of David Lynch and Quentin Tarantino. A failure at the box office, the film now has a cult following. In 1991, the UCLA film school's festival of great but forgotten American films included Bring Me the Head of Alfredo Garcia. It is reportedly Takeshi Kitano's favorite film.

=== The Killer Elite ===
His career now suffering from consecutive box office failures, Peckinpah once again was in need of a hit on the level of The Getaway. For his next film, he chose The Killer Elite (1975), an action-filled espionage thriller starring James Caan and Robert Duvall as rival American agents. Filmed on location in San Francisco, Peckinpah allegedly discovered cocaine for the first time thanks to Caan and his entourage. This led to increased paranoia and his once legendary dedication to detail deteriorated. Producers also refused to allow Peckinpah to rewrite the screenplay for the first time since his debut film The Deadly Companions. Frustrated, the director spent large amounts of time in his on-location trailer, allowing assistants to direct many scenes. At one point he overdosed on cocaine, ending up in a hospital with a second pacemaker. The film was reasonably successful at the box office, although most critics panned it. Today, the film is considered one of Peckinpah's weakest films, and an example of his decline as a major director.

=== Cross of Iron ===
Still renowned in 1975, Peckinpah was offered the opportunity to direct the eventual blockbusters King Kong (1976) and Superman (1978). He turned down both offers and chose instead the bleak and vivid World War II drama Cross of Iron (1977). The screenplay was based on a novel about a platoon of German soldiers in 1943 on the verge of utter collapse on the Taman Peninsula on the Eastern Front. The German production was filmed in Yugoslavia. Working with James Hamilton and Walter Kelley, Peckinpah rewrote the screenplay and screened numerous Nazi documentaries in preparation. Almost immediately, Peckinpah realized he was working on a low-budget production, as he had to spend $90,000 of his own money to hire experienced crew members. While not suffering from the cocaine abuse which marked The Killer Elite, Peckinpah continued to drink heavily, causing his direction to become confused and erratic. The production abruptly ran out of funds, and Peckinpah was forced to completely improvise the concluding sequence, filming the scene in one day. Co-starring James Mason, Maximilian Schell, David Warner and Senta Berger, Cross of Iron was noted for its opening montage using documentary footage as well as the visceral impact of the unusually intense battle sequences. The film was a huge box office success in Europe, inspiring the sequel Breakthrough starring Richard Burton. Cross of Iron was reportedly a favorite of Orson Welles, who said that after All Quiet on the Western Front it was the finest anti-war film he had ever seen. The film performed poorly in the U.S., ultimately eclipsed by Star Wars, though today it is highly regarded and considered the last instance of Peckinpah's once-great talent.

=== Convoy ===
Hoping to create a blockbuster, Peckinpah decided to take on Convoy (1978). His associates were perplexed, as they felt his choice to direct such substandard material was a result of his renewed cocaine use and continued alcoholism. Based on the hit song by C. W. McCall, the film was an attempt to capitalize on the huge success of Smokey and the Bandit (1977). In spite of his addictions, Peckinpah felt compelled to turn the genre exercise into something more significant. Unhappy with the screenplay written by B. W. L. Norton, Peckinpah tried to encourage the actors to re-write, improvise and ad-lib their dialogue. In another departure from the script, Peckinpah attempted to add a new dimension by casting a pair of black actors as members of the convoy, Madge Sinclair as Widow Woman and Franklyn Ajaye as Spider Mike. Filmed in New Mexico and starring Kris Kristofferson, Ali MacGraw and Ernest Borgnine, Convoy turned out to be yet another troubled Peckinpah production, with the director's health a continuing problem. Friend and actor James Coburn was brought in to serve as second unit director, and he filmed many of the scenes while Peckinpah remained in his on-location trailer. The film wrapped in September 1977, 11 days behind schedule and $5 million over budget. Surprisingly, Convoy was the highest-grossing picture of Peckinpah's career, notching $46.5 million at the box office, but was panned by many critics, leaving his reputation seriously damaged. For the first time in almost a decade, Peckinpah finished a picture and found himself unemployed.

==== 2nd unit work on Jinxed! ====
For the next three years, Peckinpah remained a professional outcast. But during the summer of 1981, his original mentor Don Siegel gave him a chance to return to filmmaking. While shooting Jinxed!, a comedy drama starring Bette Midler and Rip Torn, Siegel asked Peckinpah if he would be interested in directing 12 days of second unit work. Peckinpah immediately accepted, and his earnest collaboration, while uncredited, was noted within the industry. For the final time, Peckinpah found himself back in the directing business.

=== The Osterman Weekend ===
By 1982, Peckinpah's health was poor. Producers Peter S. Davis and William N. Panzer were undaunted, as they felt that having Peckinpah's name attached to The Osterman Weekend (1983) would lend the suspense thriller an air of respectability. Peckinpah accepted the job but reportedly hated the convoluted screenplay based upon Robert Ludlum's novel, which he also disliked. Multiple actors in Hollywood auditioned for the film, intrigued by the opportunity. Many of those who signed on, including John Hurt, Burt Lancaster and Dennis Hopper, did so for less than their usual salaries for a chance to work with the legendary director. By the time shooting wrapped in January 1983 in Los Angeles, Peckinpah and the producers were hardly speaking. Nevertheless, Peckinpah brought the film in on time and on budget, delivering his director's cut to the producers. Davis and Panzer were unhappy with Peckinpah's version, which included an opening sequence of two characters making love. The producers changed the opening and also deleted other scenes they deemed unnecessary. Peckinpah's final film was critically panned. It grossed $6.5 million in the United States (nearly recouping its budget) and did well in Europe and on the new home-video market.

==== Julian Lennon music videos ====
Peckinpah's last work as a filmmaker was undertaken two months before his death. He was hired by producer Martin Lewis to shoot two music videos featuring Julian Lennon—"Valotte" and "Too Late For Goodbyes." The critically acclaimed videos led to Lennon's nomination for Best New Video Artist at the 1985 MTV Video Music Awards.

== Reception and commentary ==
Pauline Kael, a critic for The New Yorker, was a fan of Peckinpah's but gave insight into his career when she wrote: "With his history of butchered films and films released without publicity or being fired and blacklisted for insubordination, of getting ornerier and ornerier, Peckinpah has lost a lot of blood." She goes on to describe his work: "He doesn't do the expected, and so, scene by scene, he creates his own actor-director's suspense."

== Documentaries ==
- Peckinpah has been the subject of four documentaries; the BBC production Sam Peckinpah: Man of Iron (1992), directed by Paul Joyce; Sam Peckinpah's West: Legacy of a Hollywood Renegade (1994); The Wild Bunch: An Album in Montage (1996), directed by Paul Seydor; and the TCM production Peckinpah Suite (2019), which focused on Peckinpah's daughter, Lupita Peckinpah. The Wild Bunch: An Album in Montage was nominated for an Academy Award as Best Documentary Short Subject.
- Over a 4-year period German film maker Mike Siegel produced and directed Passion & Poetry – The Ballad of Sam Peckinpah a two-hour long film about Sam Peckinpah which includes rare Peckinpah interviews and statements. In 2009 the two-disc special edition with a running time of 270 minutes was released on DVD.

== In popular culture ==
- John Belushi portrayed Peckinpah as a deranged lunatic who directs his first romantic comedy, by beating up his leading lady in the fifth episode of the first season of Saturday Night Live.
- Peckinpah's use of violence was parodied by Monty Python in Sam Peckinpah's "Salad Days", in which a lovely day out for an upper-class English family turns into a blood-soaked orgy of severed limbs and gushing wounds. Peckinpah reportedly liked the sketch and enjoyed showing it to friends and family.
- Peckinpah's penchant for filming action scenes in slow motion was satirized by UK comedian Benny Hill, playing a milkman in a Western skit called "The Deputy" that first aired on his March 29, 1973, special. In one scene, Hill's titular character shoots one of the villains (Bob Todd), who then proceeds to pirouette in extremely slow motion before collapsing.
- Various Peckinpah films are parodied in Jim Reardon's student film Bring Me the Head of Charlie Brown.
- In the John Waters film Cecil B. Demented (2000), several characters have the names of legendary film directors tattooed on their bodies. One of the characters has "Sam Peckinpah" tattooed on his arm.
- Kris Kristofferson recorded "Sam's Song (Ask Any Working Girl)", a brief tribute to the director, for his 1995 release A Moment of Forever.
- In his 1993 song and short film Asshole, Denis Leary references director Sam Peckinpah by name in a surreal list of hypermasculine American icons.

== Filmography ==
=== Film ===
Year	Title	Functioned as		Notes
Year	Title	Director	Writer	Notes
1961	The Deadly Companions	Yes	No	
1962	Ride the High Country	Yes	Uncredited	
1965	Major Dundee	Yes	Yes	
1969	The Wild Bunch	Yes	Yes	
1970	The Ballad of Cable Hogue	Yes	No	Also producer
1971	Straw Dogs	Yes	Yes	
1972	Junior Bonner	Yes	No	
1972	The Getaway	Yes	No	
1973	Pat Garrett and Billy the Kid	Yes	No	
1974	Bring Me the Head of Alfredo Garcia	Yes	Yes	
1975	The Killer Elite	Yes	No	
1977	Cross of Iron	Yes	No	
1978	Convoy	Yes	No	
1983	The Osterman Weekend	Yes	No	

==== Writer only ====
Year	Title	Director	Notes
1961	One-Eyed Jacks	Marlon Brando	Uncredited
1965	The Glory Guys	Arnold Laven	
1968	Villa Rides	Buzz Kulik	Co-writer with Robert Towne

==== Other production credits ====
Year	Title	Director	Contribution	Notes
1954	Riot in Cell Block 11	Don Siegel	Production Assistant	Uncredited
1954	Private Hell 36	Don Siegel	Dialogue Director	Credited as 'David Peckinpah'
1955	Dial Red O	Daniel B. Ullman	Dialogue Coach	
1955	The Blue and the Gold	Don Siegel	Dialogue Coach	Uncredited
1956	World Without End	Edward Bernds	Dialogue Coach	Uncredited
1956	Crime in the Streets	Don Siegel	Dialogue Director	Credited as 'David S. Peckinpah'
1982	Jinxed!	Don Siegel	2nd Unit Director	Uncredited

==== Acting roles ====
Year	Title	Role	Notes
1955	Dial Red O	Cook in Diner	Uncredited
1955	The Blue and the Gold	Pilot	Uncredited
1955	Wichita	Bank Teller	Uncredited
1956	Invasion of the Body Snatchers	Charlie	
1957	Last of the Badmen	Townsman	Credited as 'David Samuel Peckinpah'
1972	Junior Bonner	Man in Palace Bar	Uncredited
1973	Pat Garrett and Billy the Kid	Will	Uncredited
1978	China 9, Liberty 37	Wilbur Olsen	
1978	Convoy	TV Reporter	Uncredited
1979	The Visitor	Dr. Sam Collins	
1983	The Osterman Weekend	Danforth's Aide	Uncredited

=== Television ===
Year	Title	Functioned as			Notes
Year	Title	Director	Writer	Creator	Notes
1955–1958	Gunsmoke	No	Yes	No	11 episodes
1956–1958	Broken Arrow	Yes	Yes	No	Director; 1 episode Writer; 3 episodes
1958	Have Gun – Will Travel	No	Yes	No	Episode: "The Singer"
1958	Man Without a Gun	No	Yes	No	Episode: "The Kidder"
1958–1959	The Rifleman	Yes	Yes	Uncredited	Director; 4 episodes Writer; 6 episodes
1959–1960	Zane Grey Theater	Yes	Yes	No	3 episodes
1960	Pony Express	No	Yes	No	Episode: "The Story of Julesberg"
1960	Klondike	No	Yes	No	2 episodes
1960	The Westerner	Yes	Yes	Yes	Director; 5 episodes Writer; 5 episodes Also producer; 13 episodes
1961	Route 66	No	Yes	No	Episode: "Mon Petit Chou"
1962–1963	The Dick Powell Show	Yes	Yes	No	2 episodes Also producer; 2 episodes
1966	ABC Stage 67	Yes	Yes	No	Episode: "Noon Wine"
1967	Bob Hope Presents the Chrysler Theatre	Yes	No	No	Episode: "That Lady Is My Wife"

=== Music videos ===
Year	Title	Artist
1984	"Valotte"	Julian Lennon
1984	"Too Late for Goodbyes"	Julian Lennon

== Awards and nominations ==
Institution	Year	Category	Work	Result
Academy Awards	1970	Best Original Screenplay	The Wild Bunch	Nominated
Directors Guild of America	1967	Outstanding Directorial Achievement in Television	ABC Stage 67 ("Noon Wine")	Nominated
Directors Guild of America	1970	Outstanding Directorial Achievement in Theatrical Feature Film	The Wild Bunch	Nominated
Festival du Film Policier de Cognac	1984	Special Jury Prize	The Osterman Weekend	Won
Festival du Film Policier de Cognac	1984	TF1 Special Award	The Osterman Weekend	Won
Kansas City Film Critics Circle	1971	Best Director	Straw Dogs	Won
San Sebastián International Film Festival	1972	Golden Shell	Junior Bonner	Nominated
Writers Guild of America	1957	Best Written Episodic Drama, 30 Minutes in Length	Gunsmoke ("The Guitar")	Nominated
Writers Guild of America	1968	Best Written Dramatic Anthology	ABC Stage 67 ("Noon Wine")	Nominated
