= Ride the High Country =

1962 film by Sam Peckinpah

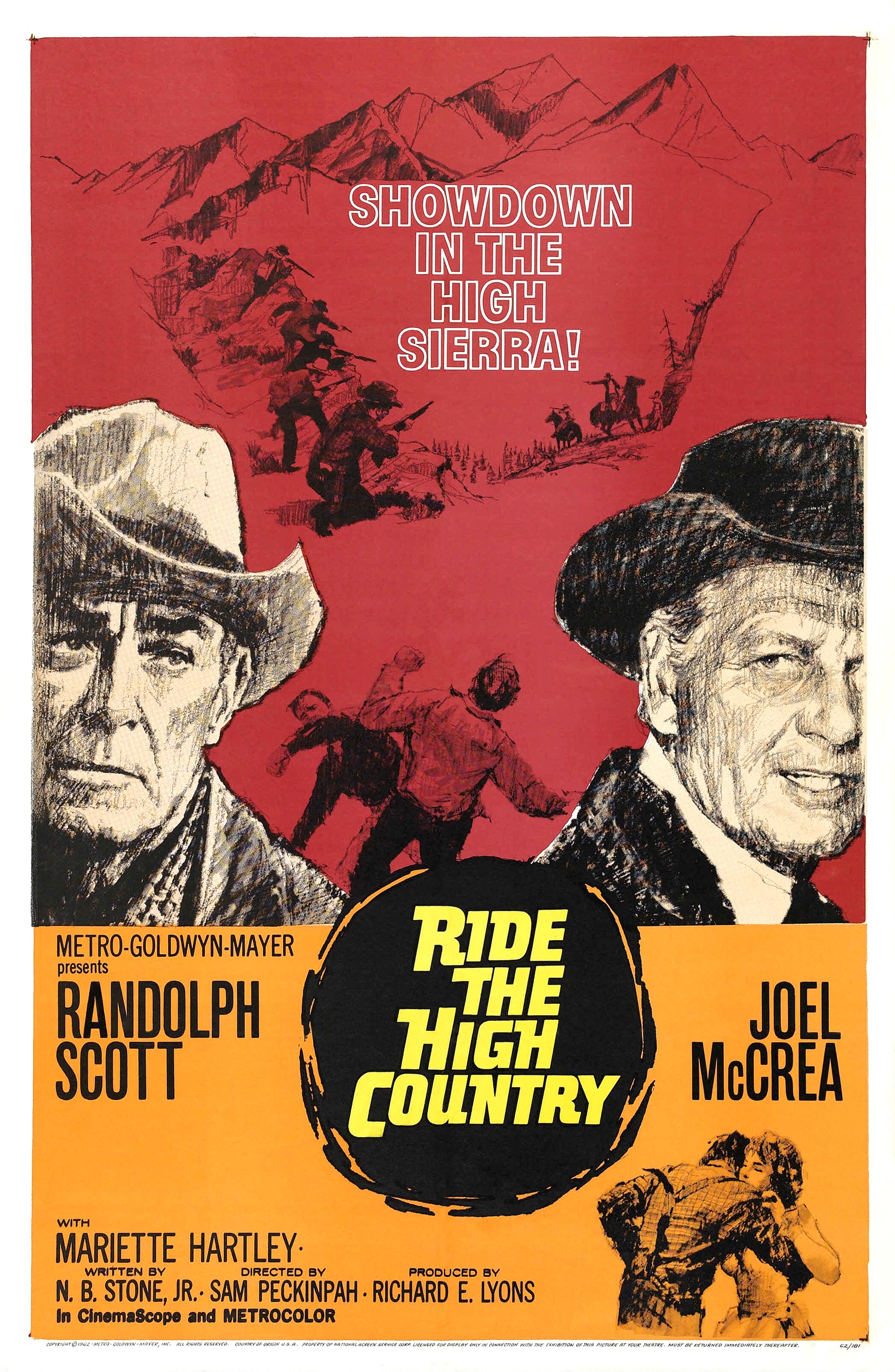
- Theatrical release poster
- Directed by: Sam Peckinpah
- Written by: N.B. Stone Jr. Uncredited: Sam Peckinpah; William Roberts
- Produced by: Richard E. Lyons
- Starring: Randolph Scott; Joel McCrea; Mariette Hartley
- Cinematography: Lucien Ballard
- Edited by: Frank Santillo
- Music by: George Bassman
- Production company: Metro-Goldwyn-Mayer
- Distributed by: Metro-Goldwyn-Mayer
- Release date: June 20, 1962
- Running time: 94 minutes
- Country: United States
- Language: English
- Budget: $813,000
- Box office: $2 million

Ride the High Country (released internationally as Guns in the Afternoon) is a 1962 American Western film directed by Sam Peckinpah and starring Randolph Scott (in his final screen performance), Joel McCrea, and Mariette Hartley. The supporting cast includes Edgar Buchanan, James Drury, R. G. Armstrong, L. Q. Jones, and Warren Oates.

The film was released by Metro-Goldwyn-Mayer on June 20, 1962. Despite a poor box-office reception, it was praised and well-regarded by critics, winning the Belgian Film Critics Association's 1964 Grand Prix. Hartley was nominated for a BAFTA Award for Most Promising Newcomer to Leading Film Roles. The film's reputation has only grown in following years, with Peckinpah's admirers citing it as his first great film.

In 1992, Ride the High Country was selected for preservation in the National Film Registry by the United States Library of Congress as being deemed "culturally, historically, or aesthetically significant.

== Plot ==
In the early 20th century, aging ex-lawman Steve Judd is hired by a bank to transport gold from a high country mining camp to the town of Hornitos. Six miners were recently murdered trying to transport a gold shipment. Judd was once respected, but his threadbare clothes and spectacles show that he is long past his prime. He enlists his old friend and partner Gil Westrum to guard the gold transfer. Gil, who makes his living claiming to be a legendary sharpshooter named the Oregon Kid, recruits his young sidekick, Heck Longtree.

The three men ride toward Coarsegold, the mining camp. Judd does not realize that Gil and Heck plan to steal the gold. They stop for the night at the farm of Joshua Knudsen and his daughter Elsa. Knudsen is a domineering religious man, who warns against those who "traffic in gold" and trades Bible verses with Judd at the dinner table. That night, Elsa and Heck secretly meet in the moonlight for conversation, but Knudsen catches them and pulls her away. Back at the house, he admonishes and slaps her.

The next morning, after the three men have left, she catches up and asks to ride with them. She is also going to Coarsegold, to marry a miner named Billy Hammond. Along the way, Elsa and Heck flirt, and at one time, he tries to force himself on her. Heck is stopped by Judd and then punched by both Judd and Gil. He later apologizes to Elsa.

When they reach Coarsegold, the two older men set up a tent to weigh and accept gold dust. Elsa and Billy are married in the camp's brothel—the only substantial building there—by the retired Judge Tolliver. Billy forces Elsa to a room in the brothel for their wedding night and strikes her when she resists. Dead drunk, he fails to prevent his brothers Elder, Sylvus, Jimmy, and Henry from entering the room and attempting to rape her. Hearing her screams, Judd and Heck rescue Elsa and let her stay in their tent overnight.

The next day, the miners of the camp organize an extrajudicial "miner's trial" to make the outsiders return Elsa to her "legal" husband; because they are outnumbered, Judd agrees to the miners' demands. However, Gil rouses the drunken Tolliver, demands to see his license, then keeps it. He forces Tolliver at gunpoint to agree that when asked if he has a license to marry, he must say no (because Gil has it). The ruse works and the three men leave the camp with the gold and Elsa.

Along the way, Judd says to Gil that right and wrong are "something you just know". After all his years working in disreputable places, he tells Gil that he is grateful to have regained some of his self-respect. Realizing Judd will never agree to steal the gold, Gil plans to take it without his help. That night, as Gil and Heck prepare to leave with the gold, Judd confronts them at gunpoint. Heck gives up his gun immediately. Angered by Gil's betrayal, Judd puts his gun away, then slaps Gil and challenges him to draw. Instead, Gil throws down his guns and accepts that Judd will turn him in when they return to town. Judd has to change his plans when the Hammonds appear looking for Elsa. They found out about the ruse and know that the marriage is legal. In the ensuing gunfight, Jimmy and Sylvus are killed, and Billy, Elder, and Henry give up and escape.

During the night, Gil returns to the site of the gunfight, where he takes a horse and gun from one of the dead brothers. Then, he follows Judd, Heck, and Elsa. Heck has shown himself to be trustworthy, and although he will probably go to prison, Elsa tells him she will be there when he gets out. When they reach Elsa's farm, the Hammonds are waiting, having already killed her father. A gunfight breaks out and both Judd and Heck are wounded. Gil rides in to help his old friend, and together the pair challenge the brothers to a face-to-face shootout. When the dust settles, the Hammonds are dead, but Judd is mortally wounded. After forgiving Gil, Judd casts a look back towards the high country, then dies.

== Cast ==
- Randolph Scott as Gil Westrum
- Joel McCrea as Steve Judd
- Mariette Hartley as Elsa Knudsen
- Ron Starr as Heck Longtree
- Edgar Buchanan as Judge Tolliver
- R. G. Armstrong as Joshua Knudsen
- Jenie Jackson as Kate
- James Drury as Billy Hammond
- L. Q. Jones as Sylvus Hammond
- John Anderson as Elder Hammond
- John Davis Chandler as Jimmy Hammond
- Warren Oates as Henry Hammond

Uncredited

- Byron Foulger as Abner Sampson
- Percy Helton as Luther Sampson
- Don Brodie as Spieler

== Production ==
=== Development and writing ===
The script, originally called Guns in the Afternoon, was written by N.B. Stone, Jr. Producer Richard E. Lyons was looking for a Western at MGM and William S. Roberts remembered Stone's script. Lyons liked the story, but had Roberts rewrite the script, as Stone refused to do so. Lyons then signed Randolph Scott and Joel McCrea to star. He was looking for a director, and impressed by episodes of The Westerner, signed Sam Peckinpah. Peckinpah also rewrote the script.

According to Lyons, the final script was almost entirely the work of Roberts and Peckinpah. As he explained to Peckinpah biographer Garner Simmons:

The way it came about was one day I happened to mention my need for a good property to Roberts, who told me about this good friend of his, N.B. Stone, Jr., who had this screenplay he'd written years before about two old guys who were through but got one more chance in life. Well, it sounded like a pretty good idea, and Roberts put me in touch with Stone.

What Roberts had neglected to mention was that his friend's chronic alcoholism had brought his career to a standstill. The 145-page draft eventually obtained from Stone was, in Lyon's word, "awful." Apprised of the situation, Roberts offered to do a full rewrite, though he insisted on remaining uncredited, still hoping to give his friend's career a boost. The rewrite was completed, and though deemed an enormous improvement, it remained, in Lyon's words, "a diamond in the rough." Thankfully, Peckinpah "knew how to cut it to really bring out its brilliance":

What Sam did was a tremendous three- to four-week dialogue rewrite. And he made possibly the single most important structural change. In the original Stone-Roberts script, Randy, the 'black hat' character, dies at the end. Sam switched it so the good guy died. And that, I think, really gave the film its tremendous impact, because it went against the tradition of the bad guy paying his debt.

The film's title itself – as opposed to the original Guns in the Afternoon – was also Peckinpah's handiwork. The significance of Peckinpah's contribution was not lost on the film's star. "Sam was such a good writer," recalled McCrea. "He improved the script immeasurably."

=== Casting ===
The original casting was for McCrea to play the Gil Westrum part and Randolph Scott to play Steve Judd. After reading the script, the two men agreed that a switch of roles was in order. The film featured Scott's final screen performance. After this film, Joel McCrea did not make another feature film until 1970's Cry Blood, Apache, with his son Jody.

The part of Billy Hammond was originally offered to Robert Culp, who turned it down.

Peckinpah flipped a coin in the presence of a producer to see which leading man got top billing, Scott or McCrea. Scott won the toss. However, in the opening credits, both stars' names are shown in the same shot, so both Scott and McCrea received equal top billing.

Filming began in October 1961.

=== Filming locations ===
- 20th Century Fox Movie Ranch, Malibu Creek State Park, 1925 Las Virgenes Road, Calabasas, California
- Bronson Canyon, Griffith Park, 4730 Crystal Springs Drive, Los Angeles, California
- Inyo National Forest, 351 Pacu Lane, Bishop, California
- Mammoth Lakes, California
- Merrimac, California

== Release ==
The film was released on the bottom half of a double bill with The Tartars. William Goldman says he spoke to an MGM executive at the time, who says the film had tested strongly, but they felt the film "didn't cost enough to be that good".

=== Home media ===
Ride the High Country was released on Blu-ray via the Warner Archive Collection on August 4, 2017.

== Reception ==
=== Box office ===
According to MGM records, the film lost $160,000.

=== Critical response ===
Seeing it as half of a double bill, Bosley Crowther greatly preferred Ride the High Country, calling it a "perfectly dandy little Western" and "the most disarming little horse opera in months." According to Crowther:

The two young people are quite good, especially Miss Hartley, a newcomer with real promise. R. G. Armstrong and Edgar Buchanan also contribute telling bits. We know little about the director and scenarist, but Mr. Peckinpah and Mr. Stone certainly have what it takes. And so, if anybody ever doubted it, do a couple of leathery, graying hombres named McCrea and Scott.

Ride the High Country was hailed as a success upon its release in Europe. The film's reputation has only grown in following years, with Peckinpah's admirers citing it as his first great film. They also note that all of the themes of Peckinpah's later films, such as honor and ideals compromised by circumstance, the difficulty of doing right in an unjust world, the destruction of the West and its heroes by industrial modernity, and the importance of loyalty between men are all present in Ride the High Country. In 1964, the film won the prestigious Grand Prix of the Belgian Film Critics Association.

Charlton Heston was an admirer of the film and subsequently approached Sam Peckinpah with the script for Major Dundee (1965). In his autobiography In the Arena (1995), Heston wrote that he was considering remaking the film in the late 1980s, presumably with Clint Eastwood as a co-star.

=== Awards and nominations ===
Institution	Year	Category	Nominee	Result	Ref.
Belgian Film Critics Association	1964	Grand Prix	—N/a	Won	
British Academy Film Awards	1963	Most Promising Newcomer to Leading Film Roles	Mariette Hartley	Nominated	

=== Recognition ===
The film is recognized by American Film Institute in 2008 in AFI's 10 Top 10: Nominated Western Film

== Preservation ==
Ride the High Country was selected for preservation in the U.S. Library of Congress's National Film Registry in 1992.

== Bibliography ==
- Goldman, William (2000). "The Voice of the Turtles". The Big Picture: Who Killed Hollywood? and Other Essays. New York; London: Applause Books. pp. 23–30. ISBN 1557834067.
