= African Queen =

African Queen or The African Queen may refer to:

== Vessels ==
- African Queen (boat), the vessel used in the 1951 film The African Queen
- African Queen (1787 ship)
- African Queen (1792 ship)
- African Queen (1797 ship)

== Film and literature ==
- The African Queen (novel), a 1935 novel by C. S. Forester
- The African Queen, a 1951 film adaptation starring Humphrey Bogart and Katharine Hepburn
- The African Queen (1977 film), a television sequel to the 1951 film, starring Warren Oates and Mariette Hartley

== Music ==
- African Queen (album), a 2021 album by Makhadzi
- African Queens (album), an album by the Ritchie Family
- "African Queen" (song), a 2004 song by 2face Idibia
- African Queen, a 1981 album and song by Belgian pop group Allez Allez
- "African Queen", a version of Billy Ocean's 1984 song "Caribbean Queen"

== Other uses ==
- African Queens, a 2023 docudrama series
- African Queen, a cultivar of Osteospermum, a member of the sunflower family
