= Peter Fonda filmography =

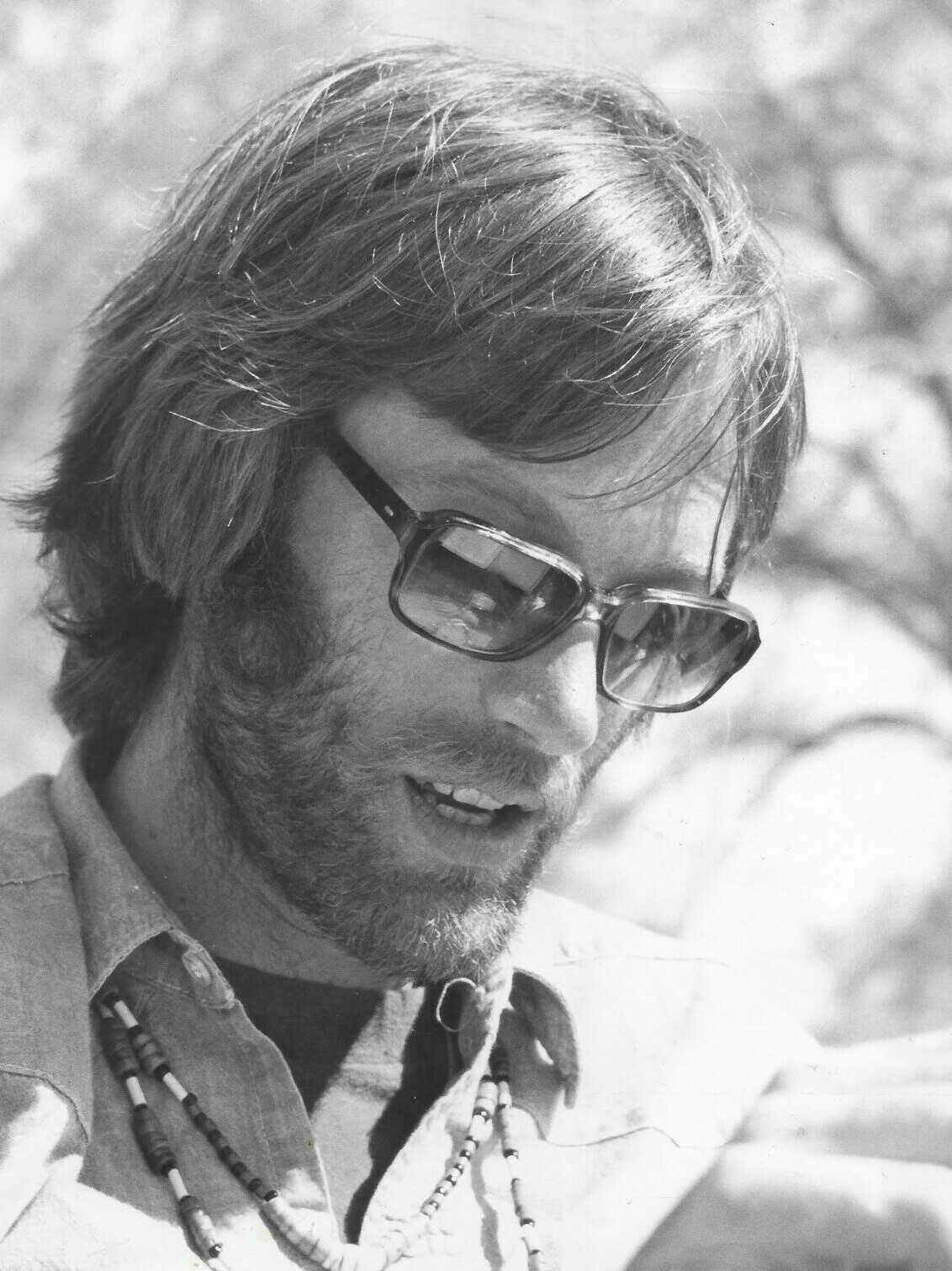
Fonda in 1970

The following is the complete filmography of American actor Peter Fonda.

== Film ==
Year	Title	Role	Notes
1963	Tammy and the Doctor	Dr. Mark Cheswick	
1963	The Victors	Weaver	Nominated—Golden Globe Award for New Star of the Year – Actor
1964	Lilith	Stephen Evshevsky	
1964	The Young Lovers	Eddie Slocum	
1965	The Rounders	Unknown	Uncredited
1966	The Wild Angels	'Heavenly Blues'	
1967	The Trip	Paul Groves	
1968	Spirits of the Dead	Baron Wilhelm	(segment "Metzengerstein")
1969	Easy Rider	Wyatt	Also writer and producer Nominated — Academy Award for Best Original Screenplay; Nominated — Writers Guild of America Award for Best Drama Written Directly for the Screen (both shared with Dennis Hopper and Terry Southern)
1971	The Hired Hand	Harry Collings	Also director
1971	The Last Movie	Young Sheriff	
1973	Idaho Transfer	—N/a	Director
1973	Two People	Evan Bonner	
1974	Dirty Mary, Crazy Larry	Larry Rayder	
1974	Open Season	Ken	
1975	Race with the Devil	Roger March	
1975	92 in the Shade	Tom Skelton	
1976	Killer Force	Mike Bradley	
1976	Fighting Mad	Tom Hunter	
1976	Futureworld	Chuck Browning	
1977	Outlaw Blues	Bobby Ogden	
1978	High-Ballin'	Rane	
1979	Wanda Nevada	Beaudray Demerille	Also director
1981	The Cannonball Run	Chief Biker	Cameo
1982	Split Image	Kirklander	
1983	Daijôbu, mai furendo	'Gonzy' Traumerai	
1983	Dance of the Dwarfs	Harry Bediker	
1983	Peppermint Peace	Mr. Freedom	
1983	Spasms	Dr. Tom Brazilian	
1985	Certain Fury	Rodney	
1988	Mercenary Fighters	Virelli	
1988	Hawken's Breed	Hawken	
1989	The Rose Garden	Herbert Schlüter	
1990	Enemy	Ken Andrews	Also writer
1991	Family Express	Nick	
1993	Bodies, Rest & Motion	Motorcycle Rider	
1993	South Beach	Jake	
1993	Deadfall	Pete	
1994	Molly & Gina	Larry Stanton	
1994	Love and a .45	Vergil Cheatham	
1994	Nadja	Dracula / Dr. Van Helsing	
1996	Escape from L.A.	'Pipeline'	
1996	Grace of My Heart	Guru Dave	Voice
1997	Ulee's Gold	Ulysses 'Ulee' Jackson	Golden Globe Award for Best Actor – Motion Picture Drama; New York Film Critics Circle Award for Best Actor; Dallas–Fort Worth Film Critics Association Award for Best Actor; Southeastern Film Critics Association Award for Best Actor; Nominated — Academy Award for Best Actor; Nominated — Screen Actors Guild Award for Outstanding Performance by a Male Actor in a Leading Role; Nominated — Independent Spirit Award for Best Male Lead; Nominated — National Society of Film Critics Award for Best Actor (2nd place); Nominated — Chicago Film Critics Association Award for Best Actor; Nominated — Online Film Critics Society Award for Best Actor
1997	Painted Hero	Ray, The Cook	
1998	Welcome to Hollywood	Himself	
1999	The Limey	Terry Valentine	
2000	South of Heaven, West of Hell	Bill 'Shoshonee Bill'	
2000	Thomas and the Magic Railroad	Burnett Stone	
2000	Second Skin	Mervyn 'Merv' Gutman	
2001	Wooly Boys	A.J. 'Stoney' Stoneman	
2004	The Heart Is Deceitful Above All Things	Grandfather	
2004	Ocean's Twelve	Bobby Caldwell	Deleted scene
2006	In God We Trust	Millionaire	
2007	Ghost Rider	Mephistopheles	
2007	Wild Hogs	Damien Blade	
2007	3:10 to Yuma	Byron McElroy	Nominated—Screen Actors Guild Award for Outstanding Performance by a Cast in a Motion Picture
2008	Japan	Alfred	
2009	The Perfect Age of Rock 'n' Roll	August West	
2009	The Boondock Saints II: All Saints Day	Louie 'The Roman' Romano	
2011	The Trouble with Bliss	Seymour Bliss	
2012	Smitty	Jack	
2012	Harodim	Solomon Fell	
2013	As Cool as I Am	Gerald	
2013	Copperhead	Avery	
2013	The Ultimate Life	Jacob Early	
2013	The Harvest	Grandfather	
2013	House of Bodies	Henry Lee Bishop	
2015	Jesse James Lawman	Mayor	
2015	The Runner	Rayne Pryce	
2017	The Ballad of Lefty Brown	Edward Johnson	
2017	The Most Hated Woman in America	Reverend Harrington	
2018	You Can't Say No	Buck Murphy	
2018	Boundaries	Joey	
2019	The Last Full Measure	Jimmy Burr	Posthumous release
2023	The Magic Hours	Norman Bettinger	Posthumous release; Final film role

== Television ==
Year	Title	Role	Notes
1962	Naked City	Jody Selkin	Episode: "The Night the Saints Lost Their Halos"
1962	The New Breed	Ronnie Bryson	Episode: "Thousands and Thousands of Miles"
1962	Wagon Train	Orly French	Episode: "The Orly French Story"
1962–1985	The Tonight Show Starring Johnny Carson	Himself	11 episodes
1963	The Defenders	Gary Foster	Episode: "The Brother Killers"
1963	Channing	Unknown	Episode: "An Obelisk for Benny"
1964	Arrest and Trial	Alex Bakalyan	Episode: "A Circle of Strangers"
1964	The Alfred Hitchcock Hour	Virgil 'Verge' Likens	Episode: "The Return of Verge Likens"
1964	Twelve O'Clock High	Lieutenant Andy Lathrop	Episode: "The Sound of Distant Thunder"
1966	Insight	Unknown	Episode: "Politics Can Become a Habit"
1966	What's My Line?	Himself / Mystery Guest	1 episode
1966–1970	The Merv Griffin Show	Himself	3 episodes
1967–1968	Personality	Himself	4 episodes
1967–1969	The Joey Bishop Show	Himself	2 episodes
1968	Certain Honorable Men	Robbie Conroy	TV film
1968	The Red Skelton Show	Robinson Crusoe	Season 18, Episode 12: "Two on the Isle"
1969–1980	The Mike Douglas Show	Himself	4 episodes
1970	The Dick Cavett Show	Himself	1 episode
1980	The Hostage Tower	Mike Graham	TV film
1981–1982	Fridays	Himself	2 episodes
1985	A Reason to Live	Gus Stewart	TV film
1988	Sound	Roberto Lovari	TV miniseries
1988	A Time of Indifference	Leo	TV miniseries
1994	In the Heat of the Night	Marcantony Appfel	2 episodes
1994–1998	Late Night with Conan O'Brien	Himself	2 episodes
1996	Don't Look Back	'Mouse'	TV film
1996	Jeremy Clarkson's Motorworld	Himself	Season 2, Episode 3: "Switzerland"
1997	The Tonight Show with Jay Leno	Himself	1 episode
1997	Space Ghost Coast to Coast	Himself	2 episodes
1997–1999	Late Show with David Letterman	Himself	3 episodes
1997–2004	Biography	Himself	5 episodes
1998	The Tempest	Gideon Prosper	TV film
1998	The Rosie O'Donnell Show	Himself	1 episode
1999	The Passion of Ayn Rand	Frank O'Connor	TV film Golden Globe Award for Best Supporting Actor – Series, Miniseries or Television Film; Nominated — Primetime Emmy Award for Outstanding Supporting Actor in a Miniseries or a Movie; Nominated — Screen Actors Guild Award for Outstanding Performance by a Male Actor in a Miniseries or Television Movie
1999	The Late Late Show with Craig Kilborn	Himself	1 episode
2002	The Laramie Project	Dr. Cantway	TV film
2003	The Maldanodo Miracle	Father Russell	TV film
2004	Capital City	President Bridgewater	TV film
2004	A Thief of Time	Harrison Houk	TV film
2004	Back When We Were Grownups	Dr. Will Allenby	TV film
2005	Supernova	Dr. Austin Shepard	TV film
2007	The Gathering	Thomas Carrier	2 episodes
2007	ER	Pierce Tanner	Episode: "300 Patients"
2008	Journey to the Center of the Earth	Edward	TV film
2009	Revolution	Lawrence Fortis	TV film
2009	Californication	Himself	Episode: "So Here's the Thing ..."
2009	The One Show	Himself	1 episode
2010	Tavis Smiley	Himself	1 episode
2011	CSI: NY	William Hunt	2 episodes
2011	Hawaii Five-0	Jesse Billings	Episode: "Mea Makamae"
2011	The Great Ride	Himself	5 episodes
2014	HR	Jonathan Quaff	TV film
2014	The Blacklist	Geoff Pearl	Episode: "The Mombasa Cartel"
2016	Documentary Now!	Peter Fonda	Episode: "Mr. Runner Up: My Life as an Oscar Bridesmaid"
2016	Ride with Norman Reedus	Himself	Season 1, Episode 6: "The Keys with Peter Fonda"
2017	Made in Hollywood	Himself	1 episode
2017–2018	Milo Murphy's Law	Director	Voice, 2 episodes
2019	1969	Himself	Season 1, Episode 6: "Fortunate Sons"

== Video games ==
Year	Title	Voice role	Notes
2004	Grand Theft Auto: San Andreas	"The Truth"	
2021	Grand Theft Auto: The Trilogy - The Definitive Edition	"The Truth"	Archival recordings Remaster of Grand Theft Auto: San Andreas only
