= Harry Dean Stanton filmography =

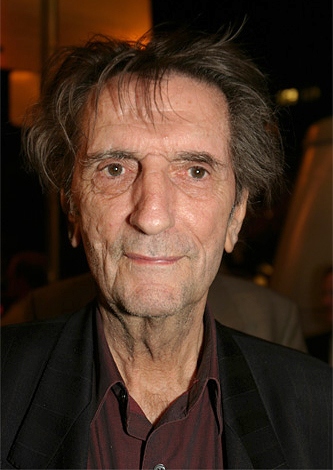
Stanton in 2006

The following is the complete filmography of American actor Harry Dean Stanton (July 14, 1926 – September 15, 2017).

== Film ==
Year	Title	Role	Notes
1956	The Wrong Man	The Department of Corrections Employee	Uncredited
1957	Revolt at Fort Laramie	Rinty	Uncredited
1957	Tomahawk Trail	Private Miller	Credited as Dean Stanton
1958	The Proud Rebel	Jeb Burleigh	Credited as Dean Stanton
1958	Voice in the Mirror	Hysterical Patient In Psychiatric Ward	Uncredited
1959	Pork Chop Hill	U.S. Soldier With BAR	Uncredited
1959	The Jayhawkers!	Deputy Smallwood	Uncredited
1959	A Dog's Best Friend	Roy Janney	Credited as Dean Stanton
1960	The Adventures of Huckleberry Finn	The Slave Catcher	Credited as Dean Stanton
1962	Hero's Island	"Dixey" Gates	Credited as Dean Stanton
1962	How the West Was Won	Gant Henchman	Uncredited
1963	The Man from the Diners' Club	Poetry-Reciting Beatnik	Uncredited
1966	Ride in the Whirlwind	Dick "Blind Dick"	Credited as Dean Stanton
1967	A Time for Killing	Sergeant Dan Way	Credited as Dean Stanton
1967	The Hostage	Eddie	Credited as Dean Stanton
1967	Cool Hand Luke	"Tramp"	Credited as Dean Stanton
1968	Day of the Evil Gun	Sergeant Parker	Credited as Dean Stanton
1968	The Mini-Skirt Mob	"Spook"	
1969	Lanton Mills	Lanton	Short film
1970	The Rebel Rousers	Randolph Halverson	Credited as Dean Stanton
1970	Kelly's Heroes	Private Willard	Credited as Dean Stanton
1971	Two-Lane Blacktop	Oklahoma Hitchhiker	Credited as Dean Stanton
1971	What's the Matter with Helen?	Malcolm Hays	
1972	Cisco Pike	Jesse Dupre	Credited as H.D. Stanton
1972	Cry for Me, Billy	Luke Todd	
1973	Pat Garrett & Billy the Kid	Luke	
1973	Dillinger	Homer Van Meter	
1974	Where the Lilies Bloom	Kiser Pease	
1974	Zandy's Bride	Songer	
1974	Cockfighter	Jack Burke	
1974	Win, Place or Steal	Jack	
1974	The Godfather Part II	F.B.I. Man #1	
1975	Rafferty and the Gold Dust Twins	Billy Winston	
1975	Rancho Deluxe	Curt	
1975	The Fortune	Prisoner In Holding Cell	Uncredited
1975	Farewell, My Lovely	Detective Billy Rolfe	
1975	92 in the Shade	Carter	
1976	The Missouri Breaks	Calvin	
1978	Renaldo and Clara	Lafkezio	
1978	Straight Time	Jerry Schue	
1978	Up in Smoke	Police Officer	Scenes deleted
1979	Wise Blood	Asa Hawks	
1979	Alien	Samuel Brett	DVDX Award for Best Audio Commentary (New for DVD)
1979	The Rose	Billy Ray	
1980	Death Watch	Vincent Ferriman	
1980	The Black Marble	Philo Skinner	
1980	Private Benjamin	First Sergeant Jim Ballard	
1981	Escape from New York	Harold "Brain" Hellman	
1982	One from the Heart	Moe	
1982	Young Doctors in Love	Dr. Oliver Ludwig	
1983	Christine	Detective Rudy Junkins	
1984	Repo Man	Bud	
1984	Paris, Texas	Travis Henderson	
1984	The Bear	Coach Thomas	
1984	Red Dawn	Tom Eckert	
1985	The Care Bears Movie	Brave Heart Lion	Singing voice
1985	UFOria	Brother Bud Sanders	
1985	One Magic Christmas	Gideon	
1985	Fool for Love	Old Man	
1986	Pretty in Pink	Jack Walsh	
1987	Slam Dance	Detective Benjamin Smiley	
1988	Stars and Bars	Loomis Gage	
1988	Mr. North	Henry Simmons	
1988	The Last Temptation of Christ	Saul / Paul of Tarsus	
1989	Dream a Little Dream	Ike Baker	
1989	Twister	Eugene Cleveland	
1990	The Fourth War	General Hackworth	
1990	Wild at Heart	Johnnie Farragut	
1990	Stranger in the House		
1992	Twin Peaks: Fire Walk with Me	Carl Rodd	
1992	Man Trouble	Redmond Layls	
1992	Cruise Control	Roland	Short film
1994	Blue Tiger	Smith	
1995	One Hundred and One Nights	Hollywood Actor	Uncredited
1995	Never Talk to Strangers	Max Cheski	
1996	Playback	Ernie Fontenot	
1996	Down Periscope	Howard	
1997	Midnight Blue	Eric	
1997	She's So Lovely	Tony "Shorty" Russo	
1997	Fire Down Below	Harry "Cotton Harry"	
1998	The Mighty	Elton "Grim" Pinneman	
1998	Fear and Loathing in Las Vegas	The Judge	
1998	A Civil Action	The Land Watcher	Uncredited
1998	Tobacco Blues	The Narrator	Documentary
1999	Ballad of the Nightingale	Jean-Paul	
1999	The Straight Story	Lyle Straight	
1999	The Green Mile	"Toot-Toot"	Nominated — Screen Actors Guild Award for Outstanding Performance by a Cast in a Motion Picture
2000	The Man Who Cried	Felix Perlman	
2000	Sand	Leo	
2001	The Pledge	Floyd Cage	
2001	The Animal	The Hunter	Uncredited
2002	Sonny	Henry	
2002	Ginostra	Del Piero	
2003	Anger Management	The Blind Man	Uncredited
2004	Chrystal	Pa Da	
2004	The Big Bounce	Bob Rogers Sr.	
2004	Dig!	Himself	Documentary
2005	The Wendell Baker Story	Skip Summers	
2006	Alpha Dog	Cosmo Gadabeeti	
2006	Alien Autopsy	Harvey	
2006	You, Me and Dupree	"Curly"	Uncredited
2006	Inland Empire	Freddie Howard	
2007	The Good Life	Gus	
2007	Being Michael Madsen	Himself	
2007	Mr. Warmth: The Don Rickles Project	Himself	Documentary
2009	The Open Road	Amon	
2010	On Holiday	Josh, The Roommate's Dad	
2011	Rango	Balthazar	Voice
2011	This Must Be the Place	Robert Plath	
2012	The Avengers	Security Guard	
2012	Seven Psychopaths	Man In Hat	Boston Society of Film Critics Award for Best Cast; Nominated — San Diego Film Critics Society Award for Best Performance by an Ensemble
2012	Harry Dean Stanton: Partly Fiction	Himself	Documentary
2013	The Last Stand	Mr. Parsons	Uncredited
2013	9 Full Moons	Dimitri	
2013	Carlos Spills the Beans	"Rhino"	
2014	The Pimp and the Rose	Harry	Short film
2016	Hux	Grandpa	Short film
2017	Sick of it All	News Reporter	
2017	Lucky	"Lucky"	Gijón International Film Festival Award for Best Actor; Satellite Award for Best Actor – Motion Picture; Nominated — Chicago Film Critics Association Award for Best Actor; Nominated — Gotham Independent Film Award for Best Actor
2018	Frank & Ava	Sheriff Lloyd	Posthumous release; Final film role

== Television ==
Year	Title	Role	Notes
1954	Inner Sanctum	Andrew	Episode: "Hour of Darkness"
1957	Suspicion	Bill	Episode: "Four O'Clock"
1957	The Walter Winchell File	Country Boy	Episode: "Country Boy"
1958–1968	Gunsmoke	Various	8 episodes
1958	The Court of Last Resort	Unknown	Episode: "The Jacob Loveless Case"
1958	Panic!	Jerry	Episode: "Patrol"
1958	Decision	Simeon Dawson	Episode: "The Tall Man"
1958	The Adventures of Rin Tin Tin	Clint Dirkson	Episode: "Decision of Rin Tin Tin"
1958	Man with a Camera	Jerry	Episode: "Six Faces of Satan"
1958–1959	The Texan	Chad Bisbee / Frank Kaler	2 episodes
1958–1959	Rescue 8	Landers / Skeets, Young Bum	2 episodes
1958–1961	Zane Grey Theatre	Various	4 episodes
1959	U.S. Marshal	Robby Crane	Episode: "The Diner"
1959	Walt Disney Presents	Drew Griswold	Episode: "The Griswold Murder"
1959	Bat Masterson	Jay Simms	Episode: "Deadline"
1959	The D.A.'s Man	Barbo	Episode: "The Triangle"
1959	The Rifleman	Clemmie Martin	Episode: "Tension"
1959	The Lineup	Alfie	2 episodes
1959	Lock-Up	Tommy Fuller	Episode: "Writ of Terror"
1959	Westinghouse Desilu Playhouse	Rafe Daniels / Gordon	2 episodes
1959–1961	The Lawless Years	Various	4 episodes
1959-1962	Have Gun – Will Travel	"Slim" Wilder / Stoneman	2 episodes
1959–1963	Laramie	Various	4 episodes
1959–1965	Rawhide	Various	4 episodes
1960	The Man from Blackhawk	Sonny Blakey	Episode: "Diamond Cut Diamond"
1960	Johnny Ringo	Frank Brogger	Episode: "The Gunslinger"
1960	Alfred Hitchcock Presents	Lemon	Season 5 Episode 37: "Escape to Sonoita"
1960–1961	The Untouchables	Moxie / Picolo / The Newspaper Seller	3 episodes
1961	Gunslinger	Stacey	Episode: "Zone"
1961	The Roaring 20's	"Fingers"	Episode: "The Red Carpet"
1961	The Law and Mr. Jones	Harry Walker	Episode: "The Enemy"
1961-1963	Bonanza	Stiles / Billy	2 episodes
1962	Cain's Hundred	Hood #1	Episode: "The Plush Jungle: Benjamin Riker"
1962	Checkmate	The Singer	Episode: "The Heart Is a Handout"
1962	Stoney Burke	Dell Tindall	Episode: "Point of Honor"
1962	Combat!	Private Beecham	Episode: "A Day in June"
1963	Empire	Nick Crider	Episode: "Nobody Dies on Saturday"
1964-1969	Daniel Boone	Crane / Jeb Girty	2 episodes
1965	The Fugitive	Randy	Episode: "Moon Child"
1965	A Man Called Shenandoah	Quince Logan	Episode: "The Debt"
1966	The Big Valley	Swain	Episode: "By Force and Violence"
1966	Vacation Playhouse	Dayton Skagg	Episode: "Frank Merriwell"
1966	The Dangerous Days of Kiowa Jones	"Jelly"	Television film
1967	The Wild Wild West	Lucius Brand	Episode: "The Night of the Hangman"
1967	The Guns of Will Sonnett	J.J. Kates	Episode: "Meeting at Devil's Fork"
1967	Cimarron Strip	Luther Happ	Episode: "Till the End of Night"
1967	The Andy Griffith Show	The Proprietor	Episode: "Howard's New Life"
1968	The High Chaparral	Johnny Faro	Episode: "Gold Is Where You Leave It"
1968	The Virginian	Clint Daggert	Episode: "Ride to Misadventure"
1968	Mannix	Dean Hill	Episode: "Who Will Dig the Graves?"
1968	The Name of the Game	Joe "Joe-Joe"	Episode: "Pineapple Rose"
1969	Adam-12	Henry Fletcher	Episode: "Log 22:...So This Little Guy Goes Into a Bar, and..."
1969	Petticoat Junction	Ringo	Episode: "One of Our Chickens Is Missing"
1970	The Intruders	Whit Dykstra	Television film shot in 1967
1975	The Legendary Curse of the Hope Diamond	President Warren G. Harding	Television film
1976–1977	Mary Hartman, Mary Hartman	Jake Walters	4 episodes
1977	A Fistful of Dollars	Sheriff	Prologue made for ABC's first TV showings
1979	Flatbed Annie & Sweetiepie: Lady Truckers	C.W. Douglas	Television film
1979–1980	Young Maverick	"Pokey" Tindal	2 episodes
1980	The Oldest Living Graduate	Mike	Television film
1982	Laverne & Shirley	Johnny Velvet	Episode: "Star Peepers"
1983	I Want to Live!	Emmett Perkins	Television film
1986	Saturday Night Live	Himself / Host	Episode: "Harry Dean Stanton/The Replacements"
1987	Faerie Tale Theatre	Rip Van Winkle	Episode: "Rip Van Winkle"
1987	The Ransom of Red Chief	Sam	Television film
1988	The French as Seen By...	"Slim"	Television short
1989	The Jim Henson Hour	Chancey Bellow	Episode: "Monster Maker"
1990	Beyond the Groove	The Traveler	Episode: "Episode One"
1991	Payoff	Hook	Television film
1992	Hostages	Frank Reed	Television film
1993	Hotel Room	Moe	Episode: "Tricks"; Nominated — CableACE Award for Actor in a Dramatic Series
1994	Against the Wall	Hal	Television film
1996	Dead Man's Walk	Shadrach	3 episodes
2004	Two and a Half Men	Himself	Episode: "Back Off Mary Poppins"
2006–2010	Big Love	Roman Grant	37 episodes Nominated — Satellite Award for Best Supporting Actor – Series, Miniseries or Television Film (2007, 2009)
2009	Alice	Caterpillar	2 episodes
2010	Chuck	Harry	Episode: "Chuck Versus the Anniversary"
2011	Mongo Wrestling Alliance	Baron Kleberkuh	Voice; 9 episodes
2013–2015	Getting On	Leonard Butler	3 episodes
2017	Twin Peaks	Carl Rodd	5 episodes

== Video games ==
Year	Title	Role	Notes
2014	Alien: Isolation	Samuel Brett	Voice

== Music videos ==
Year	Title	Performer(s)	Notes
1983	"Say Say Say"	Paul McCartney & Michael Jackson	
1985	"A Whiter Shade of Pale"	Procol Harum	
1987	"Get Rhythm"	Ry Cooder	
1987	"Those Memories of You"	Dolly Parton, Linda Ronstadt, Emmylou Harris	
1996	"Sorry You Asked"	Dwight Yoakam	
2003	"Stop"	Black Rebel Motorcycle Club	
2009	"Dreamin' of You"	Bob Dylan	
2013	"Christmas in L.A."	The Killers	
