= Andrzej Krakowski =

Polish-American filmmaker

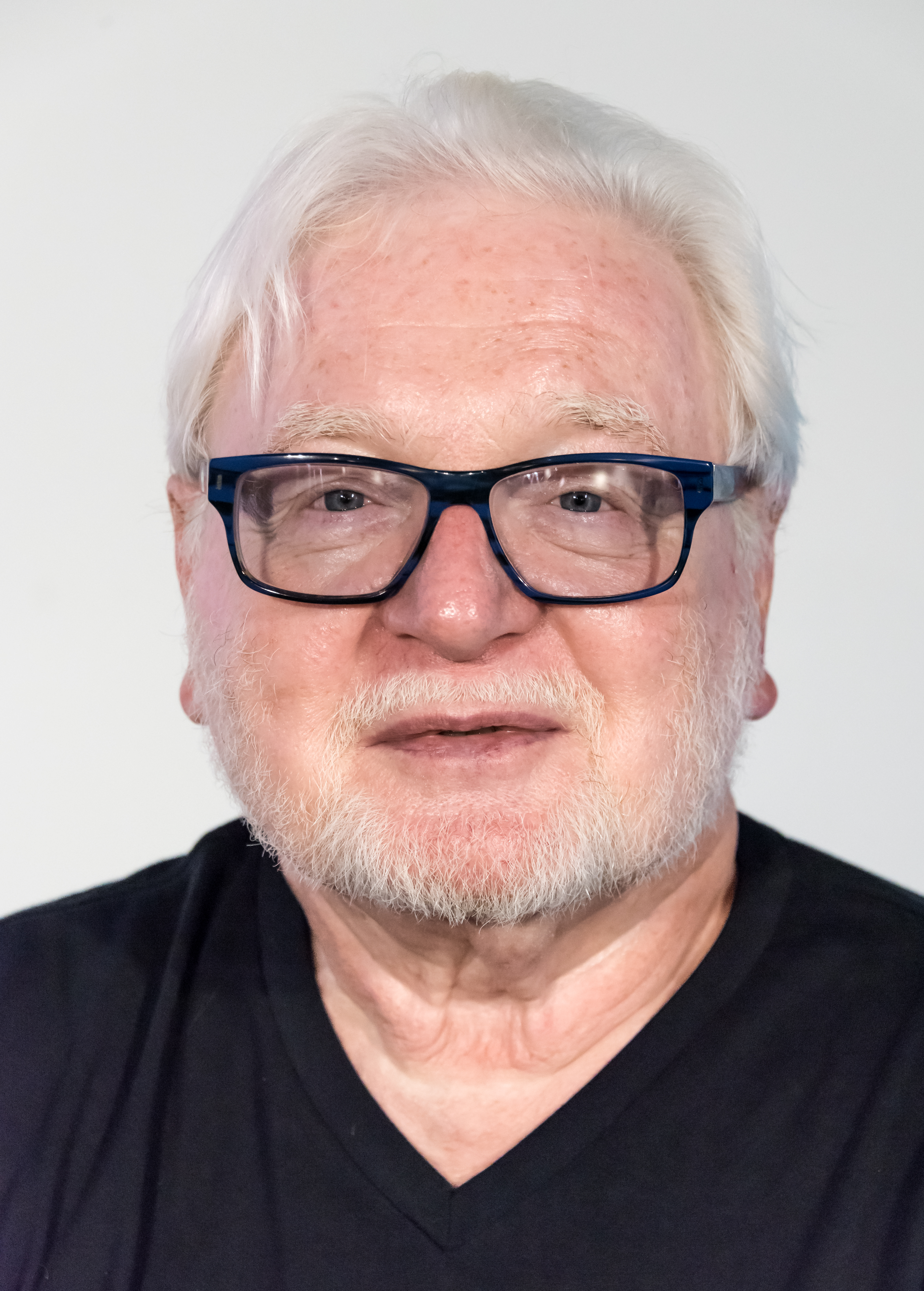
Andrzej Krakowski (2023)

Andrzej Krakowski (born 1946) is a Polish-American film producer, screenwriter, and director. His production of a 10-episode dramatic TV series We Are New York, funded by and produced for the Mayor's Office of New York, won two Emmy Awards in 2010. In 2022 Krakowski was awarded the Distinguished Pole Award in the Science Category, followed by the Distinguished Pole in the World title in 2023.

== Early life ==
Krakowski was born in Warsaw in 1946. His father was at different times a high-ranking politician, head of national tourism, political prisoner, and finally, the production head of a government-owned film studio 'Kamera'. His mother, a radio journalist, had held several important international posts in her field. His maternal grandmother was a Polish revolutionary, killed in Auschwitz. Krakowski grew up surrounded by the powerful men of politics on the one hand, and the often politically daring creators of Polish cinema on the other. World-renowned artists, writers, and philosophers such as Diego Rivera, Pablo Picasso, Ilia Ehrenburg, Nazim Hikmet, Max Frisch, Pablo Neruda, Yves Montand and Leszek Kołakowski were just a few of the many guests at the Krakowski home.

== Education ==
Krakowski received his education at the Polish National Film School in Łódź. He studied under several prominent film directors and worked as an intern assistant to Andrzej Wajda during the making of Ashes (1965). Attacked in the press after the March '68 student demonstrations, Krakowski was unexpectedly offered a scholarship in Hollywood. Shortly after he arrived in the U.S., he was stripped of Polish citizenship and forbidden to return to his homeland. In 2014 Krakowski received a Ph.D. from PWSFTviT (Polish National Film School) in Łódź.

== Career ==
In 1970, alongside David Lynch, Terrence Malick, Paul Schrader, and Jeremy Kagan, he became a producing auditor, and then a fellow, at the American Film Institute. During this period he worked on and line-produced several films for his AFI colleagues: Terrence Malick's Lanton Mills, Richard Patterson's Open Window, Jeremy Kagan's Love Song by Charles Faberman and Oscar Williams' The Final Comedown, launching careers of such actors as Ron Rifkin and Billy Dee Williams. Some of those films attained a cult status and are being taught at American colleges as part of a film curriculum.

Upon completing his education Krakowski joined YASNY Productions, Inc. as head of production. Among films he had green-lighted and supervised production was the 1976 Oscar-nominated feature-length documentary California Reich. After leaving YASNY, he continued producing films with his own Filmtel, Inc., including Portrait of a Hitman, starring Rod Steiger and Jack Palance, and White Dragon, with Christopher Lloyd and Dee Wallace Stone. The latter was the first co-production between CBS Films and Perspektywa, a Polish government-owned studio. In less than three years, Filmtel grew from a small production company into an international production and distribution conglomerate with offices in Los Angeles, New York, London, and Sydney. Expanding into television, Filmtel co-financed and distributed such successful TV shows as The Richard Simmons Show (for 4 years #1 daily-strip show in the country) and Showtime's XIV International Championship of Magic, hosted by the legendary Tony Randall.

After selling Filmtel, Krakowski returned to his first love. Today his screenwriting credits include: Triumph of the Spirit, starring Willem Dafoe and Edward James Olmos, Eminent Domain, with Donald Sutherland and Anne Archer, Tides of War, a vehicle for Ernest Borgnine and David Soul, Genghis Khan with Charlton Heston, Ogniem i Mieczem (With Fire and Sword), the highest-grossing film in Poland, as well as Managua, with Louis Gossett, Jr and Assumpta Serna in the lead. Facing the loss of his wife to breast cancer, Krakowski wrote, produced, and directed a feature-length documentary The Politics of Cancer, which received theatrical distribution in the U.S., and was shown the Cannes, Palm Springs, and Santa Barbara Film Festivals.

During 1997-2002 Krakowski, aside from his creative work, became a co-founder and Chief Creative Officer of two successful television networks: the first dual-platform (over-the-air and satellite) in Central Europe NaszaTV (now Scripps Networks) and the first US Internet TV network (ForeignTV.com) in New York.

In the first decade of 2000, Krakowski produced and directed a feature film based on a popular comic book, Campfire Stories, which has been sold to over 35 countries; a hit stage musical in Tokyo Felix The Cat's Musical Journey; a feature-length docudrama Farewell To My Country, chronicling the expulsion of the last Polish Jews from their homeland in 1968, and several commercials for Mercedes and BWIA airlines featuring Geoffrey Holder.

Krakowski's feature film, Looking for Palladin, was shot in Antigua, Guatemala. The cast includes such veteran American actors as Ben Gazzara, Talia Shire, David Moscow and Vincent Pastore, as well as Latin American stars such as Angélica Aragón, Pedro Armendáriz Jr., Roberto Díaz Gomar and the Morales Brothers. The film won several awards at international film festivals such as Best Feature Film at the Queens International Film Festival; Best Feature Film and Best Ensemble Cast at the Orlando Hispanic Film Festival, and Best Production at the Napa/Sonoma International Film Festival." It was released theatrically in 2010-11. Krakowski’s latest production, Pollywood, a feature-length documentary directed by Paweł Ferdek, won an award at the Krakow International Film Festival in 2020 and is being shown on HBO Europe and HBO+.

Krakowski's latest TV production, a 10-episode dramatic TV series titled We Are New York, was nominated for four and won two Emmy Awards in 2010.

In 2018, Krakowski wrote a play, Rejwach, and directed it at the National Jewish Theater in Warsaw, Poland.

Krakowski is the author of several books, among them: Pollywood: How Poles Created Hollywood; Pollywood II: Escapees In Paradise; Bronislaw Kaper: From The Beginning to The End; The World Through The Eye of a Screenwriter, and the bi-lingual Polish Oscars: What, Who, How Many, How and Why?, the winner of International Book Award 2023. He is also a contributing co-author of the New York Times bestseller No Better Friend.

Krakowski is a published cartoonist, whose work appeared in Business of Film, Foreign Confidential and Reunion '68. A retrospective exhibition of 366 drawings took place during the Festival of 4 Cultures in 2016. A bi-lingual album Hole in the Whole/Dziura w calym was published in 2017.

Krakowski is one of the founders of the highly regarded (5 student Oscars within its first 8 years) SUNY-Purchase film program. He is currently a tenured professor and the former Chair of the Media & Communication Arts Department at the City College of New York, where he teaches film directing, screenwriting, production, and critical studies.

== Filmography ==
- Smierc powstanca - 1966
- Wolnosc wyboru - 1967
- Przechodniu uwazaj - 1967
- Lanton Mills - 1969
- Frankenstein in a Fishbowl - 1970
- The Open Window - 1970
- The Wedding Was Beautiful, People Were Crying - 1972
- The Final Comedown - 1972
- Love Song by Charles Faberman - 1972
- The California Reich - 1975
- Jimbuck - 1977
- Crack Ups - 1984
- Womenspeak - 1984
- International Championship of Magic - 1985
- Bialy Smok - 1986
- What Has Four Wheels and Flies - 1986
- Hollywood Theater of Magic - 1986
- Legend of a White Horse - 1986
- Triumph of the Spirit - 1989
- Tides of War - 1990
- Eminent Domain - 1990
- Genghis Khan - 1991
- Tribute to Dr. Sabin - 1993
- The Politics of Cancer - 1995
- King David - 1996 (Theater)
- Managua - 1996
- NaszaTV - Agnes Live! - 1997 (90 segments)
- Ogniem i mieczem - 1999
- ForeignTV.com - 1999 (150 segments)
- Medium4.com - 2000 (200 segments)
- Campfire Stories - 2001
- Felix the Cat Musical Journey - 2001 (Theater)
- Flo Fox's Dictology - 2002
- Geoffrey Holder: The Unknown Side - 2002
- Farewell to my Country - 2003
- Stroke of Genius - 2006
- Andrzej Wajda: Man of Marble - 2006
- Andrzej Wajda: Man of Iron - 2006
- Looking for Palladin - 2009
- We Are New York - 2010 (10 segments)
- Mayer & Co. - 2014 (Theater):
- Rejwach - 2018 (Theater)
- Rejwach - 2019 (Theater)
- Pollywood - 2020
