= Race with the Devil =

1975 film by Jack Starrett

- Theatrical release poster
- Directed by: Jack Starrett
- Screenplay by: Wes Bishop; Lee Frost
- Produced by: Wes Bishop
- Starring: Peter Fonda; Warren Oates; Loretta Swit; Lara Parker; R.G. Armstrong; Peggy Kokernot
- Cinematography: Robert Jessup
- Edited by: John F. Link
- Music by: Leonard Rosenman
- Distributed by: 20th Century Fox
- Release dates: June 6, 1975 (Florida); July 9, 1975 (New York City)
- Running time: 88 minutes
- Country: United States
- Language: English
- Budget: $1.7 million
- Box office: $12 million

Race with the Devil is a 1975 American road horror film directed by Jack Starrett, written by Wes Bishop and Lee Frost, and starring Peter Fonda, Warren Oates, Loretta Swit, and Lara Parker. Its plot follows two couples on a road trip who are pursued by a Satanic cult after witnessing a human sacrifice while camping in rural Texas.

Filmed on location in rural Texas, Race with the Devil was released by 20th Century Fox in the summer of 1975, and became a frequent staple of drive-in theaters in the United States. The film was a box office success, grossing $12 million domestically.

This was the second of three films Fonda and Oates would star in together—The Hired Hand (1971) was their first and 92 in the Shade (1975) was their third. The film has been noted for its blending of horror, action, and car chase genres.

== Plot ==
Roger Marsh and Frank Stewart own a successful motorcycle dealership in San Antonio, Texas. Together with their wives Kelly and Alice, and Kelly's small dog, they leave San Antonio in a recreational vehicle (RV) for a much anticipated ski vacation in Aspen, Colorado. Along the way, they set up camp in a desolate meadow in central Texas, where Roger and Frank race their motorcycles together. Later that night, after their wives retire to the RV, the men witness a human sacrifice by a Satanic cult a short distance from their campsite, across a shallow river.

After being chased by the Satanists and barely escaping with their lives, they arrive in a small town and report the incident to Sheriff Taylor, who investigates but attempts to convince them that they probably only saw hippies killing an animal. Unbeknownst to the sheriff, Roger steals a sample of dirt stained with the murder victim's blood, intent on delivering it to the authorities in Amarillo, as he became suspicious of being driven to the crime scene without having to offer any directions.

At the same time, while cleaning, the wives find a cryptic rune pinned to the broken rear window of the RV, and they steal books about occultism from the local library to further research the incident, unaware they're being watched by a man in a red truck. One of the books reveals that the ritual is what Satanists often perform to gain magical powers. As the foursome leaves town, the sheriff notices the red truck that begins to follow the RV, making it clear that he is either aware or part of the Satanic cult.

When the couples arrive at an RV park, Kelly sees she is being stared at by its residents while in a swimming pool and wants to return home. Nonetheless, she accepts a dinner invitation from another couple at the park. While at the restaurant/nightclub, Kelly again sees she is being stared at menacingly, this time by one of the musicians. When they return from dinner, the group discovers that Kelly's dog, Ginger has been killed and hanged from the RV's broken open door, causing them to immediately leave the park. Shortly afterward, they find two rattlesnakes planted in the cupboards by the cultists. The frightened Kelly and Alice scream and panic, causing Frank to accidentally drive into a tree and break the RV motor's fan before the snakes are killed.

The next day, Kelly's dog is buried, after which Roger and Frank repair the motor and find their motorbikes' tires, wheels and gas tanks damaged. They purchase a shotgun and head towards Amarillo while being spied on by a steadily increasing number of cultists who seem to be networked throughout numerous small Texas towns. When Roger tries to place a long-distance call to the highway patrol, he finds one dead payphone and another with a "bad connection", and is told that long-distance service is down by a "big wind from up north".

The couples leave for Amarillo and are chased by the Satanists in various trucks, which the couples escape. Later, they encounter a staged school bus accident which Frank rightly assumes to be a ruse as it is a Sunday and none of the children appear hurt. The couples flee the scene and have another showdown with the cult members during another high-speed chase that pits their RV against numerous trucks and cars. Roger and Frank kill or injure most of the attackers, and the couples escape.

The RV's headlights were damaged during the chase, which forces the foursome to stop in a field at nightfall. They begin to celebrate when they pick up a radio signal coming from Amarillo. In the middle of their celebration, they hear chanting outside the RV and find themselves surrounded by cult members wearing black robes with hoods, including Sheriff Taylor and the couple with whom they had dinner. The cultists light a ring of fire around the RV, trapping the couples inside as they continue to chant.

== Cast ==
- Peter Fonda as Roger Marsh
- Warren Oates as Frank Stewart
- Loretta Swit as Alice
- Lara Parker as Kelly
- R.G. Armstrong as Sheriff Taylor
- Clay Tanner as Delbert, "Jack" Henderson
- Carol Blodgett as Ethel Henderson
- Ricci Ware as Ricci Ware
- Paul A. Partain as Cal Mathers
- James N. Harrell as Gun Shop Owner
- Karen Miller as Kay
- Arkey Blue as Arkey Blue
- Jack Starrett as Gas Station Attendant
- Wes Bishop as Deputy Dave
- Paul Maslansky (uncredited) as Road Worker In Cowboy Hat
- Dan Hewitt Owens (uncredited) as Jay
- John Buckley (uncredited) as Satanist

== Production ==
=== Filming ===
Race with the Devil was shot on location in Bandera, San Antonio, Castroville, Tarpley, and Leakey, Texas. Principal photography began in January 1975.

Screenwriter Lee Frost was originally hired to direct, but was replaced by Jack Starrett a week into shooting after executives at 20th Century Fox learned that the majority of the dialogue was being improvised on the set. Stars Fonda and Oates nearly dropped out of the project due to Frost's replacement, but eventually agreed to proceed making the film.

To accomplish the car stunts featured in the film, a total of sixteen cars, two trucks, and eight motorcycles were destroyed. Starrett later claimed he hired actual Satanists to serve as cultist extras, although that statement was likely made for publicity purposes.

Fonda recalled of shooting the film: "Most of the shoot was at night, and night shoots are always difficult. But Warren and I loved working together so much, we hardly noticed. We did have to tape signs on our doors that said, in Spanish and English, do not disturb before 4:30 p.m. during the night shooting. We would wrap by 5:00 a.m. or so, and take the drive back to the motel."

== Release ==
Race with the Devil opened regionally in Florida on June 6, 1975. It premiered in New York City on July 9, 1975, and in Los Angeles on August 27, 1975.

=== Home media ===
In October, 1985, CBS/Fox Video released it on its Key Video logo. In October 1991, then-newly established FoxVideo reissued it. In 2005, Anchor Bay Entertainment released the film on DVD.

On April 12, 2011, Shout! Factory released the film on DVD and Blu-ray, packaged as a double feature with another Peter Fonda film, Dirty Mary, Crazy Larry.

== Reception ==
=== Box office ===
20th Century Fox released the film theatrically in the United States in June 1975. Box office receipts were more than $12 million domestically, and it earned an equal amount internationally. It earned North American rentals of approximately $5.8 million. The film was a box office success for 20th Century Fox, and it played frequently at drive-in theaters in the United States.

=== Critical reception ===
Race with the Devil received mixed reviews from critics. On the review aggregator website Rotten Tomatoes, 71% of 14 critics' reviews are positive, with an average rating of 5.6/10. Metacritic, which uses a weighted average, assigned the film a score of 53 out of 100, based on 8 critics, indicating "mixed or average" reviews.

Bill von Maurer of The Miami News felt the film's screenplay was illogical, but still found it "gripping" and remarked on its disturbing ending. Joseph McBride of Variety praised the film's performances, Rosenman's score, and the action sequences but conceded that it "seems to be trying at times for an archetypal confrontation between middle-American values, as repped by the couples in their fortress-like motor home, and bizarre counter-culture elements embodied by the Satanists. But the story would have had more dramatic punch if the antagonists weren’t such formula types."

The New York Times panned the film: "This is a ridiculous mishmash of a movie for people who never grew up, which is not so say it's for children. One would think that Mr. Fonda and Mr. Oates had better things to do, but perhaps not. American movie production is in a bad state."

Writing in a retrospective for The Austin Chronicle in 2000, Jerry Renshaw noted, "This is some dumb, thoroughly predictable, drive-in flotsam, but between the cast and the nonstop action, it's fun nonetheless." Time Out magazine praised the film: "A wittily efficient quickie, the film is a winner all the way - a surprise, since Starrett's career thus far had been the movie director's equivalent of a criminal record."

The film has developed a strong cult following since the advent of home media.

== Remakes ==
A remake was planned in 2005, written by Drew McWeeny and Scott Swan, with Chris Moore (of Project Greenlight fame) to serve as director.

Kevin Smith has said Race With the Devil was a strong influence on his film Red State (2011). The film was also the basis for the Tamil language film Kazhugu (Eagle), released in 1981, and Drive Angry starring Nicolas Cage, released in 2011.

== See also ==
- List of American films of 1975

== Sources ==
- Muir, John Kenneth (2007). Horror Films of the 1970s. Jefferson, North Carolina: McFarland. ISBN 978-0-786-49156-8.
- Nowell, Richard (2010). Blood Money: A History of the First Teen Slasher Film Cycle. New York City, New York: Continuum Books. ISBN 978-1-441-18850-2.
- Solomon, Aubrey (1989). Twentieth Century Fox: A Corporate and Financial History. Lanham, Maryland: Scarecrow Press. ISBN 978-0-8108-4244-1.
