= The Mutant =

- The Outer Limits episode
- Episode no.: Season 1 Episode 25
- Directed by: Alan Crosland, Jr.
- Story by: Jerome B. Thomas
- Teleplay by: Allan Balter; Robert Mintz
- Cinematography by: Kenneth Peach
- Production code: 26
- Original air date: March 16, 1964

Guest appearances
- Larry Pennell; Warren Oates; Walter Burke; Betsy Jones-Moreland; Richard Derr; Herman Rudin; Robert Sampson

Episode chronology
| ← Previous "Moonstone" | Next → "The Guests" |

"The Mutant" is an episode of the original The Outer Limits television show. It was broadcast on March 16, 1964, during the first season. Directed by Alan Crosland Jr., the episode was co-written by Alan Balter and Robert Mintz. Actor Warren Oates plays a deranged astronaut who has become a telepathic killer.

== Introduction ==
Researchers on an alien planet live in fear of a man wearing goggles, a man who is paranoid and powerful—and can read minds.

== Opening narration ==
At this very moment, our horizon is menaced by two explosive forces, both man-made. One is a deadly wonder; the other, wondrously alive. Both forces have compelled Man to reach out for worlds beyond his own, new worlds where he may find peace, and room to grow. This is the first of those new worlds. The United Nations of Earth have claimed it, and called it Annex One. It is almost identical to Earth, except that there is no night—sunlight is constant. Early reports from the small expeditionary team stationed on Annex One indicated that the ancient planet appeared suitable for colonization by Earth's overflowing population. But the most recent reports have contained unspoken, oddly disturbing undercurrents, and the United Space Agency has decided to investigate. The man chosen: Dr. Evan Marshall, psychiatrist.

== Plot ==
An astronaut lands on an alien planet to investigate the death of one of a group of Earth scientists who are testing to see if the planet is suitable for colonization. The scientists, including Julie, his old flame, behave strangely, but refuse to explain why. They are particularly nervous around Reese Fowler, a fellow researcher who seems to wear his polarized goggles all the time, necessary due to the extreme brightness of the planet's sun. One of the scientists attempts to leave a hastily scribbled note in the astronaut's spacesuit pocket, warning him of what has been happening; he exits the room, only to bump into Reese, who seems to read his mind, and then destroys him with a mere touch. The astronaut is led to a remote cave by Julie and another researcher where he discovers that the others live in fear of Reese, who developed superhuman abilities when he was accidentally exposed to the planet's radioactive isotope-laden rainfall, which has mutating properties, resulting in the scientist's loss of hair and in the development of protruding eyes. Reese, knowing that if the others return to Earth he will be left behind because of the danger he poses, has been holding the others captive, while threatening his touch if they reveal the secret of his plight, all the time searching for a cure. The astronaut must somehow overcome a man who can read minds, and kill with a touch. To prevent Reese from knowing of his plans, the investigator is given a post-hypnotic suggestion to forget what he has learned, then—provided with a code word to recall the events—inform his superiors on Earth following his return. In an unfortunate twist of fate, Reese discovers the deception, and pursues the investigator and Julie into the cave, where they had met once before, with the intent to destroy them; however, due to his sensitivity to darkness, Reese apparently dies from the intense pain while trying to absorb the dim glow of a candle's flame into his light-starved eyes.

== Closing narration ==
The forces of violence and the forces of nature compel man to reach out toward new horizons, where peace and sanity may flourish, where there is room to grow. But before we run, should we not first make certain that we have done all that can be done here to end madness, quiet the disturbers of peace and make room for those who need so little to grow in?

== Cast ==
- Larry Pennell – as Evan Marshall
- Warren Oates – as Reese Fowler
- Walter Burke – as Dr. Fred Riner
- Betsy Jones-Moreland – as Julie Griffith
- Richard Derr – as Philip Griffith
- Herman Rudin – as Henry LaCosta
- Robert Sampson – as Peter Chandler
