= Depoy, Kentucky =

Unincorporated community in Kentucky, United States

- Unincorporated community
- Location within Kentucky Location within the United States
- Coordinates: 37°12′57″N 87°14′25″W
- Country: United States
- State: Kentucky
- County: Muhlenberg
- Elevation: 499 ft (152 m)
- Time zone: UTC-6 (Central (CST))
  - Summer (DST): UTC-5 (CST)
- GNIS feature ID: 490823

Depoy (/dɪˈpɔɪ/) is an unincorporated community located in Muhlenberg County, Kentucky, United States.

The community was a stop on the Illinois Central Gulf railroad, and was named for railroad agent Elmer Depoyster.

== Notable person ==
- Warren Oates, actor
