= Eminent Domain (film) =

1990 film by John Irvin

- Video release poster
- Directed by: John Irvin
- Written by: Andrzej Krakowski (story & screenplay); Richard Greggson (screenplay)
- Produced by: Véra Belmont
- Starring: Donald Sutherland; Anne Archer; Jodhi May; Paul Freeman; Anthony Bate; Bernard Hepton; Pip Torrens
- Cinematography: Witold Adamek
- Edited by: Peter Tanner
- Music by: Zbigniew Preisner
- Distributed by: Triumph Releasing; Europe Image Distribution
- Release date: 1990
- Running time: 106 minutes
- Countries: France; Canada; Israel
- Language: English

Eminent Domain is a 1990 historical drama film directed by John Irvin, and starring Donald Sutherland and Anne Archer.

== Plot ==
The film is based on the true story of a senior member of the Polish Politburo (played by Donald Sutherland) and his wife (played by Anne Archer) who are both abruptly banished from the party. While they struggle to figure out why, having unusual encounters with people they do not know in the process, things start to take a darker turn when the wife is sent to a mental asylum and their 15-year-old daughter is kidnapped.

== Cast ==
- Donald Sutherland - Josef Borski
- Anne Archer - Mira Borski
- Paul Freeman - Ben
- Anthony Bate - Kowal
- Jodhi May - Ewa
- Pip Torrens - Anton
- Françoise Michaud - Nicole
- Yves Beneyton - Roger
- Bernard Hepton - Slowak

== Production ==
The movie was filmed on location in Gdańsk and Warsaw. According to film publicity, the movie was based on actual occurrences.

The movie grossed $151,098 in a limited U.S. theatrical release.
