= The African Queen (novel) =

1935 novel by C. S. Forester

- First edition
- Author: C. S. Forester
- Language: English
- Genre: Adventure
- Publisher: Little, Brown and Company
- Publication date: 1935
- Publication place: United Kingdom

The African Queen is a 1935 novel by English author C. S. Forester, set in German East Africa during the opening months of World War I. The story follows Rose Sayer, a British missionary's sister, and Charlie Allnutt, the mechanic of a small steam-powered boat, as they travel down a river and attempt to destroy a German gunboat. During their journey, the two overcome dangerous rapids, mechanical failures, and tropical conditions while developing a romantic relationship.

The novel was adapted into the 1951 film The African Queen, starring Humphrey Bogart and Katharine Hepburn. It was also adapted for radio in 1952 and 2015, and a television film based on the characters aired in 1977.

== Plot summary ==
In August/September 1914, Rose Sayer, a 33-year-old British woman, is the companion and housekeeper of her brother Samuel, a Methodist missionary in German East Africa. (Note: Present-day Tanzania.) World War I has begun, and the German Schutztruppe commander of the area has conscripted all the natives; the village is deserted, and only Rose and her brother, who is dying, remain. Samuel dies during the night. That day, Allnutt, a London Cockney, arrives at the village. He is the mechanic and skipper of the African Queen, a steam-powered launch, owned by a Belgian mining corporation, that plies the upper reaches of the Ulanga River. Allnutt's two-man crew has deserted him because of the rumours of war and conscription. He buries Samuel and brings Rose to the launch.

The African Queen is well-stocked with tinned food, and carries a two-hundredweight cargo of blasting gelignite. It also holds two tanks of oxygen and hydrogen. Rose is inflamed with patriotism, and also filled with the desire to avenge insults that the Germans had piled on her brother. She realizes that the main German defence against a British attack by water in the area is a gunboat, Königin Luise, which guards the fictional Lake Wittelsbach into which the Ulanga feeds. She asks Allnutt if he can make the gelignite into a makeshift torpedo. After some thought, Allnutt concludes that by loading the gelignite inside the emptied tanks, putting them into the bow of the launch, and rigging a detonator, they could turn the launch itself into a large torpedo. Allnutt and Rose set off down the Ulanga, her steering and him maintaining the launch's ancient steam engine.

The descent to the lake poses three main problems: passing the German-held town of Shona; navigating heavy rapids and cataracts; and getting through the river delta. After days on the river, they come close to Shona, and Allnutt's nerve fails. He refuses to take the launch under fire, anchors in a backwater, and gets drunk on gin. Unable to work the launch single-handedly, Rose sets out to make Allnutt's life miserable until he agrees to her plan. While he is asleep, she pours all his gin overboard, then refuses to speak to him. The weak-willed Allnutt eventually gives in, and the launch gets underway again. They come in sight of Shona at midday. The German commander assumes that the launch is coming in to surrender (because he believes no boat could pass the rapids downriver from the town, so Shona is the only possible destination). After realising his mistake, he and his men open fire, but the launch sustains only minor damage as it passes the town.

The African Queen then spends days shooting the rapids; Exhilarated, Allnutt and Rose are reconciled and become lovers. He reveals that his first name is Charlie. On the third day, the launch strikes on rocks while navigating some rapids, goes off course and does not respond well to the tiller, so they are forced to anchor on the lee side of a rock outcropping. Allnutt dives into the water to inspect the launch's underside and finds that the driveshaft is bent and the propeller has lost a blade. Over the next weeks they slowly repair the damage without being able to beach the launch; Allnutt has to dive repeatedly to remove the shaft and propeller. On shore, they gather wood and construct a makeshift bellows to heat the shaft so Allnutt can straighten it. Then Allnutt makes a new propeller blade out of scrap iron and bolts it to the stump of the old blade. After numerous dives to fix the shaft and propeller, they continue on their way and pass the rapids, coming out of the Ulanga River into the Bora River, which feeds into the lake. By this point, Rose has become an expert at using the tiller and reading the complex changes of the river.

Passing the river delta is long and arduous. Tormented by biting insects, sickened by malaria, and wracked by the heat and thunderstorms, they drag the launch through miles of reeds and water-grass with their boat-hooks, occasionally diving to cut fallen logs out of their way. Though the launch is shallow (with a draft of only thirty inches), it constantly runs aground on the thick mud. After weeks of labour, they emerge into the lake.

They hide the launch in a stand of reeds and begin constructing the torpedo. Allnutt releases the gas from his tanks and unscrews the valves, leaving a hole big enough for him to fill the tanks with gelignite, packed in mud. He cuts two holes in the front of the launch, right at the waterline, and fixes the tanks there; he then constructs detonators from nails and revolver cartridges, so the gelignite will detonate on impact. All that is left is to pilot the launch right into the side of the Königin Luise, and the resulting explosion will destroy both vessels. They have been keeping track of the gunboat's habits, and choose a night when it will be anchored close to them. They argue about which of them should pilot the launch and which should stay behind, but end up agreeing that they will both go. They fire up the engine and set out on the attack, but halfway to their target a storm sweeps up and overwhelms them; the launch sinks, and Rose and Allnutt have to swim for safety.

The two are separated in the storm, and they are captured by the Germans the next day. They are brought before the captain of the Königin Luise to be tried as spies. Both refuse to say how they came to the lake, but the captain sees "African Queen" written on Rose's life-saver and deduces that they must be the mechanic and the missionary's sister from the missing launch. He decides it would be uncivilised to execute them, so he flies a flag of truce and delivers them to the British naval commander, who dismissively sends them to separate tents under guard while he takes his newly arrived reinforcements out to sink the Königin Luise. Having succeeded in this, he sends Rose and Allnutt to the coast to speak to the British Consul and advises Allnutt to enlist in the South African Army. The couple agrees that when they reach the coast they will ask the Consul to marry them.

== Background ==
The MV Liemba, named SMS Graf von Goetzen during World War I, was the inspiration for the German gunboat.

== Adaptations ==
The novel was made into a film in 1951: The African Queen, starring Humphrey Bogart as Charlie Allnutt and Katharine Hepburn as Rose Sayer. Allnutt is changed to a Canadian in the film to explain Bogart's accent. The church is changed to Methodist from Anglican - though the paper which Allnut delivers to the missionaries in the first scene records the elevation of a college friend of the missionaries to being a bishop, which makes no sense given that the Methodist Church of Great Britain has no bishops. There are significant changes to the plot after the sinking of the African Queen.

Bogart reprised his role for the Lux Radio Theatre in 1952 opposite Greer Garson as Rose.

In 1977, a one-hour made-for-television film called The African Queen aired on CBS. Intended as a pilot for a television series following the further adventures of the Alnutts, it stars Warren Oates as Charlie and Mariette Hartley as Rose.

In February 2015, a one-hour radio dramatization featuring Samantha Bond and Toby Jones in the leading roles was broadcast on BBC Radio 4. The dramatization follows the plot of the original novel.
