= The African Queen (1977 film) =

1977 American television film

- Genre: Adventure
- Based on: The African Queen by C. S. Forester
- Screenplay by: Irving Gaynor Neiman
- Directed by: Richard C. Sarafian
- Starring: Warren Oates; Mariette Hartley
- Composer: John Murtaugh
- Country of origin: United States
- Original language: English

Production
- Executive producer: Mark Carliner
- Producer: Len Kaufman
- Production location: Everglades
- Cinematography: James Pergola
- Running time: 50 minutes

Original release
- Network: CBS
- Release: March 18, 1977

The African Queen is a television film which aired on CBS on March 18, 1977. It stars Warren Oates as Captain Charlie Allnut and Mariette Hartley as Rose Sayer, roles originated by Humphrey Bogart and Katharine Hepburn in the 1951 film of the same name.

== Plot summary ==
Rather than being a remake, the plot continues after the events of the original story, with Allnut and Sayer being recaptured by the Germans and forced to transport a 75mm cannon.

== Cast ==
- Warren Oates as Capt. Charlie Allnut
- Mariette Hartley as Rose Sayer
- Tyrone Jackson as Kaninu
- Alfred Polsen as Major Strauss
- Wolf Roth as Lt. Biedemeyer
- Frank Schuller as Pvt. Heinke
- Johnny Sekka as Jogana
- Clarence Thomas as Sgt. Abuttu
- Raymond Forchion as African Villager (uncredited)

== Reception ==
Television critic Cecil Smith described the film's concept as "maybe the silliest in the history of the medium." Variety opined that the leads "Both turn in pro jobs but are necessarily haunted by their predecessors."

Though intended to be a pilot for a television series, it received disappointing ratings and was not picked up.
