= African Queen (boat) =

Historic boat in the US

- U.S. National Register of Historic Places
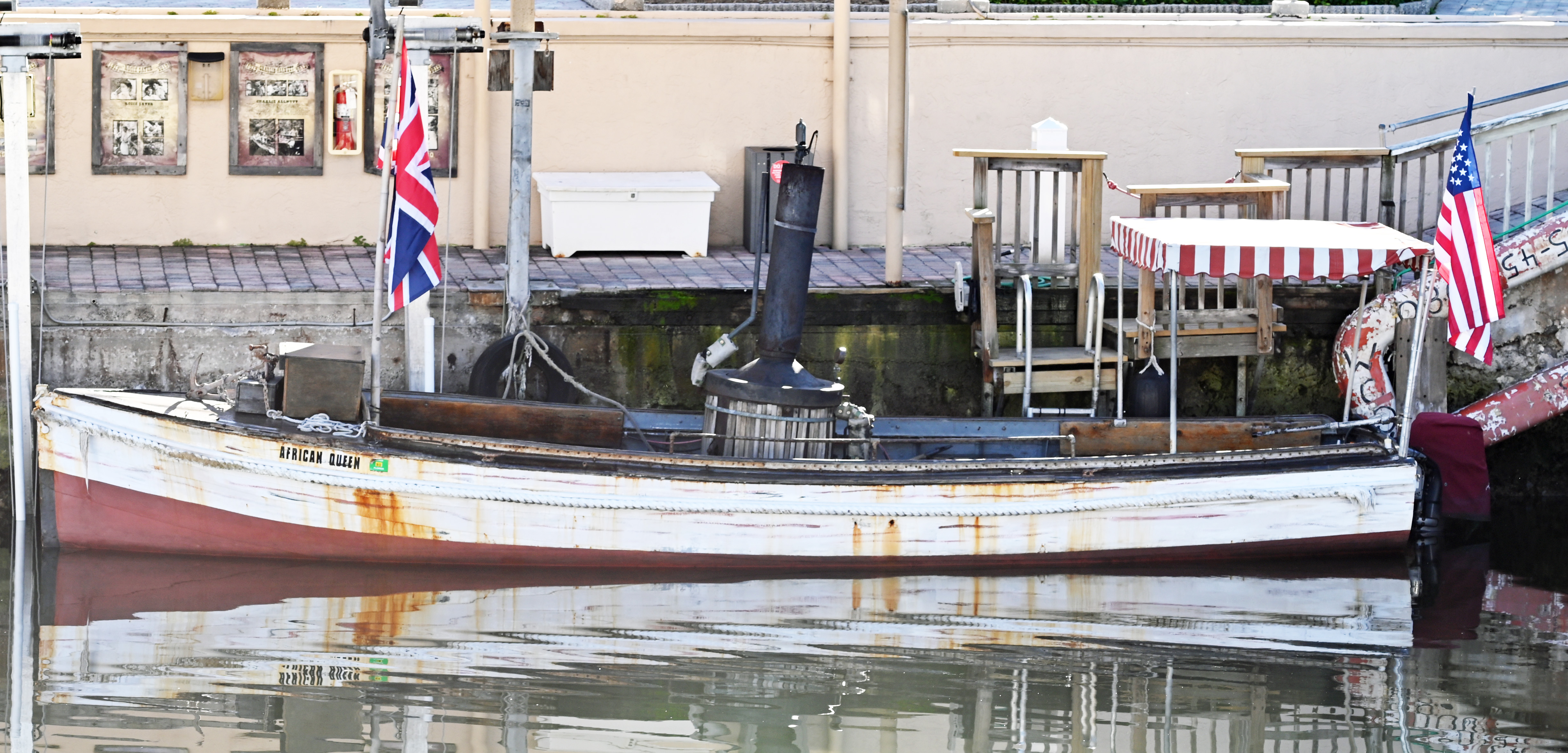
- The African Queen, January 2023

- Location within Florida Location within the United States
- Location: Key Largo, Florida
- Coordinates: 25°5′44.06″N 80°26′17.83″W
- Built: 1912 and 1950
- Architects: Lytham Shipbuilding & Engineering Co
- NRHP reference No.: 91001771
- Added to NRHP: February 18, 1992

African Queen (also known as S/L Livingstone) was the name of two boats used in the 1951 movie The African Queen starring Humphrey Bogart and Katharine Hepburn. It was filmed in the Belgian Congo on a tributary of the Congo River, and on the Nile in the Murchison Falls National Park in Uganda. Two boats were used, one in each location. One of the boats is now located in Key Largo, Florida, and on February 18, 1992, was added to the U.S. National Register of Historic Places. The other is located in Jinja, Uganda.

== History ==
=== The Congo boat ===
This African Queen was a 30-foot steam boat built of riveted sheet iron in 1912 in the United Kingdom for service in Africa on the Victoria Nile and Lake Albert where the movie was filmed in 1950. Originally named Livingstone, she was built for the British East Africa Railway and used from 1912 to 1968. She spent most of her first 50 years in the waters of the Ruki River in the northern Democratic Republic of Congo where she was used to transport hunters, mercenaries, and cargo.

According to an article on its 2012 restoration, the boat was built by Lytham Shipbuilding and Engineering Co., as evidenced by the boiler plate and Lancashire records.

The boat was found in Cairo, Egypt in the 1970s, with coal still in its bilges. Purchased and shipped to the United States, she has had a succession of owners and is currently held in trust. The boat was refurbished in 2012, including installation of an interior steel hull frame and new boiler, and restored to service as a tourist boat.

=== The Nile boat ===
The other African Queen was built in 1950 for the film and was discovered by Yank Evans, a Patagonian mechanical engineer who had come across what was left of the vessel while working on the roads in Murchison Falls National Park, Uganda in 1984. "Yank came across a carcass of a steel boat, in the bushes there just left to rot. He asked the locals what this was and they said well that's the African Queen. So he bought it off the National Parks for $1." Evans, who had worked on the boat with his son Billy and gave her a steam engine then stored the boat when he moved to Kenya in 1997 and her new home became a trailer in the garden.

Cam McLeay purchased the Nile African Queen after hearing her story and set to finishing the restorations and getting the boat's original steam engine functioning and in the water. McLeay and his team rebuilt the African Queen's century-old Brady steam engine and replating the hull and replacing over 100 pipes, sourcing parts mostly from the UK but also from within Uganda.

== Gallery ==
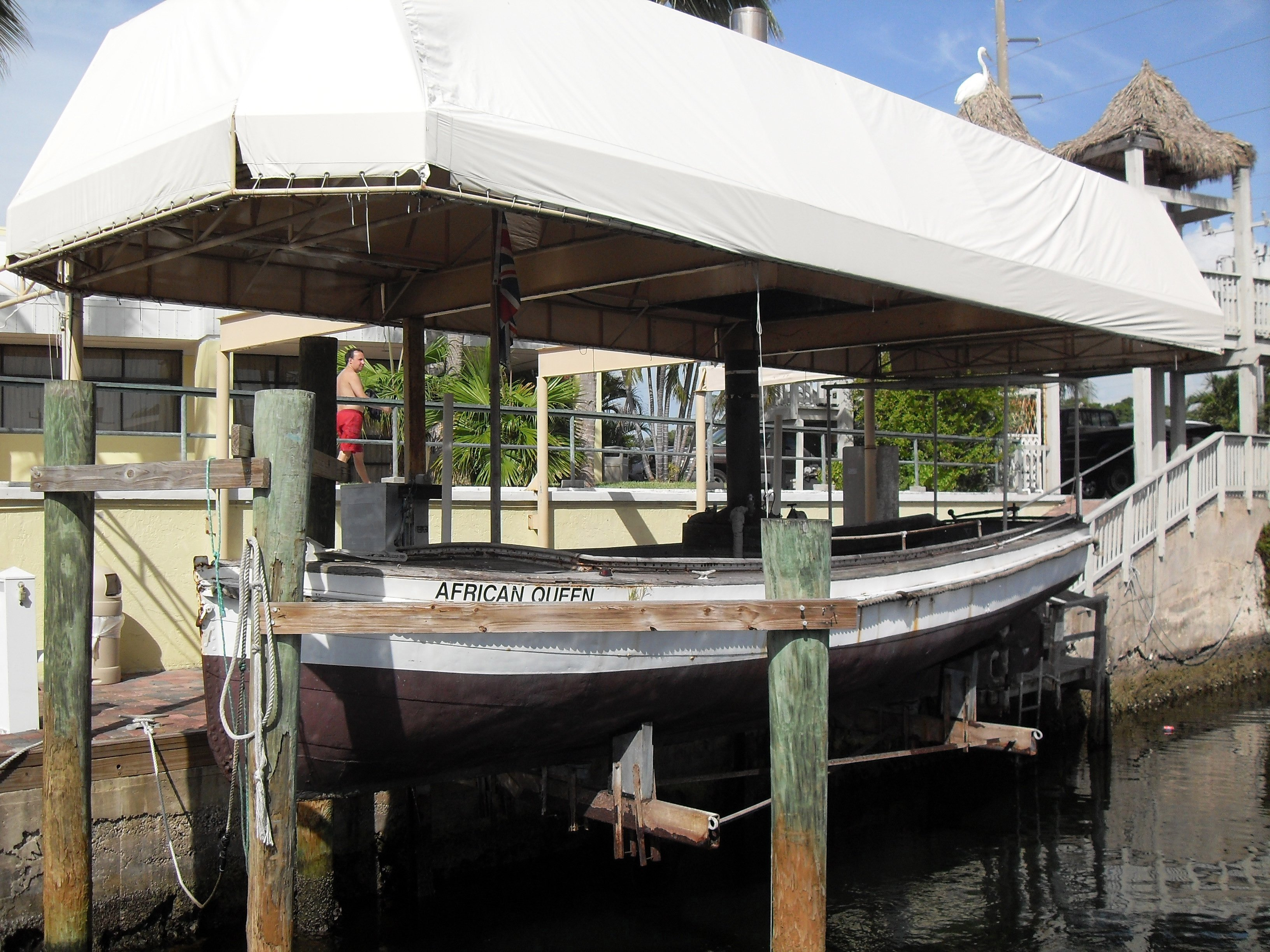
The African Queen under a canvas canopy in 2009

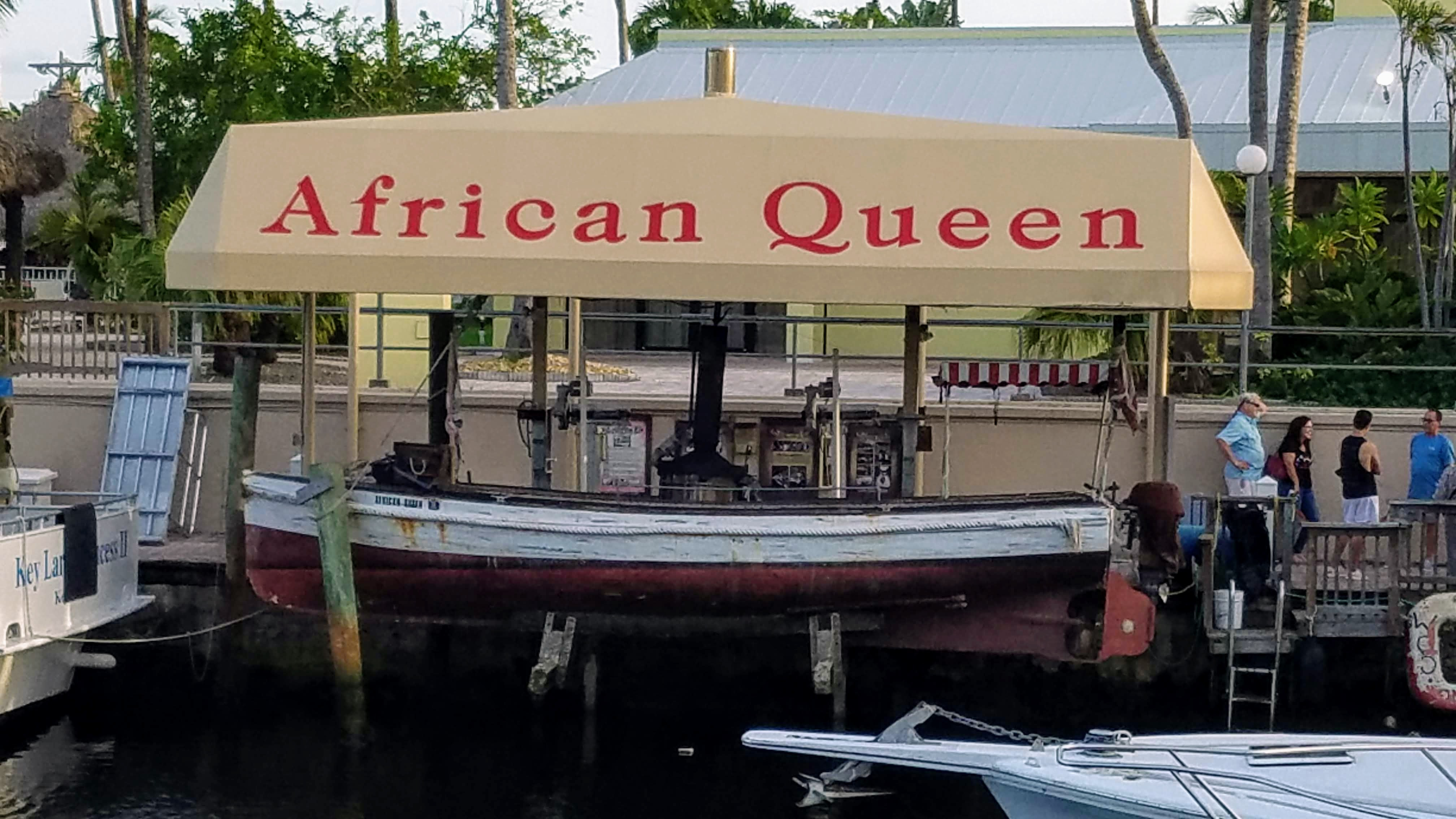
The African Queen, June 2020
