= African Queen (1787 ship) =

History

Great Britain
- Launched: 1775, East Indies
- Renamed: African Queen
- Fate: Foundered 1793

General characteristics
- Tons burthen: 376, or 402 (bm)
- Complement: 20

African Queen was built in the East Indies in 1775, probably under a different name. She first appeared in Lloyd's Register (LR) as African Queen in 1787. She made one voyage as a slave ship in the triangular trade in enslaved people. Afterwards, she sailed between England and North America. She foundered in 1793.

== Career ==
Captain Cobb Taylor sailed from London on 25 May 1787, bound for West Africa. African Queen acquire captives at New Calabar. She arrived at Kingston, Jamaica 12 February 1788. She had arrived with 466 captives and she landed 451. She left Kingston on 5 May, and arrived back at London on 8 July.

Captain James Downey (or Downie) replaced Captain Taylor c. 1788. On 12 February 1793, African Queen, Downie, master, was at Deal when a gale drove her into Tom, Smith, master. African Queen was on her way to Sierra Leone and Tom was on her way to Liverpool. Tom lost her mizzenmast and African Queen lost her jib and boom, and sustained substantial damage.

== Fate ==
On 12 August 1793, a hurricane hit Nevis. African Queen drove out to sea, where she foundered.

== Lloyd's Register ==
Year	Master	Owner	Trade	Source
1787	C. Taylor	Margentin	London–Africa	LR
1789	C.Taylor; J. Downie	J.Crammond	London–Africa; London–New Brunswick	LR
1791	J.Downie	J.Crammond; J. Rodgers & Co.	London–Nova Scotia	LR
