= Lanton Mills =

- Directed by: Terrence Malick
- Written by: Terrence Malick
- Produced by: John Roper
- Starring: Harry Dean Stanton; Terrence Malick; Warren Oates
- Cinematography: Caleb Deschanel
- Edited by: John Palmer
- Music by: Terrence Malick
- Release date: 1969
- Running time: 17 minutes
- Country: United States
- Language: English

Lanton Mills is an American comedy short film written and directed by Terrence Malick and starring Malick, Warren Oates, Harry Dean Stanton (in a leading role), and Paula Mandel. The film was Malick's thesis project for the American Film Institute, was completed in 1969, and is known to have screened in 1974.

== Summary ==
The story concerns two apparently 19th-century cowboys (Stanton and Malick) plotting to rob a bank in Texas, which they do in the 20th century.

A film writer who viewed a VHS copy at the American Film Institute described it:

Visually, it is rich in elements that would become Malick's trademarks. Daylight assumes a tactile presence — though here it is not the diffuse "magic hour" light (i.e., malick-light) of later films, but a bold late afternoon sun that streams through leaves, creating shadow and dappled highlight on the characters' faces. The camera angles tend to be either wide or wider, even in dialogue scenes. Also familiar from Malick's later films is the attention to landscape and nature. ... But what makes "Lanton Mills" feel completely different from Malick's later work is its unrestrained, anarchic comedy. ... Though the jokes play out in an absurdist, disconcerting key, they still make us laugh (or at least shake our heads with a puzzled smile).

The producer was John Roper, the cinematographer Caleb Deschanel, and the editor John Palmer, with Malick composing the music.

The film was influenced by Don Quixote and classic westerns.

== Cast ==
- Lanton: Dean Stanton
- Tilman: Terrence Malick
- Gunman: Warren Oates
- Phantom: Lash LaRue
- Mute: Tony Bill
- Teller: Paul Ehrman
- Customer in Bank: Paula Mandel
- 1st cop: Ken Smith
- 2nd cop: John Schmitz

== See also ==
- List of American films of 1969
- Badlands, Malick's 1973 feature film debut also about 20th century outlaws
- List of works influenced by Don Quixote
- List of Western films
