= Warren Oates =

American actor (1928–1982)

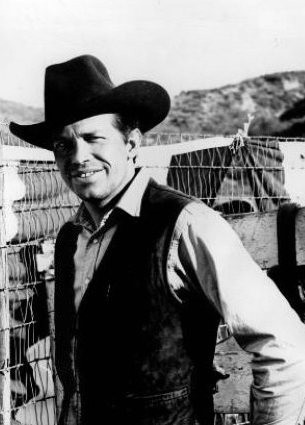
- Oates in 1963
- Born: Warren Mercer Oates; July 5, 1928; Depoy, Kentucky, U.S.
- Died: April 3, 1982 (aged 53); Los Angeles, California, U.S.
- Education: University of Louisville
- Occupation: Actor
- Years active: 1953–1982
- Spouses: Teddy Louise Farmer (m. 1959; div. 1966) Vickery Turner (m. 1969; div. 1974) Judy A. Jones (m. 1977)
- Children: 4
- Awards: See below
- Military service
- Allegiance: United States
- Branch: United States Marine Corps
- Service years: 1946–48
- Rank: Corporal

Warren Mercer Oates (July 5, 1928 – April 3, 1982) was an American actor. He was best known for his roles in Western and crime films, most notably in collaboration with directors Sam Peckinpah and Monte Hellman. He had starring roles in Peckinpah's The Wild Bunch (1969) and Bring Me the Head of Alfredo Garcia (1974). Other of his most acclaimed performances was as officer Sam Wood in Norman Jewison's In the Heat of the Night (1967) and as Mr. Sargis in Terrence Malick's Badlands (1973).

Associated with the New Hollywood movement of the 1960s and '70s, Oates starred in numerous films during the early 1970s that have since achieved cult status, such as The Hired Hand and Two-Lane Blacktop (1971), Cockfighter (1974), and Race with the Devil (1975). Oates also portrayed John Dillinger in the biopic Dillinger (1973) and as the supporting character U.S. Army Sergeant Hulka in the military comedy Stripes (1981). Another notable appearance of his was in the classic New Zealand film Sleeping Dogs (1977), in which he played the commander of the American forces in the country.

== Early life ==
Warren Oates was born and reared in Depoy, a tiny rural community in Muhlenberg County, Kentucky, located just a few miles west of Greenville, the county seat. According to the federal census of 1940, he was the younger of two sons born to Sarah Alice (née Mercer) and Bayless Earle Oates, who owned a general store. His brother, Gordon, was five years his senior.

On his father's side, Warren was of English, Scottish, and Welsh ancestry. He attended Louisville Male High School in Louisville, Kentucky, until 1945, but did not graduate from that institution. He later earned a high-school equivalency diploma. After high school, he enlisted in the United States Marine Corps for two years (1946–1948), serving in its air wing as an aircraft mechanic and reaching the rank of corporal.

Oates became interested in theater while attending the University of Louisville, where in 1953 he starred in several plays produced by the school's Little Theater Company. Four years later, in New York City, he got an opportunity to star in a live production of the television series Studio One.

== Career ==
Oates moved to Los Angeles, where in the 1950s he began to establish himself in guest roles in weekly television Westerns, including Wagon Train, Tombstone Territory, Buckskin, Rawhide, Trackdown, Tate, The Rebel, Wanted Dead or Alive, The Virginian, Have Gun – Will Travel, Lawman, The Big Valley, Bat Masterson, and Gunsmoke.

In the episode "Subterranean City" (October 14, 1958) of the syndicated Rescue 8, Oates played a gang member, Pete, who is the nephew of series character Skip Johnson (Lang Jeffries). In the story line, rescuers Johnson and Wes Cameron (Jim Davis) search for a lost girl in the sewer tunnels and encounter three criminals hiding out underground. Pete soon breaks with his gang companions and joins the firemen Wes and Skip in locating the missing child.

In 1961, Oates guest-starred in the episode "Artie Moon" in NBC's The Lawless Years crime drama about the 1920s. In 1962, he appeared as Ves Painter in the short-lived ABC series Stoney Burke, co-starring Jack Lord, a program about rodeo contestants.

Oates also played in a number of guest roles on The Twilight Zone (in "The Purple Testament" and "The 7th Is Made Up of Phantoms" (1963), in which he costarred with Randy Boone and Ron Foster), The Outer Limits ("The Mutant" [1964]), Combat! ("The Pillbox" [1964]) and Lost in Space ("Welcome Stranger" [1965]). During the 1960s and 1970s, he guest-starred on such shows as 12 O'Clock High ("The Hotshot" [1965]), Lancer, and The Virginian. While making a guest appearance on a segment of the Western television series Dundee and the Culhane, Oates managed to steal the show with his off-camera antics and bloopers that had everyone on the set rolling. After a long day of filming, he headed over and set his footprints in concrete along with all the other stars who appeared at Apacheland Movie Ranch.

"There were 40 [Western] series, and I went from one to the other. I started out playing the third bad guy on a horse and worked my way up to the number-one bad guy," Oates once quipped. Oates did play the good guy once as Deke Bassop in the title role of the episode “The Bassops” on Gunsmoke in 1964.

Oates first met Peckinpah when he played a variety of guest roles in The Rifleman (1958–1963), a popular television series co-created and sometimes directed by Peckinpah. He also played a supporting role in Peckinpah's short-lived series The Westerner in 1960. The collaboration continued as he worked in Peckinpah's early films Ride the High Country (1962) and Major Dundee (1965) and resulted in two of his most famous film roles.

In the 1969 Western classic The Wild Bunch, he portrayed Lyle Gorch, a long-time outlaw who chooses to die with his friends during the film's violent conclusion. According to his wife at the time, Teddy, Oates had the choice of starring in Support Your Local Sheriff!, to be filmed in Los Angeles, or The Wild Bunch in Mexico. "He had done Return of the Seven in Mexico; he got hepatitis, plus dysentery, but off he went again with Sam [Peckinpah]. He loved going on location. He loved the adventure of it. He had great admiration for Sam."

In Bring Me the Head of Alfredo Garcia, the dark 1974 action/tragedy also filmed in Mexico, Oates played the lead role of Bennie, a hard-drinking, down-on-his-luck musician and bartender hoping to make a final score. The character was reportedly based on Peckinpah. For authenticity, Oates wore the director's sunglasses while filming scenes of the production.

Although the Peckinpah film roles are his best-known, his most critically acclaimed role is GTO in Monte Hellman's 1971 cult classic Two-Lane Blacktop. The film, although a failure at the box office, is studied in film schools as a treasure of the 1970s, in large part due to Oates' performance. Film critic Leonard Maltin remarked that Oates' performance as GTO was as good as any he had seen and should have won the Oscar.

Oates had a close relationship with Hellman, and worked with him on three other films: the Western film The Shooting (1966), co-starring a young Jack Nicholson, Cockfighter (1974), and China 9, Liberty 37 (1978), in which Peckinpah, who was also a friend of Hellman's, featured in a rare acting role. Oates' wife Teddy said, "Sam Peckinpah and Monte Hellman were the two directors with whom Warren would work anytime, anywhere."

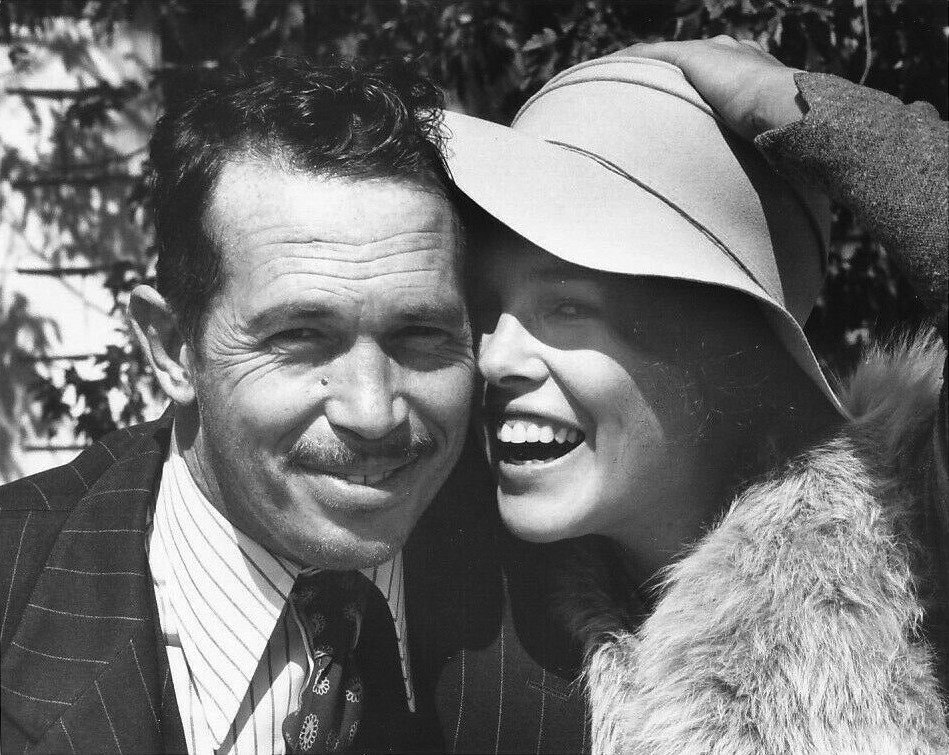
Oates with Michelle Phillips, Dillinger 1973

In addition to Peckinpah and Hellman, Oates worked with several major directors of his era, including Leslie Stevens in the 1960 film Private Property, his first starring role; Norman Jewison in In the Heat of the Night (1967); Joseph L. Mankiewicz in There Was a Crooked Man... (1970); John Milius in Dillinger (1973); Terrence Malick in Badlands (1973); Philip Kaufman in The White Dawn (1974); William Friedkin in The Brink's Job (1978); and Steven Spielberg in 1941 (1979).

He appeared in the Sherman Brothers' musical version of Tom Sawyer (1973), as Muff Potter, the town drunk. He also starred in The Rise and Fall of Legs Diamond (1960), Return of the Seven (1966), The Split (1968), The Thief Who Came to Dinner (1973), Drum (1976), and played the title role in a 1971 crime drama, Chandler. Oates costarred three times with friend Peter Fonda in The Hired Hand (1971), Race with the Devil (1975), and 92 in the Shade (1975).

Oates was cast in Roger Donaldson's 1977 New Zealand film Sleeping Dogs together with New Zealand actor Sam Neill. A political thriller with action film elements, Sleeping Dogs follows the lead character "Smith" (Neill) as New Zealand plunges into a police state, as a fascist government institutes martial law after industrial disputes flare into violence. Smith gets caught between the special police and a growing resistance movement, and reluctantly becomes involved. Oates plays the role of Willoughby, commander of the American forces stationed in New Zealand and working with the New Zealand fascist government to find and subdue "rebels" (the resistance movement).

A year before his death, Oates costarred with Bill Murray in the 1981 military comedy Stripes. In the role of the drill sergeant, Sgt. Hulka, Oates played the straight man to Murray's comedic character. The film was a huge financial success, earning $85 million at the box office. In 1982, he costarred opposite Jack Nicholson in director Tony Richardson's The Border.

In 1981, Oates also costarred as a fanatical Southern preacher-turned-Confederate officer in The Blue and the Gray, a CBS TV miniseries that aired in November 1982. His last two films were not released until 1983: Blue Thunder and Tough Enough, both filmed in late 1981. Both films are dedicated to him, along with Monte Hellman's 1988 film Iguana, which ends with the titles "For Warren".

== Death ==
Oates was ill with influenza in the weeks before his death. On April 3, 1982, at the age of 53, he died of a heart attack while taking an afternoon nap at his home in Los Angeles, after having experienced chest pains and shortness of breath earlier that day. An autopsy determined that he had chronic obstructive pulmonary disease. After his funeral, in accordance with Oates' wishes, his body was cremated and his ashes were scattered at his ranch in Montana.

== Legacy ==
Oates has a dedicated cult following because of his performances in Peckinpah's studio films and television shows, Monte Hellman's independent works, his films with Peter Fonda, and in a number of B movies from the 1970s. During a screening of Hellman's Two-Lane Blacktop, Richard Linklater introduced the film, and gave 16 reasons why viewers should love it. The sixth was: "Because there was once a god who walked the Earth named Warren Oates."

On the occasion of a retrospective dedicated to the actor, the Lincoln Center wrote, "With his rough-hewn face and gruff demeanor, Warren Oates had the kind of offbeat, chameleon-like screen presence that could only have belonged to a star of the freewheeling New Hollywood of the 1960s and ’70s."

The documentary film Warren Oates: Across the Border was produced by Tom Thurman in 1993 as a tribute to the actor's career.

Oates was the subject of a 2009 biography, Warren Oates: A Wild Life, written by Susan Compo.

== Filmography ==
=== Film ===
Year	Title	Role	Director	Notes
1959	Up Periscope	Seaman Kovacs	Gordon Douglas	Uncredited
1959	Yellowstone Kelly	Corporal	Gordon Douglas	
1960	The Rise and Fall of Legs Diamond	Eddie Diamond	Budd Boetticher	
1960	Private Property	'Boots'	Leslie Stevens	
1962	Ride the High Country	Henry Hammond	Sam Peckinpah	1st collaboration with Peckinpah
1962	Hero's Island	Wayte Giddens	Leslie Stevens	
1964	Mail Order Bride	Jace	Burt Kennedy	
1965	The Rounders	Harley Williams	Burt Kennedy	Uncredited
1965	Major Dundee	O.W. Hadley	Sam Peckinpah	
1966	The Shooting	Willett Gashade, Coigne Gashade	Monte Hellman	1st collaboration with Hellman
1966	Return of the Seven	Colbee	Burt Kennedy	
1967	Welcome to Hard Times	Leo Jenks	Burt Kennedy	
1967	In the Heat of the Night	Sam Wood	Norman Jewison	
1968	The Split	Marty Gough	Gordon Flemyng	
1969	Smith!	Walter Charlie	Michael O'Herlihy	
1969	Crooks and Coronets	Marty Miller	Jim O'Connolly	
1969	The Wild Bunch	Lyle Gorch	Sam Peckinpah	
1969	Lanton Mills	Gunman	Terrence Malick	Short film
1970	Barquero	Jake Remy	Gordon Douglas	
1970	There Was a Crooked Man...	Floyd Moon	Joseph L. Mankiewicz	
1971	Two-Lane Blacktop	G.T.O.	Monte Hellman	
1971	The Hired Hand	Arch Harris	Peter Fonda	
1971	Chandler	Chandler	Paul Magwood	
1973	The Thief Who Came to Dinner	Dave Reilly	Bud Yorkin	
1973	Tom Sawyer	Muff Potter	Don Taylor	
1973	Kid Blue	Reese Ford	James Frawley	
1973	Dillinger	John Dillinger	John Milius	
1973	Badlands	Mr. Sargis	Terrence Malick	
1974	The White Dawn	Billy	Philip Kaufman	
1974	Cockfighter	Frank Mansfield	Monte Hellman	
1974	Bring Me the Head of Alfredo Garcia	Bennie	Sam Peckinpah	
1975	Rancho Deluxe	Harmonica Player	Frank Perry	Uncredited cameo
1975	Race with the Devil	Frank Stewart	Jack Starrett	
1975	92 in the Shade	Nichol Dance	Thomas McGuane	
1976	Dixie Dynamite	Mack	Lee Frost	
1976	Drum	Hammond Maxwell	Steve Carver	
1977	Prime Time a.k.a. American Raspberry	Celebrity Sportsman	Bradley R. Swirnoff	
1977	Sleeping Dogs	Col. Willoughby	Roger Donaldson	
1978	China 9, Liberty 37	Matthew Sebanek	Monte Hellman	
1978	The Brink's Job	'Specs' O'Keefe	William Friedkin	
1979	1941	Col. 'Madman' Maddox	Steven Spielberg	
1981	Stripes	Sgt. Hulka	Ivan Reitman	
1982	The Border	'Red'	Tony Richardson	
1983	Blue Thunder	Cpt. Jack Braddock	John Badham	Posthumous releases
1983	Tough Enough	James Neese	Richard Fleischer	Posthumous releases

=== Television ===
==== Television series ====
- 1956 The United States Steel Hour ("Operation Three R's") as Private Lear
- 1956 The Big Story ("Reunion") as Danny (Adult)
- 1957 Kraft Television Theatre ("Gun at a Fair One") as Milkman
- 1956–1958 Westinghouse Studio One as 2nd Card Player
- 1958–1967 Gunsmoke as Al Tresh / Chris Kelly / Deke Bassop / Speeler / Lafe / Tate Crocker / Billy 'Sweet Billy' Cathcart / Jep Galloway / Jed Hakes / Seth Pickett
- 1958–1961 Wanted Dead or Alive as Jesse Cox / Billy Clegg / George Aswell / Clem Robinson. Note: wrongly credited as "Warren Oats" as Jesse Cox in "Die by the Gun," Season 1, Episode 14, first aired 12/6/1958.
- 1958 Rescue 8 ("Subterranean City") as Pete
- 1958 The Adventures of Rin-Tin-Tin ("The Epidemic") as Deke
- 1958 Playhouse 90 ("Seven Against The Wall") as Ted Ryan
- 1958 Black Saddle ("Client: Steele") as Deputy Simms
- 1958–1960 Tombstone Territory as Joe Clinton / Bob Pickett / Vic Reel
- 1958–1960 Have Gun – Will Travel as John Bosworth / Harrison
- 1959 Buckskin ("Charlie, My Boy") as Charlie
- 1959 The Rough Riders ("The Rifle") as Frank Day
- 1959 Trackdown as 'Lute' Borden / Kelly Hooker / Deputy Norvil
- 1959 Wagon Train ("The Martha Barham Story") as Private Silas Carpenter
- 1959 The Rebel ("School Days") as Troy Armbruster
- 1959 The Rifleman S2 E2 "Bloodlines" as Jud
- 1959–1961 Bat Masterson as Sonny Parsons / 'Cat' Crail
- 1960 Hotel de Paree ("Hard Luck for Sundance") as Charlie Aiken
- 1960 Bronco ("Every Man a Hero") as Private Hurd Maple
- 1960–1965 Rawhide as Marco / Charlie 'Rabbit' Waters / Weed / Jesse Gufler
- 1960 Johnny Ringo ("Single Debt"), as Burt Scanlon
- 1960 Tate ("Before Sunup) as Cowpoke
- 1960 Wrangler ("Affair at the Trading Post") as Shep Martin
- 1960 Outlaws ("Thirty a Month") as Bill Hooton
- 1960 The Westerner ("Jeff") as Drunk
- 1960 Lawman ("The Second Son") as Al May
- 1960 Hawaiian Eye ("The Contenders") as Al
- 1960 Michael Shayne ("Murder 'Round My Wrist") as Frank Hobbes
- 1960 The Case of the Dangerous Robin ("Baubles and Bullets") as Unknown
- 1961–1962 Target: The Corruptors! ("Mr. Megalomania" and "Journey into Mourning") as Unknown
- 1961 Bat Masterson ("Members of Mimbres") as 'Cat' Craig, JB Villain
- 1961 Laramie ("Two for the Gallows") as Pete Dixson
- 1961 Stagecoach West as Billy Joe / Trooper Haig / Tom Lochlin
- 1961 The Lawless Years ("Artie Moon") as Charlie Brown
- 1961 The Dick Powell Show ("Somebody's Waiting") as Bruno
- 1958–1962 The Rifleman ("The Day of Reckoning", "The Marshall", "Bloodlines", "The Prodigal") as Willie Breen / Andrew Sheltin / Jed Malakie
- 1960–1962 Thriller ("Knock Three-One-Two" & "The Hollow Watcher") as Unknown
- 1960–1962 77 Sunset Strip as 'Dink' Strahman / Orville
- 1962 Bonanza ("The Mountain Girl") as Paul Magruder
- 1962 The Untouchables ("Pressure") as Artie Krebs
- 1962–1963 Stoney Burke as Ves Painter (Oates' only regular role on a television series)
- 1963 The Twilight Zone "The Purple Testament" & "The 7th Is Made Up of Phantoms" as Unknown
- 1963 The Travels of Jaimie McPheeters ("The Day of the First Suitor") as Eldon Bishop
- 1963–1966 The Virginian as Corbie / Roy Judd / Bowers / Buxton
- 1964 Combat! ("The Pillbox") as Soldier Stark
- 1964 The Outer Limits ("The Mutant") as Reese Fowler
- 1964 The Fugitive ("Devil's Carnival" & "Rat in a Corner") as Hanes McClure / Herbie Grant
- 1964 The Reporter ("No Comment") as Mickroe
- 1965 Bob Hope Presents the Chrysler Theatre ("The War" & "Eric Kurtz") as Joe Grover
- 1965 Branded ("Judge Not") as Pierce / Frank
- 1965 A Man Called Shenandoah ("The Fort") as Sergeant Ryder
- 1965 Slattery's People as Eugene Henson / Stu Burns
- 1965 12 O'Clock High as Lieutenant Colonel Troper
- 1965 Lost in Space ("Welcome Stranger") as Jimmy Hapgood
- 1965–1966 The Big Valley as Korby Kyles / Duke
- 1966 The Monroes as Nick Beresford
- 1966 Shane as Kemp Spicer
- 1967 Dundee and the Culhane as Lafe Doolin
- 1967 Iron Horse as Hode Avery
- 1967 Cimarron Strip as Mobeetie
- 1968 Run for Your Life as Deputy Potter
- 1968 Disneyland as John Blythe
- 1969–1970 Lancer as Sheriff Val Crawford / Drago
- 1971 The F.B.I. as Richie Billings
- 1971 The Name of the Game as John Lew Weatherford
- 1973 Police Story as Richey Neptune
- 1979 Insight as Unknown
- 1985 Tales of the Unexpected as Harry (filmed in 1981; released posthumously; final role)

==== Television films and miniseries ====
Year	Title	Role	Notes
1968	Something for a Lonely Man	Angus Duren	
1970	The Movie Murderer	Alfred Fisher	
1971	The Reluctant Heroes of Hill 656	Corporal Leroy Sprague	
1977	The African Queen	Captain Charlie Allnut	
1978	True Grit: A Further Adventure	Rooster Cogburn	
1979	Black Beauty	Jerry Barker	TV Mini-Series
1979	And Baby Makes Six	Michael Kramer	
1979	My Old Man	Frank Butler	
1980	Baby Comes Home	Michael Kramer	
1981	East of Eden	Cyrus Trask	
1982	The Blue and the Gray	Maj. "Preacher" Welles	Posthumous release

== Awards and nominations ==
Institution	Year	Category	Work	Result
National Society of Film Critics	1972	Best Supporting Actor	Two-Lane Blacktop, The Hired Hand	Nominated
New York Film Critics Circle	1971	Best Supporting Actor	Two-Lane Blacktop, The Hired Hand	Nominated
Western Heritage Awards	1963	Fictional Television Drama	Stoney Burke ("The Contender")	Won
