= The Hired Hand =

1971 film by Peter Fonda

- Theatrical film poster
- Directed by: Peter Fonda
- Written by: Alan Sharp
- Produced by: William Hayward
- Starring: Peter Fonda; Warren Oates; Verna Bloom
- Cinematography: Vilmos Zsigmond
- Edited by: Frank Mazzola
- Music by: Bruce Langhorne
- Production company: The Pando Company
- Distributed by: Universal Pictures
- Release dates: June 16, 1971 (Des Moines, premiere); August 11, 1971 (U.S.)
- Running time: 93 minutes
- Country: United States
- Language: English
- Budget: $1 million (estimate)

The Hired Hand is a 1971 American Western film directed by Peter Fonda in his directorial debut, from a screenplay by Alan Sharp. The film stars Fonda, Warren Oates, and Verna Bloom. The story is about a man returning to his abandoned wife after seven years of drifting from job to job throughout the Southwestern United States. The embittered woman will only let him stay if he agrees to move in as a hired hand.

Upon release, the film received a mixed critical response and was a financial failure. In 1973, the film was shown on NBC-TV in an expanded version, but soon drifted into obscurity. In 2001, a fully restored version was shown at various film festivals, gaining strong critical praise, and it was released by the Sundance Channel on DVD. It is now considered a classic Western of the period.

== Plot ==
Harry Collings and Arch Harris are two saddle tramps who have spent seven years wandering through the American Southwest. Along with a younger companion, Dan Griffen, while fishing they catch the corpse of a small white child from a river. Harry returns the body to the water and it is swept away. The three of them stop off in Del Norte, a ramshackle town in the middle of nowhere that, unbeknownst to the trio, is run by a corrupt boss named Sam McVey.

Arch and Dan discuss traveling to California to look for work when Harry abruptly informs them that he has grown weary of purposeless wandering and has decided to return to his home, wife, and daughter that he had left seven years before. Dan leaves the two outside the bar and goes back in to buy another bottle of alcohol. McVey covets Dan's horse and concocts with his thugs a conspiracy to shoot him dead to possess it.

Elsewhere and unseen by Harry and Arch, McVey murders Dan, later using the justification story of Dan portrayed as a rapist. Harry and Arch ostensibly accept the tale and leave the town to bury their friend, but they return at dawn seeking revenge. Harry shoots the sleeping murderer McVey in both feet, crippling him. Harry and Arch escape with Dan's horse.

After riding hundreds of miles back to his abandoned family, Harry receives a cold welcome from his wife Hannah Collings. In order to be allowed to stay, he and Arch offer their services simply as more in a series of "hired hand(s)". Hannah agrees and quickly puts them to work. In a solitary moment, Arch implies his interest in Hannah. Gradually, the distrust and unease caused by years of estrangement slip away, and the married couple begin to become close again. For the first time, Harry feels willing to settle down, but Arch feels himself an impediment to the reunited couple's happiness and leaves, saying that he would like "to see the ocean".

McVey and his troupe of hooligans interrupt Harry's newly restored family life. Learning from a messenger of McVey that they have kidnapped Arch and are mutilating him, Harry leaves Hannah again - this time to save his friend. In a brutal shootout with McVey's gang, all of the villains are killed, but also, Harry is fatally wounded.

In an epilogue scene, Hannah watches as Arch rides up alone to the farm with a second unmounted horse in tow. Arch places the horses in the barn and he too enters the barn, taking up residence as a "hired hand".

== Cast ==
- Peter Fonda as Harry Collings
- Warren Oates as Arch Harris
- Verna Bloom as Hannah Collings
- Robert Pratt as Dan Griffen
- Severn Darden as Sam McVey
- Rita Rogers as Mexican Woman
- Ann Doran as Mrs. Sorenson
- Ted Markland as Luke
- Owen Orr as Mace
- Al Hopson as Bartender
- Megan Denver as Janey Collings
- Michael McClure as Ed Plummer
- Gray Johnson as Will
- Larry Hagman as Sheriff (TV version only)

== Production ==
Due to the huge financial success of Easy Rider (1969), which Fonda co-wrote, produced and starred in, Universal Studios gave him full artistic control over The Hired Hand, his debut as a director. Universal also did the same for Dennis Hopper with The Last Movie that year, part of a larger project from the studio to give young filmmakers a $1,000,000 budget, and total creative control (Universal did the same for Douglas Trumbull, who made Silent Running, Monte Hellman for Two-Lane Blacktop, and George Lucas, who created American Graffiti).

The film was shot in New Mexico in the summer of 1970 with a budget of slightly less than $1,000,000. As he later discussed, Fonda was supported as a neophyte filmmaker by the cast of polished character actors, headed by Warren Oates. In addition, cinematographer Vilmos Zsigmond provided a high quality of naturalistic imagery. Zsigmond credited this film as his first major assignment in feature film: "... Before that ['The Hired Hand'], I basically did commercials. 'The Hired Hand' was probably the first time that I [as a cinematographer] actually had a dramatic story with good actors...." Fonda's selection of the then-unknown Bruce Langhorne as the film's musical composer was rewarded, as nearly all the film's reviews singled out the score as being unusually expressive and beautiful.

Frank Mazzola edited the film, using a series of complex and poetic montages, which featured elaborate dissolves, slow motion and overlapping still photography. Mazzola's opening montage was praised by several critics as the film's most memorable sequence.

== Release ==
Fonda recalled "Universal was going to put up a billboard on Sunset Blvd., showing me without a shirt, wearing a cowboy hat and a pistol stuffed in my pants. The billboard was going to say something like, THAT EASY RIDER RIDES AGAIN!' I went to Universal and said you take that down or I'll take it down. I was prepared to take it down with explosives... They paid themselves a hefty fee upfront to distribute my film. I didn't see a pickass dime... At least I got them to take the billboard down."

=== Television version ===
When NBC-TV first aired The Hired Hand in 1973, they reinstated twenty minutes of footage that Fonda had deleted from the theatrical cut as "extraneous". Glenn Erickson has argued that the previously missing footage is very important to the film's narrative, noting that "writer Alan Sharp created a pressing reason for Oates' character to take his leave", and further opined that these twenty minutes helped make The Hired Hand more strongly resemble "a standard film with a story, events, dialogue and character interaction." The most substantial excision involved the death of Ed Plummer (Michael McClure), and the subsequent homicide investigation by the local sheriff (Larry Hagman). For the 2001 restoration, Fonda again removed the footage. All 20 minutes have been added to the Sundance DVD as an extra.

=== Home media ===
The Sundance Channel released a DVD of the film in two separate editions in 2001. In 2018, the film was released on Blu-Ray by Arrow Films.

== Reception ==
The Hired Hand received generally mixed reviews, with some critics dismissing The Wife of Martin Guerre-like film as a "hippie-western." Variety felt the film had "a disjointed story, a largely unsympathetic hero, and an obtrusive amount of cinematic gimmickry which renders inarticulate the confused story subtleties." Time described it as "pointless, virtually plotless, all but motionless and a lode of pap." But Roger Greenspun of The New York Times praised it as a "rather ambitious simple movie, with a fairly elaborate technique and levels of meaning rising to the mystical, which seems so much a part of the very contemporary old West." Jay Cocks wrote that the film was "a fine, elegiac western."

Despite Universal's hopes for another Easy Rider-sized youth hit, The Hired Hand was a commercial flop. It was sold to NBC-TV for subsequent television showings in 1973, when the majority of the film's fans first saw the movie. After that, it became difficult to see, rarely repeated on television and playing only occasionally at film festivals over the years. In 2001, the film was fully restored and exhibited at a number of festivals to a generally enthusiastic critical response.

The film is now well regarded as a minor western classic, with a 91% favorable rating on Rotten Tomatoes based on 11 reviews. Bill Kauffman has called it "a lovely meditation on friendship and responsibility, one of the least-known great movies of that richest of all cinematic eras, the early 1970s." Phil Hardy's The Aurum Film Encyclopedia: The Western opined the film was "beautifully photographed by Zsigmond...a superb evocation of the rigours and essential aimlessness of frontier life."

In a positive retrospective review and interview with Hawk Koch for the film's 50th anniversary on Senses of Cinema, Mark Lager agreed with director Martin Scorsese's assessment of the film and praised it as "contemplative, poetic, and reflective, displaying a depth of emotion and maturity that was not present in the American western genre before 1971."

=== Accolades ===
Institution	Year	Category	Nominee	Result
National Society of Film Critics	1972	Best Supporting Actor	Warren Oates	2nd place
New York Film Critics Circle	1971	Best Supporting Actor	Warren Oates	2nd place

== See also ==
- List of American films of 1971
