= 92 in the Shade =

1975 film

- Film Poster
- Directed by: Thomas McGuane
- Written by: Thomas McGuane
- Produced by: Georges Pappas
- Starring: Peter Fonda; Warren Oates; Margot Kidder; Burgess Meredith; Joe Spinell
- Cinematography: Michael C. Butler
- Edited by: Ed Rothkowitz
- Music by: Michael J. Lewis
- Distributed by: United Artists
- Release date: August 29, 1975
- Running time: 88 minutes
- Country: United States
- Language: English

92 in the Shade is a 1975 American drama film written and directed by Thomas McGuane, based on his 1973 novel of the same name. It stars Peter Fonda, Warren Oates, Elizabeth Ashley, Harry Dean Stanton, and Margot Kidder.

== Plot ==
In Key West, Florida, Tom Skelton is a local young man who would like to become a professional fishing guide. When guide Nichol Dance gets himself arrested, Tom volunteers to cover his charters until he gets out of jail.

While on a charter with a couple, Tom wades into mangroves to free an entangled fish. When he returns to the boat, the couple have disappeared. After a fruitless search, he returns to find the charter was a prank that Dance and another captain named Carter orchestrated. Skelton retaliates by burning Dance's brand-new boat.

Tom's grandfather, a lawyer named Goldsboro, keeps Tom out of jail and Dance from suing him. He agrees to stake Tom the money to commission a custom motorized skiff for his own charter business.

== Cast ==
- Peter Fonda as Tom Skelton
- Warren Oates as Nicholas Dance
- Margot Kidder as Miranda
- Harry Dean Stanton as Faron Carter
- Elizabeth Ashley as Jeannie Carter
- Burgess Meredith as Goldsboro
- John Heffernan as Myron
- William Hickey as Mr. Skelton, Tom's father
- Louise Latham as Mrs. Skelton, Tom's mother
- Sylvia Miles as Bella
- John Quade as Roy
- Joe Spinell as Ollie Slatt

== Production ==
Thomas McGuane directed the film and wrote the script. He was married to one of the film's female stars and had a scandalous affair with the other, as detailed in Elizabeth Ashley's autobiography Actress: Postcards from the Road.

The film is known for having two different versions, each with different endings. One has a happy ending in which Dance and Skelton fight while they're in the boat and Dance's gun gets thrown in the water, and then they both agree to stop their fight and become friends, but other version has darker ending in which Dance shoots and kills Skelton. In the book Warren Oates: A Wild Life by Susan Compo, Peter Fonda said there was another third ending which was filmed, but which was never used in any version of the film:

When we were coming to do the ending of 92 in the Shade, Warren and I tried to figure out what was going to happen, because the beginning didn't start off properly. McGuane had written it very specifically, where I get shot. I get the surprise of my life. And Warren didn't want to shoot me because he liked me too much. I said "Warren, that's offscreen. This is onscreen." We ended up shooting two (actually three) endings, one where we struggle for the gun, and we throw it in the water, and we end up hugging each other and laughing and laughing. And another one where he shoots me, and i die in the boat, and he gets out of the boat and walks ashore. And the third one, we both look at the gun, we throw the gun away, both of us get out of the boat and walk to shore.

Fonda said he was "not exactly thrilled with" the film saying "I hoped it would turn out to be a better film. I like it in some ways... I'm not happy with the editing and some of the music. You know, it was a film I very much wanted to produce myself, but Eliot Kastner got his hands on the property and produced it. I'm not crazy about Kastner. You see, after he gets a project off the ground, he usually doesn't give a rat's ass about it".

== Release ==
Although the film was a box-office failure, a January 1976 review in The New York Times described it as "more satisfying" than Rancho Deluxe another 1975 film written by Thomas McGuane. In 2013, film critic James Cathcart stated, "...there’s a particular charm I find in a film that only reveals its merits once a viewer accepts its flaws".

== See also ==
- List of American films of 1975
