= Revisionist Western =

Western film subgenre

The revisionist Western is a sub-genre of the Western fiction. Called a post-classical variation of the traditional Western or simply 'postwestern', the revisionist subverts the myth and romance of the traditional by means of character development and realism to present a less simplistic view of life in the "Old West". While the traditional Western always embodies a clear boundary between good and evil, the revisionist Western does not.

In filmmaking, revisionist themes have existed since the early 20th century but it was not until 1968, when the Hays Code restrictions were relaxed, that revisionism finally supplanted the traditional. Although many earlier Westerns are labelled as revisionist, the distinction between them is often blurred by variable themes and plot devices. Some are labelled psychological Westerns, which is closely related to and sometimes overlaps with the psychological drama and psychological thriller genres because of their focus on character, at the expense of the action and thrills that predominate in the traditional. Other revisionist films, in which action and adventure remain prominent, are labelled Indian Westerns or outlaw/gunfighter Westerns because, instead of the traditional hero, the protagonist is a Native American, an outlaw, or a gunfighter. The term anti-Western is generally used in reference to particularly gruesome and/or nihilistic examples of the genre, such as Cormac McCarthy’s 1985 novel Blood Meridian. The spaghetti Westerns of the 1960s, not bound by the Hays Code, were strongly revisionist by presenting morally ambiguous stories featuring an anti-hero or a sympathetic villain. From 1969, revisionism has prevailed in Western film production.

== Concept ==
The traditional Western typically features a strong male lead character, often a lawman or cavalry officer, who takes direct action on behalf of supposedly civilized people against those deemed to be uncivilized (see also: Civilizing mission). The former are portrayed as honest townsfolk or travelers, and the latter as outlaws or hostile Native Americans.

In the revisionist Western, the traditional format and themes are subverted by such devices as the Native American protagonist; strong female characters; the outlaw protagonist; plots that are pre-eminently concerned with survival in a wild environment; or the presentation of a morally ambiguous storyline without definite heroes, these often featuring the so-called anti-hero or a sympathetic villain. The object is to blur the traditionally clear boundaries between right and wrong (the good guy against the bad guy) by emphasizing the need for survival amidst ambiguity.

The traditional Western treats characters in simplistic terms as good or bad with minimal character development. The psychological Western, which began in the 1940s and was hugely popular through the 1950s and 1960s, prioritizes character development ahead of action whilst retaining most of the traditional aspects. For the most part, the psychological Western morphed into the revisionist Western as censorship restrictions were relaxed and removed in the 1960s.

Shane (1953), directed by George Stevens, is a psychological Western. The title character (Alan Ladd) seems at first to be a traditional Western drifter riding across a traditional Western landscape but it is soon apparent that he has entered a complex setting which is populated by, as Kim Newman puts it, "believable characters with mixed motives". Even though rancher Ryker (Emile Meyer) is ostensibly the villain of the piece, he makes the point that he has striven for thirty years to develop the cattle range which is now being taken over by fence-building "sodbusters", many of whom have the mixed motives noted by Newman. Despite the complexity of its characters, Shane is nevertheless filmed in a conventional setting and ends with the hero outshooting and killing the three main villains. There is, however, an element of revisionism in the ending when the disillusioned Shane admits to Ryker that he knows his day as a gunfighter is over. Shane rides away to an uncertain future, possibly to die (he is wounded), and it is farmer Starrett (Van Heflin) and his family who endure.

Fifteen years after Stevens's Shane, Sergio Leone directed Once Upon a Time in the West, a revisionist Western which completely subverts the traditional with complex characters and multiple plot devices, the key one being revenge – the motive of enigmatic gunfighter Harmonica (Charles Bronson). As in Shane, it is not the gunfighters who "inherit the West" but in this case the compassionate town-building ex-prostitute Jill (Claudia Cardinale). By the end of the film, all of the antagonists except Harmonica are dead and, like Shane, he rides away to an uncertain future.

== Development ==
Opinion is divided on the origin of the revisionist or psychological Western but it is generally agreed that there were hints of a darker perspective in some films of the 1930s such as Westward Ho (1935), directed by Robert N. Bradbury and starring John Wayne, in which the hero leads a band of vigilantes on a quest for revenge. Westward Ho is the earliest film in AllMovie's list of revisionist Westerns. The earliest films classified by AllMovie as psychological Westerns are The Ox-Bow Incident and The Outlaw (both 1943).

The Outlaw/Gunfighter sub-genre focused on outlaws and gunfighters as human beings rather than using them as stock characters, often dressed in black, as in traditional Westerns. The aim was to examine the impact of gunfights on the participants by revealing their neuroses and redeeming characteristics. AllMovie's earliest films of this type are two silents: The Road Agent (1926), directed by J. P. McGowan and starring Al Hoxie; and Jesse James (1927), directed by Lloyd Ingraham and starring Fred Thomson.

In a similar vein, the Indian Western seeks to reverse negative stereotypes by sympathetic portrayal of Native Americans who, in the traditional Western, are nearly always the enemy of the "heroic" white settlers and cavalry. In the Indian Western, roles can be reversed with peaceful Native Americans driven to fight against white aggression. Usually, however, the Native American hero or heroine is played by brownface whites such as Burt Lancaster and Jean Peters in Apache (1954). In Dances With Wolves, the female lead was Mary McDonnell playing a white who had been raised by the Lakota. There had been earlier films which portrayed Native Americans sympathetically, but the breakthrough for this sub-genre was Broken Arrow (1950), directed by Delmer Daves and starring James Stewart, with Jeff Chandler as Cochise. Kim Newman wrote that Chandler's performance established Cochise as "the 1950s model of an Indian hero" and the film inspired goodwill to other Native American chiefs such as Sitting Bull, Crazy Horse and Geronimo – as a result, "it became fashionable for Westerns to be pro-Indian".

Many of the films were produced in the 1950s during the milieu of McCarthyism and attempted to strike back against blacklisting of the film industry at that time, notably High Noon (1952) starring Gary Cooper. By the time of the loosening, and later abandonment, of the restrictive Hays Code in the 1960s, many directors of the New Hollywood generation such as Sam Peckinpah, George Roy Hill, and Robert Altman focused on the Western and each produced their own classics in the genre, including Peckinpah's The Wild Bunch (1969), Hill's Butch Cassidy and the Sundance Kid (1969), and Altman's McCabe & Mrs. Miller (1971).

Meanwhile, European directors such as Sergio Leone and Sergio Corbucci had been making Western films unencumbered by American expectations nor Hays Code inspired censorship, and these spaghetti Westerns also provided a new perspective on the Western genre. Early examples of this sub-genre are Leone's A Fistful of Dollars, starring Clint Eastwood, and Corbucci's Minnesota Clay, starring Cameron Mitchell, both made in 1964.

The revisionist and psychological Westerns have been carried forward from their own standard settings into the neo-Western, a notable of which is the Coen brothers' No Country for Old Men (2007), based on the work of Cormac McCarthy, an author known for writing revisionist Western literature, such as the novel Blood Meridian.

== Spaghetti Westerns ==
European countries, which had imported Western productions since their silent film inception, began creating their own versions and, in 1964, Sergio Leone's A Fistful of Dollars became an international hit initiating the spaghetti Western formula. Although they were mostly shot in Spanish locations, featured U.S. actors, and were co-produced by European and U.S. producers, many of the most successful directors were Italian, resulting in these films being known by the misnomer Spaghetti Western. Leone is often credited with initiating the growth of these co-produced European Westerns as he played a seminal role due to the financial success of A Fistful of Dollars. Film scholar Austin Fisher notes that Italian directors such as Damiano Damiani, Sergio Sollima and Sergio Corbucci, in responding to international and national events, chose the Western as a way to represent Leftist doctrine in the second half of the 1960s, interpreting the conflict between Mexico and the U.S. through the lens of Italian politics. Leone popularized the morally ambivalent gunfighter through his representation of "The Man with No Name," Clint Eastwood's gritty anti-hero who was copied again and again in Spaghetti Westerns in characters such as Django and Ringo and which came to be one of its universal attributes.

== Counterculture ==
Beginning in the late 1960s, independent filmmakers produced revisionist and hallucinogenic films, later retroactively identified as the separate but related subgenre of "acid Westerns," that radically turn the usual trappings of the Western genre inside out to critique both capitalism and the counterculture. Monte Hellman's The Shooting and Ride in the Whirlwind (1966), Alejandro Jodorowsky's El Topo (1970), Roland Klick's Deadlock (1970), Robert Downey Sr.'s Greaser's Palace (1972), Alex Cox's Walker (1987), and Jim Jarmusch's Dead Man (1995) fall into this category. Films made during the early 1970s are particularly noted for their hyper-realistic photography and production design. Other films, such as those directed by Clint Eastwood, were made by professionals familiar with the Western as a criticism and expansion against and beyond the genre. Eastwood's The Outlaw Josey Wales (1976) and Unforgiven (1992) made use of strong supporting roles for women and Native Americans.

== List of revisionist Western films ==
This list is not exhaustive. It includes major films labelled revisionist Western, anti-Western, psychological Western, Indian Western, outlaw Western, gunfighter Western, or spaghetti Western. By 1970, revisionism had supplanted the traditional as the predominant Western sub-genre and so the list highlights the films released until then to illustrate the development of the concept.

=== 1901–50 ===
- The Great Train Robbery (1903)
- The Road Agent (1926)
- Jesse James (1927)
- Law and Order (1932)
- The Outlaw Tamer (1935)
- Outlaw Rule (1935)
- Outlawed Guns (1935)
- Westward Ho (1935)
- Outlaws of Sonora (1938)
- Heritage of the Desert (1939)
- Jesse James (1939)
- Outlaws' Paradise (1939)
- The Desperadoes (1943)
- The Outlaw (1943)
- Outlaws of Stampede Pass (1943)
- The Ox-Bow Incident (1943)
- Outlaw Roundup (1944)
- The Daltons Ride Again (1945)
- Badman's Territory (1946)
- Gran Casino (1947)
- Gunfighters (1947)
- Jesse James Rides Again (1947)
- Pursued (1947)
- Adventures in Silverado (1948)
- Blood on the Moon (1948)
- The Man from Colorado (1948)
- Rachel and the Stranger (1948)
- Yellow Sky (1948)
- Bad Men of Tombstone (1949)
- Colorado Territory (1949)
- I Shot Jesse James (1949)
- Branded (1950)
- Broken Arrow (1950)
- Devil's Doorway (1950)
- The Furies (1950)
- The Gunfighter (1950)
- I Shot Billy the Kid (1950)
- Winchester '73 (1950)

=== 1951–55 ===
- The Great Missouri Raid (1951)
- Three Desperate Men (1951)
- The Battle at Apache Pass (1952)
- Bend of the River (1952)
- Duel at Silver Creek (1952)
- Hangman's Knot (1952)
- High Noon (1952)
- Hondo (1953)
- The Lawless Breed (1953)
- The Naked Spur (1953)
- Hannah Lee (1953)
- Shane (1953)
- War Arrow (1953)
- Apache (1954)
- Broken Lance (1954)
- The Far Country (1954)
- Johnny Guitar (1954)
- Silver Lode (1954)
- Vera Cruz (1954)
- The Kentuckian (1955)
- The Man From Laramie (1955)
- Man with the Gun (1955)
- Run for Cover (1955)
- Tribute to a Bad Man (1955)

=== 1956–60 ===
- Gunslinger (1956)
- Jubal (1956)
- The Last Hunt (1956)
- The Searchers (1956)
- Star in the Dust (1956)
- 3:10 to Yuma (1957)
- Decision at Sundown (1957)
- Forty Guns (1957)
- Gun Glory (1957)
- The Lonely Man (1957)
- Night Passage (1957)
- Oregon Passage (1957)
- Run of the Arrow (1957)
- The True Story of Jesse James (1957)
- The Bravados (1958)
- Buchanan Rides Alone (1958)
- Gun Fever (1958)
- The Left Handed Gun (1958)
- Man of the West (1958)
- Showdown at Boot Hill (1958)
- Terror in a Texas Town (1958)
- Day of the Outlaw (1959)
- Face of a Fugitive (1959)
- The Hanging Tree (1959)
- Last Train from Gun Hill (1959)
- No Name on the Bullet (1959)
- Warlock (1959)
- 13 Fighting Men (1960)
- Comanche Station (1960)
- The Magnificent Seven (1960)
- One Foot in Hell (1960)
- Sergeant Rutledge (1960)
- The Unforgiven (1960)

=== 1961–70 ===
- The Deadly Companions (1961)
- One-Eyed Jacks (1961)
- Two Rode Together (1961)
- Lonely Are the Brave (1962)
- The Man Who Shot Liberty Valance (1962)
- Ride the High Country (1962)
- A Fistful of Dollars (1964)
- Cheyenne Autumn (1964)
- Arizona Colt (1965)
- Arizona Raiders (1965)
- For a Few Dollars More (1965)
- The Glory Guys (1965)
- Apache Rifles (1966)
- Django (1966)
- El Dorado (1966)
- An Eye for an Eye (1966)
- The Good, the Bad and the Ugly (1966)
- Nevada Smith (1966)
- The Plainsman (1966)
- The Professionals (1966)
- Ride in the Whirlwind (1966)
- The Shooting (1966)
- Any Gun Can Play (1967)
- Bandidos (1967)
- Chuka (1967)
- Hombre (1967)
- Hour of the Gun (1967)
- Rough Night in Jericho (1967)
- The Way West (1967)
- Welcome to Hard Times (1967)
- Bandolero! (1968)
- Day of the Evil Gun (1968)
- The Desperados (1968)
- Firecreek (1968)
- The Great Silence (1968)
- Hang 'em High (1968)
- Once Upon a Time in the West (1968)
- Will Penny (1968)
- Butch Cassidy and the Sundance Kid (1969)
- Death of a Gunfighter (1969)
- Tell Them Willie Boy Is Here (1969)
- A Time for Dying (1969)
- The Wild Bunch (1969)
- Young Billy Young (1969)
- Barquero (1970)
- Little Big Man (1970)
- Monte Walsh (1970)
- Soldier Blue (1970)
- Deadlock (1970)

=== Later films ===
Subsequently, revisionist themes have prevailed in Western film production. Major releases from 1971 to the present include:

- Lawman (1971)
- McCabe & Mrs. Miller (1971)
- Jeremiah Johnson (1972)
- Chato's Land (1972)
- The Culpepper Cattle Co. (1972)
- The Great Northfield Minnesota Raid (1972)
- Joe Kidd (1972)
- The Life and Times of Judge Roy Bean (1972)
- Ulzana's Raid (1972)
- High Plains Drifter (1973)
- Pat Garrett and Billy the Kid (1973)
- Buffalo Bill and the Indians, or Sitting Bull's History Lesson (1976)
- The Outlaw Josey Wales (1976)
- The Long Riders (1980)
- Pale Rider (1985)
- Dances With Wolves (1990)
- Unforgiven (1992)
- The Ballad of Little Jo (1993)
- Geronimo: An American Legend (1993)
- Tombstone (1993)
- The Quick and the Dead (1995)
- 3:10 to Yuma (2007)
- The Assassination of Jesse James by the Coward Robert Ford (2007)
- Bury My Heart at Wounded Knee (2007)
- Meek's Cutoff (2010)
- True Grit (2010)
- Django Unchained (2012)
- A Girl Walks Home Alone at Night (2014)
- The Hateful Eight (2015)
- Brimstone (2016)
- Logan (2017)
- Hostiles (2017)
- Never Grow Old (2019)
- The Power of the Dog (2021)
- Killers of the Flower Moon (2023)
- The Settlers (2023)

== See also ==
- List of Western subgenres
- Portrayal of Native Americans in film
- Ostern

== Bibliography ==
- Newman, Kim (1990). Wild West Movies. London: Bloomsbury Publishing Ltd. ISBN 978-07-47507-47-5.
