= Steven Gaydos =

American songwriter

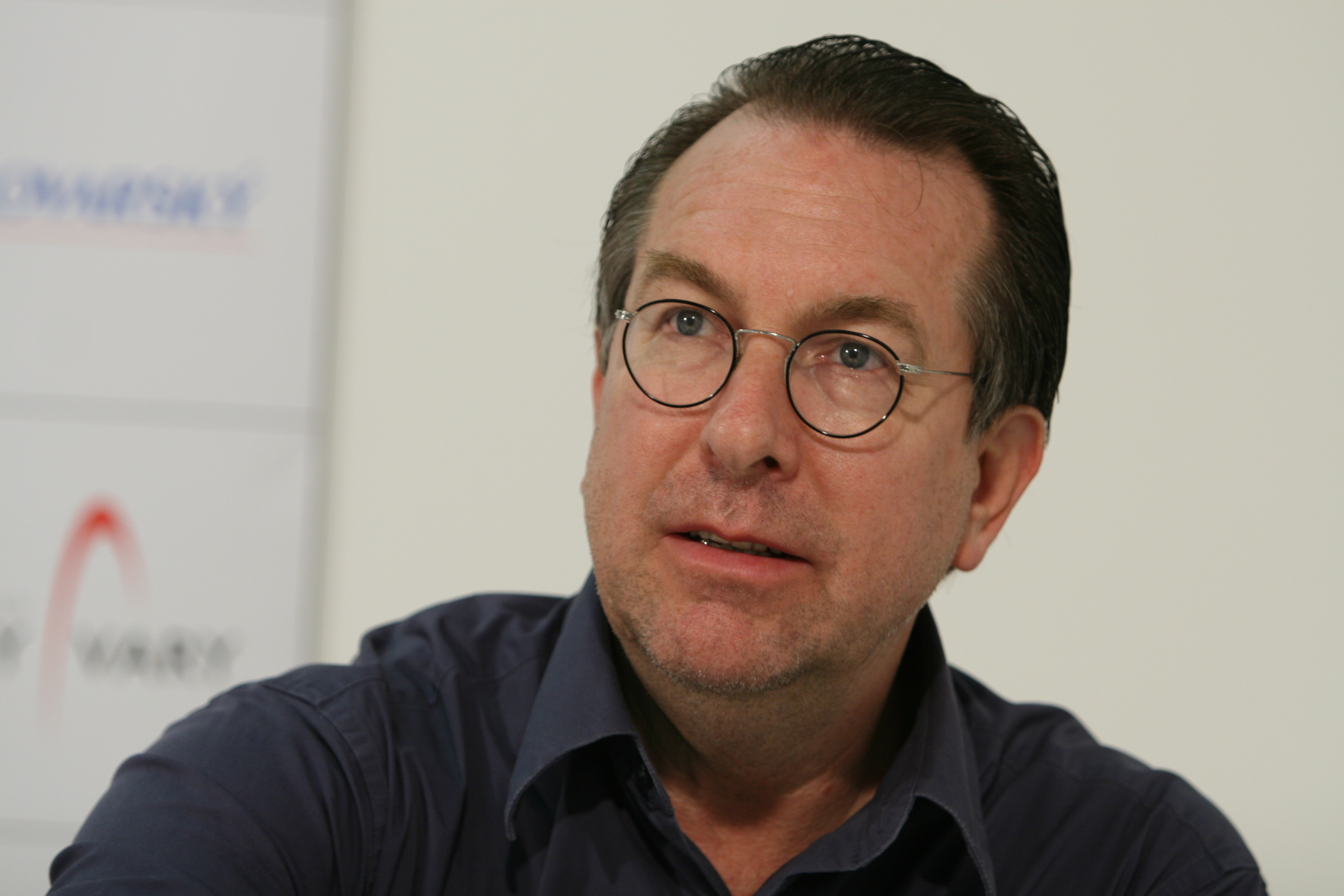
- Steven Gaydos in Karlovy Vary, 2008
- Born: United States
- Occupations: Journalist, screenwriter, songwriter
- Writing career
- Language: English
- Genres: Journalism, screenwriting, songwriting

Steven Gaydos is an American screenwriter, songwriter, and journalist.

== Works ==
Gaydos wrote the 2010 film Road to Nowhere, directed by independent filmmaker Monte Hellman. The film appeared on Sight & Sound and Film Comment's "Best Films of 2010" lists.

Gaydos has co-written several screenplays, including the 1988 Venice Film Festival prize-winner Iguana and Silent Night, Deadly Night III: Better Watch Out!, both directed by Hellman. He began his collaboration with Hellman as a production associate on the 1974 action-drama Cockfighter. The duo also worked on several unproduced projects such as adaptations of Jorge Semprún's The Second Death of Ramon Mercader, and Charles McCarry's spy thriller novel The Miernik Dossier.

Gaydos co-wrote Dutch filmmaker Ate de Jong's adaptation of Simone de Beauvoir's novel All Men Are Mortal and contributed to Dutch director Nouchka van Brakel’s One Month Later.

In addition to his produced screenplays, Gaydos co-authored several screenplays with Edgar and René Balcer,

His unproduced solo works include current projects Bring Me the Head of Sam Peckinpah and The Man Who Was Not With It, based upon the novel by Herbert Gold. In 2008, Gaydos received an award for his contributions to film culture from the Karlovy Vary International Film Festival.

Gaydos is also an entertainment journalist and co-author of several books in the entertainment industry, including Movie Talk From The Front Lines (McFarland) and Cannes: 50 Years of Sun, Sex and Celluloid (Miramax). He has appeared on American television and radio and in international media outlets such as the United Kingdom's BBC.

Gaydos became vice president and executive editor of Variety in 2013.

=== Screenplays ===
- One Month Later (co-writer) 1987
- Iguana 1988 (co-writer)
- Silent Night Deadly Night III: Better Watch Out! 1989 (co-writer)
- All Men Are Mortal 1995 (co-writer)
- Road to Nowhere 2010 (screenwriter-producer)

=== Books ===
- Movie Talk From The Frontlines (McFarland) 1995 ISBN 0786400056
- Variety Guide To Film Festivals (Perigee) 1998 ISBN 0399524428
- Cannes: 50 Years of Sun, Sex & Celluloid (Miramax) 1997 ISBN 0786882956

=== Music ===
- "Rain in the Drought" (co-writer with Mitch Moon)
- "More Than I Care To Remember" (co-writer with Terrence Dwyer)
- "Chicken of the County" (co-writer with Terrence Dwyer)
- "Mystery Dawn" (from the film, Deadly Virtues: Love. Honour. Obey, co-writer with Mitch Moon)
