= Millie Perkins =

American film and television actress (born 1936)

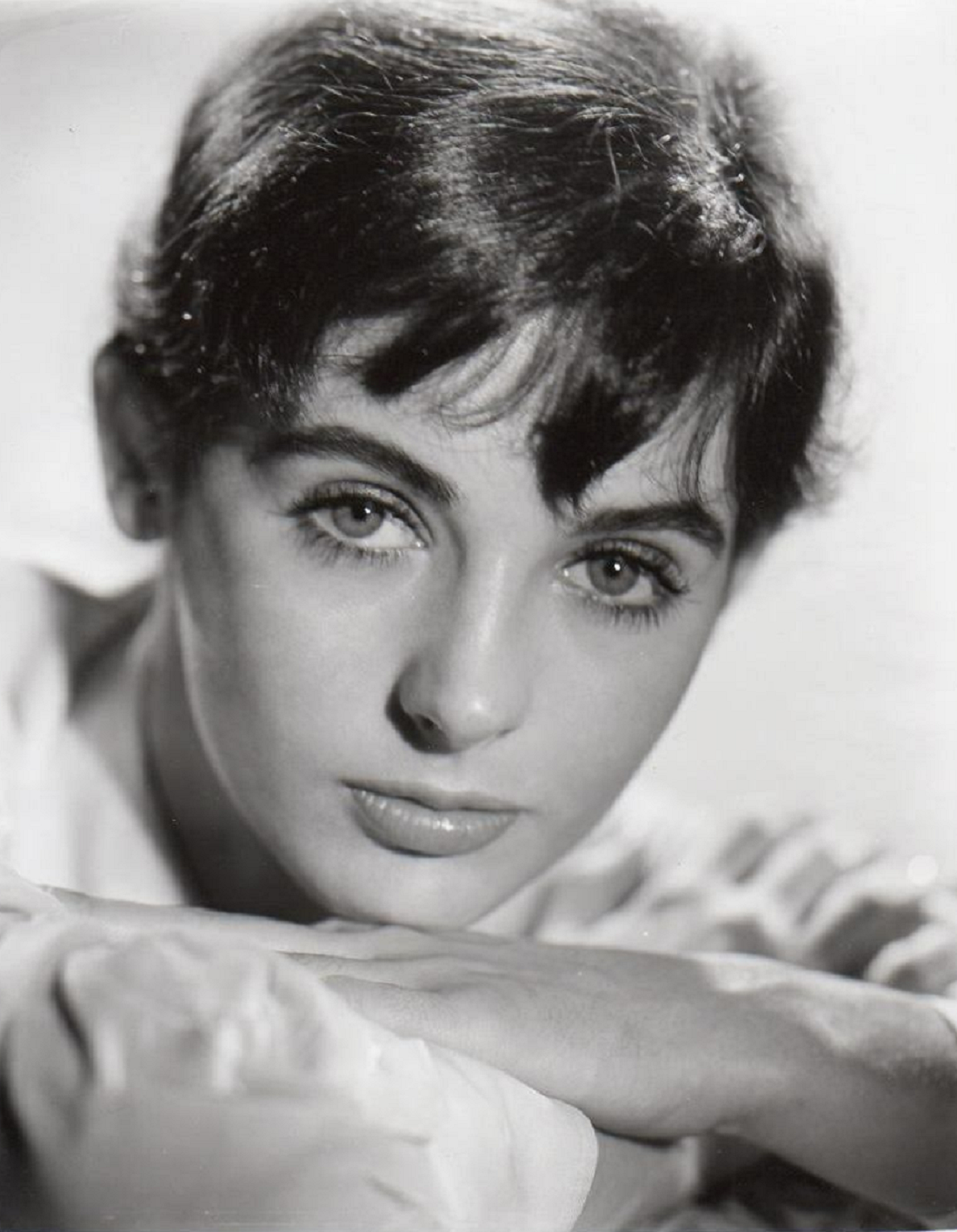
- Publicity photo (1959)
- Born: May 12, 1936 (age 90); Passaic, New Jersey, U.S.
- Education: Fair Lawn High School
- Occupation: Actress
- Years active: 1959–2006
- Known for: The Diary of Anne Frank; The Shooting; Ride in the Whirlwind; Wild in the Country; Wild in the Streets
- Spouses: Dean Stockwell (m. 1960; div. 1962); Robert Thom (m. 1964, died 1979)
- Children: 2

Millie Perkins (born May 12, 1936) is an American retired actress, known for her debut film role as Anne Frank in The Diary of Anne Frank (1959), and for her supporting actress roles in two 1966 Westerns, The Shooting and Ride in the Whirlwind, both directed by Monte Hellman.

== Early life and career ==
Born on May 12, 1936, in Passaic, New Jersey, Perkins grew up in Fair Lawn and attended Fair Lawn High School. Her father was a merchant marine captain of Austrian descent. Perkins was working as a receptionist at a New York City advertising agency when she caught the eye of a visiting photographer with a resultant career as a model; by 1958, Perkins was an international cover girl.

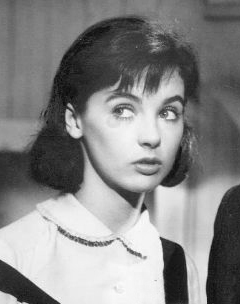
Perkins in The Diary of Anne Frank (1959)

Soon thereafter, Perkins was vigorously pursued, and then selected, to portray Dutch-Jewish diarist and Holocaust victim Anne Frank in the 1959 film adaptation of The Diary of Anne Frank. Perkins had never studied nor sought to be an actress, but director George Stevens saw her photo and tried to convince her to read for the part. Finally, she flew to Hollywood for a screen test, and with much fanfare, landed the role. In its 6 April 1959 issue, LIFE magazine offered a 7-page photo essay about her screen debut in the film, from voice-over recording to the New York premiere. Perkins received almost universally excellent reviews for her portrayal of Frank, including a Photoplay Award for Most Promising Female Star, although the film was less of a box-office success than expected.

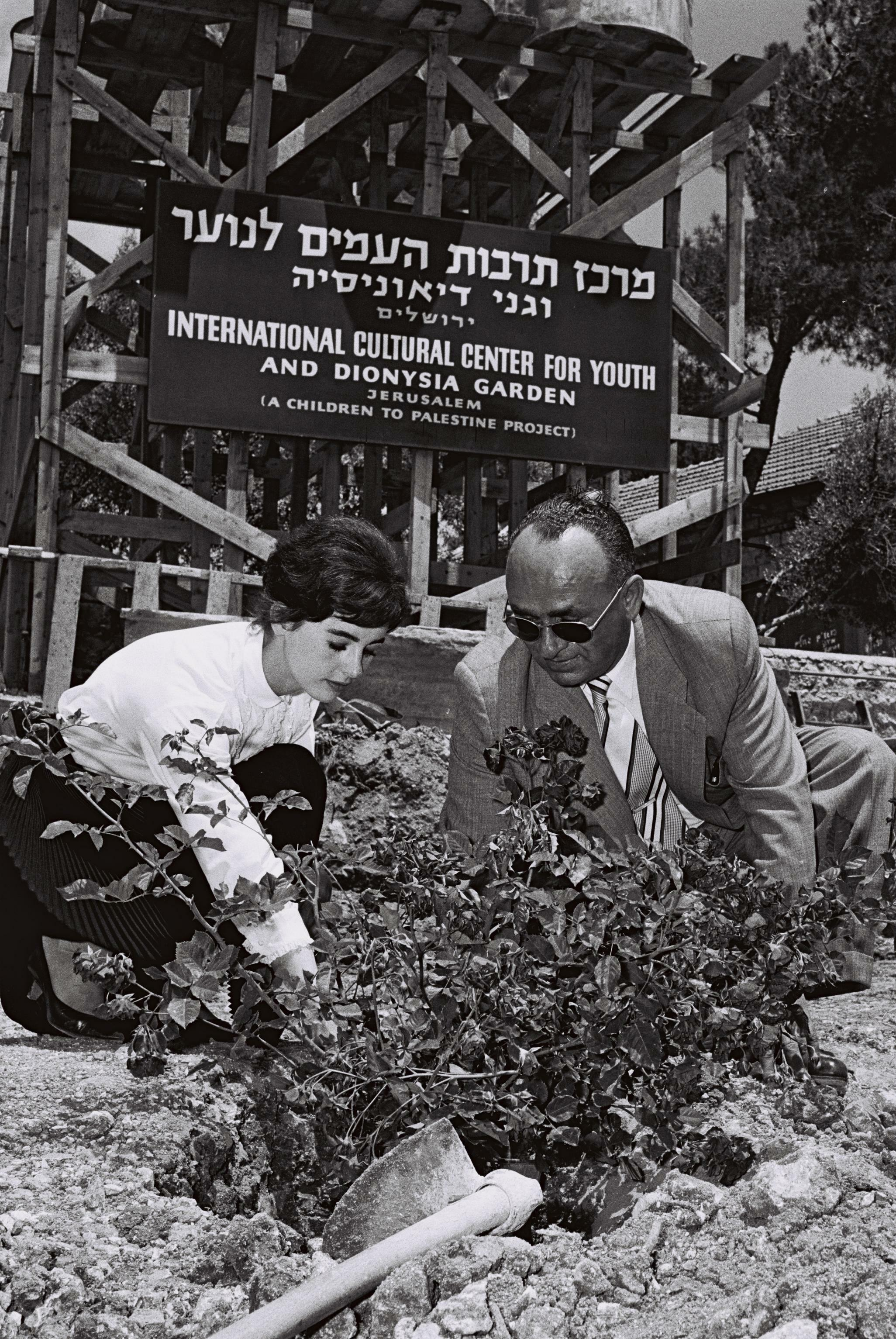
Perkins on a visit to Israel in 1959

After her work with George Stevens, Perkins was placed under contract to 20th Century Fox. She was one of the promising young stars of Hollywood, but the studio contract system, which was coming to an end, was a poor fit for Perkins, who had come of age with the Beat Generation in 1950s New York City. George Stevens would later state: "Millie did not fit in. She was 10 years too early." Suspended for refusing the lead in the 1960 film Tess of the Storm Country – Perkins saw the film as a B-picture and a step back career-wise – Perkins was cast by 20th Century Fox in the 1961 film Wild in the Country, playing the supporting role of the girlfriend to star Elvis Presley. She would later play Gladys Presley in the 1990 miniseries Elvis, after which the studio dropped Perkins. Joshua Logan personally selected Perkins for the female lead in the 1964 film Ensign Pulver, but the film was a failure. Perkins would not appear in another mainstream film release for almost 20 years. She played the female lead in both of Jack Nicholson's inaugural productions, The Shooting and Ride in the Whirlwind – shot side-by-side in 1965 – and in 1968 co-starred in Wild in the Streets which was written by her then-husband Robert Thom.

=== Later career ===
In 1976, Perkins moved to Jacksonville, Oregon, with her two daughters by Robert Thom, Lillie and Hedy; in 1977, People magazine reported that Perkins "conducts a drama-therapy workshop every Tuesday night in her living room and often speaks to high-school drama groups in the area." In 1982, it was reported that Perkins was teaching drama at Southern Oregon University.

In 1983, Perkins returned to feature films to play Jon Voight's ex-wife in Table for Five. She then played "mother roles" for the next 20 years; including Sean Penn's mother in the fact-based film At Close Range, the mother of Charlie Sheen's character in the 1987 movie Wall Street, the bereft Jewish mother in the 1996 film The Chamber, and Andy García's mother in the 2005 film The Lost City.

=== Television work ===
In 1961, Perkins made her television debut as a guest star on Wagon Train. As with her film work, her television appearances were sporadic until the 1980s, from when she appeared on a variety of television shows, including seven episodes of Knots Landing (over the period 1983–1990) and fourteen episodes of Any Day Now (1998–2002). She portrayed character Glenda Vandervere in Murder, She Wrote (season two, episode 12: "Murder by Appointment Only") (01/05/1986) and appeared in a 2006 six-episode arc on the television soap opera The Young and the Restless.

=== Retirement from acting ===
Perkins retired from acting after 2006.

=== Marriages ===
On April 15, 1960, she married actor Dean Stockwell. They divorced on July 30, 1962. In December 1964 (reportedly on Christmas day), Perkins married writer and director Robert Thom, who wrote the script for the popular 1968 movie Wild in the Streets, in which she appeared. They had two children: Lillie Thom and Hedy Thom. Perkins and Thom had been separated for some time when Thom died in 1979.

== Filmography ==
=== Films ===
- The Diary of Anne Frank (1959) - Anne Frank
- Wild in the Country (1961) - Betty Lee Parsons
- Dulcinea (1962) - Aldonza / Dulcinea del Toboso
- Ensign Pulver (1964) - Scotty
- The Shooting (1966) - Woman
- Ride in the Whirlwind (1966) - Abigail
- Wild in the Streets (1968) - Mary Fergus
- Cockfighter (1974) - Frances Mansfield
- Lady Cocoa (1975) - Marie
- Alias Big Cherry (1975)
- The Witch Who Came from the Sea (1976) - Molly
- A Gun in the House (1981, TV movie) - Lena Webber
- MacBeth (1981, video) - Lady Macduff
- The Trouble with Grandpa (1981, TV short)
- Love in the Present Tense (1982, TV movie)
- Table for Five (1983) - Kathleen
- The Haunting Passions (1983, TV movie)
- License to Kill (1984, TV movie) - Mary Fiske
- Anatomy of an Illness (1984, TV movie) - Ellen Cousins
- Shattered Vows (1984, TV movie) - Mrs. Gilligan
- The Other Lover (1985, TV movie) - Kate
- At Close Range (1986) - Julie
- Jake Speed (1986) - Mrs. Winston
- Penalty Phase (1986, TV movie) - Nancy Faulkner
- Slam Dance (1987) - Bobby Nye
- Strange Voices (1987, TV movie) - Helen
- Wall Street (1987) - Mrs. Fox
- Broken Angel (1988, TV movie) - Penny Bartman
- Two Moon Junction (1988) - Mrs. Delongpre
- Call Me Anna (1990, TV movie) - Frances Duke
- The Pistol: The Birth of a Legend (1991) - Helen Maravich
- Necronomicon (1993) - Lena (part 2)
- Murder of Innocence (1993, TV movie) - Edna Webber
- Midnight Run for Your Life (1994, TV movie) - Aunt Mimi
- Bodily Harm (1995) - Dr. Spencer
- Harvest of Fire (1996, TV movie) - Ruth
- The Chamber (1996) - Ruth Kramer
- The Summer of Ben Tyler (1996, TV movie) - Doris
- A Woman's a Helluva Thing (2001, TV movie) - Annie
- The Lost City (2005) - Doña Cecilia Fellove
- Yesterday's Dream (2005) - Mrs. Hollister
- Though None Go with Me (2006, TV movie) - Frances Childs

=== Television ===
This, unlike the complete film listing above, includes only series in which Perkins had a recurring role.

- Knots Landing (1983-84; 1990) - Jane Sumner
- A.D. (1985, TV miniseries) - Mary
- Elvis (1990, TV miniseries) - Gladys Presley
- Any Day Now (1998-2002) - Irene O'Brien Otis
- The Young and the Restless (2006) - Rebecca Kaplan
