= Dead Man =

1995 film by Jim Jarmusch

- Theatrical release poster
- Directed by: Jim Jarmusch
- Written by: Jim Jarmusch
- Produced by: Demetra J. MacBride
- Starring: Johnny Depp; Gary Farmer; Lance Henriksen; Michael Wincott; Eugene Byrd; Mili Avital; Crispin Glover; Iggy Pop; Billy Bob Thornton; Jared Harris; Gabriel Byrne; John Hurt; Alfred Molina; Robert Mitchum
- Cinematography: Robby Müller
- Edited by: Jay Rabinowitz
- Music by: Neil Young
- Production company: 12 Gauge Productions; Newmarket Films; Pandora Film; JVC Entertainment
- Distributed by: Miramax Films (U.S.); Pandora Film (Germany); Bowjapan (Japan)
- Release dates: May 26, 1995 (Cannes); December 23, 1995 (Japan); January 4, 1996 (Germany); May 10, 1996 (U.S.)
- Running time: 120 minutes
- Country: United States; Germany; Japan
- Languages: English; Cree; Blackfoot
- Budget: $9 million
- Box office: $1 million

Dead Man is a 1995 acid Western film written and directed by Jim Jarmusch. It stars Johnny Depp, Gary Farmer, Billy Bob Thornton, Iggy Pop, Crispin Glover, John Hurt, Michael Wincott, Lance Henriksen, Gabriel Byrne, Mili Avital, and Robert Mitchum in one of his final film performances. Set in the late 19th century, the story follows William Blake (Depp), a meek accountant on the run after killing a man. He has a chance encounter with enigmatic Native American spirit-guide "Nobody" (Farmer), who believes Blake is the reincarnation of the visionary English poet William Blake.

Described by Jarmusch as a "Psychedelic western", the film is shot entirely in monochrome. Neil Young composed the guitar-dominated soundtrack with portions he improvised while watching the movie footage.

Dead Man premiered at the 1995 Cannes Film Festival, where it competed for the Palme d'Or. Initial critical response was mixed, but retrospective reviews have been generally positive, with Jonathan Rosenbaum describing it as "as exciting and as important as any new American movie I've seen in the 90s." At the 12th Independent Spirit Awards, the film was nominated in four categories, including Best Film.

== Plot ==
William Blake, an accountant from Cleveland, Ohio, rides by train to the frontier company town of Machine to take up a promised accounting job in the town's metal works. During the trip, the train fireman warns Blake against the enterprise. Arriving in town, Blake notes the hostility of the townsfolk towards him. He then discovers that the position has already been filled, and John Dickinson, the ferocious owner of the company, drives Blake from the workplace at gunpoint.

Jobless and without money or prospects, Blake meets Thel Russell, a former prostitute who sells paper flowers. He lets her take him home. Thel's ex-boyfriend Charlie surprises them in bed, shoots at Blake, and accidentally kills Thel when she shields Blake with her body. The bullet passes through Thel and wounds Blake, who kills Charlie with Thel's gun before climbing out the window and fleeing the town on Charlie's horse. Company owner Dickinson is Charlie's father and hires three killers — Cole Wilson, Conway Twill, and Johnny "The Kid" Pickett — to bring Blake back "dead or alive".

Blake awakens to find a large Native American man trying to dislodge the bullet from his chest. The man, calling himself Nobody, reveals that the bullet is too close to Blake's heart to remove, rendering Blake effectively a walking dead man. When he learns Blake's full name, Nobody decides Blake is a reincarnation of William Blake, the eighteenth- and nineteenth-century English poet, whom he idolizes, but of whom Blake is admittedly ignorant. He decides to care for Blake and to use Native methods to help ease him into death.

Blake learns of Nobody's past, marked by prejudice from Euro-Americans who objected to his Indigenous ancestry, and equally from Native Americans who objected that his mother and father were from two opposing tribes, Piikáni and Apsáalooke, respectively. As a child, English soldiers abducted and brought him to Europe as a model savage. He was briefly educated before returning home, where his stories of the white man and his culture were laughed off by fellow Native Americans. They thus dub him Xebeche: "He who talks loud, saying nothing". Nobody resolves to escort Blake to the Pacific Ocean to return him to his proper place in the spirit world.

Blake and Nobody travel west, leaving a trail of dead and encountering wanted posters announcing growing bounties for Blake's death or capture. Nobody leaves Blake alone in the wild when he decides Blake must undergo a vision quest. On his quest, Blake kills two U.S. Marshals, experiences visions of nature spirits, and grieves over the remains of a dead fawn his pursuers accidentally kill. He paints his face with the fawn's blood and rejoins Nobody. Meanwhile, the most ferocious member of the bounty hunter posse, Cole Wilson, has killed his comrades (eating one of them) and continued his hunt alone.

At a trading post, a bigoted missionary identifies Blake and attempts to kill him but instead dies at Blake's hands. Shortly after, Blake is shot again, and his condition rapidly deteriorates. Nobody hurries to take him by the river to a Makah village and persuades the tribe to give him a canoe for Blake's ship burial. Delirious, Blake trudges through the village, where the people pity him, before he collapses from his injuries.

He awakens in a canoe on a beach wearing a Native American funeral dress. Nobody bids Blake farewell and then pushes the canoe out to sea. As he floats away, Blake sees Cole approaching Nobody. Too weak to cry out, he can only watch as the two shoot and kill each other. Looking up at the sky one last time, Blake dies as his canoe drifts out to sea.

== Cast ==
- Johnny Depp as William Blake, a meek accountant from Cleveland, Ohio
- Gary Farmer as Nobody, a strong and opinionated Native American forcibly raised by whites and later given the mocking name Xebeche, or 'He Who Talks Loud, Saying Nothing', by fellow natives
- Crispin Glover as Train Fireman, a coal-covered boilerman who welcomes Blake to the "hell" of Machine
- Lance Henriksen as Cole Wilson, an infamous bounty hunter and murderous cannibal
- Michael Wincott as Conway Twill, a talkative bounty hunter
- Eugene Byrd as Johnny "The Kid" Pickett, a young bounty hunter
- John Hurt as John Scholfield, the business manager of Dickinson's factory
- Robert Mitchum as John Dickinson, a shotgun-toting industrialist in Machine
- Iggy Pop as Salvatore "Sally" Jenko, a cross-dressing, Bible-reading fur trader at a campsite
- Gabriel Byrne as Charlie Dickinson, Thel's ex-boyfriend and John Dickinson's son
- Jared Harris as Benmont Tench, a knife-toting fur trader at Sally's campsite
- Mili Avital as Thel Russell, a former prostitute who makes and sells paper flowers
- Billy Bob Thornton as Big George Drakoulias, a mountain man at Sally's campsite
- Michelle Thrush as Nobody's girlfriend
- Gibby Haynes as Man with gun in alley
- Alfred Molina as the trading post missionary, a corrupt missionary and businessman

== Production ==
Rudy Wurlitzer's unproduced screenplay Zebulon inspired Jarmusch's film. Wurlitzer later rewrote the screenplay as the novel The Drop Edge of Yonder (2008).

Filming took place at various locations in Washington, Oregon, Arizona, and California.

== Soundtrack ==
Neil Young recorded the soundtrack by improvising (mostly on his electric guitar, with some acoustic guitar, piano and organ) as he watched the newly edited film alone on vhs in a recording studio. Jarmusch encouraged Young's improvisational music, as it would add to the film's spontaneous narrative. The soundtrack album consists of seven instrumental tracks by Young, with dialog excerpts from the film and Johnny Depp reading the poetry of William Blake interspersed between the music.

== Themes and analysis ==
=== Cultural allusions ===
The film contains many references to William Blake's poetry. Xebeche, aka Nobody, recites from several Blake poems, including Auguries of Innocence, The Marriage of Heaven and Hell, and The Everlasting Gospel. When bounty hunter Cole warns his companions against drinking from standing water, it references the Proverb of Hell (from the aforementioned Marriage), "Expect poison from standing water". Thel's name is also a reference to Blake's The Book of Thel.

The scenes with Thel culminating in the bedroom murder scene visually enact Blake's poem, "The Sick Rose": "O rose, thou art sick. / The invisible worm, / That flies in the night / In the howling storm: / Has found out thy bed / Of crimson joy: / And his dark secret love / Does thy life destroy." The film's soundtrack album and promotional music video also features Depp reciting passages from Blake's poetry to music Neil Young composed for the film.

Although the film is set in the 19th century, Jarmusch included a number of references to 20th century American culture. Benmont Tench, the man at the campsite played by Jared Harris, is named after Benmont Tench, keyboardist for Tom Petty and the Heartbreakers. Billy Bob Thornton's character, Big George Drakoulias, is named for record producer George Drakoulias. The name of Mitchum's character is a reference to rock producer Jim Dickinson.

The marshals chasing Blake are named Lee Hazlewood and Marvin Throne-berry, after Lee Hazlewood and Marv Throneberry, and also an allusion to the American actor Lee Marvin. Nobody's name ("He Who Talks Loud, Saying Nothing") is a reference to the James Brown song "Talkin' Loud and Sayin' Nothing". Michael Wincott's character is shown in possession of a teddy bear. Also, when asked his name, Xebeche answers, "My name is Nobody." My Name Is Nobody was an Italian Western film from 1973 starring Henry Fonda and Terence Hill, and the clever answer of Ulysses to Polyphemus when asked the same question.

=== Portrayal of Native Americans ===
According to film critic Jonathan Rosenbaum, Dead Man is generally regarded as well-researched in regard to Native American culture. The film is also described as one of few about Native Americans to be directed by a non-native that offers a nuanced understanding of the individual differences between Native American tribes with considerable detail given that is relatively free of common stereotypes. Regarding the character Nobody, Jarmusch stated: "I wanted to make an Indian character who wasn't either a) the savage that must be eliminated, the force of nature that's blocking the way for industrial progress, or b) the noble innocent that knows all and is another cliché. I wanted him to be a complicated human being."

The film intentionally leaves conversations in the Cree and Blackfoot languages untranslated and without subtitles, for the exclusive understanding of members of those nations, including several in-jokes aimed at Native American viewers. Nobody was also played by a First Nations actor, Gary Farmer, who is Cayuga.

== Release ==
The film was entered into the 1995 Cannes Film Festival. It received a limited theatrical release in the United States by Miramax Films on May 10, 1996.

== Reception ==
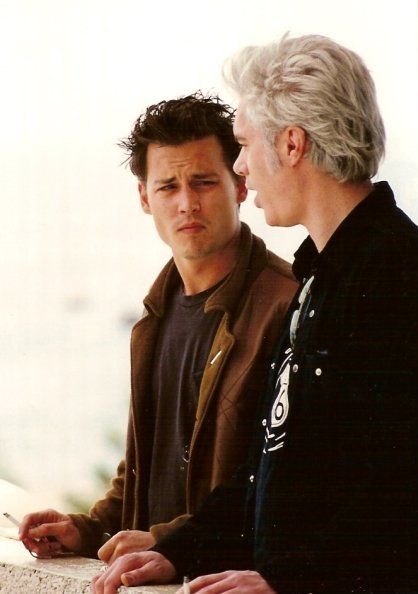
Johnny Depp and Jim Jarmusch at the 1995 Cannes Film Festival

=== Box office ===
In its theatrical release, Dead Man earned $1,037,847 on a budget of $9 million. Then, it was the most expensive of Jarmusch's films, due in part to the costs of ensuring accurate period detail.

=== Critical response ===
Critical responses were mixed. Roger Ebert gave the film one and a half stars out of four, praising the cinematography and Farmer's performance, but otherwise stating the film was "strange, slow [and] unrewarding", and adding: "Jim Jarmusch is trying to get at something here, and I don't have a clue what it is". Desson Howe and Rita Kempley, both writing for The Washington Post, offered largely negative reviews. Greil Marcus, however, mounted a spirited defense of the film, titling his review "Dead Again: Here are 10 reasons why 'Dead Man' is the best movie of the end of the 20th century."

Film critic Jonathan Rosenbaum dubbed the film an acid western, calling it "as exciting and as important as any new American movie I've seen in the 90s" and went on to write a book on the film, Dead Man (ISBN 0-85170-806-4) published by the British Film Institute. The film has a 70% approval rating on website Rotten Tomatoes based on 53 reviews, with an average rating of 7.1/10. The site's consensus reads: "While decidedly not for all tastes, Dead Man marks an alluring change of pace for writer-director Jim Jarmusch that demonstrates an assured command of challenging material". Metacritic reports a score of 62 out of 100 from 20 critics, indicating "generally favorable" reviews.

In July 2010, The New York Times chief film critic A. O. Scott capped a laudatory "Critics' Picks" video review of the film by calling it "One of the very best movies of the 1990s."

The Criterion Collection added the film to their collection, due to its "profound and unique revision of the western genre".

=== Awards and nominations ===
Institution	Year	Category	Nominee	Result
American Indian Film Festival	1997	Best Actor	Gary Farmer	Won
Cahiers du Cinéma	1996	Annual Top 10 Lists	Jim Jarmusch	6th place
Cannes Film Festival	1995	Palme d'Or	Jim Jarmusch	Nominated
Chicago Film Critics Association Awards	1997	Best Film	Dead Man	Nominated
Chicago Film Critics Association Awards	1997	Best Cinematography	Robby Müller	Nominated
Chicago Film Critics Association Awards	1997	Best Original Score	Neil Young	Nominated
European Film Awards	1996	Best Non-European Film	Jim Jarmusch	Won
Film Independent Spirit Awards	1997	Best Film	Demetra J. MacBride	Nominated
Film Independent Spirit Awards	1997	Best Screenplay	Jim Jarmusch	Nominated
Film Independent Spirit Awards	1997	Best Supporting Male	Gary Farmer	Nominated
Film Independent Spirit Awards	1997	Best Cinematography	Robby Müller	Nominated
First Americans in the Arts	1997	Outstanding Performance by an Actor in a Film (Lead)	Gary Farmer	Won
National Society of Film Critics	1997	Best Picture	Dead Man	Nominated
National Society of Film Critics	1997	Best Director	Jim Jarmusch	Nominated
National Society of Film Critics	1997	Best Cinematography	Robby Müller	Won (Note: Shared with Breaking the Waves.)
New York Film Critics Circle	1996	Best Cinematographer	Robby Müller	Won (Note: Shared with Breaking the Waves.)

== In other media ==
Gary Farmer makes a cameo appearance as Nobody in Jarmusch's subsequent film Ghost Dog: The Way of the Samurai, in which he repeats one of his signature lines of dialogue, "Stupid fucking white man!"

Johnny Depp makes a brief cameo as William Blake in Mika Kaurismäki's film L.A. Without a Map.

== See also ==
- List of post-1960s films in black-and-white
- Revisionist Western – Western film subgenre
