= Road to Nowhere (film) =

2010 film by Monte Hellman

- Theatrical release poster
- Directed by: Monte Hellman
- Written by: Steven Gaydos
- Produced by: Monte Hellman; Steven Gaydos; Melissa Hellman
- Starring: Cliff De Young; Waylon Payne; Tygh Runyan; Shannyn Sossamon; Dominique Swain
- Cinematography: Josep M. Civit
- Edited by: Céline Ameslon
- Music by: Tom Russell
- Production company: Entertainment One
- Distributed by: Monterey Media
- Release dates: September 10, 2010 (VIF); June 10, 2011 (New York)
- Running time: 121 minutes
- Country: United States
- Language: English
- Budget: $5 million
- Box office: $161,619

Road to Nowhere is a 2010 American romance thriller film directed by Monte Hellman, written by Steven Gaydos, and starring Cliff De Young, Waylon Payne, Shannyn Sossamon, Tygh Runyan, and Dominique Swain. It was Hellman's first feature film in 21 years, as well as his final feature film before his death in April 2021.

Road to Nowhere was shot in western North Carolina from July to August 2009, before moving to Europe. The film premiered on September 10, 2010, at the 67th Venice International Film Festival and was nominated for the Golden Lion, but won Jury Award Special Lion for Career Achievement. The film was given a limited release in New York on June 10, 2011, and in Los Angeles on June 17, 2011.

== Premise ==
A promising young filmmaker named Mitchell Haven invites Laurel Graham, an unknown actress, to play Velma Duran, a person involved in a financial scandal that made headlines, in his new film. The director falls in love with his muse, and the sordid criminal affair on which the film is based resurfaces.

== Cast ==
- Shannyn Sossamon as Laurel Graham / Velma Duran
- Dominique Swain as Nathalie Post
- Cliff De Young as Cary Stewart / Rafe Taschen
- Tygh Runyan as Mitchell Haven
- Fabio Testi as Nestor Duran
- John Diehl as Bobby Billings
- Waylon Payne as Bruno Brotherton
- Rob Kolar as Steve Gates
- Bonnie Pointer as herself
- Michael Bigham as Joe Watts
- Lathan McKay as Erik
- Nic Paul as Jeremy Laidlaw
- Peter Bart as himself

== Production ==
=== Development ===
Road to Nowhere was Monte Hellman's first feature film in 21 years. The film was written by Variety executive editor Steven Gaydos. Shannyn Sossamon was the first actor to be cast after Gaydos saw her in a restaurant rehearsing a scene with another person. Reluctantly, Gaydos gave Sossamon his card saying, "I don't do this often, but I wonder if you or your agent would contact Monte Hellman." Hellman told the Los Angeles Times that he dedicated the film to Laurie Bird, with whom Hellman fell in love while directing her in Two-Lane Blacktop.

=== Filming ===
On a budget of under $5 million, principal photography took place almost entirely on location in western North Carolina between July and August 2009. Hellman shot with a Canon EOS 5D Mark II, which recorded 12 minutes at a time on a flash card (as opposed to 10 minutes with a 35mm film). Scenes were shot at the Balsam Mountain Inn in Balsam for four to five weeks. Several other scenes were shot in the Boyd Mountain Log Cabins in Waynesville. Still other scenes were shot at Doc Holliday's bar in Maggie Valley, at the Fontana Dam, and at the Jackson County Airport. Students from University of North Carolina School of the Arts and Western Carolina University were hired as production assistants and also served as extras. Other shooting locations were done in Los Angeles.

Jim Rowell, a Cullowhee resident got a deal with the filmmakers that allowed him to make a fuel pump repair at the airport in exchange for flying his 1966 Piper Cherokee four-passenger plane as a stuntman. Rowell did eight to nine passes over the lake, flying 300 to 500 feet above the water. In post-production, film editors cut the shots back and forth of Rowell flying near the dam and the actual actor sitting in Rowell's plane pretending to fly in front of a green screen and crashing the plane into the Fontana Dam. Natasha Senjanovic of The Hollywood Reporter called the plane crash one of "cinema's top plane crashes" and remarked that, "[it] is beautifully shot and comes as a total surprise".

Hellman still needed to shoot some scenes in Europe, but was over budget. His daughter, co-producer Melissa Hellman, raised more money through private equity. Hellman shot in the streets of London and traveled to Italy to shoot at Lake Garda. Other scenes were shot in the church of San Pietro in Vincoli, and in front of Michelangelo's Moses and the tomb of Pope Julius II in Rome.

== Release ==
In January 2011, Monterey Media bought the United States distribution rights from Entertainment One. The American Cinematheque at the Egyptian hosted a tribute to Hellman which culminated on May 14, 2011, with a special premiere screening of Road to Nowhere. On June 8, 2011, the Film Society of Lincoln Center hosted an evening with Hellman, which included a special presentation of Road to Nowhere and a screening of Hellman's adaptation of Cockfighter.

=== Festivals ===
Road to Nowhere was selected to screen at the following film festivals:

- 2010 Whistler Film Festival
- 2010 Venice Film Festival
- 2010 Palm Springs International Film Festival
- 2010 South by Southwest
- 2011 Nashville Film Festival
- 2011 Karlovy Vary International Film Festival
- 2011 Filmfest Oldenburg

=== Limited theatrical run ===
Road to Nowhere was given a limited release in New York City on June 10, 2011, and in Los Angeles on June 17, 2011. In New York the film opened in one theater and grossed $2,521 for its opening weekend. It grossed a total of $4,984 in its first week. In Los Angeles the film opened in six theaters and grossed $6,051—$864 per theater for its opening weekend, a 140% increase in tickets. In its third week it grossed $3,936—$984 per theater, a 35% decrease in ticket sales from the previous week. It was removed from three theaters. In its fourth weekend, a four-day weekend, the film made $3,113—$778 per theater. By its fifth weekend it was removed from two theaters and had a 67% percent drop in tickets making $846–$423 per theater. By its sixth weekend the film was playing in three theaters making $877–$292 per theater. For its seventh weekend, it gained $3,609—$722 per theater in five theaters, an increase of 247.4% from the previous weekend.

The film grossed $83,496 in France and $37,829 in Portugal. Road to Nowhere earned $40,294 in theatrical release in the United States and $121,325 in other markets, for a worldwide total of $161,619.

=== Home media ===
Road to Nowhere was released to DVD and Blu-ray on August 23, 2011. Features include a 15-min behind the scenes (making of the film) video and a 14-min Q&A with Hellman and Gaydos at the Nashville Film Festival.

== Critical reception ==
On the review aggregator website Rotten Tomatoes, 76% of 25 critics' reviews are positive, with an average rating of 6.6/10. Metacritic, which uses a weighted average, assigned the film a score of 59 out of 100, based on 17 critics, indicating "mixed or average" reviews.

Kevin Thomas of the Los Angeles Times wrote, "In its masterful use of evocative imagery and music, Road to Nowhere is flawless". After an interview with Hellman, John Anderson from The New York Times said, "Road may also be as significant to the indie feature as Avatar is to the popcorn movie". Road to Nowhere was also included in Roger Corman's Legendary Films Blog.

Nick Dawson wrote a positive review after it screened at South by Southwest Film Festival. Roger Ebert gave the film two out of four stars criticizing the story's film within a film narrative. He said, "Road to Nowhere is not a failure in that it sets out to do exactly what it does, and does it. The question remains of why it should have been done. Hellman's skill is evident everywhere in precise framing and deliberate editing. Each scene works within itself on its own terms. But there is no whole here. I've rarely seen a narrative film that seemed so reluctant to flow. Nor perhaps one with a more accurate title".

== Awards ==
Festival	Category	Winner/Nominee	Won
Venice International Film Festival	Jury Award Special Lion for Career Achievement	Monte Hellman	Yes
Palm Springs International Film Festival	Maverick Award	Monte Hellman	Yes
Whistler Film Festival	Special Tribute for Lifetime Achievements	Monte Hellman	Yes
Nashville Film Festival	Coleman Sinking Creek Award	Monte Hellman	Yes
