= The Shooting =

1966 film by Monte Hellman

- US film poster
- Directed by: Monte Hellman
- Written by: Carole Eastman; (credited as Adrien Joyce)
- Produced by: Jack Nicholson; Monte Hellman
- Starring: Jack Nicholson; Millie Perkins; Will Hutchins; Warren Oates
- Cinematography: Gregory Sandor
- Edited by: Monte Hellman
- Music by: Richard Markowitz
- Production companies: Proteus Films; Santa Clara Productions
- Distributed by: Jack H. Harris Enterprises; Favorite Films
- Release dates: October 23, 1966 (SFIFF); February 24, 1971 (Dallas)
- Running time: 82 minutes
- Country: United States
- Language: English
- Budget: $75,000

The Shooting is a 1966 American Western film edited and directed by Monte Hellman, with a screenplay by Carole Eastman (using the pseudonym Adrien Joyce). It stars Warren Oates, Millie Perkins, Will Hutchins, and Jack Nicholson, and was produced by Nicholson and Hellman. The story is about two men who are hired by a mysterious woman to accompany her to a town located many miles across the desert. During their journey, they are closely tracked by a black-clad gunslinger, who seems intent on killing all of them.

The film was shot in 1965 in the Utah desert, back-to-back with Hellman's similar Western Ride in the Whirlwind, which also starred Nicholson and Perkins. Both films were shown at several international film festivals, but the U.S. distribution rights were not purchased until 1968, by the Walter Reade Organization. No other domestic distributor had expressed any interest in the films. Walter Reade decided to bypass a theatrical release, and the two titles were sold directly to television.

== Plot ==
Willet Gashade, a former bounty hunter, returns to his small mining camp after a lengthy absence and finds his slow-witted friend Coley in a state of fear. Coley explains to Gashade that their partner, Leland Drum, had been shot to death two days before by an unseen assassin. The killing was possibly committed in revenge for the accidental trampling death of "a little person" in town, which may have been caused by Gashade's brother, Coigne. Coigne had inexplicably rushed away from their camp moments before the shooting death. Coley becomes increasingly paranoid and Gashade takes his friend's gun away from him.

The following day, a young woman shoots her horse to death immediately outside of the camp. The sound of the gunshot temporarily sends the frightened Coley into hiding. Gashade examines the dead horse and notes that it appeared to be perfectly healthy, though the woman had said its leg was broken. The woman offers Gashade a thousand dollars to lead her to a place called Kingsley. Although openly distrustful of her, he grudgingly accepts the offer. Coley, apparently smitten by the woman, accompanies them.

The young woman is rude and insulting to both Gashade and Coley. She refuses to tell them her name. The three stop briefly in Crosstree. Gashade learns that Coigne was seen there only a day or two before. As they continue traveling slowly through the hot desert, Gashade observes that they are being followed by a stranger dressed in black. He is Billy Spear, who continues to keep his distance from them. Gashade sees that the woman appears to be signaling to the man. Coley makes attempts to talk to the woman, but she continually taunts and insults him. She also repeatedly refuses to answer any of Gashade's questions regarding the purpose of their journey.

At night, having mistaken random gunshots by Coley as a signal from the woman, Spear suddenly walks into their camp and joins them. Hired by the woman as a gunslinger for reasons unknown, Spear is suspicious and hostile toward Gashade and contemptuous of Coley. He repeatedly threatens both of their lives. Gashade advises Coley to keep away from Spear.

The woman rides her horse hard. When it dies of exhaustion, Coley gives his horse to the woman and Gashade allows Coley to ride with him. Later, the woman loses the trail and asks Gashade to lead on. Gashade's horse shows signs of fatigue, so Gashade tells Coley to join the woman on her horse, but Spear forbids him from doing so. The woman says that the journey would be much easier without Coley. Spear and she demand that he be left behind. Gashade, under threat by Spear, reluctantly agrees and tells Coley he will come back for him soon. As they ride away, Spear brags to Coley that he was the one who killed Leland, and threatens to shoot Coley if he tries to follow and tell Gashade.

The three see a bearded man sitting in the middle of the desert nursing a broken leg. The man tells the woman that the person she is seeking is only one day's ride away. She leaves him a canteen of water. Meanwhile, the bearded man's lost horse is found by Coley. He mounts the horse and rides back to the group. He charges at Spear, who shoots him dead. Gashade buries his friend in the sand.

One of the horses dies, and another is weak. The group runs low on water, but they still keep moving. Gashade sees Spear growing weaker, and when the moment is right, attacks him. They fight, and after knocking Spear unconscious, Gashade grabs a large rock and crushes the killer's gun hand. Gashade walks after the woman, who is now closely following a man up the side of a rock formation. The man turns around and Gashade sees that the man is his look-alike brother, Coigne. Gashade attempts to tackle the woman as she pulls out a gun and takes aim at Coigne, but it is too late: the woman shoots Coigne dead. Gashade, lying next to the now still woman, says "Coigne". Spear stumbles aimlessly under the hot sun.

== Cast ==
- Warren Oates as Willett Gashade: By the time Warren Oates starred in The Shooting, he had become a veteran Western character actor, having appeared in dozens of film and television series in the genre since 1957. When director Hellman first suggested Oates as the star of the film, co-star and co-producer Nicholson immediately agreed with the choice, but during the filming, Nicholson and Oates repeatedly clashed, with the two frequently ending up in screaming matches. According to Hellman, production had to shut down for half a day when Oates refused to speak a lengthy amount of dialogue in the way Hellman wanted, preferring instead to whisper the lines almost unintelligibly. Oates stormed away from the film crew in anger when the director insisted. After Oates finally returned late in the afternoon, Hellman allowed the actor to read the lines the way he wanted, as long as he also read them in Hellman's preferred manner. In the editing room, Hellman rejected Oates's version.
- Will Hutchins as Coley: As Gashade's dimwitted friend, Hutchins was cast in the same burst of inspiration that Hellman had when he also thought of Warren Oates and Millie Perkins for the other lead roles in the film. Like Oates, when The Shooting began production, Hutchins was already fully identified with the Western genre, having starred for several years in the ABC-TV television series Sugarfoot, which ran from 1957 to 1961. Both Perkins and Hellman later recalled the actor as being a funny and charming man, who never complained about the often adverse filming conditions.
- Millie Perkins as the Woman: Best known for playing the title role in The Diary of Anne Frank, Perkins was Hellman's next-door neighbor when she was cast as the enigmatic, unnamed woman who leads the search party to their doom. The Shooting was her fifth film, immediately followed by another starring role in Hellman's companion Western, Ride in the Whirlwind. Although Perkins enjoyed working on both of Hellman's Westerns, and became good friends with Warren Oates, she was dismayed that Hellman insisted on such realism that he allowed only the most minimal of makeup to be applied to the actors. She felt she was constantly filmed in an unflattering manner.
- Jack Nicholson as Billy Spear: This was the young actor's 13th film appearance, and his fourth with director Hellman. In addition to playing the odious villain, Nicholson had been asked by Hellman to co-produce the film. The director called that decision "the biggest mistake of my life." Nicholson was constantly worried about the budget and repeatedly argued with Hellman over minuscule budgetary concerns.
- B.J. Merholz as Leland Drum
- Charles Eastman as Bearded Man
- Guy El Tsosie as Indian at Cross Tree
- Brandon Carroll as Sheriff
- Wally Moon as Deputy
- William Mackleprang as Cross Tree Townsman
- James Campbell as Cross Tree Townsman

== Production ==
In 1964, Monte Hellman and Jack Nicholson had made two films together, Back Door to Hell and Flight to Fury, which were produced by Fred Roos and filmed back-to-back in the Philippines. After completing the films, the director and actor wrote a screenplay called Epitaph and presented it to Roger Corman to produce. Corman did not care for the script, but asked if the two would be willing to do a Western for him, instead. When they expressed an interest, Corman further suggested that they film two Westerns, in a manner similar to the Philippine-shot movies they had just finished. They agreed, and while Nicholson started working on the script for Ride in the Whirlwind, Hellman asked their mutual friend Carole Eastman to write The Shooting.

According to Hellman, Eastman's script was used almost exactly as written, with no need for any rewrites. Hellman felt, though, that the first part of the script had too much expository material involving Gashade's trip through the desert as he returned to the mining camp, so Hellman simply deleted it, noting that "Exposition, by its very nature, is artificial." After discarding the material, Hellman began shooting around "page 10" of the screenplay. He felt the story was "perfectly simple" and did not need any additional information to help the audience figure things out. Nonetheless, Corman insisted on Hellman inserting a certain amount of exposition that Corman hoped would help explain the story. Corman felt that if mention was made three times during the course of the film that Gashade had a brother, audiences would not be confused by the climactic sequence. Hellman reluctantly agreed.

After briefly considering Sterling Hayden for Gashade, Hellman was shopping in a Los Angeles bookstore when he suddenly and simultaneously thought of Perkins, Warren Oates, and Will Hutchins for the main roles. Perkins was Hellman's next-door neighbor at the time, and she had known both Hellman and Nicholson for many years, having first met them while all of them were attending the same acting class. Hellman immediately telephoned Nicholson with his casting idea. Nicholson agreed that the three actors would be perfect.

Hellman and Nicholson scouted locations for several weeks, and looked at such familiar locales as Monument Valley before deciding on Kanab, Utah. They chose that area because it offered them both the "box canyon" needed for Whirlwind and the "desolate desert" for The Shooting. Parts of the film were shot at Kanab Canyon, Calvin Johnson Ranch, and Glen Canyon in Utah.

Corman financed the picture, serving as the film's uncredited executive producer. The budget was $75,000. Shooting began on April 15, 1965, with a production crew consisting of only seven individuals. During the first two days of the production, actual shooting was extremely limited due to near-constant rain, which caused severe flooding in the areas where they had planned to shoot. Hellman estimated that $5,000 of the already small budget was eaten up by the wasted time. Another $10,000 of the budget were for the horse wranglers' salaries, the only union element of the film, apart from the actors. Corman's deal with Hellman and Nicholson was that if the film went over budget, any additional costs would come out of their own pockets. Despite the initial problems, the film was completed for the original budget estimate.

Because of the restrictively low budget, no lighting equipment was used during the shoot. Gregory Sandor shot the entire film in existing light (XL). For the film's many tracking shots, Hellman estimated the crew had only been able to bring along about eight feet of dolly tracks.

After The Shooting was completed, production immediately commenced on Hellman's Ride in the Whirlwind, a similarly mysterious Western that also featured Nicholson and Perkins in the cast. Both films were completed in a total of six weeks of continuous shooting (three weeks per film).

Hellman reportedly spent over a year editing the films, a claim Hellman vigorously denies. In 1967, both films received excellent reviews at the Montreal World Film Festival, and were shown out-of-competition at the Cannes Film Festival.

== Release ==
No U.S. distributor expressed any interest in either film. Nicholson sold the foreign rights to a French film producer, but the producer went bankrupt, and the prints of both films remained in bond at the Paris airport for almost two years. After "considerable legal maneuvering", Hellman and Nicholson were able to get the rights reverted to them. In 1968, Hellman managed to get both films theatrical showings in Paris, albeit without a distributor. According to Hellman, The Shooting was a sizeable arthouse hit and played for over a year in Paris. Also in 1968, the U.S. rights for both were sold to the Walter Reade Organization, a New York-based theatre chain that occasionally distributed films (they also handled the initial release of Night of the Living Dead). They decided to pass on a theatrical release. Instead, both films were sold directly to television. In 1971, theatrical rights to the film were obtained by Jack H. Harris Enterprises Inc., who purchased the rights based "on the strength of Jack Nicholson's new-found fame."

== Reception ==
The Shooting was never released theatrically, had sparse television showings, and therefore initially had a very limited core of fans. Critics who did manage to view the film were extremely enthusiastic, and generally found it superior to Hellman's companion Western, Ride in the Whirlwind. Danny Peary in Cult Movies (1981), after admitting he had difficulties with the "puzzling" climax, noted, "But while the end may ask more questions than it answers, the exciting journey that brings us to this point is one of the most rewarding sequences in the history of Westerns." Leonard Maltin said it was an "...ultimately powerful film with an offbeat performance by Nicholson as a hired gun... and an incredible, unexpected finale."

David Pirie in Time Out wrote:

"Probably the first Western which really deserves to be called existential... Hellman builds remorselessly on the atmosphere and implications of the 'quest' until it assumes a terrifying importance in itself... What Hellman has done is to take the basic tools of the Western, and use them, without in anyway diluting or destroying their power, as the basis for a Kafkaesque drama."

Phil Hardy's The Aurum Film Encyclopedia: The Western notes that "Hellman's calculated style, replete with disorientating close-ups and strange moments... confirm the detached fatalism of his story. This is a marvelous film." James Monaco's The Movie Guide described the film as "[H]ighly effective, playing with various levels of character and ideas... it is a fine western stylization that should not be missed." Jonathan Rosenbaum has referred to the film as the first acid Western, and cited it as an inspiration for Jim Jarmusch's Dead Man. He would later write that "Brad Stevens' excellent Monte Hellman: His Life and Films links this odd movie, which he calls Hellman’s first masterpiece, to Samuel Beckett's Waiting for Godot, but I'm more prone to view it as the best western Alain Resnais never made...If it weren’t so funny in its inimitable absurdist way, I suppose one could call it pretentious, but only at the risk of missing all the scary fun."

On the review aggregator website Rotten Tomatoes, 100% of 18 critics' reviews are positive, with an average rating of 8.0/10.

== See also ==
- List of American films of 1966
- List of cult films
