= Katherine Squire =

American actress

- Katherine Squire in The Virginian 1962
- Born: March 9, 1903; Defiance, Ohio, U.S.
- Died: March 29, 1995 (aged 92); Lake Hill, New York, U.S.
- Education: Ohio Wesleyan University
- Occupation: Actress
- Years active: 1927–1989
- Spouse: George Mitchell (m.1940–1972 his death)

Katherine Squire (March 9, 1903 – March 29, 1995) was an American actress who appeared on Broadway and in regional theater, movies and television, from the 1920s through the 1980s.

== Early life ==
Squire was born in Defiance, Ohio. She attended Ohio Wesleyan University and, after graduation, began acting in regional theater at the Cleveland Play House. Squire later studied acting at the American Laboratory Theater.

== Career ==
Squire made her Broadway stage debut in 1927 in Much Ado About Nothing. She later appeared in Broadway productions of Goodbye Again (1932), Hipper's Holiday, Three Men on a Horse (1937), and Lady of Letters (1935), among other plays.

In 1951, Squire made her television debut in an episode of Pulitzer Prize Playhouse. For the remainder of the decade, she appeared in guest roles on Goodyear Playhouse, Robert Montgomery Presents, Westinghouse Studio One, The United States Steel Hour, and Playhouse 90. In 1954, she portrayed Gertrude Harper in the CBS drama Woman with a Past. From 1956 to 1957, Squire had a recurring role in the soap opera Valiant Lady. She made her feature film debut in the 1959 drama The Story on Page One. Squire also continued acting on the stage with roles in The Traveling Lady, Six Characters in Search of an Author, The Sin of Pat Muldoon, and The Shadow of a Gunman.

During the 1960s, Squire continued her career in films, television and stage roles. In 1960, she made two guest appearances on Alfred Hitchcock Presents, and appeared as the mother of Dirk Bogarde's character in Song Without End. Squire returned to the stage the following year in a co-starring role in the New York production of Roots, by Arnold Wesker. On television, she portrayed the title character's mother in Dr. Kildare. From 1962 to 1963, she guest starred on two episodes of The Twilight Zone: "One More Pallbearer" and "In His Image". She made three guest appearances on Perry Mason: Clara Thorpe in the 1960 episode "The Case of the Credulous Quarry," Vera Hargrave, the murderess, in the 1964 episode "The Case of the Nervous Neighbor," and Esther Norden in the 1965 episode "The Case of the Wrongful Writ." She had additional guest roles on The Road West, Peyton Place, and Adam-12.

In 1971, Squire co-starred in the road film Two-Lane Blacktop. Starting in 1970, she had a recurring role in the long-running soap opera The Doctors. In 1974 and 1975, Squire had her third recurring role on the soap opera Search for Tomorrow. Her last television appearance was in 1975 in the Hallmark Hall of Fame television film Eric, as Mrs. Harris. For the remainder of her career, Squire appeared in roles in regional theater. In 1979, she had a leading role in Hillbilly Women at the Long Wharf Theater in New Haven, Connecticut. In the early 1980s, she acted in Hedda Gabler (starring Susannah York) at the Roundabout Theater, and in Memory of Whiteness at the American Place Theater, both in New York. Squire's final onscreen role was in the romantic comedy film When Harry Met Sally... in 1989.

== Personal life ==
On 19 January 1930, she married actor Byron McGrath, in Cleveland. They subsequently divorced. In 1940, Squire married actor George Mitchell, with whom she often worked on stage, in film, and on television. They remained married until his death in 1972.

== Death ==
Squire died on March 29, 1995, in Lake Hill, New York, at the age of 92.

== Broadway credits ==
Date	Production	Role
November 18 – December 1927	Much Ado About Nothing	Watch
January 11 – March 1932	The Black Tower	Mona
December 28, 1932 – July 1933	Goodbye Again	Julia Wilson
October 18 – October 1934	Hipper's Holiday	Helen Tyson
January 30, 1935 – January 9, 1937	Three Men on a Horse	Audrey Trowbridge (Replacement)
March 28 – April 1935	Lady of Letters	Winifred Shaw
September 20 – September 1935	Life's Too Short	Hannah Priest
October 27, 1937 – March 1938	Many Mansions	Mrs. Roberts
February 5 – February 22, 1941	Liberty Jones	Nurse Cotton
March 30 – April 3, 1943	The Family	Anna Petrovna Chernov
April 5, 1944 – January 6, 1945	Chicken Every Sunday	Mrs. Lynch
October 27 – November 20, 1954	The Traveling Lady	Sitter Mavis
December 11, 1955 – February 5, 1956	Six Characters in Search of an Author	The Mother
March 13 – March 16, 1957	The Sin of Pat Muldoon	Brigid Muldoon
November 20, 1958 – January 3, 1959	The Shadow of a Gunman	Mrs. Grigson

== Filmography ==
Film
Year	Title	Role	Notes
1959	The Story on Page One	Mrs. Hattie Brown	
1960	Song Without End	Anna Liszt	
1960	Studs Lonigan	Mrs. Lonigan	
1962	Day of Wine and Roses	Mrs. Nolan	Uncredited
1965	Ride in the Whirlwind	Catherine	
1971	Two-Lane Blacktop	Old Woman	
1973	Lolly-Madonna XXX	Chickie Feather	
1973	Blade	Aunt Cynthia	
1989	When Harry Met Sally...	Documentary Couple #4	

Television
Year	Title	Role	Notes
1951	Pulitzer Prize Playhouse		Episode: "Icebound"
1951–1956	Robert Montgomery Presents	Various roles	6 episodes
1952	CBS Television Workshop		Episode: "The Rocket"
1952	Mister Peepers	Mrs. Crump	Episode #1.12
1953	The Gulf Playhouse		2 episodes
1953–1956	Goodyear Television Playhouse	Various roles	2 episodes
1954	Justice		Episode: "Death for Sale"
1955–1957	The United States Steel Hour	Various roles	3 episodes
1956	Playwrights '56	Various roles	2 episodes
1956	Westinghouse Studio One	Mrs. Chester	Episode: "An Incident of Love"
1956–1957	Valiant Lady	Gertrude Harper	Unknown episodes
1956–1960	Playhouse 90	Various roles	2 episodes
1957	The Big Story	Mrs. Larabee	Episode: "Widow's Luck"
1957	The Alcoa Hour	Annie	Episode: "Mrs. Gilling and the Skyscraper"
1958	The Veil	Emma Haney	Episode: "Genesis"
1958	Shirley Temple Theatre	Flora	Episode: "The Little Lame Prince"
1958	Mickey Spillane's Mike Hammer	Sarah Nolan	Episode: "That Schoolgirl Complex"
1958	Peter Gunn	Gussie Warnecke	Episode: "The Leaper"
1959	Westinghouse Desilu Playhouse	Mrs. O'Donnell	Episode: "The Innocent Assassin"
1959	The Lawless Years	Mrs. Safranik	Episode: "The Lion and the Mouse"
1959	Tales of Wells Fargo	Louise	Episode: "The Quiet Village"
1959–1960	Markham	Various roles	2 episodes
1960	Johnny Midnight	Ethel	Episode: "Voice of a Dummy"
1960	Play of the Week	Grandma	Episode: "The Closing Door"
1960	The Texan	Mrs. Dawson	Episode: "Thirty Hours to Kill"
1960	Peter Loves Mary	Laura	Episode: "High Society"
1960	Alfred Hitchcock Presents	Carlos' Wife	Season 5 Episode 15: "Man from the South"
1960	Alfred Hitchcock Presents	Miss Lowen	Season 6 Episode 6: "Pen Pal"
1960	The Law and Mr. Jones	Mrs. Rice	Episode: "The Promise of Life"
1960–1965	Perry Mason	Various roles	3 episodes
1961	The Barbara Stanwyck Show	Elvie	Episode: "Dear Charlie"
1961	The Tom Ewell Show	Abbey	Episode: "Storm Over Shangri-La"
1961	The Loretta Young Show	Mrs. Douglas	Episode: "The Preliminaries"
1961	Armstrong Circle Theatre	Mrs. Peterson	Episode: "Briefing from Room 103"
1961	Alcoa Premiere	Nurse Harrington	Episode: "People Need People"
1961	Checkmate	Mrs. Vorlund	Episode: "Through a Dark Glass"
1961	Dr. Kildare	Mrs. Kildare	Episode: "The Lonely"
1961	Bus Stop	Mrs. Wylie	Episode: "Call Back Yesterday"
1961	Thriller	Agatha Moffat	Episode: "Portrait Without a Face"
1962	The Virginian	Sophie McCallum	Episode: "The Devil's Children"; Uncredited
1962–1963	The Twilight Zone	Various roles	2 episodes
1963	The Alfred Hitchcock Hour	Mrs. Fenton	Season 1 Episode 24: "The Star Juror"
1963	The Alfred Hitchcock Hour	Mrs. La Font	Season 2 Episode 3: "Terror at Northfield"
1964	Profiles in Courage	Mrs. Simpson	Episode: "Mary S. McDowell"
1965	The Alfred Hitchcock Hour	Mrs. Adams	Season 3 Episode 19: "Wally the Beard"
1966	The Road West	Grandma	2 episodes
1966	Peyton Place	Mrs. Burroughs	Episode #3.16
1969	Adam-12	Mrs. Hess	Episode: "Log 51: A Jumper, Code 2"
1969	This Savage Land	Grandma Pride	TV movie
1970	The Doctors	Emma Simpson	Unknown episodes
1974	Apple's Way	Mrs. Perry	Episode: "The Teacher"
1974–1975	Search for Tomorrow	Raney Wesner	Unknown episodes
1975	Eric	Mrs. Harris	TV movie
