= George Mitchell (actor) =

American actor (1905–1972)

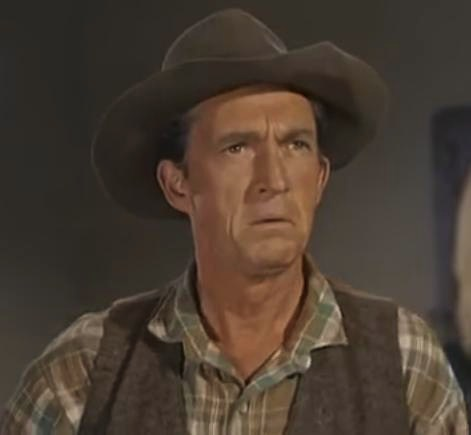
- George Mitchell in TV's Bonanza, episode "The Gunmen" (1960)
- Born: February 21, 1905; Larchmont, New York, U.S.
- Died: January 18, 1972 (aged 66); Washington, D.C., U.S.
- Occupation: Actor
- Years active: 1935–1971
- Spouse: Katherine Squire (m. 1940)

George Mitchell (February 21, 1905 – January 18, 1972) was an American actor who performed from 1935 through 1971 in film, television, and on Broadway.

== Early life ==
Mitchell was born February 21, 1905, in Larchmont in Westchester County in New York. He married his first wife, Mary Alice Shroyer (m.Dec 1927-div.1937) He fathered four children with Mary A. Shroyer. Mary (Mitchell) Oliver(deceased), Judith (Mitchell)Glasel (1930–present), George Mitchell III (deceased), and Eve (Mitchell) Joice(1936–present).He decided to become an actor after marrying actress Katherine Squire.

== Roles of note ==
Mitchell became a bit typecast in Hollywood, usually playing loathsome characters who operated outside of the law. On television, Mitchell's credits include acting in two episodes of Alfred Hitchcock Presents called "Wally the Beard" (original air date March 1, 1965) with co-stars Larry Blyden and Kathie Brown, in which he played a knowledgeable and cranky seller of boats, and "Forty Detectives Later" (airing April 24, 1960), in which he portrayed the client of a private detective (James Franciscus) whom he hires to track the supposed murderer (Jack Weston) of his wife. On Broadway, 1969–70, he portrayed Chief Joseph in the play Indians, the source of Robert Altman's film Buffalo Bill and the Indians, or Sitting Bull's History Lesson.

George Mitchell acted in several films and television episodes with his wife, Katherine Squire, the two of them often playing a husband-and-wife couple intrinsic to the story. One example was the two of them as an elderly couple in the Jack Nicholson film "Ride in the Whirlwind" — they first appear as a refuge for the two men on the run, but who then become instrumental to the fugitives' destruction. Other examples occurred in their roles in episodes of The Alfred Hitchcock Hour.

George Mitchell's major acting credits include the film The Andromeda Strain (1971), directed by Robert Wise, co-starring Arthur Hill, and based on the novel of the same name by Michael Crichton. He played the comic relief as cranky old town drunk who, along with an infant, were among the only survivors of exposure to the deadly Andromeda Strain.

== Broadway career ==
- The Merry Widow, playing Cascada, July 15, 1942 – August 16, 1942
- The New Moon, playing Jacques, August 18, 1942 – September 6, 1942
- The Patriots, playing Ned, January 29, 1943 – June 26, 1943
- Blossom Time, playing Von Schwind, September 4, 1943 – October 9, 1943
- The New Moon, playing Captain Paul Duval, May 17, 1944 – ?
- Goodbye, My Fancy, playing Dr. Pitt, November 17, 1948 – December 24, 1949
- The Day After Tomorrow, playing Dr. Shaw, October 26, 1950 – November 11, 1950
- Desire Under the Elms, playing Peter Cabot, January 16, 1952 – February 23, 1952
- The Crucible, playing John Willard, January 22, 1953 – July 11, 1953
- Indians, playing Chief Joseph, October 13, 1969 – January 3, 1970

== Film career ==
- Once in a Blue Moon (1935) .... Kolla
- Virginia (1941) .... Guest (uncredited)
- Captain Eddie (1945) .... Lieutenant Johnny De Angelis
- The Phenix City Story (1955) .... Hugh Britton
- 3:10 to Yuma (1957) .... Bartender
- The Wild and the Innocent (1959) .... Uncle Lije Hawks
- Third of a Man (1962)
- Birdman of Alcatraz (1962) .... Father Matthieu (uncredited)
- Kid Galahad (1962) .... Harry Sperling
- Twilight of Honor (1963) .... District Attorney Paul Farish
- The Unsinkable Molly Brown (1964) .... Monsignor Ryan
- Nevada Smith (1966) .... Paymaster
- Ride in the Whirlwind (1966) .... Evan
- The Flim-Flam Man (1967) .... Tetter
- The Learning Tree (1969) .... Jake Kiner
- The Andromeda Strain (1971) .... Jackson
- Two-Lane Blacktop (1971) .... Truck Driver at Accident

== Television career ==
Mitchell had roles on television in shows ranging from the 1950s dramas of the Golden Age of Television (such as Goodyear Television Playhouse, Westinghouse Studio One, and The United States Steel Hour) to the westerns of the 1960s (including Tales of Wells Fargo, Zane Grey Theater, Death Valley Days, Gunsmoke, Laramie, Bonanza, The Virginian, and Have Gun, Will Travel).

He was in the 1956 NBC adventure/musical The Adventures of Marco Polo, and several episodes of both The Twilight Zone and One Step Beyond. Another speciality was police/crime shows: Perry Mason, Peter Gunn, The Detectives Starring Robert Taylor, The Untouchables, Stoney Burke, Sam Benedict, and Naked City.

He even tried comedy (Hazel, The Ghost & Mrs. Muir, Bewitched), medical (Ben Casey), and science-fiction-adventure shows (Time Tunnel, Land of the Giants, and Voyage to the Bottom of the Sea). He was also on Daktari, Lassie, Run for Your Life, and the 1961 NBC series, The Americans, a dramatization of family divisions in the American Civil War.

On the 1960s gothic soap opera Dark Shadows, he originated the role of Matthew Morgan (later assumed by actor Thayer David).

== Selected Television Appearances ==
- Alfred Hitchcock Presents (1960) (Season 5 Episode 28: "Forty Detectives Later") as Munro Dean
- The Alfred Hitchcock Hour (1962) (Season 1 Episode 9: "The Black Curtain") as Druggist
- The Alfred Hitchcock Hour (1962) (Season 1 Episode 24: "The Star Juror") as Judge Higgins
- The Twilight Zone (1963) (Season 5 Episode 13: "Ring-a-Ding Girl") as Dr. Floyd
- The Alfred Hitchcock Hour (1965) (Season 3 Episode 19: "Wally the Beard") as Keefer

== Personal life ==
In 1940, he married Katherine Squire, with whom he often worked on stage, in film, and on television. He died on January 18, 1972, aged 66, of undisclosed causes, in Washington, D.C. Squire died in 1995.
