= My Name Is Nobody =

1973 film by Tonino Valerii

- Italian film poster by Renato Casaro
- Directed by: Tonino Valerii
- Screenplay by: Ernesto Gastaldi
- Story by: Fulvio Morsella; Ernesto Gastaldi
- Based on: An idea by Sergio Leone
- Produced by: Fulvio Morsella
- Starring: Terence Hill; Henry Fonda; Jean Martin
- Cinematography: Giuseppe Ruzzolini; Armando Nannuzzi; Sergio Salvati
- Edited by: Nino Baragli
- Music by: Ennio Morricone
- Production companies: Rafran Cinematografica; Les Filmes Jacques Leitienne; La Societe Im. Ex. Ci.; La Societe Alcinter; Rialto Film Preben Philpsen
- Distributed by: Titanus
- Release dates: 13 December 1973 (West Germany); 14 December 1973 (France); 21 December 1973 (Italy)
- Running time: 118 minutes
- Countries: Italy; France; West Germany
- Language: Italian
- Box office: ₤3.620 billion Italian lira (Italy) $10.6 million (Germany)

My Name Is Nobody (Italian: Il mio nome è Nessuno) is a 1973 comedy spaghetti Western starring Terence Hill and Henry Fonda. The film was directed by Tonino Valerii and based on an idea by Sergio Leone. The film follows the story of Nobody (Hill), who attempts to get his idol Jack Beauregard (Fonda) to take on the Wild Bunch gang of outlaws.

My Name is Nobody is an international co-production between Italy, West Germany and France. It was widely seen in Italy and Germany, but was not successful in the United States.

== Plot ==
In 1899, Jack Beauregard is an aging gunslinger who wants to retire peacefully to Europe. After watching him quickly shoot three gunmen who attempted to ambush him in a barbershop, the barber's son asks his father if anyone in the world is faster than Beauregard, to which the barber replies, "Faster than him? Nobody!"

Beauregard pauses to watch a young man catching fish by hitting them with a tree branch before continuing to an old goldmine. He finds his friend Red dying after an attack by a gang. Beauregard asks Red about the whereabouts of "Nevada"; Red manages to disclose only Nevada's village before dying. At a horse relay station, the young man is asked by three men to deliver a basket to Beauregard inside. He talks to Beauregard, revealing his detailed knowledge of Beauregard's feats. He throws the basket outside, where the bomb hidden within explodes.

The man introduces himself as "Nobody". He idolizes Beauregard and wants him to end his career in style by taking on all 150 of the Wild Bunch single-handed. The bandits are using a worthless gold mine to launder their stolen gold. Sullivan, the mine owner fronting for them, believes Beauregard is trying to kill him, so he tries to kill Beauregard first.

Arriving at Nevada's village, Beauregard finds Nobody already there, and he reveals that the Nevada Kid, Beauregard's brother, is dead. Nobody again unsuccessfully tries to get Beauregard to take on the Wild Bunch. Arriving in a town, Sullivan hires Nobody to kill Beauregard, but Nobody instead helps Beauregard to take out Sullivan's men. The Wild Bunch ride into town to collect sticks of dynamite, stashing them in their saddlebags.

Later, an old man tells Beauregard that he was bought out of a worthless gold mine by his partners Nevada and Red, only to have the mine produce much gold afterwards. Beauregard hurries off to the mine and catches Sullivan loading sacks of gold dust. Sullivan offers Beauregard Nevada's share, but Beauregard tells him he could not care less about his brother, and takes just two sacks, as well as $500 to pay for his passage to Europe. He then leaves to catch a train to New Orleans.

Nobody steals a train that is being loaded at a station with bars of gold, guarded by soldiers. Beauregard is waiting down the line when the Wild Bunch charge towards him across a featureless plain. Nobody arrives with the train, but refuses to rescue Beauregard until he "makes his name in the history books". Remembering the mirrored conchas on the gang's dynamite-filled saddlebags, Beauregard shoots them and takes out most of the gang until Nobody lets him board the train.

In New Orleans, Beauregard and Nobody duel in the street, with a photographer and many spectators on hand. Nobody is faster, and Beauregard falls to the ground, seemingly dead. The remaining members of the Wild Bunch see it and switch their search to the anonymous Nobody. Later, Nobody walks by the ship that was to take Beauregard to Europe. Beauregard is revealed to be in a cabin aboard, writing Nobody an affectionate farewell.

== Cast ==
- Terence Hill as Nobody
- Henry Fonda as Jack Beauregard
- Jean Martin as Sullivan
- R. G. Armstrong as Honest John
- Karl Braun as Jim
- Leo Gordon as Red
- Steve Kanaly as False Barber
- Geoffrey Lewis as Wild Bunch Leader
- Neil Summers as Squirrel
- Piero Lulli as Sheriff
- Mario Brega as Pedro
- Marc Mazza as Don John
- Benito Stefanelli as Porteley
- Alexander Allerson as Rex
- Rainer Peets as Big Gun
- Antoine Saint-John as Scape
- Franco Angrisano as Ferroviere
- Tommy Polgár as Juan
- Antonio Palombi as Dirty
- Hubert Mittendorf as Carnival Barker
- Emil Feist as Dwarf
- Carla Mancini as Mother
- Luigi Antonio Guerra as Official
- Angelo Novi as Bartender

== Production ==
Shooting for My Name Is Nobody started on April 30, 1973. It was one of the few films related to Sergio Leone where 80% of the outdoor scenes were actually shot in the United States. The film was shot in nine weeks.

Filming took place at Acoma Pueblo, the ghost town of Cabezon, the former mining town of Mogollon, the mission of San Esteban Del Rey in New Mexico, and the gypsum dunes at White Sands. Leone predominantly stayed at home for the shoot and went to join the crew for five days in New Orleans. Leone replaced director Tonino Valerii, who was suffering from an ear infection, for one day on the set.

Tensions rose on set between cinematographer Armando Nannuzzi and Valerii. Fonda was being told how to pick up money off the ground and was told two different ways to pick it up between Valerii and Nannuzzi. Their relationship became more intense, with Nannuzzi eventually leaving the film.

=== Directorial credit dispute ===
When the film began shooting in Spain in Almería and Guadix, Valerii had a new cinematographer Giuseppe Ruzzolini, with Sergio Salvati working as a cameraman, uncredited, for the sequences of the duel among mirrors and Nobody's meeting with Sullivan in the gambling room. A new problem arose on set when costumes for Henry Fonda vanished, leading to production stopping for nine days. This led to paying a high penalty to keep Fonda for a few days or postpone shooting until he was free again. Leone proposed to Valerii that they either cut 30 or 40 pages from the script or create a second unit to finish the film. Leone offered to take the second unit shots, which Valerii accepted. Claudio Mancini warned Valerii, stating that Leone would take credit for the film when they go back to Rome if he let him shoot anything. Valerii took over scenes involving Henry Fonda and the action sequences in the desert, while Leone directed the saloon scene with Terence Hill showing his gunslinger skills, parts of the sequences in the village festival, and the public urinal scene, which was not in the original script.

Assumptions range over how much Leone contributed to the film. Christopher Frayling wrote: "The most likely scenario is that Leone helped out on a duel, then took over second-unit work on 'the battle', and then directed the opening scenes and the carnival section of the film." John Landis, who has claimed to be an extra in the film, said: "We shot for a couple of weeks, among hundreds of extras on horseback, attacking and firing wildly. Fonda and Hill kept us all at bay. [...] Leone directed that battle on horseback." Neil Summers, who played Squirrel, stated that Leone "directed most of the scenes I was in [...] [Leone] worked slowly and was constantly trying new angles with his camera and new innovative shots with his actors." Valerii himself stated that "scenes filmed by Leone are: Terence Hill getting drunk in the saloon (but not the close-ups of that shattering glasses, I shot those myself; and also the footage of the betting, with Piero Lulli taking the money, is mine); the part of the sequence at the fair which starts from the moment where Nobody steals the apple from the boy, to the episode of the pies thrown at the negroes' faces; the digression in the public urinal, [...] and several close-ups of Nobody who, while Beauregard fights the Wild Bunch, takes note of the body count as if they were points at a game, another addition on the part of Leone, who thought it was a funny idea." Screenwriter Ernesto Gastaldi confirmed Valerii's comments stating that "Tonino shot the whole film, absolutely ON HIS OWN", and that Leone "organized a second unit crew and shot a couple of sequences, which in my opinion are the weakest in the film: the urinal, stretched in an abnormal way, and the glass contest in the saloon. Nothing else." Sergio Donati expanded on this, stating that some photographers were sent over by the press office, and asked Leone, who was on set for a single day, to sit behind camera in a director's pose with Valerii's permission. Donati stated that "inevitably, from that moment on, everyone, in and outside the movie business, started saying, 'Yeah, actually the real director of the film was Leone, who saved it from the disaster of an incapable director.'" Leone's own discussion following the film's release often contradicted itself.

== Release ==
Prior to its release in Italy, My Name Is Nobody was released in West Germany and France on December 13 and 14, respectively. In Germany, the movie sold about 6.2 million admissions. Italian audiences got to see it starting December 21, 1973, where it was distributed by Titanus. The film grossed over 3.6 billion lire and was the third-highest-grossing film in Italy of the year, behind Salvatore Samperi's Malicious (5.5 billion lire) and Dino Risi's Sessomatto. It grossed $10,638,297 in West Germany. In the United States, it was cut to 111 minutes and "nearly flopped", according to Italian film historian Roberto Curti.

In 2015, a novelization of the film by Michael R. Hudson was published in the United States by Raven Head Press as part of a series of adaptations of several of Gastaldi's scripts, including The Horrible Dr. Hichcock and The Case of the Bloody Iris.

== Themes ==
Roberto Curti reads the relationship between Jack Beauregard and Nobody as a generational clash between father and son, in which Beauregard is "a patent embodiment of the Hollywood Western" and Nobody represents its Italian equivalent, "both a filiation and a betrayal of the 'father.'" Sergio Leone's original idea was a Western adaptation of Homer's Odyssey, and Curti compares the pair to Polyphemus and Ulysses, "the fierce and powerful yet obtuse giant and the little man, weak but clever". He describes the ending as "a symbolic handover", after which "the Western changes domicile".

Writing in The New York Times, Vincent Canby described Nobody as a young man who does not want to see Beauregard "fade quietly into anonymity". At times he "seems to be a malignant clown who wants nothing more than to ridicule the older man", while at others he talks "half-seriously" about ways in which Beauregard "can realize his potential as a legend".

In The New Yorker, Penelope Gilliatt wrote that Valerii had turned the film "from a Western story of comic-strip bravery into one about skepticism, the pull of stardom", and an alliance between an aging gunman and a young admirer. She traced the theme of namelessness through the film, from a headstone that identifies a dead boy only as "The Nevada Kid", with "No name", to a hero who "proudly calls himself Nobody". In her reading, Beauregard understands that "the only way to become a nobody is to die", and would rather be "alive somewhere, boring and unknown" than in the record books.

== Reception ==
Vincent Canby in The New York Times considered the film "very entertaining", and it "is the kind of Western that only an immensely appreciative and witty Italian film maker could make." Penelope Gilliatt in The New Yorker said that the director "has turned the film from a Western story of comic-strip bravery into one about skepticism, the pull of stardom, and a reluctant alliance." Nick Schager of The A.V. Club found it "the definitive spaghetti Western parody."

On the review aggregator website Rotten Tomatoes, 100% of 7 critics' reviews are positive, with an average rating of 6.8/10. Metacritic, which uses a weighted average, assigned the film a score of 68 out of 100, based on 6 critics, indicating "generally favorable" reviews.
