= Ride in the Whirlwind =

1966 film by Monte Hellman

- US film poster
- Directed by: Monte Hellman
- Written by: Jack Nicholson
- Produced by: Jack Nicholson; Monte Hellman
- Starring: Jack Nicholson; Millie Perkins; Cameron Mitchell; Rupert Crosse
- Cinematography: Gregory Sandor
- Edited by: Monte Hellman
- Music by: Robert Drasnin
- Production companies: Proteus Films; Santa Clara Productions
- Distributed by: Jack H. Harris Enterprises; Favorite Films
- Release dates: October 23, 1966 (SFIFF); January 12, 1972 (Los Angeles)
- Running time: 82 minutes
- Country: United States
- Language: English
- Budget: $75,000

Ride in the Whirlwind is a 1966 American Western film edited and directed by Monte Hellman and starring Cameron Mitchell, Millie Perkins, Jack Nicholson, and Harry Dean Stanton. Nicholson also wrote and co-produced the film with Hellman. A trio of cowboys are forced to become outlaws due to a case of mistaken identity by the local authorities.

The film was shot in 1965 in the Utah desert, back-to-back with Hellman's similar The Shooting, which also starred Nicholson and Perkins.

== Plot ==
A gang of outlaws led by Blind Dick stop a stagecoach, kill the guard and rob the occupants. Another trio of cowboys, Vern, Wes and Otis, unknowingly come upon the gang's remote hideout and stop to rest for the night. Neither group of men trusts the other.

In the morning, they all find themselves surrounded by a vigilante hanging party, and a shootout ensues. The outlaws are burned out of their shed and Blind Dick and Indian Joe are hanged by the vigilante posse. Otis is shot as Vern and Wes flee, becoming fugitives in a case of mistaken identity and guilt by association.

Vern and Wes take refuge at a farm belonging to Evan, who lives with his wife and daughter. Although innocent and not villains, the two hold the family hostage until they can make an escape. After a member of the vigilantes passes by and questions Evan, the two try to escape taking Evan's horses. Evan shoots and wounds Vern, and Wes shoots and kills Evan.

Wes and Vern ride off together on one horse with the posse in pursuit. Eventually Vern can go no further and falls off the horse, saying "I've bought it." Dying, he tells Wes to ride off alone, that the horse cannot carry both of them.

As he dies, Vern holds off the posse and Wes rides off.

== Cast ==
- Cameron Mitchell as Vern
- Jack Nicholson as Wes
- Tom Filer as Otis
- Millie Perkins as Abigail
- Katherine Squire as Catherine
- George Mitchell as Evan
- Harry Dean Stanton as Blind Dick (credited as Dean Stanton)
- Rupert Crosse as Indian Joe
- B.J. Merholz as Edgar
- Peter Cannon as Hagerman
- Brandon Carroll as Quint Mapes
- John Hackett as Winslow
- William A. Keller as Roy
- Charles Eastman as Drummer
- Neil Summers as Ward

== Production ==
Hellman said that Roger Corman had agreed to put up funds for a Hellman-directed western at a lunch meeting at the old Brown Derby on Vine Street, just south of Hollywood Boulevard, one of a small chain of famous restaurants in Los Angeles (the famous hat-shaped location was on Wilshire Boulevard). By the end of the lunch, Corman had allowed that since Hellman was making one western, he might as well make two – presumably because, in the mind of the budget-conscious Corman, this would allow them to make two films for less than the usual cost.

The Shooting and Ride in the Whirlwind were made back-to-back, with The Shooting in production first. Hellman said that the crew and some cast members stayed on location, and, after taking a week's break, they began filming Ride in the Whirlwind. However, other than travel costs, shooting the two films back-to-back did not result in appreciable savings. Hellman stated that both films were made for under US$75,000 each (approximate total of $150,000 for two, provided by Roger Corman). Hellman and Jack Nicholson, who produced, wrote, and acted in Ride in the Whirlwind, and had a smaller role in The Shooting, had agreed that if they went over budget on either film, they would pay the overage out of their own pockets. Thus they were very careful to keep within the budget for each.

The films were shot in Eastman Color in Utah, in an area that has since been filled in with an artificial lake. Parts of the film were shot in Kanab Canyon, Calvin Johnson Ranch, Paria, and Glen Canyon in Utah. Hellman said that producers would sometimes hire him to find out where he had shot the films, then fire him once they knew. He stated that he was the last to film there because it was filled with water soon after. Both Ride in the Whirlwind and The Shooting feature the same reddish low mountains with white lines in the rock (possibly water marks from a past age when the area was a sea or lake).

Hellman said that he tended to cut out as much dialogue as he could. He preferred to tell the story visually. He avoided the obvious in terms of dialogue. Hellman stated that he oversaw the daily progress by the writers of the two films – and that they rented an office in the Writer's Building in Beverly Hills on little Santa Monica Blvd. One personal thrill for Hellman was that their rented office was next door to Fred Astaire's.

== Distribution ==
Hellman stated that both films were sold to a distributor who then sold them as part of a larger package of films to be shown on television. The films did play theatrically in France in 1969 and Hellman said they were hits, with The Shooting playing for a year in Paris and Ride in the Whirlwind playing for six months. Hellman stated that in the late sixties it meant a lot in Hollywood to be lionized in France and thus Hellman had a brief time of being very much in demand in Hollywood.

== Reception ==
On the review aggregator website Rotten Tomatoes, 93% of 14 critics' reviews are positive, with an average rating of 7.3/10.

== Thematic similarities ==
Both films involve a hunt. In the case of The Shooting, Nicholson is a hired gun and Warren Oates is an ex-bounty hunter turned miner. Both men are working for a woman who is tracking someone. The entire film and the suspense is largely based on this mysterious hunt. In Ride in the Whirlwind, vigilantes that began by tracking a gang who robbed a stagecoach end up mistakenly hunting down the Nicholson character and another man, innocent cowboys. Both films are considered acid westerns that express a rather bleak, minimalist quality that does not sentimentalize the Wild West. Both films end with the Nicholson character's facing bleak outcomes, almost certain death in The Shooting but a tinge of optimism the Whirlwind one will escape the leader of the posse's prediction that "They've seen their last sunrise."

== See also ==
- List of American films of 1965
