= Cockfighter =

1974 film by Monte Hellman

- US film poster
- Directed by: Monte Hellman
- Screenplay by: Charles Willeford
- Based on: Cockfighter; 1962 novel by Charles Willeford
- Produced by: Roger Corman
- Starring: Warren Oates; Richard B. Shull; Harry Dean Stanton; Patricia Pearcy; Millie Perkins
- Cinematography: Néstor Almendros
- Edited by: Lewis Teague
- Music by: Michael Franks
- Production companies: New World Pictures; Artists Entertainment Complex
- Distributed by: New World Pictures
- Release date: July 30, 1974 (Roswell, Georgia)
- Running time: 83 minutes
- Country: United States
- Language: English
- Budget: $400,000

Cockfighter (also known as Born to Kill, Gamblin' Man and Wild Drifter) is a 1974 drama film by director Monte Hellman, starring Warren Oates, Harry Dean Stanton and featuring Laurie Bird and Ed Begley, Jr. The screenplay is based on the 1962 novel of the same title by Charles Willeford.

== Plot ==
A mute Frank Mansfield is locked inside a trailer preparing his best cock for an upcoming fight. He slices the chicken's beak slightly so that it looks cracked in order to obtain higher betting odds in the upcoming fight. He bets his trailer, his girlfriend, and the remainder of his money with fellow cocker Jack. Mansfield loses the fight because of the cracked beak.

Frank visits his home town, his family farm, and his long-time fiancée, Mary Elizabeth. Mary Elizabeth has long grown tired of Mansfield's cockfighter ways and asks him to settle down with her. Frank decides in favor of cockfighting, leaves Mary Elizabeth, sells the family farm for money to reinvest in chickens, and starts a partnership with Omar Baradinsky. The partnership takes them all the way to the cockfighting championships.

== Cast ==
- Warren Oates as Frank Mansfield
- Richard B. Shull as Omar Baradansky
- Harry Dean Stanton as Jack Burke
- Ed Begley, Jr. as Tom Peeples
- Laurie Bird as Dody White Burke
- Troy Donahue as Randall Mansfield
- Warren Finnerty as Sanders
- Robert Earl Jones as Buford
- Patricia Pearcy as Mary Elizabeth
- Millie Perkins as Frances Mansfield
- Steve Railsback as Junior
- Tom Spratley as Mr. Peeples
- Charles Willeford as Ed Middleton
- Pete Munro as Packard
- Kermit Echols as Fred Reed

== Screenplay ==
Cockfighter re-released as Born to Kill. Film poster by John Solie

Willeford adapted the novel to the screen himself and made several major plot changes among many smaller changes in detail. The author indicated that Cockfighter is based loosely on the structure of the Odyssey. so it is most significant that the author removed the entire subplot with the beautiful widow Berenice, perhaps the Calypso character. Removing this character also excluded the protagonist's short-lived music career from the plot, although the movie does show Mansfield plucking a guitar at one point. Two other significant characters in the novel are also missing from the movie: Doc Riordan (a pharmacist/inventor who supplies Mansfield with conditioning medicines for his chickens) and the judge who sells the Mansfield farm. The final scene of the movie also presents a dramatic shift from the end of the book: Mansfield claims that Mary Elizabeth loves him as she walks off, whereas in the book he realizes that the relationship is over and he is free.

There are many subtle details changed in the movie, most of which are insignificant to the plot. For example, it is emphasized in the book that Icky is a rare blue chicken, whereas in the movie he is a white chicken called "White Lightning". The Mansfield farm is in Ocala, Florida in the book, in Decatur, Georgia in the movie. Possibly for some comic relief in the movie, Baradinsky goes back to the motel tournament, rather than driving on to a separate tournament as in the novel. He hides his cash under the dead chickens in the bathtub and does not lose money like everyone else in the holdup. By the time of the Milledgeville, Georgia tournament, Middleton's wife had died in the book, but in the movie Middleton (played by Willeford himself) refers to his wife as living. And finally, in the movie, Mansfield does not "regain" his voice until after Mary Elizabeth leaves.

== Reception ==
The film struggled to find an audience; it was largely ignored by critics and moviegoers at the time. Roger Corman said that it was the only movie that he backed in the 1970s that lost money. He had it re-cut and re-released under the title Born to Kill, but it still did not succeed.

== Bibliography ==
- Simpson, Paul (26 May 2011). Movie Lists: 397 Ways to Pick a DVD. Profile Books. pp. 261–. ISBN 978-1-84765-355-0.
- Stevens, Brad (18 March 2003). Monte Hellman: His Life and Films. McFarland. pp. 187–. ISBN 978-0-7864-8188-0.
