= Neil Summers =

English-American actor and stuntman (1944–2025)

- Born: 28 April 1944; London, England
- Died: 4 September 2025 (aged 81); Kanab, Utah, U.S.
- Occupations: Actor; stuntman
- Years active: 1963–2025

Neil Summers (28 April 1944 – 4 September 2025) was an English-American actor and stuntman. He was best known for playing the Rodent in the 1990 film Dick Tracy.

== Life and career ==
Summers was born in London, England on 28 April 1944. He began his screen career in 1963, traveling to Tucson, Arizona to appear in the film McLintock! as a stunt extra. During his screen career, he was a stunt double for several actors including Warren Oates, Roddy McDowall, Michael Anderson Jr. and Michael J. Pollard.

Summers guest-starred in numerous television programs including Gunsmoke, Bonanza, Barnaby Jones, Death Valley Days, The High Chaparral, The Fall Guy, Petrocelli and Daniel Boone. He also appeared in numerous films including Ride In The Whirlwind, Duel at Diablo, Heaven with a Gun, El Dorado, True Grit, The Greatest Story Ever Told, Rio Lobo, RoboCop, Wild At Heart, Rough Night in Jericho, The Shawshank Redemption and Guns of a Stranger.

== Death ==
Summers died in Kanab, Utah, on 4 September 2025, at the age of 81.
