= Monte Hellman =

American film director, producer and editor (1929–2021)

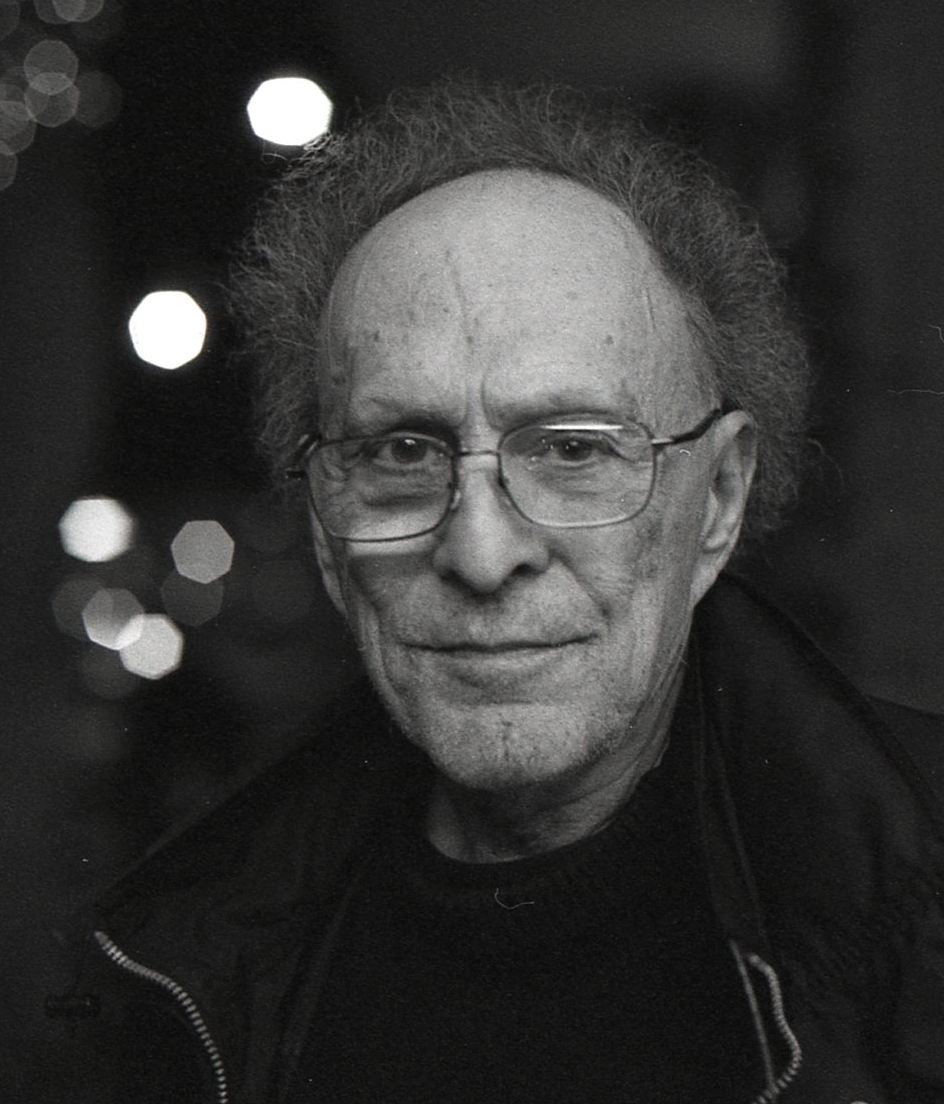
- Hellman in 2013
- Born: Monte Jay Himmelbaum; July 12, 1929; New York City, New York, U.S.
- Died: April 20, 2021 (aged 91); Rancho Mirage, California, U.S.
- Education: Los Angeles High School
- Alma mater: Stanford University
- Occupations: Film director, writer, producer, editor
- Known for: Two-Lane Blacktop, Reservoir Dogs
- Spouse: Barboura Morris (1954–1958)

Monte Hellman (/ˈmɒnti/; born Monte Jay Himmelbaum; July 12, 1929 – April 20, 2021) was an American film director, producer, writer, and editor. Hellman began his career as an editor's apprentice at ABC TV, and made his directorial debut with the horror film Beast from Haunted Cave (1959), produced by Gene Corman, Roger Corman's brother.

He would later gain critical recognition for the Westerns The Shooting and Ride in the Whirlwind (both 1966) starring Jack Nicholson, the road movie Two-Lane Blacktop (1971) starring James Taylor and Dennis Wilson, and the drama film Cockfighter (1974) starring Warren Oates. His later directorial work included the 1989 slasher film Silent Night, Deadly Night 3: Better Watch Out! and the independent thriller Road to Nowhere (2010). Hellman also served as an executive producer on Quentin Tarantino's Reservoir Dogs (1992).

== Early life ==
Monte Hellman was born on July 12, 1929, in Greenpoint, Brooklyn, to Gertrude (née Edelstein) and Fred Himmelbaum, who were vacationing in New York at the time of his birth. The family ended up settling in Albany, New York, before relocating to Los Angeles, California, when Hellman was 5 years old.

Hellman graduated from Los Angeles High School, and attended Stanford University, graduating in 1951. He then attended graduate school at the University of California, Los Angeles, but did not complete his studies.

== Career ==
Hellman was among a group of directing talent mentored by Roger Corman, who produced several of the director's early films. Hellman began by working on "low budget exploitation films with a personal slant," yet learned from Corman the art of producing commercially viable films on a tight budget while staying true to a personal vision. Hellman's most critically acclaimed film is considered to be Two-Lane Blacktop (1971), a road movie that was a box-office failure at the time of its initial release but, according to Danny Peary in 1981, it has become a perennial cult favorite.

Hellman's two acid westerns starring Jack Nicholson, Ride in the Whirlwind and The Shooting, both shot in 1965 and premiered at festivals in 1966 before being widely released directly to television in 1968, have also developed followings, particularly the latter. Hellman and his stuntman, Gary Kent, talk about the making of the westerns in the 2018 documentary Danger God aka Love and Other Stunts. A third western, China 9, Liberty 37 (1978), was far less successful critically, although it too has its admirers, as do Cockfighter (1974) (aka Born to Kill) and Iguana (1988). In 1989, he directed the straight-to-video slasher film Silent Night, Deadly Night 3: Better Watch Out!

In addition to his directorial career, Hellman worked on several films in different capacities. He was the dialogue director for Corman's The St. Valentine's Day Massacre (1967), and second-unit director on Paul Verhoeven's RoboCop (1987). Hellman finished two pictures in post-production that were started by other directors who died after the movies were shot, the Muhammad Ali bio The Greatest (1977) (started by Tom Gries) and Avalanche Express (1979) (begun by Mark Robson). He shot extra footage for the television versions of Ski Troop Attack (1960), Last Woman on Earth (1960), Creature from the Haunted Sea (1961) and Sergio Leone's A Fistful of Dollars (1964). Among the movies on which Hellman served as editor are Corman's The Wild Angels (1966), Bob Rafelson's Head (1968), Sam Peckinpah's The Killer Elite (1975), and Jonathan Demme's Fighting Mad (1976). He was an executive producer on Quentin Tarantino's debut feature Reservoir Dogs (1992).

In 2006, he directed "Stanley's Girlfriend", a section of the omnibus horror film Trapped Ashes. Hellman's section of the film was presented by the Cannes Film Festival that year out of competition as an "Official Selection," and Hellman was named president of the festival's "Un Certain Regard" jury.

At the 2010 Venice Film Festival, he was awarded a special career prize. Later in the year he completed a new feature film, the romantic noir thriller Road to Nowhere, which competed for the Golden Lion at the 67th Venice International Film Festival.

As of 2011, he taught with the Film Directing Program at the California Institute of the Arts.

== Death ==
Hellman fell at his home on April 19, 2021. In critical condition, he died the next day at the Eisenhower Medical Center in Rancho Mirage, California, at the age of 91.

== Filmography ==
=== Films ===
Year	Title	Notes
1959	Beast from Haunted Cave	
1964	Flight to Fury	also co-storywriter and editor
1964	Back Door to Hell	
1966	Ride in the Whirlwind	also editor and co-producer
1966	The Shooting	also editor and co-producer
1971	Two-Lane Blacktop	also editor
1974	Cockfighter	
1978	China 9, Liberty 37	also known as Amore piombo e furore, co-producer
1981	Inside the Coppola Personality	documentary short
1988	Iguana	
1989	Silent Night, Deadly Night 3: Better Watch Out!	also co-storywriter
2006	Trapped Ashes	segment: "Stanley's Girlfriend"
2010	Road to Nowhere	also co-producer
2013	Vive l'amour	short, for Venezia 70 Future Reloaded initiative

=== Other film work ===
- A Fistful of Dollars (1964; director of 1977 ABC TV version prologue)
- The Killer Elite (1975; co-editor)
- The Greatest (1977; finished film on behalf of Tom Gries, post-production supervisor)
- Avalanche Express (1979; finished film on behalf of Mark Robson, post-production supervisor)
- RoboCop (1987; uncredited second-unit director, he directed several action scenes on behalf of Paul Verhoeven)
- Reservoir Dogs (1992; executive producer and uncredited writer)

== Bibliography ==
- Dixon, Wheeler Winston (2007). Film Talk: Directors at Work. Rutgers University Press. ISBN 978-0-8135-4078-8.
