= Kissyfur =

American animated series (1986–1988)

- Genre: Animation
- Created by: Phil Mendez
- Voices of: Ed Gilbert; Marilyn Lightstone; Tress MacNeille; Terence McGovern; Max Meier; Stu Rosen; Neil Ross; Susan Silo; Russi Taylor; B. J. Ward; Lennie Weinrib; Frank Welker; R. J. Williams
- Composers: Haim Saban; Shuki Levy
- Country of origin: United States
- Original language: English
- No. of seasons: 2
- No. of episodes: 26

Production
- Executive producers: Andy Heyward; Jean Chalopin (season 1)
- Running time: 30 minutes
- Production companies: NBC Productions; DIC Animation City; Saban Entertainment (1988)

Original release
- Network: NBC
- Release: September 13, 1986 – December 3, 1988

Kissyfur is an American animated children's television series which aired on NBC. Created by Phil Mendez, the series was produced by NBC Productions in cooperation with DIC Animation City. The series was based on a half-hour NBC special called Kissyfur: Bear Roots and was followed by three more specials until its Saturday morning debut. The show ran for two seasons between 1986 and 1988.

== Plot ==
The show follows the adventures of Gus and Kissyfur, a father and son bear who have joined the circus. One day, the circus train derails and the bears escape to a new life in the swamps of Paddlecab County, somewhere in the Southeastern United States. There, they protect the local swamp's inhabitants from the hungry, bumbling alligators Floyd and Jolene. Kissyfur and his father use the skills they have acquired from the human world to create a boat tour business, transporting other animals and their products down the river.

== Characters ==
=== Adults ===
- Gus (voiced by Ed Gilbert) is Kissyfur's widowed father, who owns a Paddlecab company, taxiing animals from one side of the swamp to the other. He can be a bit goofy at times, but is a very good father. He is the only one of all the swamp parents who can take on both alligators, Floyd and Jolene, and run them off.
- Miss Emmy Lou (voiced by Russi Taylor) is a blue bear who wears a flower behind one ear. She is the schoolteacher in the swamp and has a Southern accent. She is also an excellent cook and has a sister named Jenny Lou, a niece named Donna and a cousin named Ernie. She is sweet on Gus and serves as his love interest.
- Charles (voiced by Lennie Weinrib) is a warthog and Lennie's stubborn father. Charles thinks he has everything figured out most of the time, but is usually more brawn than brains. He has several conflicts with Gus. He is strong enough to take on Jolene, but not Floyd. He is one of the only three adults to be captured and almost eaten by the gators, along with the Cackle Sisters.
- Howie (voiced by Frank Welker) is a mocking bird who can throw his voice and can mimic anything and everyone. This talent often gets him into trouble.
- Uncle Shelby (voiced by Frank Welker) is a wise turtle who is the elder of the swamp.
- The Cackle Sisters (portrayed by Russi Taylor and Frank Welker) are two chicken sisters named Bessie and Claudette. Bessie talks and is very prim and proper, while Claudette just clucks, usually agreeing with whatever her sister says. They are usually seen keeping watch for Floyd and Jolene on a large, floating buoy and are quick to ring a bell whenever they catch sight of them. They are two of the only three adults to be captured and almost eaten by the gators, along with Charles.
- Floyd (voiced by Stu Rosen) is an alligator who, along with his sister, Jolene, is always hatching a plan to capture the swamp cubs so they can eat them for dinner (though if the opportunity arises, they may sometimes go after the adults, as well). He often makes dimwitted remarks.
- Jolene (voiced by Terence McGovern) is a hot-tempered alligator who wears a red wig. She and Floyd are always trying to capture the swamp cubs so they can eat them for dinner (though if the opportunity arises, they may sometimes go after the adults, as well). She would be considered the brains between the two, but not by much. She has a low tolerance for Floyd's dimwittedness, which usually results in her smacking him with her wig.
- Flo (voiced by Marilyn Lightstone) is a smug buzzard. Her companion is a snake named Reggie.

=== Swamp cubs ===
- Kissyfur (voiced by R. J. Williams and later Max Meier) is Gus's son, the leader of the swamp cubs, and the title character of the series. He and his father used to work in a circus, along with Kissyfur's mother, who died in a performance accident. After the circus train they were on crashed, Kissyfur and his father ran into Paddlecab County, and that is where they have been living since. He is an eight-year-old bear cub who loves to pretend and occasionally gets into trouble with the rest of the cubs. His name is a malapropism of the name Christopher as Phil Mendez named the character after his son.
- Stuckey (voiced by Stu Rosen) is an indigo porcupine who is very gloomy. He talks slowly and is the quiet one of the group. He is also Duane's best friend and is the only swamp cub whose family is not seen. According to the revised writer's bible, Stuckey was an orphan found on a road, and adopted by an unseen family of possums. He is also the only swamp cub not to speak in the pilot.
- Beehonie (voiced by Russi Taylor) is a white rabbit who has a crush on Kissyfur, because she is the same age as he is. She is the only female swamp cub and tends to act as the voice of reason at times.
- Duane (voiced by Neil Ross) is an eleven-year-old pig who loves to clean, similar to Felix Unger of The Odd Couple, with the manners and attitude of Truman Capote. He is Stuckey's best friend.
- Toot (voiced by Russi Taylor) is a three-year-old beaver and the youngest of the swamp cubs. He looks up to and idolizes Kissyfur. He is Kissyfur's best friend. His nose changes from pink to black in season two.
- Lennie (voiced by Lennie Weinrib) is Charles's son. Lennie is ten years old and was the leader of the swamp cubs prior to Kissyfur's arrival (after which leadership transferred to him without much explanation). He enjoys being bossy and pushing the other cubs around, although despite this, he does like and care about his friends. He often refers to Kissyfur as "Sissyface".
- Ralph (voiced by Susan Silo) is a young pack rat, the same age as Kissyfur. He is a kind of cub rebel.
- Flip (voiced by Tress MacNeille) is a tricky chameleon that can change colors. In season 1, he had a red color for the top of His body, yellow with red spots in the middle, and blue with a light-blue spot and in between. In season 2, he has a green body, with a yellow stomach, but can still change colors.
- Donna (voice by Russi Taylor) is Miss Emmy Lou's niece. Her only appearance is in the second special, "The Birds and the Bears".

== Cast ==
- Ed Gilbert – Gus
- Marilyn Lightstone – Flo
- Tress MacNeille – Flip
- Terence McGovern – Jolene
- Max Meier – Kissyfur (season 2)
- Stu Rosen – Floyd
- Neil Ross – Duane
- Susan Silo – Ralph
- Russi Taylor – Beehonie, Toot, Miss Emmy Lou, Bessie Cackle, Donna
- Lennie Weinrib – Lennie, Charles
- Frank Welker – Howie, Uncle Shelby, Claudette Cackle
- R. J. Williams – Kissyfur (season 1)

=== Additional voices ===
- Brian Cummings
- Jeannie Elias
- Ron Feinberg
- Linda Gary
- Barbara Goodson
- Michael Horton
- Mona Marshall
- John Stephenson
- Jill Wayne

== Crew ==
- Stu Rosen - voice and casting director
- Victor Villegas - talent coordinator

== Episodes ==
=== Season 1 (1985–1986) ===
The first four episodes were primetime specials aired between 1985 and 1986.

No.	Title	Directed by	Written by	Original release date	Prod. code
1	"Bear Roots"	Unknown	Unknown	December 22, 1985	101
Kissyfur is a circus bear cub who recently lost his mother, who was tragically killed during a circus performance. After a particularly taxing night performing in the circus, Kissyfur and his father Gus escape captivity in order to live a better life in a swamp, far away from human civilization. Instead of living peacefully, however, the two soon discover that their new home (the swamp), while much more friendly than the circus, has its shares of dangers, namely the local alligators, when a famine hits the swamp.
2	"The Birds & The Bears"	Unknown	Unknown	March 30, 1986	104
The arrival of a new, female swamp cub has the boys making a serious personality change (except Toot).
3	"The Lady is a Chump"	Unknown	Unknown	June 1, 1986	105
Gus hires a seemingly reputable nanny to care for Kissyfur, but the "nanny" is Floyd in disguise.
4	"We are the Swamp"	Unknown	Unknown	July 6, 1986	112
A massive drought has turned the swamp into a veritable wasteland, but buzzard tells the cubs about a verdant oasis which is on top of the clouds.
5	"Here's the Beef/Jam Wars"	Unknown	Unknown	September 13, 1986	103
Kissyfur and the others have difficulty finding a good tree to construct a treehouse, but Brutus the bull attacks them. / Paddlecab's population take refuge in a dilapidated mansion during a flood.
6	"The Humans Must Be Crazy/To Tell the Tooth!"	Unknown	Unknown	September 20, 1986	110
Kissyfur and the Cubs befriend a robot, which they utilize to make their lives easier. / Gus tries to hide a toothache from Kissyfur, but when Kissyfur overhears Shelby's diagnosis about the problem, he thinks it means his father wants to disinherit him and runs away.
7	"Whale of a Tail/Kissyfur P.I."	Unknown	Unknown	September 27, 1986	106
The cubs tend to a sick, beached whale. / When various items go missing, Kissyfur leads the cubs to find the culprit, but the spotlight of suspicion is on Ralph Packrat.
8	"Home Sweat Home/Pooped Pop"	Unknown	Unknown	October 4, 1986	102
Tired of seemingly endless chores and grueling homework, the cubs sneak off to build a club house on an island away from grown-ups, but encounter trouble from gators and the island's dangerous elements. / Gus' constant sleeping interrupts life in the swamp. When Shelby realizes Gus is hibernating, the cubs need to make Spring arrive quickly.
9	"Bear Who Cried Wolf!/Egg McGuffin"	Unknown	Unknown	October 11, 1986	107
Kissyfur and Howie's practical jokes put them in danger. / Kissyfur raises and hatches a doofus bird, which causes more mayhem than necessary for all involved.
10	"Drop Me a Lion/The Wishing Box"	Unknown	Unknown	October 18, 1986	113
A circus friend of Gus, a lion visits the swamp. / Kissyfur and Toot find what they think is a magic box that can grants wishes.
11	"Gatoraid/Basket Case"	Unknown	Unknown	October 25, 1986	109
A Gargantuan Gator who is more menacing than Floyd or Jolene goes to defeat Gus. / During a hike, the Cubs find a human baby while trying to escape the gators and avoid being spotted by the baby's family.
12	"The Incredible Hunk/Double Dare Bear"	Unknown	Unknown	November 1, 1986	108
After Gus and Emmy Lou fight, Kissyfur, Toot, and Stuckey see her with another bear, so they try to break them up. / With the circus returning to the swamp, Lenny double dares Kissyfur to take the cubs and show them his old tricks.
13	"Bearly a Bodyguard/The Duck Who Came to Dinner"	Unknown	Unknown	November 8, 1986	111
Tired of Lenny bullying the cubs, Kissyfur hires Howie to act like his bodyguard. / A freeloading duck moves in with Kissyfur and Gus after he fakes an injury.

=== Season 2 (1988) ===
No.	Title	Directed by	Written by	Original release date
1	"The Great Swamp Swami/The Shell Game"	Unknown	Unknown	September 10, 1988
When Kissyfur learns of the legend of the Great Swamp Swami, Howie and the gators decide to get in on the fun. / When Shelby's shell goes missing, it is up to Kissyfur to figure out who the thief is.
2	"Just in Time/Three's a Crowd"	Unknown	Unknown	September 17, 1988
Charles discovers an alarm clock and appoints himself timekeeper. / The warthog family's house catches fire, so Kissyfur invites then to stay with him and Gus.
3	"My Fair Lenny/G'Day Gator and G'Bye"	Unknown	Unknown	September 24, 1988
Lenny tries to impress a girl warthog by being charming, and at the same time is being considered for his father's club "The Slobs". / When Shelby leads the cubs on a hike, they encounter a Gator-fighting wallaby from Australia.
4	"Fork-Tongued Frog/Like Father, Like Son"	Unknown	Unknown	October 1, 1988
A frog convinces Beehonie that he is really a prince. / Kissyfur and Gus trade places for a day.
5	"Berried Alive/Toot's Treasure"	Unknown	Unknown	October 8, 1988
Kissyfur and Beehonie go into the berry juice business, but difference of opinion splits the partners, and the rest of the cubs. / Floyd and Toot both separately discover an abandoned ship full of candy. Lenny convinces Toot to show him where the treasure is.
6	"Cub's Club/You Ain't Nothin' But a Hound Dog"	Unknown	Unknown	October 15, 1988
Duane and Lenny have a contest to determine who will be their club's official interior decorator. / Kissyfur and the others help a hunter's elderly dog avoid going to the pound.
7	"Stuck with Stuckey/Flipzilla"	Unknown	Unknown	October 22, 1988
Stuckey is hired to babysit Lenny's twin cousins. / While Emmy Lou watches over Kissyfur for a week, Flip gains superpowers, from a meteorite.
8	"The New Cub/Comrade Kissyfur"	Unknown	Unknown	October 29, 1988
Randolph the mole joins the cubs, but the others are hesitant to hang out with him because he cannot see in daylight. / A monkey cosmonaut from the Soviet Union finds his way to Paddlecab County.
9	"See You Later, Annie Gator/Evilfur"	Unknown	Unknown	November 5, 1988
The cubs and the gators object to the new friendship of Toot and Jolene's niece. / When Kissyfur and Gus go on vacation, Two bears who escaped from a zoo, take their place and cause havoc in the swamp.
10	"Swarm Outside/Halo & Goodbye"	Unknown	Unknown	November 12, 1988
Charles and Lenny's garbage dump in the stream results in a chain reaction of events. / The cubs think Lenny is dead after an accident, so he pretends to be a ghost to get the cubs to do his bidding.
11	"The Ballad of Rebel Racoon/Somethin' Cajun's Cookin'"	Unknown	Unknown	November 19, 1988
Thinking Beehonie is interested in a free-spirited Raccoon, Kissyfur begins acting reckless to regain her friendship. / Emmy Lou's sister Jenny Lou comes for a visit, so Miss Emmy opens a restaurant in order to impress her.
12	"Got Those Baby Blues/Home Sweet Swamp"	Unknown	Unknown	November 26, 1988
Kissyfur's aunt Julia visits the swamp and gives birth to a son, and feeling ignored, Kissyfur goes to get their attention. / Due to a misunderstanding, when Julia and Bud along with their son are just about ready go back to the Circus, Kissyfur considers returning to the circus.
13	"The Great Swamp Taxi Race/Weight Not Want Not"	Unknown	Unknown	December 3, 1988
Charles gets a gas-powered boat in order to compete with Gus' paddle cab business. / Thinking Emmy Lou wants him to lose weight, Gus resorts to hypnosis, but accidentally becomes afraid of food, thanks to Charles' involvement.

== International release ==
The show also aired on the BBC as part of its But First This lineup, TCC and Nickelodeon in the UK, TRT in Turkey, ATV World in Hong Kong, SABC 1 and SABC 2 in South Africa, TVP in Poland, TV3 in New Zealand, Sirasa TV and Channel One (formerly MTV) in Sri Lanka, SBT in Brazil, MediaCorp Channel 5 and Prime 12 in Singapore, JBC, SSTV (Super Supreme Television) and Television Jamaica in Jamaica, RTB in Brunei, Namibian Broadcasting Corporation in Namibia, GMA Network in the Philippines, Armed Forces Network in Germany, Canal+ in France, Israeli Educational Television in Israel, NCRV in the Netherlands and Seven Network in Australia.

== Reception ==
Charles Solomon of the Los Angeles Times observed that "the lush backgrounds and some of the character designs owe a lot to Walt Kelly's "Pogo"; all that's missing is the imagination, wit and draftsmanship". He criticized that "the directors time the comedy material so badly that the jokes land with a thud". In 2014, Rob Bricken of io9 included Kissyfur in his list of a "dozen '80s cartoons that don't deserve to be remembered at all, let alone fondly".
