= Adventures of the Queen =

1975 film

- Written by: John Gay
- Directed by: David Lowell Rich
- Starring: Robert Stack; David Hedison; Ralph Bellamy; Bradford Dillman
- Music by: Richard LaSalle
- Country of origin: United States
- Original language: English

Production
- Producer: Irwin Allen
- Production locations: RMS Queen Mary - 1126 Queens Highway, Long Beach, California
- Cinematography: Jack Woolf
- Editor: Bill Brame
- Running time: 98 minutes
- Production companies: 20th Century Fox Television; Irwin Allen Productions
- Budget: $1 million

Original release
- Network: CBS
- Release: February 14, 1975

Adventures of the Queen is a 1975 American made-for-television drama film starring Robert Stack. It was made as a pilot for a potential TV series but screened as a stand-alone TV movie.

== Plot ==
Captain James Morgan and Dr. Peter Brooks on a cruise liner have to deal with various crises, including a hidden bomb, a suicide attempt and J. L. Dundeen, a millionaire.

== Cast ==
- Robert Stack as Captain James Morgan
- David Hedison as Dr .Peter Brooks
- Ralph Bellamy as J. L. Dundeen
- Bradford Dillman as Martin Reed
- Sorrell Booke as Robert Dwight
- Burr DeBenning as Ted Trevor
- John Randolph as John Howe
- Ellen Weston as Ann Trevor
- Linden Chiles as Matthew Evans
- Sheila Matthews as Claudine Lennart
- Mills Watson as Jim Greer
- Frank Marth as Phillips

== Production ==
It was the first of three movies Irwin Allen did for TV in the wake of the success of The Towering Inferno, the others being The Swiss Family Robinson and Time Travelers. Each was made through 20th Century Fox for $1 million but was done for different networks. They were all done as pilots for potential TV series.

"I missed television," said Allen. "There's a hysteria and an excitement in television that exists nowhere else in business." Allen called the film "Son of Poseidon Adventure." It was mostly shot on the Queen Mary in Long Beach.
