= Hanging by a Thread (1979 film) =

- Written by: Adrian Spies
- Directed by: Georg Fenady
- Starring: Sam Groom, Patty Duke, Donna Mills, Oliver Clark, Cameron Mitchell
- Composer: Richard LaSalle
- Country of origin: United States
- Original language: English

Production
- Producer: Irwin Allen
- Running time: 196 minutes
- Production companies: Irwin Allen Productions; Warner Bros. Television

Original release
- Network: NBC
- Release: May 8, 1979

Hanging by a Thread is a 1979 television disaster movie starring Sam Groom about friends stranded in a disabled cable-car above a ravine. The film premiered on NBC on May 6th, 1979. The occupants of the cable car reflect on the past as the film flashes back and forth to show each of the character's lives. It was written by Adrian Spies, directed by Georg Fenady and produced by Irwin Allen. The film co-starred Patty Duke, Donna Mills, Oliver Clark and Cameron Mitchell.

== Cast ==
- Sam Groom as Paul Craig
- Patty Duke as Sue Grainger
- Joyce Bulifant as Anita Minton
- Oliver Clark as Eddie Minton
- Bert Convy as Alan Durant
- Burr DeBenning as Jim Grainger
- Peter Donat as Mr. Durant
- Donna Mills as Ellen Craig
- Cameron Mitchell as Lawton
- Roger Perry as Mitchell
- Lonny Chapman as Charles Minton

== Reception ==
The New York Times called it "modest, predictable and not very thrilling."

It was repeated in 1981.
