= Busting =

1974 American crime film by Peter Hyams

- Theatrical release poster
- Directed by: Peter Hyams
- Written by: Peter Hyams
- Produced by: Robert Chartoff; Irwin Winkler
- Starring: Elliott Gould; Robert Blake; Allen Garfield; Antonio Fargas; Sid Haig; Michael Lerner
- Cinematography: Earl Rath
- Edited by: James Mitchell
- Music by: Billy Goldenberg
- Production company: Chartoff-Winkler Productions
- Distributed by: United Artists
- Release dates: February 6, 1974 (Los Angeles); February 27, 1974 (New York City)
- Running time: 91 minutes
- Country: United States
- Language: English

Busting is a 1974 American buddy cop film, directed by Peter Hyams in his theatrical directorial debut, starring Elliott Gould and Robert Blake as police detectives of the Los Angeles Police Department (LAPD). The film was the main inspiration for the cop series Starsky & Hutch, which premiered in 1975 and, like this film, also featured Antonio Fargas.

In the film, the honest efforts of the two detectives against organized crime are undermined by police corruption and by the influence of a local crime boss over the police department. They are sent to police gay bars instead. The detectives resort to harassing the crime boss and his family, until uncovering evidence of drug trafficking in a hospital which counted the crime boss as a patient. The crime boss states to them that he cannot be convicted on circumstantial evidence, and dares them to shoot him. Busting was the last film Blake starred in before his fame reached greater heights with the cop drama series Baretta.

== Plot summary ==
Keneely and Farrell are detectives with the Los Angeles Police Department (LAPD) vice squad. Although they show great talent for breaking up prostitution and drug rings, many of these enterprises are protected by crime boss Carl Rizzo, who exerts his influence throughout the city and the department. Evidence is altered before trial, colleagues refuse to help with basic police work, and the detectives are pushed to pursue other cases—mostly stakeouts on gay bars and public lavatories.

After confronting Rizzo, Keneely and Farrell are brutally beaten while investigating one of his prostitutes. Frustrated but without any legal options, they resort to harassing Rizzo and his establishments, warding off customers and following his family around the city. Soon, Rizzo is rushed to the hospital for a heart condition. Realizing that he also used a medical emergency as an alibi during a previous drug sale, Keneely and Farrell head to the hospital and discover that drugs are changing hands there, hidden in flower pots. Rizzo escapes in an ambulance, while Keneely and Farrell make chase in another. The chase ends when both ambulances crash; although Keneely holds Rizzo at gunpoint, Rizzo laughs that the evidence against him is circumstantial—and, at most, will result in a light sentence.

The film ends on a freeze-frame of Keneely's face as Rizzo dares him to shoot. In a voice-over, Keneely applies to an employment agency, claiming that he does not know why he left his job at the LAPD—finally concluding that he "needed a change".

== Cast ==
- Elliott Gould as Det. Michael Keneely
- Robert Blake as Det. Patrick Farrell
- Allen Garfield as Carl Rizzo
- Antonio Fargas as Stephen
- Michael Lerner as Marvin
- Ivor Francis as Judge Fred R. Simpson
- William Sylvester as Mr. Weldman

== Production ==
Robert Chartoff wanted to make another film about vice cops after The New Centurions. Peter Hyams was engaged to write and direct one off the back of the success of his TV movie, Goodnight, My Love. "I'd made a TV movie of the week that people had liked, and people started coming after me," he recalled. "The producers Robert Chartoff and Irwin Winkler came to me and said they wanted to do a film about vice cops. I said okay, and spent about six months researching it."

Hyams later said "like a journalist, I went around to New York, Boston, Chicago and Los Angeles and spoke with hookers, pimps, strippers and cops and DAs. Every episode in the film was true." Elliott Gould was offered the lead role after Hyams saw him on The Dick Cavett Show.

In February 1973, Ron Leibman was cast as Gould's partner. Leibman was soon fired. Hyams says, "It turned out the contrast between Ron and Elliott Gould was not the same contrast between Robert Blake and Elliott, so it was suggested we go with Robert and I listened." Gould says that while he respected Leibman as an actor it was he who suggested Leibman be replaced. "I just had a sense that I don't know if he's the right partner for me."

Filming started in February 1973. The film was shot over 35 days. "United Artists was a dream studio," said Hyams. "Once they thought the script and the people making the film were good, they really didn't intrude. They were very encouraging, and fabulous for filmmakers."

== Reception ==
The film was not a popular success. Vincent Canby of The New York Times wrote, "It's not great but it's a cool, intelligent variation on a kind of movie that by this time can be most easily identified by the license numbers on the cars in its chase sequences ... Mr. Hyams, who wrote and directed 'Busting,' brings off something of a feat by making a contemporary cop film that is tough without exploiting the sort of right-wing cynicism that tells us all to go out and buy our own guns." Gene Siskel of the Chicago Tribune gave the film 2 stars out of 4 and wrote that the disillusionment of the two main characters "is hardly made significant to us," as "the script fails to give either Gould or Blake an opportunity to establish their personal history. Here we have two actors who are strongly identified as rebellious types, and yet the script never once permits them to explain their motivation to become police officers." Arthur D. Murphy of Variety called it "a confused, compromised and clumsy concoction of unmitigated vulgarity" and "a total shambles," with "a couple of well-staged vehicle chases" among the film's few bright spots. Kevin Thomas of the Los Angeles Times slammed the film as "an abomination through and through. It may earn the distinction of insulting both the Police Department and the homosexual citizenry of Los Angeles equally." Thomas explained that "the film's humor is burlesque-based rather than satirical, which means that the unthinking and the bigoted are invited to laugh at some of the most oppressed and persecuted segments of an all-too-hypocritical and ignorant society." In a 1977 interview, Blake called Busting a mistake and did not appear in another theatrical release for six years.

== Controversy ==
The film was criticized for homophobia on the grounds of its depictions of gay characters and the attitudes of the lead characters towards them. In an essay for The New York Times, journalist and gay rights activist Arthur Bell condemned the film for derogatory language used by characters to describe homosexuals, as well as a scene in a gay bar that he called "exploitative, unreal, unfunny and ugly" for its presentation of gay stereotypes. Hyams defended this on the ground it was accurate to the milieu depicted.
