= Everything's Ducky =

1961 film by Don Taylor

- Theatrical release poster
- Directed by: Don Taylor
- Screenplay by: Benedict Freedman; John Fenton Murray
- Produced by: Allen Baron; Merrill S. Brody; Red Doff
- Starring: Mickey Rooney; Buddy Hackett; Jackie Cooper; Joanie Sommers; Roland Winters; Elizabeth MacRae
- Cinematography: Carl E. Guthrie
- Edited by: Richard K. Brockway
- Music by: Bernard Green
- Production company: Barbroo Productions
- Distributed by: Columbia Pictures
- Release date: December 20, 1961
- Running time: 80 minutes
- Country: United States
- Language: English

Everything's Ducky is a 1961 American comedy film directed by Don Taylor and written by Benedict Freedman and John Fenton Murray. The film stars Mickey Rooney, Buddy Hackett, Jackie Cooper, Joanie Sommers, Roland Winters and Elizabeth MacRae. It was released on December 20, 1961, by Columbia Pictures.

== Plot ==
Two sailors sneak a talking duck aboard their ship. Complications ensue. The duck waddles all over the ship until he escapes.

== Cast ==
- Mickey Rooney as Kermit 'Beetle' McKay
- Buddy Hackett as Seaman Admiral John Paul 'Ad' Jones
- Jackie Cooper as Lt. J.S. Parmell
- Joanie Sommers as Nina Lloyd
- Roland Winters as Capt. Lewis Bollinger
- Elizabeth MacRae as Susie Penrose
- Gene Blakely as Lt. Cmdr. Bernard Kemp
- Gordon Jones as Chief Petty Officer Conroy
- Richard Deacon as Dr. Deckham
- James Millhollin as George Imhoff
- Jimmy Cross as drunk
- Robert Williams as duck hunter
- King Calder as Frank
- Ellie Kent as nurse
- William Hellinger as corpsman
- Ann Morell as Wave
- George Sawaya as Simmons
- Dick Winslow as Fröehlich
- Alvy Moore as Jim Lipscott
- Walker Edmiston as Scuttlebutt – the duck

== Reception ==
Boxoffice wrote: "If the writers who concocted this humorless morsel of alleged comedy and Don Taylor, who directed their ridiculous scrivening, were undertaking to establish themselves as ranking magicians, they succeeded admirably – they turned a talking duck into a turkey. ... Mickey Rooney and Buddy Hackett have proved by countless past performances that they can be funny men. Herein they individually and collectively are hog-tied from scratch by amateurish script situations and dialog. ... Joanie Sommers, with some TV background, is the femme lead and introduces a pale ray of sunshine in an otherwise dull overcast. Producer Red Doff makes a limited budget cover a multitude of sins."

Variety wrote: "Director Don Taylor has done what he can to make capital of the lean material. There isn't much to work with."

The Monthly Film Bulletin wrote: "A sluggish attempt to make comedy capital out of the queasy idea of a talking duck. ... Mickey Rooney, cut down to size by being cast as straight feed to Buddy Hackett's roly-poly clown, is unexpectedly good. The comedy routines of both actors will possibly entertain children. Otherwise direction and general presentation are slipshod."
