= List of Bananas in Pyjamas episodes =

This is a list of episodes from the Australian children's television series Bananas in Pyjamas.

== Series overview ==
=== Original series ===
Series	Episodes	Originally released	
Series	Episodes	First released	Last released
1	40	20 July 1992	11 September 1992
2	30	22 March 1993	30 April 1993
3	30	26 September 1994	4 November 1994
4	100	5 August 1996	20 December 1996
5	20	22 November 1999	17 December 1999
6	80	27 August 2001	14 December 2001

=== Revived series ===
Series	Episodes	Originally released	
Series	Episodes	First released	Last released
1	52	2 May 2011	22 June 2011
2	52	7 May 2012	27 June 2012
3	52	24 December 2012	22 July 2013

== Original series (1992–2001) ==
=== Series 1 (1992) ===
1. Pink Mug (20 July 1992)
2. Picnic Thieves (21 July 1992)
3. Moon Rocket (22 July 1992)
4. Night Fright (23 July 1992)
5. Lost Shoe (24 July 1992)
6. Hide & Seek (27 July 1992)
7. Music Box (28 July 1992)
8. See-Saw (29 July 1992)
9. Buried Treasure (30 July 1992)
10. Grumpy Wumpy (31 July 1992)
11. Paper Chase (3 August 1992)
12. The Storm (4 August 1992)
13. Quick Grow (5 August 1992)
14. The Parcel (6 August 1992)
15. Wet Paint (7 August 1992)
16. The Robot (10 August 1992)
17. Happy Holiday (11 August 1992)
18. Decorating (12 August 1992)
19. It’s Raining (13 August 1992)
20. Doctor Bananas (14 August 1992)
21. Bananas’ Birthday Monday (17 August 1992)
22. Bananas’ Birthday Tuesday (18 August 1992)
23. Bananas’ Birthday Wednesday (19 August 1992)
24. Bananas’ Birthday Thursday (20 August 1992)
25. Bananas’ Birthday Friday (21 August 1992)
26. The Spider (24 August 1992)
27. Amy’s Castle (25 August 1992)
28. Show Business (26 August 1992)
29. Getting Rhythm (27 August 1992)
30. Musical Stairs (28 August 1992)
31. Swamp Lake (31 August 1992)
32. Take One (1 September 1992)
33. Video Clip (2 September 1992)
34. Cuddles Avenue (3 September 1992)
35. Fancy Dress (4 September 1992)
36. Chasing Rainbows (7 September 1992)
37. Something Fishy (8 September 1992)
38. Lulu’s Magic (9 September 1992)
39. Obstacle Race (10 September 1992)
40. Ready, Steady, Go! (11 September 1992)

=== Series 2 (1992) – Aired 1993 ===
41. Wibbly Wobbly (22 March 1993)
42. Atchoo! (23 March 1993)
43. Ratmobile (24 March 1993)
44. Cafe Rat (25 March 1993)
45. Boo! (26 March 1993)
46. Fair Game (29 March 1993)
47. Magic Carpet (30 March 1993)
48. Stone Soup (31 March 1993)
49. Housesitter (1 April 1993)
50. Morgan's Cubby (2 April 1993)
51. Monster Bananas (5 April 1993)
52. Strictly Bananas (6 April 1993)
53. Goldilocks Bananas (7 April 1993)
54. Banana Magic (8 April 1993)
55. Slipper Fairies (9 April 1993)
56. Painted Bananas (12 April 1993)
57. Lost Voice (13 April 1993)
58. Banana Shop (14 April 1993)
59. Sun Hats (15 April 1993)
60. Wash Day (16 April 1993)
61. Banana Hiccups (19 April 1993)
62. Dream Time (20 April 1993)
63. Wishing Pool (21 April 1993)
64. Bananasaurus (22 April 1993)
65. Bed Time (23 April 1993)
66. Forbidden Fruit (26 April 1993)
67. Shadow Painting (27 April 1993)
68. Chasing Tuesdays (28 April 1993)
69. Shop Shut (29 April 1993)
70. Mirror Mirror (30 April 1993)

=== Series 3 (1994) ===
71. Pyjama Party (26 September 1994)
72. Pink Spots (27 September 1994)
73. Snow Storm (28 September 1994)
74. Scarecrow (29 September 1994)
75. Treasure Hunt (30 September 1994)
76. Broken Truck (3 October 1994)
77. Say Cheese (4 October 1994)
78. Car Polish (5 October 1994)
79. King Rat (6 October 1994)
80. Dancing Shoes (7 October 1994)
81. Circus Time (10 October 1994)
82. Shiny Things (11 October 1994)
83. Rat Wash (12 October 1994)
84. Fire! Fire! (13 October 1994)
85. Super Bananas (14 October 1994)
86. Special Delivery (17 October 1994)
87. Model Bananas (18 October 1994)
88. Big Parade (19 October 1994)
89. Rat Post (20 October 1994)
90. Whale Snail (21 October 1994)
91. Spring Clean (24 October 1994)
92. Play Time (25 October 1994)
93. Pony Ride (26 October 1994)
94. Gallery Rat (27 October 1994)
95. Salon Rat (28 October 1994)
96. Sand Palace (31 October 1994)
97. Magic Lamp (1 November 1994)
98. Rat's Hat (2 November 1994)
99. Surf's Up (3 November 1994)
100. Help! Help! (4 November 1994)

=== Series 4 (1996) ===
101. Banana News (5 August 1996)
102. Tuesday Disguise (6 August 1996)
103. Amy's Trombone (7 August 1996)
104. Holiday Time (8 August 1996)
105. Knitting Bananas (9 August 1996)
106. Topsy Turvey (12 August 1996)
107. Lucky Day (13 August 1996)
108. Weather Rat (14 August 1996)
109. Moving Bananas (15 August 1996)
110. Where's Lulu? (16 August 1996)
111. Magic Sack (19 August 1996)
112. Rat's Zoo (20 August 1996)
113. New Tent (21 August 1996)
114. Sleeping Teddy (22 August 1996)
115. Oops! (23 August 1996)
116. Busker Bananas (26 August 1996)
117. Special Treasures (27 August 1996)
118. Surprise Disguise (28 August 1996)
119. Rat Clean (29 August 1996)
120. Banana Rescue (30 August 1996)
121. Singing Bananas (2 September 1996)
122. Dirty Rat (3 September 1996)
123. Puppy Love (4 September 1996)
124. Crab Catchers (5 September 1996)
125. Joy Flight (6 September 1996)
126. Seeing Double (9 September 1996)
127. Talking Trees (10 September 1996)
128. Sniffles (11 September 1996)
129. Space Bananas (12 September 1996)
130. Golden Eggs (13 September 1996)
131. Banana Day (16 September 1996)
132. Dinner Party (17 September 1996)
133. Washing Line (18 September 1996)
134. Vanishing Vegetables (19 September 1996)
135. Ship Ahoy! (20 September 1996)
136. Tall Morgan (23 September 1996)
137. Springtime Party (24 September 1996)
138. Gobbledy Gook (25 September 1996)
139. Wrong Side (26 September 1996)
140. Pretty Maggie (27 September 1996)
141. Mermaid Teardrops (30 September 1996)
142. Street Fixers (1 October 1996)
143. Tangly Trick (2 October 1996)
144. Walkie Talkie (3 October 1996)
145. Statues (4 October 1996)
146. Banana Cart (7 October 1996)
147. Lulu's Tutu (8 October 1996)
148. Rain Dance (9 October 1996)
149. Work Shed (10 October 1996)
150. Invisible Bananas (11 October 1996)
151. Teddy Chase (14 October 1996)
152. Stripes (15 October 1996)
153. Magic Pumpkin (16 October 1996)
154. Banana Plumbers (17 October 1996)
155. Home Delivery (18 October 1996)
156. Sea Surprise (21 October 1996)
157. Taxi Rat (22 October 1996)
158. Billy Cart (23 October 1996)
159. Lost Recipe (24 October 1996)
160. Rat Suits (25 October 1996)
161. Odd Jobs (28 October 1996)
162. Self Serve (29 October 1996)
163. Ribbon Hunt (30 October 1996)
164. Lost Tortoise (31 October 1996)
165. Rescue Practice (1 November 1996)
166. Rat Race (4 November 1996)
167. Tall Story (5 November 1996)
168. Purple Pencil (6 November 1996)
169. Strange Signs (7 November 1996)
170. Car Sale (8 November 1996)
171. Sand Festival (11 November 1996)
172. Switcheroo (12 November 1996)
173. Noisy Night (13 November 1996)
174. B3 (14 November 1996)
175. Rat's Tale (15 November 1996)
176. Morgan's Story (18 November 1996)
177. Magic Hat (19 November 1996)
178. Beauty Rat (20 November 1996)
179. Mixed Up Time (21 November 1996)
180. Cinder Rat (22 November 1996)
181. Farmer Rat (25 November 1996)
182. Butterflies (26 November 1996)
183. Do-it-Yourself (27 November 1996)
184. Lullaby (28 November 1996)
185. Twinkle Twinkle (29 November 1996)
186. Jingly Jangly (2 December 1996)
187. Adventure Amy (3 December 1996)
188. Paw Prints (4 December 1996)
189. Cuckoo Clock (5 December 1996)
190. Green Paws (6 December 1996)
191. House Guests (9 December 1996)
192. Birthday Surprise (10 December 1996)
193. Juggling Bananas (11 December 1996)
194. Shoe Shine (12 December 1996)
195. Teddy Puppets (13 December 1996)
196. Yee Hah! (16 December 1996)
197. Silly Strawberry (17 December 1996)
198. Odd Socks (18 December 1996)
199. Lollipop Rat (19 December 1996)
200. Imaginary Holiday (20 December 1996)

=== Series 5 (1999) ===
201. Story Time (22 November 1999)
202. Rat Hotel (23 November 1999)
203. Rock-a-Bye Bananas (24 November 1999)
204. Shipwrecked Bananas (25 November 1999)
205. Cock-a-Doodle (26 November 1999)
206. Radio Bananas (29 November 1999)
207. Bananas Without Pyjamas (30 November 1999)
208. The Flag (1 December 1999)
209. Hat Trouble (2 December 1999)
210. Home Time Rat (3 December 1999)
211. Magic Tolstoy (6 December 1999)
212. Tortoise Wedding (7 December 1999)
213. Banana Breakfast (8 December 1999)
214. Sneezing Time (9 December 1999)
215. Stepping on Cracks (10 December 1999)
216. Stuck Inside (13 December 1999)
217. Bedtime Bunyip (14 December 1999)
218. Speedy Bananas (15 December 1999)
219. Home Video (16 December 1999)
220. Lulu's Yo-Yo (17 December 1999)

=== Series 6 (2001) ===
221. All Aboard! (27 August 2001)
222. Morgan's Photo (28 August 2001)
223. Perfect Fit (29 August 2001)
224. Lost Key (30 August 2001)
225. Copycat Bananas (31 August 2001)
226. Footprints (3 September 2001)
227. Star Bananas (4 September 2001)
228. Hide and Sleep (5 September 2001)
229. Lost and Found (6 September 2001)
230. Busy Day (7 September 2001)
231. Fool's Gold (10 September 2001)
232. Waiter Bananas (11 September 2001)
233. Big Cheese (12 September 2001)
234. Teddy Friends (13 September 2001)
235. Atchoo Birds (14 September 2001)
236. 3-Legged Bananas (17 September 2001)
237. Morgan's Mail (18 September 2001)
238. Fixit Rat (19 September 2001)
239. Giant Opera (20 September 2001)
240. Yippy Chippy (21 September 2001)
241. Desert Island (24 September 2001)
242. News Flash (25 September 2001)
243. Crowded House (26 September 2001)
244. Super Sale (27 September 2001)
245. Happy Camper (28 September 2001)
246. Wonderful Cake (1 October 2001)
247. Rat's World (2 October 2001)
248. Lulu's Doovers (3 October 2001)
249. Amy's News (4 October 2001)
250. Full Load (5 October 2001)
251. Garden Gnomes (8 October 2001)
252. Street Stalls (9 October 2001)
253. Drip Splosh (10 October 2001)
254. Perfect Present (11 October 2001)
255. Ticklish Problem (12 October 2001)
256. Guessing Game (15 October 2001)
257. Beat Box (16 October 2001)
258. Horse and Cart (17 October 2001)
259. Night Visitors (18 October 2001)
260. Backstage Bananas (19 October 2001)
261. Next, Please (22 October 2001)
262. Princess Lulu (23 October 2001)
263. Rescue Rumba (24 October 2001)
264. Flash the Fish (25 October 2001)
265. Walk the Fish (26 October 2001)
266. Too Many Tomatoes (29 October 2001)
267. Quiz Show (30 October 2001)
268. Pump Pumpkin (31 October 2001)
269. Picnic Friends (1 November 2001)
270. Ring, Ring (2 November 2001)
271. Cold Sheep (5 November 2001)
272. Winged Heels (6 November 2001)
273. Egg Collector (7 November 2001)
274. Scaresheep (8 November 2001)
275. Farm Fresh (9 November 2001)
276. No Speaking Day (12 November 2001)
277. Animal Hospital (13 November 2001)
278. Barnyard Choir (14 November 2001)
279. Farm Show (15 November 2001)
280. Pig's Company (16 November 2001)
281. Jungle Amy (19 November 2001)
282. Cold Comfort (20 November 2001)
283. Everybody Welcome! (21 November 2001)
284. Nighty Day (22 November 2001)
285. Rat's Farm (23 November 2001)
286. Cheese Trees (26 November 2001)
287. Farm Adventure (27 November 2001)
288. Hungry Harvest (28 November 2001)
289. Cut-Out Bananas (29 November 2001)
290. Mooving Cow (30 November 2001)
291. Tortoise Trek (3 December 2001)
292. Bed Rest (4 December 2001)
293. Handy Bananas (5 December 2001)
294. Mayor Rat (6 December 2001)
295. Sheepdog Bananas (7 December 2001)
296. Sir Knight Rat (10 December 2001)
297. Dancing Daze (11 December 2001)
298. Noisy Cow (12 December 2001)
299. Big Clean Up (13 December 2001)
300. 2-Wheeler Bananas (14 December 2001)

=== Specials ===
1. Wish Fairies (11 December 1995)
2. Singing Time (23 December 1996)
3. Bumping-and-a-Jumping (18 December 1997)
4. Surprise Party (18 October 1999)

== Revived series (2011–13) ==
=== CGI Series 1 (2011) ===
No. overall	No. in series	Title	Original release date
1	1	"The Magic Trick"	2 May 2011
2	2	"Moving"	3 May 2011
3	3	"The Little Fish"	4 May 2011
4	4	"Glue"	5 May 2011
5	5	"Prince Rat"	6 May 2011
6	6	"Fluffy Bunny"	7 May 2011
7	7	"The Billy Cart Race"	8 May 2011
8	8	"Bird Song"	9 May 2011
9	9	"The Nursing Bananas"	10 May 2011
10	10	"The Collection"	11 May 2011
11	11	"Gold Rush"	12 May 2011
12	12	"A Very Special Jelly"	13 May 2011
13	13	"The Bushwalk"	14 May 2011
14	14	"The Genie Bananas"	15 May 2011
15	15	"The New Bike"	16 May 2011
16	16	"The Gardening Bananas"	17 May 2011
17	17	"Pink Pyjamas"	18 May 2011
18	18	"The Camera"	19 May 2011
19	19	"Rat's Superstore"	20 May 2011
20	20	"The Bernard Mystery"	21 May 2011
21	21	"Talent Quest"	22 May 2011
22	22	"Mystery Noise"	23 May 2011
23	23	"Treasure Hunt"	24 May 2011
24	24	"Rat's Retreat"	25 May 2011
25	25	"The Flowers"	26 May 2011
26	26	"The Fix-it Bananas"	27 May 2011
27	27	"A Wonderful Day"	28 May 2011
28	28	"The Sleepy Snitcher"	29 May 2011
29	29	"The Delivery Bananas"	30 May 2011
30	30	"Morgan's Cloud"	31 May 2011
31	31	"Old Porridge"	1 June 2011
32	32	"Bernard's Party"	2 June 2011
33	33	"Morgan's Smelly Sneakers"	3 June 2011
34	34	"The Trickisaurus"	4 June 2011
35	35	"The Little Birds"	5 June 2011
36	36	"The Holiday"	6 June 2011
37	37	"The Art Show"	7 June 2011
38	38	"The Ducklings"	8 June 2011
39	39	"Go Robot"	9 June 2011
40	40	"The Pie"	10 June 2011
41	41	"The Dragon"	11 June 2011
42	42	"The Surprise"	12 June 2011
43	43	"Amy's Package"	13 June 2011
44	44	"Bubbles"	14 June 2011
45	45	"Morgan's Cafe"	15 June 2011
46	46	"Rat the Banana"	16 June 2011
47	47	"Shoo! Scram!"	17 June 2011
48	48	"The Birthdays"	18 June 2011
49	49	"The Perfect Spot"	19 June 2011
50	50	"Banana Phones"	20 June 2011
51	51	"The Banana Truck"	21 June 2011
52	52	"Cuddlestown Records"	22 June 2011

=== CGI Series 2 (2012) ===
No. overall	No. in series	Title	Original release date
53	1	"Bananas to the Rescue"	7 May 2012
54	2	"Rainbows"	8 May 2012
55	3	"Banana Day"	9 May 2012
56	4	"Saving Skid"	10 May 2012
57	5	"The Missing Muffins"	11 May 2012
58	6	"Rat News"	12 May 2012
59	7	"Fishy Business"	13 May 2012
60	8	"The Camping Trip"	14 May 2012
61	9	"The Hopping Bananas"	15 May 2012
62	10	"World Tour"	16 May 2012
63	11	"The Big Trick"	17 May 2012
64	12	"The Music Box"	18 May 2012
65	13	"The Jelly Planet"	19 May 2012
66	14	"Rat's Movie Night"	20 May 2012
67	15	"Bad Luck Morgan"	21 May 2012
68	16	"The Waterhole"	22 May 2012
69	17	"The Jam Judge"	23 May 2012
70	18	"The Prince of Cheese"	24 May 2012
71	19	"Click Clack"	25 May 2012
72	20	"Beach Carnival"	26 May 2012
73	21	"Games"	27 May 2012
74	22	"Halloween"	28 May 2012
75	23	"The Talking Bird"	29 May 2012
76	24	"The Cuddlestown Band"	30 May 2012
77	25	"Super Bear"	31 May 2012
78	26	"The Snowman"	1 June 2012
79	27	"The Surf Off"	2 June 2012
80	28	"Over the Moon"	3 June 2012
81	29	"The Sneaky Shadows"	4 June 2012
82	30	"Jobs Galore"	5 June 2012
83	31	"Topsylocks"	6 June 2012
84	32	"Mayor Rat"	7 June 2012
85	33	"Muckle Bird Madness"	8 June 2012
86	34	"The Soap"	9 June 2012
87	35	"Pedro's Cousin"	10 June 2012
88	36	"Rat's Wishing Well"	11 June 2012
89	37	"The Butterflies"	12 June 2012
90	38	"Rat's New Shop"	13 June 2012
91	39	"Turtle Trouble"	14 June 2012
92	40	"The Housesitters"	15 June 2012
93	41	"The Beach Shack"	16 June 2012
94	42	"The Toys"	17 June 2012
95	43	"Tall Morgan"	18 June 2012
96	44	"We Love Cuddlestown"	19 June 2012
97	45	"Traffic Monitors"	20 June 2012
98	46	"Power Cut"	21 June 2012
99	47	"The Challenge"	22 June 2012
100	48	"A Table For Topsy"	23 June 2012
101	49	"The Runaway Bear"	24 June 2012
102	50	"Rat The Gardener"	25 June 2012
103	51	"Rat's Fun World"	26 June 2012
104	52	"The Elephant"	27 June 2012

=== CGI Series 3 (2012–13) ===
No. overall	No. in series	Title	Original release date
105	1	"The Rainmakers"	13 May 2013
106	2	"The Snippys Are Coming"	14 May 2013
107	3	"Morgan the Bear"	15 May 2013
108	4	"Golfing Rat"	16 May 2013
109	5	"The Missing Page"	17 May 2013
110	6	"Rat the Clown"	20 May 2013
111	7	"Mrs Rat Takes Over"	21 May 2013
112	8	"The Christmas Tree"	24 December 2012
113	9	"Holes Galore"	22 May 2013
114	10	"Rat's New Hat"	23 May 2013
115	11	"Cuddlestown's Big Thing"	24 May 2013
116	12	"Morgan the Magnificent"	27 May 2013
117	13	"The Cushion"	28 May 2013
118	14	"The Babysitting Bananas"	29 May 2013
119	15	"The Honking Bananas"	30 May 2013
120	16	"Pedro's New Mud"	31 May 2013
121	17	"The Ping Pong Hiccups"	3 June 2013
122	18	"Charlie's Holiday"	4 June 2013
123	19	"Rat and the Jelly"	5 June 2013
124	20	"The Dragons Egg"	6 June 2013
125	21	"The Big Cheese"	7 June 2013
126	22	"The Floating Bananas"	10 June 2013
127	23	"The Inventing Bananas"	11 June 2013
128	24	"Promises"	12 June 2013
129	25	"The Play Zone"	13 June 2013
130	26	"The Shell"	14 June 2013
131	27	"Super Job Morgan"	17 June 2013
132	28	"The Submarine"	18 June 2013
133	29	"The Secret Ingredient"	19 June 2013
134	30	"The Banana Buggy"	20 June 2013
135	31	"Grumpy Rat"	21 June 2013
136	32	"The Naughty Puppy"	24 June 2013
137	33	"Rat the Explorer"	25 June 2013
138	34	"The Spaceship"	26 June 2013
139	35	"The Song"	27 June 2013
140	36	"The Jelly Bub"	28 June 2013
141	37	"Topsy's Favourite Friend"	1 July 2013
142	38	"The Forgetful Bananas"	2 July 2013
143	39	"Best Friends Forever"	3 July 2013
144	40	"Rat's Shop"	4 July 2013
145	41	"The Gardening Bananas"	5 July 2013
146	42	"The Fast Bananas"	8 July 2013
147	43	"The Smelly Cheese"	9 July 2013
148	44	"A Bunch of Bananas"	10 July 2013
149	45	"The Banana Dance"	11 July 2013
150	46	"The Pen Pal"	12 July 2013
151	47	"Opposite"	15 July 2013
152	48	"Rat the Artist"	16 July 2013
153	49	"The Wolves"	17 July 2013
154	50	"The Greedy Rat"	18 July 2013
155	51	"The Big Jump"	19 July 2013
156	52	"Morgan's New Friend"	22 July 2013
