= Elizabeth MacRae =

American actress (1936–2024)

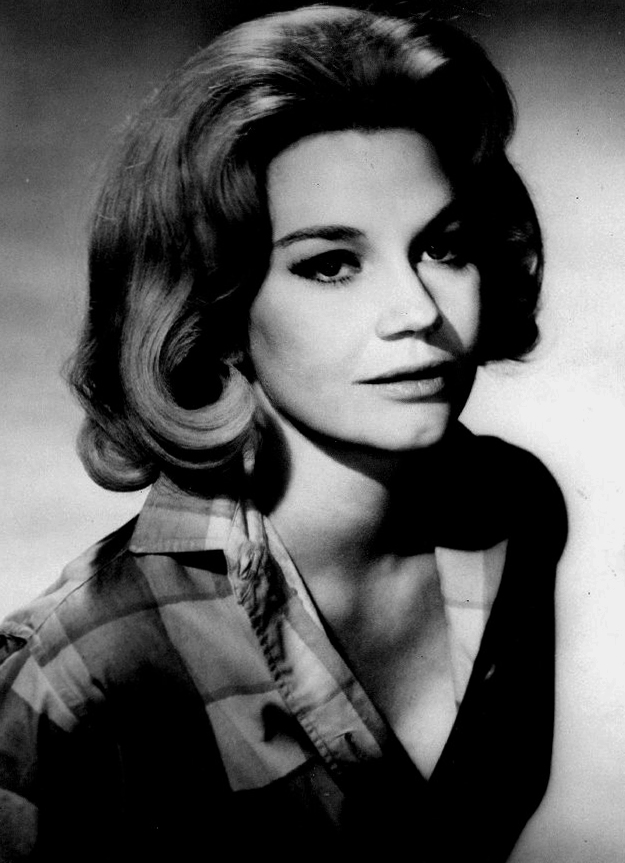
- MacRae in 1967
- Born: Elizabeth Hendon MacRae; February 22, 1936; Columbia, South Carolina, U.S.
- Died: May 27, 2024 (aged 88); Fayetteville, North Carolina, U.S.
- Years active: 1958–2011
- Spouses: Amos Morehead Stack, Jr. (m. 1955; div. 19??); Nedrick Young (m. 1965; died 1968) Charles Day Halsey, Jr. (m. 1969)

Elizabeth Hendon MacRae (February 22, 1936 – May 27, 2024) was an American actress who performed in dozens of television series and in nine feature films, working predominantly in productions released between 1958 and the late 1980s. Among her more widely recognized roles was her recurring character Lou-Ann Poovie on the sitcom Gomer Pyle, U.S.M.C., which was originally broadcast from 1964 to 1969.

== Early life and drama training ==
Born in Columbia, South Carolina, in 1936, Elizabeth MacRae was the middle child of three children of Alabama native Dorothy (née Hendon) and James C. MacRae of North Carolina. Her father, an attorney, moved the family before April 1940 to Fayetteville, North Carolina, where he opened a law practice and later served as a superior court judge. Growing up in Fayetteville, Elizabeth received her primary education there, and her parents sent her to Washington, D.C. to finish her secondary education at Holton-Arms, an independent college-preparatory school for girls.

Following her graduation from Holton-Arms, MacRae decided to pursue an acting career and in 1956 traveled to Atlanta, Georgia to audition for a part in director Otto Preminger's production Saint Joan. She failed to be cast in the film, but in a 1959 newspaper interview with syndicated Hollywood columnist Joe Hyams, MacRae credited Preminger for encouraging her not to abandon her career plans and instead to seek intensive, professional performance training. "'Mr. Preminger'", she recounted to Hyams, "'told me then to keep in touch with him and advised me to go to New York and study because I had intuitive talent'". Heeding Preminger's advice, MacRae in October 1956 moved to New York City, where for two years she studied with Uta Hagen at the Herbert Berghof Studio and gained stage experience playing assorted characters in off-Broadway and summer-stock productions. She also resumed her artistic training, attending classes on drawing and painting at the Art Students League in Manhattan.

=== "Actress and artist" ===
During her childhood and throughout her teenage years, MacRae was encouraged by her mother to develop and refine her artistic talents, especially in drawing and painting portraits. Later, when she was in New York studying acting, the aspiring stage performer supported herself with money she earned through commissions for her artwork. Earl Wilson, another syndicated newspaper columnist, recounted in a 1958 article that MacRae "started drawing because my older brother did. I always did everything he did...", taking lessons from childhood through to adulthood. She started making money after doing some portraits for a local church bazaar, which led to overwhelming demand from people who "commissioned me to draw their children", supporting herself through her acting classes and the early days of her career.

== Television ==
By the latter half of 1958, MacRae was in Los Angeles, California and auditioning again for a film role as well as in television productions. There she also continued her studies in theatre at the California Institute of the Arts and resumed her training in drawing and painting by attending classes at the Otis College of Art and Design. She tested again with Otto Preminger for the role of Mary Pilant in the crime film Anatomy of a Murder (1959). Kathryn Grant was chosen for that part by Preminger; but, as noted by newspaper columnist Earl Wilson, MacRae soon was cast in her first television role, playing a witness in the courtroom series The Verdict Is Yours. Over the next several years, MacRae began to perform increasingly in more substantive, credited roles in televised dramas and sitcoms, ultimately appearing in a wide variety of popular weekly series, most of which are productions from the 1960s and 1970s. Some of the programs from that period include 77 Sunset Strip; Hawaiian Eye; Surfside 6; Harrigan and Son; Burke's Law; Dr. Kildare; The Andy Griffith Show; The Untouchables; Death Valley Days; Rawhide; General Hospital; Gunsmoke (in a short recurring role as "April"); The Fugitive; Gomer Pyle, U.S.M.C.; I Dream of Jeannie; The Virginian; Rhoda; Barnaby Jones; Kojak; Mannix; and Petrocelli.

MacRae continued to perform on television through the 1980s, but by then in parts almost exclusively on other daytime soap operas, such as All My Children (1980), Guiding Light (1983), and Another World (1980, 1989).

=== Multiple appearances on series ===
During MacRae's many years working on television, there are six series in which she performed in three or more episodes. She was cast as different characters in four episodes of the adventure crime drama Route 66 and in three episodes of Surfside 6, another crime drama about a Miami-based detective agency.

MacRae was also cast multiple times on the long-running Gunsmoke, appearing once in the role of Fanny in the 1962 episode "Half-Straight" and then, between 1962 and 1965, appearing four times as April, the girlfriend of Festus Haggen, one of the series' main characters. MacRae performed too in numerous installments of two daytime soap operas: as two characters–Barbara Randolph and Phyllis Anderson–over 13 episodes of Days of Our Lives in 1976 and 1977 and as Jozie in 11 episodes on Search for Tomorrow in 1985. In her television career, however, MacRae gained her widest recognition among audiences for her performances as a recurring character on the 1960s sitcom Gomer Pyle, U.S.M.C.

==== Gomer Pyle, U.S.M.C ====
From 1966 to 1969, MacRae was repeatedly cast on the sitcom Gomer Pyle, U.S.M.C in the role of Lou-Ann Poovie, the girlfriend of the series' title character. Her first of 15 appearances on that show is in the 1966 episode "Love's Old Sweet Song". Hal Humphrey, a reporter for the Los Angeles Times, featured MacRae in his 1968 article about Gomer Pyle, U.S.M.C in which he explained that she was hired to play a very lousy singer for just one episode, cast because she was indeed a bad singer, and because of her true-bred Southern accent. The characters – and MacRae and actor Jim Nabors – got along so well onscreen, "it was decided to make her [Gomer's] more or less permanent girlfriend".

== Films ==
Although the great majority of MacRae's acting work was on television, she was also cast in nine feature films. Her earliest credited screen role is in the comedy Love in a Goldfish Bowl, released by Paramount Pictures in the summer of 1961 and co-starring Tommy Sands and Fabian. MacRae later that year performed as a supporting character in Everything's Ducky, a screenplay about a talking duck produced by Columbia Pictures and starring Mickey Rooney. Described in 1961 by Los Angeles Times critic Geoffrey Warren as a "nonsense comedy", MacRae plays Susie Penrose. Then, from 1962 through 1964, while her television career continued to develop, MacRae acted in four more Hollywood films: The Wild Westerners, Wild Is My Love, For Love or Money, and in the live-action animated comedy The Incredible Mr. Limpet. In the latter film, starring Don Knotts, she provided the voice of the character Ladyfish.

After MacRae's voice work for The Incredible Mr. Limpet, a decade passed before she performed in another film, the mystery thriller The Conversation, released in April 1974. The production, directed by Francis Ford Coppola and starring Gene Hackman, proved to be the most critically acclaimed picture of her career. It won the prestigious Palme d'Or at the 1974 Cannes Film Festival, received two British Academy Film Awards, and was nominated for three Academy Awards. MacRae's association with The Conversation in her role as Meredith drew considerable attention to the veteran actress from moviegoers and critics, partly because the role required her to remove all of her clothing in a shadowed long shot. Film stills of her scenes with Hackman are featured prominently in 1974 previews and in other contemporary coverage of the drama by The Washington Post, the Chicago Tribune, and other major American newspapers. In a 2002 newspaper interview for The Fayetteville Observer, MacRae reflected on her involvement in the award-winning production. She described Coppola as an "intense" director and one who was "kind and open to actors' building their characters". She also shared her experiences traveling to France to attend the ceremonies in Cannes, where she and other members of the cast were being "treated like royalty".

Following her performance in The Conversation, MacRae continued to work predominantly in television, while she was cast in only two more feature films over the next fifteen years. She portrays Mrs. Lumquist in the 1978 horror film The House of the Dead and a news reporter in the 1989 production Eddie and the Cruisers II: Eddie Lives!.

== Archives ==
In 1999 and 2002, MacRae donated assorted records relating to her acting career to the University of North Carolina at Chapel Hill. These items are preserved on campus in the Southern Historical Collection at the Louis Round Wilson Library and include letters, scrapbooks with newspaper and magazine clippings, photographs, audio and videotapes, as well as her working scripts from various films, television series, and stage productions in which she performed.

== Personal life ==
On August 12, 1955, MacRae married Amos Morehead Stack, Jr., the son of a prominent North Carolina judge, in Fayetteville, N.C. The duration of their marriage and the circumstances of its dissolution are undetermined by available official records. She married for the second time in 1965, then to Hollywood actor and screenwriter Nedrick Young. The couple remained together until 54-year-old Young died of a "heart ailment" just three years later. The following year, in 1969, MacRae wed Wells Fargo executive Charles Day Halsey, Jr. in Palm Springs, California.

=== Return to North Carolina and the stage ===
During the 1990s, MacRae devoted much of her time to what she described as her "second career", providing support and counseling individuals suffering from alcohol and drug abuse. Then, in 1998, she and her husband Charles retired and moved to western North Carolina, where they settled initially in the town of Cashiers. MacRae still remained involved in various organizations, sharing her acting knowledge and experiences working in stage, television, and film productions. In November 2000, for example, she was a guest panelist at the Asheville Film Festival (now the Western North Carolina Film Festival) in Asheville, North Carolina, appearing with fellow professional actors Julie Parrish, Pat Priest, Pamela Sue Martin, Rhodes Reason, and Soupy Sales. She also appeared periodically at other special events and in televised programs, such as in the CMT: The Greatest – 20 Greatest Country Comedy Shows, which was hosted by actor John Schneider and originally broadcast on Country Music Television on May 27, 2006.

=== Later life and death ===
The couple moved again in August 2001, moving east in North Carolina to Elizabeth's childhood neighborhood of Haymount in Fayetteville. In March 2002, MacRae co-starred in a stage production of Picnic at the local Cape Fear Regional Theatre. Her performances in that play as the schoolteacher Rosemary marked the first time in nearly four decades that MacRae had performed in live theatre.

After living in Fayetteville for several years, MacRae and her husband moved to the town of Glenville, North Carolina, where they remained. MacRae was also inducted into the Fayetteville Hall of Fame, in 2023. She died in Fayetteville on May 27, 2024, at the age of 88.

== Filmography ==
=== Film appearances ===
- Love in a Goldfish Bowl (1961) as Jackie
- Everything's Ducky (1961) as Susie Penrose
- The Wild Westerners (1962) as Crystal Plummer
- Wild is My Love (1963) as Queenie
- For Love or Money (1963) as Marsha
- The Incredible Mr. Limpet (1964) (voice) as Ladyfish
- The Conversation (1974) as Meredith
- Alien Zone (1978) as Mrs. Lumquist
- Eddie and the Cruisers II: Eddie Lives! (1989) as Reporter #3

=== Television appearances ===
- The Verdict Is Yours (1958) as Courtroom Witness
- Naked City (1960)
- Harrigan and Son (1961) as Cynthia
- Maverick (1961) as Emily Todd
- The Asphalt Jungle (1961)
- Surfside 6 (1961, 1962) as Carla Wilson/Marcy Johnson/Margia Knight/Carla Wilson
- 77 Sunset Strip (1962) as Bette Otterman
- Dr. Kildare (1962) as Carrie Palmer RN
- Hawaiian Eye (1962) as Tina Billings
- The Untouchables (1962) as Jean Colton aka Bunny
- Gunsmoke (1962, 1962–1965) as Fanny Fields (1962), April Clomley (recurring)
- Sam Benedict (1963) as Mrs. Jerome
- Stoney Burke (1963) as Paula
- Death Valley Days (1963) as Myra Engles
- For Love or Money (1963) as Marsha
- Burke's Law (1964) as Marcy
- Route 66 (1960, 1962, 1964) as Randy Spring/Betsy/Jean/Betty
- Rawhide (1964) as Sally Ann Rankin
- The Fugitive (1964) as Clara Braydon
- The Virginian (1965) as Molly Weams
- I Dream of Jeannie (1965) as Diane
- The Andy Griffith Show (1967) as Betty Parker
- Bonanza (1968) as Lila Holden
- Gomer Pyle, U.S.M.C. (1966–1969) as Lou-Ann Poovie (recurring)
- Judd for the Defense (1969) as Helen Barrett
- General Hospital (1969–1970; 1972–1973), as Meg Bentley #2
- Mannix (1972)
- Petrocelli (1975) as Lucille Bates
- Kojak (1975) as Betsy Vellon
- Barnaby Jones (1976) as Lucy Thornburgh
- Rhoda (1977) as Adele
- Days of Our Lives (1977) as Barbara Randolph
- Guiding Light (1983–1984) as Agatha Dobson
- Search for Tomorrow (1985) as Josie
- Another World (1988) as Aunt Rose

=== Other appearances ===
- CMT: The Greatest - 20 Greatest Country Comedy Shows (2006) (TV) as Herself
