= Burr DeBenning =

American actor (1936–2003)

- DeBenning in 1977
- Born: Burris Franklin DeBenning; September 21, 1936; Seminole, Oklahoma, U.S.
- Died: May 26, 2003 (aged 66); San Luis Obispo, California, U.S.
- Other names: Burr De Benning, DeBenning
- Education: Oklahoma State University; New York University
- Occupation: Actor
- Years active: 1965–1992
- Spouse: Susan Silo
- Children: 2
- Relatives: Jon Silo (father-in-law); Ruth Silo (mother-in-law)

Burris Franklin DeBenning (September 21, 1936 – May 26, 2003) was an American character actor who worked in both film and television.

== Early years ==
The son of Mr. and Mrs. M.J. DeBenning, he was born in Seminole, Oklahoma, and grew up in Stillwater. He enrolled at Oklahoma State University as a business major, but he switched to drama midway through his second year and went on to have major roles in several plays at OSU. After serving in the United States Air Force, he went to New York University and earned a master's degree in drama.

== Career ==
DeBenning first acted professionally in an off-Broadway play that lasted four days. He next joined a professional troupe in Boston.

DeBenning appeared in nearly 100 films and TV shows including the television films The House on Greenapple Road (1970), Brinks: The Great Robbery (1976) and Hanging by a Thread (1979). He appeared in such television programs as CHiPs; Custer; Nakia; Matlock; Matt Houston; Mike Hammer; Magnum, P.I.; The Rockford Files; Kojak; The Streets of San Francisco; Hawaii Five-O; Matt Helm; Medical Center; McCloud; Ironside; Columbo and Medical Story. In 1969, DeBenning appeared as Orrey Hills on the TV series The Virginian in the episode titled "Journey to Scathelock". He also co-starred with Robert Wagner in City Beneath the Sea (1971).

His film appearances included a memorable turn as a comic prone Marine in Beach Red (1967), Sweet November (1968), St. Ives (1976), The Incredible Melting Man (1977), Armed Response (1986), A Nightmare on Elm Street 5: The Dream Child (1989), and Love Field (1992). He played Lt. Jim Porter, a Navy Intelligence agent, in the 1978 science fiction TV miniseries, The Return of Captain Nemo, originally shown on U.S. TV as a three part miniseries (50-minutes each episode) and later released theatrically outside the U.S. in a 102-minute widescreen version renamed The Amazing Captain Nemo. From 1981 to 1982, he played evil town boss Paul Garrett (and later his equally evil twin brother, Richard Garrett) in the TV series Father Murphy.

== Personal life ==
DeBenning was married to actress Susan Silo and had two children.

== Death ==
DeBenning died in San Luis Obispo, California at age 66 from undisclosed causes.

== Filmography ==
Year	Title	Role	Notes
1967	Beach Red	Egan	
1968	Sweet November	Clem Batchman	
1968	The Virginian	Jason Crowder	Episode: "The Storm Gate"
1969	The Virginian	Orrey Hills	Episode: "Journey to Scathelock"
1970	Bonanza	Tuttle Ames	Episode: "Is there any man here...?"
1970	House on Greenapple Road	Bill Foley	TV movie
1971	City Beneath the Sea	Dr Aguila	
1972	J.C.	Dan Martin	
1974	Columbo	Capt. Loomis	Episode: "By Dawn's Early Light"
1974	Kojak	Cass	Episode: "A Very Deadly Game"
1974	The Streets of San Francisco	Johnny Waco	Episode: "License to Kill"
1975	Adventures of the Queen		
1976	St. Ives	Officer Fran	
1977	Little House on the Prairie	Dr. Asa Logan	Episode: "To Run and Hide"
1977	The New Adventures of Wonder Woman	Tom Baker	Episode: "Knockout"
1977	The Incredible Melting Man	Dr. Ted Nelson	
1978	The Return of Captain Nemo	Jim Porter	
1978	The House of the Dead	Growski	Also known as Alien Zone
1978	Hawaii Five-O	Roy Crawford	Episode: "A Long Time Ago"
1979	Hart to Hart	Lieutenant Ed Taggert	Episode: "Cop Out"
1980	Cruising		
1981	Wolfen	ESS voice	Voice
1984	Riptide	Lt. Wilcher	
1986	Armed Response	Lt. Sanderson	
1988	The Game	Federal Agent	
1989	A Nightmare on Elm Street 5: The Dream Child	Mr. Jordan	
1992	Love Field	Announcer	Voice
