= Linda Gibboney =

American actress

- Occupations: Actress, educator
- Years active: 1973–present

Linda Gibboney is an American actress, best known for her roles on soap operas and serials. These roles included "Sybil Thorne, R. N." on All My Children (1979–1981) and "Jenny Deacon Kendall' on Search for Tomorrow (1982–1983). Serial roles include Gina Blake DeMott Capwell Timmons Lockridge on Santa Barbara (1984–1985), and "Jessica Gardner" on Generations (1989–1991). She was also on an episode of Married... with Children.

A native of Bronx, New York, Gibboney is the youngest of three girls. For six years she was an art illustrator while she took acting lessons at night. She acted in repertory theater for eight years before she began performing on television.

Gibboney is one of the founders of Academy Arts Theatre Company, which produced off-Broadway and off-off-Broadway plays for five years.

She won a Soap Opera Award for her role as Gina Capwell but was replaced by Robin Mattson.

She is now a college professor at UCLA.

== Filmography ==
- Married... with Children as Miss McGowen Teacher’s Pets (1 episode, 1992)
- Generations (1989) TV series as Jessica Gardner #2 (unknown episodes, 1989–1991)
- Doogie Howser, M.D. as Mrs. Iger (1 episode, 1989)
- Highway to Heaven as Mother (1 episode, 1988)
- Dynasty as Maid (1 episode, 1986)
- Santa Barbara as Gina Blake Lockridge (various episodes, 1984–1985)
- Search for Tomorrow (1951) TV series as Jenny Deacon (unknown episodes, 1982–1984)
- All My Children as Sybil Thorne (various episodes, 1979–1981)
- Alien Zone (1978) (as Kathie Gibboney) as Julie
- The Brady Bunch (as Kathie Gibboney) as Linda (1 episode, 1973)
