= Stu Rosen =

American actor (1939–2019)

- Born: Stuart M. Rosen; June 26, 1939; Joliet, Illinois, U.S.
- Died: August 4, 2019 (aged 80); Los Alamitos, California, U.S.
- Education: California State College, Long Beach
- Occupations: Voice actor; puppeteer; director; writer
- Years active: 1965–2019

Stuart M. Rosen (June 26, 1939 – August 4, 2019) was an American voice director and voice actor.

== History ==
Shortly after graduating from California State College, Long Beach, Rosen got work as a production assistant at KCET. He wrote and starred in the TV series Dusty's Treehouse from 1968 to 1980.

Rosen voice directed many cartoons and commercials for television, including MASK, Hulk Hogan's Rock 'n' Wrestling, Fraggle Rock, the first episodes of Teenage Mutant Ninja Turtles (1987 TV series), The Legend of Prince Valiant, Super Secret Secret Squirrel segments of 2 Stupid Dogs, Biker Mice from Mars and many more.

Other such shows soon followed: Batman: The Animated Series, The Pirates of Dark Water, X-Men, Spider-Man: The Animated Series and Superman: The Animated Series directed by Andrea Romano, Gordon Hunt, Dan Hennessey and Tony Pastor, and Phantom 2040 also directed by Rosen.

Rosen had also had live-action roles in Rome and The Huntress.

== Death ==
Rosen died on August 4, 2019, at the age of 80, from cancer.

== Dusty's Treehouse ==
Dusty's Treehouse is a children's television program which starred Stuart Rosen and featured the puppets of Tony Urbano; while mainly airing as a local series, the show premiered nationally in fall 1975. Rosen was the creator and co-executive producer and based it on a program titled Dusty's Attic, which he developed and aired from 1966–67 on KCET, then an NET station in Los Angeles. The show won eight Emmy Awards.

Dusty's Treehouse originated from KNXT (now KCBS-TV), the local CBS flagship TV station in Los Angeles. It ran from 1970–1980 and was briefly syndicated nationally (including on the rest of the CBS O&O stations) and then appeared in reruns during the inaugural launching of the Nickelodeon children's cable TV network for four additional seasons.

Carrying on in a traditional style similar to Mister Rogers' Neighborhood and Captain Kangaroo, the show featured Dusty (Rosen) and his amazing custom-built treehouse where anything and everything could happen. Often Dusty had conversations with his puppet-animal friends including Maxine the crow, Scooter the squirrel and Stanley the red-haired spider in sneakers. Dusty also went on "tree trips" (field trips via balloon and basket) to factories to see how products were made, or to parks, zoos, aquariums, and so on. Other puppets and shadow puppets enacted classic fairy tales, too, including Cinderella, Beauty & the Beast, Puss in Boots, and The Legend of Sleepy Hollow. Topics included school performance, politics, music, behavior vs. misbehavior, kindness to others, good health habits, asking for help and even "being careful what you wish for," in an episode where Maxine magically becomes an ear of corn, Scooter becomes a walnut, Stanley becomes an apple and Dusty disappears. Jokes, songs and comic antics ensued, but always with a moral lesson to be learned. Sometimes a serious topic was tackled, ranging from Stanley coping with the death of his pet goldfish to Scooter being hit by a car for chasing a baseball out into traffic during game practice.

One episode involved Dusty himself learning a life lesson about how eating heavy food before bedtime (Maxine warns) causes nightmares; Dusty goes on a black light theatre journey through Nightmare Land and is chased by the menacing Mister Stomach Ache. But a new friend is made in the form of Sonja the gypsy fortune teller, a character who would reappear frequently in the show not by way of Nightmare Land.

In later seasons, the treehouse got a makeover and new supporting characters were introduced like Sunny and Stormy, two female puppets with opposing positive/negative viewpoints, and the mysterious Meef, a hairy, comical stranger with a pack-rat habit of swiping unguarded objects.

== Filmography ==
=== Television ===
- 2 Stupid Dogs – Additional Voices
- Biker Mice from Mars – Pit Boss, The Governor
- Fraggle Rock – Storyteller
- Iron Man – Crimson Dynamo (2nd voice)
- Kissyfur – Floyd, Stuckey
- My Little Pony and Friends – Additional Voices
- Phantom 2040 – Biot, GP Biot, Officious Stringer, Commander
- Superman - Catcher Henchman (in "Triple-Play")
- The Legend of Prince Valiant – Additional Voices
- The Mask: Animated Series – Additional Voices
- Wild West C.O.W.-Boys of Moo Mesa – Additional Voices
- Zazoo U – Dr. Russell

=== Film ===
- Annabelle's Wish – Doctor

=== Video games ===
- Gabriel Knight: Sins of the Fathers – Priest, Phone Guy #5, Beignet Vendor
- Quest for Glory IV: Shadows of Darkness – Yuri Markarov

== Crew work ==
- 2 Stupid Dogs – recording Director
- ABC Weekend Specials – recording Director (The Legend of Lochnagar)
- Attack of the Killer Tomatoes – Casting & Voice Director
- BattleTech: The Animated Series – Voice Director
- Biker Mice From Mars – Voice Director
- Captain N: The Game Master – Casting Director
- Defenders of the Earth – Voice Director
- Eek! The Cat – Casting Director, Sound Design
- Fantastic Four – Casting Director
- Fraggle Rock – Voice Director, Director
- Gabriel Knight: Sins of the Fathers – Voice Director
- Gabriel Knight 3: Blood of the Sacred, Blood of the Damned – Voice Director
- Hulk Hogan's Rock 'n' Wrestling – Voice Director
- King's Quest VI: Heir Today, Gone Tomorrow – Voice Director
- Kissyfur – Voice Director
- Little Dracula – Voice Director
- Little Shop – Voice Director
- MASK – Voice Director, Dialogue Coach
- My Little Pony: The Movie – Voice Director
- Phantom 2040 – Voice Director, Director
- Piggsburg Pigs! – Voice Director, Sound Design
- P.J. Sparkles – Casting & Voice Director
- Pryde of the X-Men – Voice Director
- RoboCop: The Animated Series – Voice Director
- Siegfried & Roy: Masters of the Impossible – Voice Director
- Space Strikers – Voice Director
- Teenage Mutant Ninja Turtles – Casting Director
- The GLO Friends Save Christmas – Voice Director
- The Incredible Hulk – Casting Director
- The Legend of Prince Valiant – Voice Director
- The Little Lulu Show – Voice Director
- The Magic Paintbrush – Voice Director
- The Mouse and the Monster – Voice Director
- The Old Man of Lochnagar – Sound Design
- Zazoo U – Casting Director
