= The House of the Dead (1978 film) =

1978 film by Sharron Miller

- Dutch-language release poster
- Directed by: Sharron Miller
- Screenplay by: David O'Malley
- Produced by: William Jackson
- Starring: John Ericson; Ivor Francis; Judith Novgrod; Burr DeBenning; Charles Aidman; Bernard Fox; Richard Gates
- Cinematography: Ken Gibb
- Edited by: Steve Michael; Sharron Miller
- Music by: Stan V. Worth
- Production company: Myriad Cinema International
- Release date: 1978
- Running time: 80 minutes
- Country: United States
- Language: English
- Budget: $685,000

The House of the Dead (also known as Alien Zone) is a 1978 American anthology horror film directed by Sharron Miller, and the only feature film Miller has directed. The film's ensemble cast includes John Ericson, Ivor Francis, Judith Novgrod, Burr DeBenning, Charles Aidman, Bernard Fox, and Richard Gates, along with Elizabeth MacRae, Linda Gibboney, Leslie Paxton, and John King. It consists of four short stories built into a frame narrative about a man who takes refuge from a rainstorm in the residence of a mortician, with the four stories relating the fates of four corpses in the mortician's care.

== Plot ==
An adulterous man named Talmudge finds himself lost in a rainstorm on his way back to his hotel. He is invited indoors from the rain by a mortician, who tells Talmudge that he acquires and embalms the bodies of people who experienced interesting and unique deaths. The mortician shows Talmudge several caskets, and details the fates of each of their occupants.

The first casket contains the body of Miss Sibiler, a school teacher who had a disdain for children. She is shown seemingly alone at home in her kitchen, where she turns on a radio and hears a mysterious noise coming from elsewhere. She investigates the sound to no avail, and upon returning to the kitchen, notices that the radio has been turned off. She goes upstairs to shower, and sees a silhouette through the shower curtain. Panicked, she closes and locks the doors and windows in her house. She is then confronted by three masked children, and initially believes that they have been playing a prank on her. However, more children enter her home, and remove their masks to reveal sharp teeth. They surround Miss Sibiler and maul her to death.

The second coffin holds the body of Growski, a man who had an affinity for cameras and photography. He is shown filming himself in his home, having invited a woman named Julie over for dinner. He convinces Julie, who is unaware that a camera is recording them, to remove her stockings so that he may perform a magic trick with them. He instead uses them to fatally choke her. He is then seen with a woman named Carol, who notices that the camera is running. He subdues her with a chokehold before strangling her with a cable. Finally, he is seen with Mrs. Lumquist, whom he stabs when she attempts to call a taxi to take her home. The mortician says that Growski was executed for the murders a year later, and that the state did not allow photographs to be taken at his execution.

The third story concerns Detective Malcolm Toliver, said to be the best criminal investigator in the United States, and Inspector McDowal, the greatest in England. The two egotistical sleuths are competing for the title of the world's leading criminologist. While having dinner together, Toliver receives a unsigned note telling him that someone he knows will die in three days, and that he is the only person who can prevent it. McDowal asks to follow Toliver along on this new case so that he may observe his methods, and Toliver agrees. Eventually, Toliver invites McDowal to his home to reveal his conclusion—that he, himself, is the intended victim, and that McDowal is the killer. McDowal shoots him, but Toliver, wearing a bulletproof vest, remarks that he solved the case two days prior, and activates a blade that impales McDowal. Toliver then opens McDowal's briefcase, which contains a timed explosive. The mortician possesses McDowal's body, and discloses that Toliver's body was too fragmented to be buried.

The fourth story follows an insensitive office worker named Cantwell. After dismissing the plight of a homeless man, Cantwell enters an empty store, and is unable to open the doors that lead back outside. He explores the place and is almost crushed in an elevator shaft. He becomes trapped in the building, and is subjected to mental and physical anguish, with only alcohol to drink. Eventually, an exit appears, and Cantwell wanders back into the outside world. Dirty and bloodied, Cantwell approaches a businessman who disregards him before entering the building himself. The mortician explains that Cantwell ultimately died in a gutter from a rotten liver.

Talmudge notices a fifth casket, which is empty. The mortician says that it belongs to someone who practiced infidelity. He then reveals that he knows Talmudge's name, and refers to him as a client of his. Frightened, Talmudge runs away, and is cornered in an alley and shot by the husband of a woman whom Talmudge was intimate with. Talmudge is loaded into an ambulance, and the mortician is shown sitting in the passenger's seat.

== Cast ==
- John Ericson as Talmudge
- Ivor Francis as The Mortician / A Good Feller
- Judith Novgrod as Miss Sibiler
- Burr DeBenning as Growski
- Charles Aidman as Detective Malcolm Toliver
- Bernard Fox as Inspector McDowal
- Richard Gates as Cantwell
- Elizabeth MacRae as Mrs. Lumquist
- Linda Gibboney as Julie
- Leslie Paxton as Marie
- John King as Marie's Husband
- Stefanie Auerbach as Carol
- Bo Byers as Growski Detective #1
- David O'Malley as Growski Detective #2
- Robert Telford as Maitre'd
- Michael Colley as Stan
- Gary Willis as Magazine Store Owner
- Robert J. Mildfelt as Cantwell Businessman
- Ben Smalley as Hanging Man
- Evan Tonsing as Newsstand Attendant

== Production ==
The House of the Dead was filmed under the working title Five Faces of Terror, with the help of non-unionized broadcasting students from Oklahoma State University. It was shot entirely on location in Oklahoma, in the cities of Ponca City, Yale, and Stillwater. It was financed by businessmen Leroy and Marvin Boehs, and had a budget of $685,000. The film's special effects were handled by Harry Woolman.

== Critical reception ==
The movie has received mixed reviews. David Parkinson of the Radio Times called the movie "Making her only feature and clearly working on a shoestring, director Sharron Miller generates few scares with this portmanteau horror."

Jim Hemphill of Filmmaker called the film "obscure but quite interesting", and wrote that it has "an impressive consistency of tone thanks to Miller's superb direction of her actors and her deft manipulation of the audience through sophisticated blocking and camera movement." He recommended it as "a great title to check out for Halloween if you want something a little off the established path." Brian Orndorf of Blu-ray.com referred to the film as "a strange assortment of half-realized chapters", writing that it "doesn't value character detail, only giving viewers the basics in temperament before moving on to the next piece of business." However, he noted that "it's not a total loss, especially for cult movie fans [...] who don't mind some sizable leaps in logic and limited connective tissue."

== Home media ==
In July 2018, the film was restored in 2K and released on DVD and Blu-ray by Vinegar Syndrome.
