= Ruth Silo =

American stage actress (1921–2012)

- Born: December 29, 1921; Bronx, New York, U.S.
- Died: October 13, 2012 (aged 90); Los Angeles, California, U.S.
- Occupations: Actress; Executive Assistant; Producer
- Years active: 1936–2012
- Spouse: Jon Silo (m. 1941; death 1996)
- Children: Susan Silo (daughter)
- Relatives: Burr DeBenning (son-in-law)

Ruth Silo (December 29, 1921 – October 13, 2012) was an American stage actress, Hollywood studio executive assistant, and community philanthropist. She began as a stage performer in New York City before reinventing herself in Hollywood as an assistant to writer-director-producers at Metro-Goldwyn-Mayer (MGM). Alongside her husband, character actor Jon Silo, she was involved in community and therapeutic volunteering, pioneering the "Laugh Therapy" program for physical rehabilitation patients at Cedars-Sinai Medical Center in Los Angeles.

== Early life ==
Ruth Silo was born on December 29, 1921, in the Bronx, New York City. She began her professional life as an actress in the New York theater scene.

== Career ==
Following expanded professional opportunities for her husband Jon, the family relocated to Los Angeles. In California, Silo pivoted her career from the stage to behind-the-scenes studio operations. She joined Metro-Goldwyn-Mayer (MGM) as an executive assistant, where she became known as a coordinator for high-profile filmmakers. She served as a key assistant to writer-director-producers, collaborating with people including Franco Zeffirelli and television producer James Komack.

== Philanthropy ==
In her later years, Silo became involved in clinical community service. Around 1990, her husband underwent a triple-bypass operation and suffered a mild stroke. During his recovery at Cedars-Sinai Medical Center, the couple's optimistic and resilient disposition impressed their physician, Harry Glassman. Glassman recruited the couple to share their philosophy with other patients. Prior to the Silos' involvement, the hospital's physical rehabilitation unit utilized pre-recorded comedy videos to boost patient morale. Ruth and Jon replaced these recordings with interactive, live comedy workshops, establishing the formal "Laugh Therapy" program.

Operating on a bimonthly schedule, the Silos led live sessions for groups of physical rehabilitation patients. The participants were predominantly elderly, and the Silos made specialized individual room visits to patients who were completely confined to their beds. Silo frequently differentiated their volunteer work from standard comedy entertainment, stating: "An audience in the theater comes to you. At Cedars-Sinai, we come to the audience". The curriculum relied on the Silos sharing humorous anecdotes and personal tales from their decades in show business to foster a relaxed, clinical environment. Once a rapport was built, patients were systematically encouraged to vocalize positive or amusing highlights from their own lives.

== Personal life ==
On October 9, 1941, Silo married Austrian-born stage, film, and television actor Jon Silo. He died on August 4, 1996. The couple had one child, a daughter named Susan, who was raised in New York City and became a child performer in the late 1950s and 1960s. She was later a voiceover artist in American animation.

== Death ==
Silo died on October 13, 2012, in Los Angeles, California. Her legacy of community service through humor was recognized in both her and her husband's retrospective profiles.
