= Ivor Francis =

American actor

- Francis in Pieces of Dreams (1970)
- Born: October 26, 1918; Toronto, Ontario, Canada
- Died: October 22, 1986 (aged 67); Sherman Oaks, California, U.S.
- Occupation: Actor/Acting coach
- Years active: 1950s–1986, his death
- Spouse(s): Jacqueline Giroux (divorced) Rosemary Daley (before 1986)
- Children: 4, including Genie Francis
- Relatives: Jonathan Frakes (son-in-law)

Ivor Francis (October 26, 1918 – October 22, 1986) was a Canadian-American character actor and acting teacher. He is the father of television soap opera actress Genie Francis.

== Life and career ==
Francis was born in Toronto and began his acting career on the radio in Canada. He served in the Royal Air Force in the Second World War and then moved to the United States, where he played the son, Joe, in the radio program Ma Perkins.

Francis made several appearances on Broadway, in such plays as The Devil's Advocate, Gideon and J.B. He performed frequently on television, with appearances in I Dream of Jeannie, The Odd Couple, Barney Miller (as four different characters), Happy Days, The Mary Tyler Moore Show, Hart to Hart, Benson, Hawaii Five-O, Starsky & Hutch, Dark Shadows, Bright Promise, Room 222, Get Smart, The Practice, Little House on the Prairie, The Six Million Dollar Man, Kojak and General Hospital, which starred his daughter, Genie Francis. He appeared as Carson Brookhaven in the syndicated comedy series Dusty's Trail for one season, 1973–74.

His film debut came in 1964 in The Devil Walks. Francis also appeared in such films as I Love My Wife, The World's Greatest Athlete, Superdad, Pieces of Dreams, The Steagle, The Prisoner of Second Avenue, Busting, The House of the Dead and The North Avenue Irregulars.

Francis died in Sherman Oaks, Los Angeles, California on October 22, 1986, from an undisclosed illness, at age 68.

== Filmography ==
Year	Title	Role	Notes
1961	Splendor in the Grass	Dr. Judd	Uncredited role
1967	Dark Shadows	Dr. Franklin	Episode #1.191
1969	I Dream of Jeannie	Ormandy	Episode: "The Blood of Jeannie"
1969	Days of Our Lives	Harry Larson	8 episodes
1969	Judd, for the Defense	James Macauley	Episode: "The View from the Ivy Tower"
1969-74	Room 222	Mr. Dragen	18 episodes
1970	Mir hat es immer Spaß gemacht	Ward Collins	
1970	Pieces of Dreams	Father Paul Schaeffer	
1970	Ironside	Claude Gauthier	Episode: "Check, Mate and Murder: Part 1"
1970	I Love My Wife	Dr. Korngold	
1970	The Young Rebels	Coates	Episode: "Father and I Went Down to Camp"
1971	The Late Liz	Dr. Murray	
1971	Honky		
1971	The Last Child	Dr. Young	ABC Movie of the Week
1971-72	Night Gallery	Pierre/Dr.Cottrell	2 episodes
1971	The Bold Ones: The New Doctors	George Wilson	Episode: "Broken Melody"
1972	The Bold Ones: The Lawyers	Dr. Venner	Episode: "Lisa, I Hardly Knew You"
1972	Cannon	Arthur Pearson	Episode: "Blood on the Vine"
1972	The Mod Squad	Dr. Leland Forrester	Episode: "Yesterday's Ashes"
1973	The Night Strangler	Dr. Webb	TV film - sequel to The Night Stalker
1973	The World's Greatest Athlete	Dean Bellamy	
1973	Outrage	Judge William Vernon	ABC Movie of the Week
1973	Superdad	Dr. Skinner on TV	
1973-74	Dusty's Trail	Mr. Carson Brookhaven	26 episodes
1974	Busting	Judge Fred R. Simpson	
1974	Happy Days	Dr. Ed Castle	Episode: "You Go to my Head"
1974	Kung Fu	Poindexter	Episode: "The Passion of Chen Yi"
1974	Goodnight Jackie	Professor at Funeral	
1974-75	Kojak	Henry W. Keiler/J. Warren Hale	2 episodes
1975	The Prisoner of Second Avenue	Psychiatrist	
1975-81	The Waltons	Professor Hoadley/Dean Raymond Beck	4 episodes
1976	Monster Squad	The Tickler	Episode: "The Tickler"
1976	S.W.A.T.	Dr. Reston	Episode: "Soldier on the Hill"
1976-82	Barney Miller	various	4 episodes
1977	Fish	Lattimer	2 episodes
1977	Spider-Man	Professor Noah Tyler	TV movie
1977-83	Quincy, M.E.	various	5 episodes
1978	The House of the Dead	The Mortician	Also known as Alien Zone
1978	The Eddie Capra Mysteries	George Burton	Episode: "Nightmare at Pendragon Castle"
1978	Snavely a/ka/ Snavely Manor	Hotel guest "Chief"	TV movie (unsold pilot)
1979	The North Avenue Irregulars	Rev. Wainwright	
1979	General Hospital	Dr. Eric Lombard	2 episodes
1979	Meeting of Minds	St. Augustine of Hippo	2 episodes
1979	One Day at a Time	Professor Bradley	Episode: "Back to School"
1979-80	Lou Grant	Jeffrey Anson/Everett Haywood	2 episodes
1981	240-Robert	Mr. Talmadge	Episode: "Hostages"
1981	Sanford	Judge Greenwood	Episode: "To Keep a Thief"
1984	The Mississippi	Judge Hawkins	Episode: "Informed Consent"
