= The Crayon Box =

- Created by: Shane DeRolf
- Starring: Greg Ballora; Phillip Baron; Kristin Chamey; E.G. Daily; Donna Kimball; James Murray
- Country of origin: United States
- Original language: English
- No. of episodes: 26

Production
- Producers: Richard Clayman; Stephen Chiodo; Edward Chiodo
- Running time: 15 minutes (paired with a 15-minute Bananas in Pajamas)
- Production companies: Chiodo Bros. Productions; Sunbow Entertainment; Random House Studio; PolyGram Television

Original release
- Network: Syndication
- Release: September 13, 1997 – June 13, 1998

The Crayon Box is an American live-action/animated children's television series that was aired in syndication from 1997 to 1998, based on the poem The Crayon Box That Talked by Shane DeRolf, which was first recited on the titular episode of DeRolf's series Zazoo U, before being published as a standalone book in 1997. The show followed Bananas in Pajamas as part of a 30-minute double-show, with each show being 15 minutes. The show's tagline was "A Good Show Helping to Build Great Kids". There were many characters beside the crayon characters, that were both live-action puppets, and animated.

The series was produced by Chiodo Bros. Productions, Sunbow Entertainment, Random House and PolyGram Television and its double-program was produced by Sachs Family Entertainment.

In Canada, it was shown on YTV.

== Characters ==
- The Crayons - a box of multi-coloured crayons, who introduce each episode's story then moralise at the end.
- Bubby (performed by Greg Ballora) - a brown bear, sensible and level-headed.
- Dotty (performed by Donna Kimball) - a young cat with dots, Dotty is clever and excitable but prone to selfishness.
- Lump (performed by Greg Ballora) - a purple dog, quite slow-witted but friendly and eager to please.
- Jack (performed by James Murray)- a cheeky Jack in the Box.
- Piggy Banks (performed by Kristen Charney, voiced by E. G. Daily) - a piggy bank, very pink and sweet.
- The Baby (performed by Donna Kimball) - a bonnet-clad baby who is wise beyond her years.
- The Sheriff (performed by James Murray) - a Wild-West Sheriff, authoritarian and clumsy, often losing his hat.
- Hugo (performed by Phillip Baron) - the Sheriff's horse, an intelligent hobby horse with an English accent who is quick to help the Sheriff whenever he gets in a muddle.
- The Cutout Sisters - Paperchain dolls who always sing to communicate.

== Adaptations ==
A book known as The Crayon Box that Talked was published on October 21, 1997 by Random House, written by Shane DeRolf, and illustrated by Michael Letzig.
