= The Return of Captain Nemo =

- DVD cover bearing the film's theatrical title: The Amazing Captain Nemo
- Also known as: The Amazing Captain Nemo
- Based on: Twenty Thousand Leagues Under the Seas by Jules Verne
- Written by: Norman Katkov (Parts 1–3); Preston Wood (Part 1); Robert C. Dennis (Part 1); William Keys (Part 2); Mann Rubin (Part 2); Robert Bloch (Part 3); Larry Alexander (Part 3)
- Directed by: Alex March; Paul Stader
- Starring: José Ferrer; Burgess Meredith; Mel Ferrer; Lynda Day George
- Music by: Richard LaSalle
- Country of origin: United States
- Original language: English
- No. of episodes: 3

Production
- Executive producer: Irwin Allen
- Producer: Arthur Weiss
- Cinematography: Lamar Boren
- Editor: Bill Brame
- Running time: 180 minutes (television); 102 minutes (theatrical)
- Production companies: Irwin Allen Productions; Warner Bros. Television

Original release
- Network: CBS
- Release: March 8 – March 22, 1978

The Return of Captain Nemo (theatrical title: The Amazing Captain Nemo) is a 1978 American science fiction adventure television miniseries directed by Alex March and Paul Stader (the latter directed the underwater sequences), and loosely based on characters and settings from Jules Verne's 1870 novel Twenty Thousand Leagues Under the Seas. It was written by six screenwriters including Robert Bloch and has been considered an attempt by producer Irwin Allen to duplicate the success of his Voyage to the Bottom of the Sea.

== Overview ==
During naval exercises in 1978, Captain Nemo (played by José Ferrer) is found in suspended animation aboard his submarine Nautilus beneath the Pacific Ocean. Revived by members of a modern-day US Government agency, Nemo is persuaded to rescue United States interests and in so doing battles with Professor Waldo Cunningham, a mad scientist played by Burgess Meredith.

Not originally aired as a movie, it was divided into three parts ("Deadly Blackmail", "Duel in the Deep" and "Atlantis Dead Ahead") expanded somewhat with about 45 minutes of additional footage over the three episodes to become a very brief action series. Sometimes described as a "miniseries", it was intended to be the first story-arc in an ongoing serial. Ratings were dismal, and the series never materialized.

Instead, this proved to be Irwin Allen's final foray into weekly science fiction television.

Robert Bloch makes no mention of the series in his autobiography (Once Around the Bloch) but commented on it in an interview: "I did an episode for a show about five years ago which was an abortive attempt at a science-fiction series (editor's note: The Return of Captain Nemo). The network gave the go-ahead on it, and they were going to do a four-part story. They assigned each individual episode to a different writer. You had four writers working, neither one of them knew what the other ones were doing, and they had a three-week deadline! And it went off the air after those first four weeks." Bloch's segment (co-written with Larry Alexander) was titled "Atlantis Dead Ahead" although in the theatrical release there are no titles for individual segments of the story.

The Return of Captain Nemo was a co-production between Irwin Allen Productions and Warner Bros. Television. It was originally shown in the United States as a three part miniseries (60-minutes each episode) on CBS from March 8–22, 1978 and portions of the three-episode series were then re-edited into a 102-minute version released theatrically overseas as The Amazing Captain Nemo.

== Cast ==
- José Ferrer as Captain Nemo
- Burgess Meredith as Professor Waldo Cunningham
- Mel Ferrer as Dr. Robert Cook
- Horst Buchholz as King Tibor of Atlantis
- Tom Hallick as Tom Franklin
- Burr DeBenning as Jim Porter
- Lynda Day George as Kate
- Warren Stevens as Miller
- Med Flory as Tor (silver android)
- Anthony McHugh as Radio Operator
- Randolph Roberts as Helmsman
- Richard Angarola as Trog (leader of Atlantis Great Council)
- Anthony Geary as Bork (an Atlantean)
- Stephen Powers as Lloyd
- Yale Summers as Sirak (an Atlantean)

== Episodes ==
No.	Title	Directed by	Written by	Original release date
1	"Deadly Blackmail"	Alex March	Norman Katkov, Preston Wood, Robert C. Dennis	March 8, 1978
The White House receives a transmission from the renegade Professor Cunningham. Threatening Washington, D.C. with a nuclear missile held in his submarine Raven, he demands one billion dollars in gold bullion. To demonstrate his capability, he blows up a small island with the Raven's 'Delta beam'. Cunningham is assisted by various androids including a large silver-headed one known as Tor. Meanwhile, during US Naval exercises, two Navy officers, Porter and Franklin, happen upon the submerged Nautilus, trapped under a reef since a seismic event dating back to 1877. On board the inactive vessel, they find a cryogenically preserved Captain Nemo, the sole survivor of the original crew. The newly revived Nemo offers his services in exchange for repairs to his ship. His ship Nautilus was constructed years ahead of its time, even possessing laser weaponry, defensive force fields and a nuclear reactor constructed 127 years before the events of the story take place. Nemo, whose submarine is protected from the Delta beam by an electric force field, manages to intercept and destroy Raven's missile, saving Washington with only seconds to spare and earning the repairs to his ship.
2	"Duel in the Deep"	Alex March	Norman Katkov, William Keys, Mann Rubin	March 15, 1978
At Pearl Harbor, the Nautilus takes on board Kate, who is a nuclear physicist and a strong feminist. The Raven, meanwhile, is running low on fuel. Cunningham heads for the Mindanao Trench where there are radiation canisters he used to re-power the Raven. Nemo intends to sail for Atlantis, but is persuaded to delay until facing Cunningham. In the ensuing chase, Cunningham leads Nautilus off course and through an underwater minefield. Nemo gets through the mines and creates a clone of Nautilus via 'kinetic projection'. He sends the clone into the Trench to fool Cunningham, who destroys it before detecting the real Nautilus. The Nautilus now heads for Atlantis and discovers its wondrous underwater ruins. Someone hails them, and Tibor, the King of Atlantis, comes aboard. He explains that Atlantis has been moved to underneath the ocean floor due to the prevalence of earthquakes. Nemo and Tibor swim out to Atlantis. Nemo meets the Atlantean Great Council, led by the antagonistic Trog. Tibor decides to trust Nemo, and both, with Atlantean councillors Sirak and Bork, return to the Nautilus only to find the crew 'frozen' motionless; this later proves to be due to Cunningham's 'Z ray' device.
3	"Atlantis Dead Ahead"	Alex March	Norman Katkov, Robert Bloch, Larry Alexander	March 22, 1978
The Nautilus is now under outside control from Cunningham. It is revealed that he previously captured many Atlanteans, which is why the Great Council hates humans. Tom is already aboard the Raven and is controlled by Cunningham via a special headband. Cunningham plans to extract all of Nemo's knowledge, including of how the Nautilus' nuclear reactor works, become the foremost intellect in the world, and devastate all the world's capitals. Nemo projects a vision of the US Navy Head reminding Tom of their mission. Tom removes his controlling headband and 'freezes' Cunningham and his crew with the Z-ray gun, freeing Nemo and King Tibor. Tibor and his two fellow Atlanteans head back to Atlantis. Tor unfreezes Cunningham and his crew. Nemo and Tom escape the Raven in scuba gear and head for the Nautilus, chased by members of Cunningham's crew. Overpowering one scuba diver, Nemo and Tom take his flare, which explodes, killing the rest of Cunningham's agents. Back on Nautilus, they unfreeze their crew. In the ensuing submarine battle, the Nautilus destroys the Raven. Later, King Tibor bids them farewell, and Nemo promises not to return to Atlantis, which should "remain untouched by our progress."

== Awards ==
In 1978, The Return of Captain Nemo received two Emmy Award nominations for Outstanding Individual Achievement in Any Area of Creative Technical Crafts. These were for Frank Van der Veer (optical effects) and L.B. Abbott (special photographic effects).

== See also ==
- List of underwater science fiction works
