= City Beneath the Sea (1971 film) =

1971 television movie directed by Irwin Allen

- Genre: adventure; science fiction
- Screenplay by: John Meredyth Lucas
- Story by: Irwin Allen
- Directed by: Irwin Allen
- Starring: Stuart Whitman; Rosemary Forsyth; Robert Colbert; Burr DeBenning; Robert Wagner; Richard Basehart
- Music by: Richard LaSalle
- Country of origin: United States
- Original language: English

Production
- Producers: Irwin Allen; Sidney Marshall
- Cinematography: Kenneth Peach
- Editor: James Baiotto
- Running time: 98 minutes
- Production companies: Motion Pictures International; Kent Productions, Inc.; Warner Bros. Television

Original release
- Network: NBC
- Release: January 25, 1971

City Beneath the Sea is a 1971 adventure science fiction television movie and television pilot for a proposed series by Irwin Allen featuring Stuart Whitman and Robert Colbert. It began as a conceptual 10-minute demonstration reel as a means to sell the plot and concept to television studios. The concept was not bought initially, and a few years later Allen produced it as a two-hour television movie for NBC. The two-hour movie failed to gain the response necessary for a series. In the UK it was shown theatrically in 1972 as One Hour To Doomsday.

It was released in DVD form as part of the Warner Archive Collection.

== Storyline ==
On June 12, 2053, a futuristic oil rig explodes somewhere in the Atlantic Ocean. Retired admiral Michael Matthews is busy in his New York City office administering various engineering projects in different parts of the world. He receives a telephone call from the president of the United States. After much debate and against his will, he is reactivated at his old rank as administrator of Pacifica, an underwater city which he designed. His escort, commander Woody Patterson, arrives to escort him back to Pacifica.

They embark via flying submarine for Pacifica. Matthews regrets returning to the city because of a past tragedy that had occurred there, and apologizes because his return means that Patterson will be demoted without cause. The two officers discuss the ongoing transfer of gold from Fort Knox to Pacifica, a project that began under Matthews' previous administration six months earlier and is now nearing completion. The commander at Ft. Knox General Puttman informs him that the substance N128 and the entirety of the American gold reserve will be secured at Pacifica within 17 days. The gold is essential to keeping the Pacifica global energy power plant in a balanced state.

Matthews' return re-ignites ill feelings in the city's scientific team that includes Dr. Lia Holmes, whose husband, Dr. Bill Holmes was killed as a result a Matthews' orders during his previous term. Matthews' return is soon explained at a closed door meeting back in Washington D.C. There, the President's chief science officer, Dr. Talty informs him that an approaching planetoid has disrupted the tides and resulted in earthquakes. The planetoid will strike the Earth near Pacifica in 7 hours. It is up to Matthews and the city's scientists and civic leadership to receive the gold, secure the blast proof vault, and evacuate the city in the remaining hours before the planetoid hits. On the surface, leaders will evacuate the coastal cities. At Pacifica, Admiral Matthews meets with his team: Brett Matthews (his brother), the city's structural engineer; Deputy Commander, Patterson; Dr. Aguila, a hybrid human and merman; Dr. Holmes; Captain Hunter, security director; and Professor Holmes (father of the deceased Bill Holmes) to develop a plan to meet the incoming rocket with the last gold shipment from Fort Knox and evacuate. The team reluctantly agrees to work on the tasks. In an effort to calm fears, Admiral Matthews offers his resignation to the Pacifica leadership once the gold project is completed.

Meanwhile, a recent accident involving Commander Patterson leads Professor Holmes to uncover similarities to the accident which killed Bill Holmes, his son. It was a power cell failure (the result of sabotage by a current engineering department employee) and not negligence on the part of Admiral Matthews that killed Bill Holmes. With these facts entered into the official record all doubts about Admiral Matthews. Unfortunately, the real culprits (Brett Matthews, Dr. Ziegler, and John Quinn) are planning to steal the H128 and gold amidst the evacuation. As the city begins to evacuate, including Lia Holmes' children and Professor Holmes, a frantic search for Quinn begins. Admiral Matthews devises a desperate plan to fire warheads at the incoming planetoid to deflect it. With assistance from Dr. Aguila, Li Holmes, as well as Elena, the command center supervisor, Admiral Matthews breaks legal protocol and launches the missiles. As Patterson oversees the securing of the H128 and gold shipments, Brett and Quinn attempt to steal some H128 and gold under the guise of helping. The two (Brett and Quinn) and a commandeered cargo sub are thwarted while trying to carry out the theft.

With the city saved, the planetoid diverted, and the criminals stopped, Matthews mourns his brother Brett, who died trying to escape. With a verbal chastisement the President thanks Matthews for his leadership.

== Cast ==
- Stuart Whitman as Admiral Michael Matthews
- Robert Wagner as Brett Matthews
- Rosemary Forsyth as Lia Holmes
- Robert Colbert as Commander Woody Patterson
- Susana Miranda as Elena
- Burr DeBenning as Dr Aguila
- Richard Basehart as President
- Joseph Cotten as Dr Ziegler
- James Darren as Dr Talty
- Paul Stewart as Mr Barton
- Sugar Ray Robinson as Captain Hunter
- Whit Bissell as Professor Holmes

== 1967 teaser reel ==
Allen filmed the original concept for City Beneath The Sea as a science fiction movie set in the year 2068, but it was never shown publicly. It remained unseen by the public until the DVD release of the Sci-Fi Channel's 1995 documentary The Fantasy Worlds of Irwin Allen, in which it was included as a special feature.

=== Plot ===
The plot concerns the destruction of an undersea drilling project that could possibly threaten the thriving undersea city of Triton, run by General Kevin Matthews with his associates Lia Holmes, scientific advisor Dr. Raymond Aguila (an amphibian/human hybrid who can breathe underwater) and his head of security Choo Choo Kino. Their lead engineer Temple is scheming to put an end to an underwater drilling project, which is spearheaded by the U.S. government and run by Matthews' team. In the finale, Matthews confronts Temple on the project's surface platform as it is destroyed in flames.

=== Cast ===
The proposed cast consisted of Glenn Corbett, Lloyd Bochner, Lawrence Montaigne, Francine York, Cecile Ozorio and James Brolin.

== 1971 television movie ==
The concept was later revised by Allen and television screenwriter John Meredyth Lucas in the form of a two-hour movie of the week. The story combined a natural disaster story with high-stakes crime drama and futuristic adventure. Many props and models from Allen's previous sci-fi series were included.

Filming took place in August 1970 at 20th Century Fox studios.

The movie failed to generate commercial interest for a series.

== See also ==
- List of American films of 1971
- List of underwater science fiction works
