= Zazoo U =

- Genre: Surreal comedy
- Created by: Shane DeRolf
- Based on: The Nine Mile Pile by Shane DeRolf
- Written by: Pamela Hickey; Dennys McCoy
- Voices of: (See "Voice cast")
- Opening theme: U Matta
- Ending theme: U Matta (instrumental)
- Composer: Jim Covell
- Country of origin: United States
- Original language: English
- No. of seasons: 1
- No. of episodes: 13

Production
- Executive producers: Phil Roman; Shane de Rolf
- Running time: 21 minutes
- Production companies: Film Roman; Fox Children's Productions

Original release
- Network: Fox
- Release: September 8 – December 8, 1990

Zazoo U is an American animated television series which aired on the Fox Children's Network block on Saturday mornings from September 8 to December 8, 1990. The show was created by children's author Shane DeRolf.

Ownership of the series passed to Disney in 2001 when Disney acquired Fox Kids Worldwide.

== Plot ==
The series follows the antics of a university college populated by different animals, known as the "Americanimals", who attend a zany institute of higher learning called Zazoo U. Each episode is based on a poem written by show creator Shane DeRolf, that teaches a moral lesson to children.

== Characters ==
Boink (voiced by Michael Horton) has a laid-back approach to life and seems capable of pulling almost anything out of his carrying case or locker.

Rawld-O and Buck (voiced by Dorian Harewood) are buzzards who rap and serve as kind of the Greek chorus for the show; commenting on the episodes' plot and sometimes carrying in the setting (as limited as they were) for the next scene. Rawld-O does all the talking for the pair while Buck beat-boxes.

Bully (voiced by Brian Cummings) is a woolly mammoth seen constantly dragging around a piano tending to get destroyed.

Dr. Russell (voiced by Stu Rosen) is a walrus whose verboseness often leaves his students more clueless than when the group started.

Grizzle (voiced by Jerry Houser) is a pig that prides himself on his stench and always has his drumsticks handy

Logan Chomper (voiced by Neil Ross) is a small yellow creature with a voracious appetite.

Ms. Devine (voiced by Tress MacNeille) is a high-class, self-absorbed fashionista who knows in loose terms.

Rarf (voiced by Danny Mann) is Devine's pet.

Seymour (voiced by Lee Thomas) is the geography teacher that got himself stuck inside a television set and now teaches from there, often interacting with the videos inserted for the lesson.

Slogo and Logan Bonito (voiced by S. Scott Bullock) are two acrobat brothers who live at the circus with their parents.

Tess (voiced by Susan Silo) generally tries to give Grizzle a wide berth.

== Voice cast ==
- Michael Horton as Boink
- Jerry Houser as Grizzle
- Brian Cummings as Bully
- Neil Ross as Logan Chomper
- Tress MacNeille as Ms. Devine
- Susan Silo as Tess
- S. Scott Bullock as Slogo and Logan Bonito
- Stu Rosen as Dr. Russell
- Danny Mann as Rarf
- Lee Thomas as Seymour
- Dorian Harewood as Buck, Rawld-O

== Crew ==
- Stu Rosen - Voice Director

== Episodes ==
No.	Title	Directed by	Written by	Original release date
1	"The Nine Mile Pile"	Jeff Hall, Tom Ray, Norm McCabe	Pamela Hickey & Dennys McCoy and Shane DeRolf	September 8, 1990
All the students arrive at Zazoo U for the first class, and immediately struggle to adjust to the school and to each other.
2	"The Crayon Box That Talked"	Jeff Hall, Mark Glamack	Pamela Hickey & Dennys McCoy	September 15, 1990
A box of talking crayons is discovered; each crayon wants to be the greatest of the box, and befriends each of the students to try to succeed.
3	"The Search for the Meaning of Life"	Jeff Hall, Mark Glamack	Pamela Hickey & Dennys McCoy	September 22, 1990
A troubled Tess sets out on a quest to find the meaning of life.
4	"Yesterday's Zoo"	Jeff Hall	Pamela Hickey & Dennys McCoy & Larry Parr	September 29, 1990
Boink, Tess and Bully search for Zazoo U's Janitor, and discover a world of past bygone relics.
5	"Is Bigger Better?"	Jeff Hall	S : Pamela Hickey & Dennys McCoy; T : Alicia Marie Schudt	October 6, 1990
The students enter a dispute about whether bigger means better. The dispute soon goes into bigger, but not better, dimensions.
6	"Har V and Sue"	Jeff Hall	S : Pat Allee & Ben Hurst; S/T : Pamela Hickey & Dennys McCoy	October 13, 1990
Tess and Grizzle fall out as friends, and vie for Boink's affections.
7	"Bully Loses His Temper"	Unknown	S : Pamela Hickey & Dennys McCoy; S/T : Tony Marino	October 20, 1990
Bully gets mad and loses his temper; an enraged miniature version of himself jumps out and storms around wreaking destruction. The class must now get the Temper back to Bully.
8	"Share a Chair"	Unknown	Pamela Hickey & Dennys McCoy	October 27, 1990
Everybody at Zazoo U gets a special gadget-laden custom schoolchair, except for Grizzle. But no one will share with him, so he gets despondent and wanders off, leading the class to search for him.
9	"Ms. Devine's Blues"	Unknown	Alicia Marie Schudt & Pamela Hickey & Dennys McCoy	November 3, 1990
Miss Devine is dejected about her pet Rarf being unremarkable, and thus possibly a worthless nothing. Rarf goes out of his way to prove he is special to her.
10	"No Strings Attached"	Unknown	S : Pamela Hickey & Dennys McCoy; S/T : Tony Marino	November 10, 1990
Boink discovers invisible strings that can be seen only with the imagination. But his messing around with the strings causes the laws of physics to go seriously awry.
11	"Money for Music"	Unknown	Pamela Hickey & Dennys McCoy	November 17, 1990
The class work to earn money to get new musical instruments. Grizzle and Tess try all sorts of money-making schemes, while Boink and Bully go around looking for donations.
12	"One Single Seed"	Jeff Hall	Pamela Hickey & Dennys McCoy	December 1, 1990
The school is invaded by an alien... a talent agent who's looking for the next big star. The agent himself possesses creativity, but can the others help him realize his potential?
13	"Boinks's Rap"	Unknown	Pamela Hickey & Dennys McCoy	December 8, 1990
Everybody gets ready for the school talent show, and all sorts of incredible antics and performances are in store. But Boink gets a serious case of stage fright, so it's up to the others to coax the show's best act out of him.
