= Jon Silo =

Austrian-born American actor (1907–1996)

- Born: Abraham Jonathan Margolis; July 22, 1907; Klagenfurt, Austria
- Died: August 4, 1996 (aged 89); Los Angeles, California, U.S.
- Occupations: Actor; Comedian; Humanitarian
- Years active: 1929–1996
- Spouse: Ruth Silo (m. 1941; death 1996)
- Children: Susan Silo (daughter)
- Relatives: Burr DeBenning (son-in-law)

Jon Silo (born Abraham Jonathan Margolis; July 22, 1907 – August 4, 1996) was an Austrian-born American actor, comedian, and humorist. Over a career spanning more than four decades, he performed on Broadway and appeared in television and film. Later in life, he and his wife Ruth established a volunteer "Laugh Therapy" program at Cedars-Sinai Medical Center for rehabilitation patients.

== Early life ==
He was born in Klagenfurt, Austria, Silo immigrated to New York City to pursue acting and adopted the professional name Jon Silo.

== Career ==
=== Theatre ===
Silo worked on the New York stage during the 1950s, his Broadway credits included Springtime Folly, Cole Porter's Can-Can, and Paddy Chayefsky's The Passion of Josef D.. He also toured nationally, including in a production of Oklahoma!.

=== Acting ===
Silo transitioned into television in the 1950s and 1960s. He notably appearing as the first guest actor in The Dick Van Dyke Show, as well as roles in The Outer Limits, The Munsters, My Favorite Martian, and Have Gun – Will Travel. He also made appearances on The Man from U.N.C.L.E., Mission: Impossible, and Kojak.

His film appearances included supporting roles in The Story of Ruth (1960), That Touch of Mink (1962), and The Fortune Cookie (1966).

== Philanthropy ==
After recovering from severe health challenges, including a stroke and heart surgery, Silo and his wife Ruth founded a "Laugh Therapy" program at Cedars-Sinai Medical Center using comedy and storytelling to boost rehabilitation patient morale. He also performed benefit shows for organizations like B'nai B'rith International.

== Personal life ==
Silo married actress Ruth Silo on October 9, 1941. The couple raised their family in New York before relocating to Los Angeles to follow Jon's acting career. The couple remained married for 55 years until his death. Their daughter, Susan Silo, became a widely recognizable child actress in the 1960s before transitioning into a prolific, voiceover career in American animation.

== Death ==
Jon Silo died on August 4, 1996, in Los Angeles, California, at the age of 89.

== Filmography ==
=== Television ===
Year	Title	Role	Notes
1951	Hands of Murder	European Men	1 episode
1951–1952	Not for Publication	The Gentlemen	5 episodes
1958	The Court of Last Resort	Attendant	1 episode
1959	Man with a Camera	Gas Station Owner	Starring Charles Bronson
1960–1963	Have Gun - Will Travel	Jean Passepartout / Clerk	2 episodes
1961	The Bob Newhart Show	Himself	1 episode
1961–1962	The Dick Powell Theatre	Sussman / Conductor	2 episodes
1961–1962	Adventures in Paradise	Servais / Claude Baronne	2 episodes
1961–1963	The Dick Van Dyke Show	John the Barber / Elevator Operator	Historic first guest actor
1963	The Outer Limits	Oswaldo	Sci-fi series; episode: "The Human Factor"
1963	The Eleventh Hour	Benny Falcon	1 episode
1963–1966	My Favorite Martian	Waiter / Vendor / Ice Cream Man	3 episodes
1964	My Living Doll	Maitre d'	1 episode
1964	The Man from U.N.C.L.E.	Alfonso Figueroa	1 episode
1965	Ben Casey	Landlord	1 episode
1965	The Munsters	The Russian teletype man	Episode: "Herman, the Master Spy"
1965	My Three Sons	Lion Tamer	Family sitcom
1965	McHale's Navy	The Italian Policeman	Military sitcom
1966	Man in the Square Suit	Waiter	TV Movie
1966	Mission: Impossible	Pick Pocket Victim	1 episode
1967	Run for Your Life	1st Waiter	1 episode
1968	Cimarron Strip	Jeweler	1 episode
1968	Mannix	Maitre D'	1 episode
1970	To Rome with Love	Vendor	1 episode
1973	Kojak	Krouse	Police procedural
1978	Sugar Time!	Friedman	Musical comedy series

=== Film ===
Year	Title	Role	Notes
1960	The Story of Ruth	Tacher	Biblical drama
1962	That Touch of Mink	Mario the Headwaiter	
1962	Beauty and the Beast	Benito	Fantasy feature
1966	The Fortune Cookie	Tailor	
1968	How Sweet It Is!	Hotel Clerk	Comedy feature

== Stage ==
=== Theatre ===
Production Dates	Production	Venue	Role(s)	Notes
Feb 26, 1951 – Feb 27, 1951	Springtime Folly	Golden Theatre	George Baroff	Original Broadway comedy
May 7, 1953 – Jun 25, 1955	Can-Can	Shubert Theatre	Policeman / Cafe Waiter (u/s Theophile)	Original Broadway musical; later took over the role of Theophile
Feb 11, 1964 – Feb 22, 1964	The Passion of Josef D.	Ethel Barrymore Theatre	Klurman / General Kornilov	Original biographical drama by Paddy Chayefsky
