= Bananas in Pyjamas =

Australian children's television series

- Created by: Helena Harris
- Directed by: Roger Bayley; Sophia Turkiewicz; Tony Tilse; Di Drew; David Caesar; Paul Faint; Karin Kreicers; Ian Munro; Michael Ailwood; Varcha Sidwell; Virginia Lumsden; David Evans; Richard Walker
- Starring: Benjamin Baylock; Mary-Ann Henshaw; Michael James; Sandie Lillingston; Shane McNamara; Nicholas Opolski; Taylor Owynns; Ken Radley; Jeremy Scrivener; Duncan Wass
- Narrated by: Karina Kelly
- Theme music composer: Carey Blyton
- Opening theme: Bananas in Pyjamas by Trapaga Vocal Group
- Ending theme: Bananas in Pyjamas (instrumental)
- Composers: Chris Harriott (1992–99); Peter Dasent (2001)
- Country of origin: Australia
- Original language: English
- No. of series: 6
- No. of episodes: 304 (list of episodes)

Production
- Executive producers: Claire Henderson (1992–94); Mark Barnard (1995/96); Virginia Lumsden (1999–2001)
- Producers: Helena Harris (showrunner, 1992–94); Tammy Burnstock (1994–1995); Virginia Lumsden (1995–1999); Mark Barnard (1999); Sophie Emtage (2001)
- Production location: ABC Studios
- Running time: 5 minutes
- Production company: Australian Broadcasting Corporation

Original release
- Network: ABC-TV
- Release: 20 July 1992 – 14 December 2001

Bananas in Pyjamas is an Australian children's television series that first aired on 20 July 1992 on ABC. It has since been syndicated in many countries and dubbed into other languages. In the United States, the "Pyjamas" in the title was modified to reflect the American spelling pajamas. It aired in syndication from 1995 to 1997 as a half-hour series, then became a 15-minute show paired with a short-lived 15-minute series The Crayon Box, under a 30-minute block produced by Sachs Family Entertainment titled Bananas in Pajamas & The Crayon Box. Additionally, the characters and a scene from the show were featured in the Kids for Character sequel titled Kids for Character: Choices Count. The pilot episode was Pink Mug.

The concept was inspired by the success of the song Bananas in Pyjamas, written by Carey Blyton in 1967, on Play School. This song, which had become a regular item on Play School, became the theme of the new series. The series was revamped in May 2011 as a CGI animated series created by Southern Star Entertainment.

== Summary ==
The main characters are two anthropomorphic bananas named B1 and B2. Other characters include the three teddy bears Amy, Lulu and Morgan, and Rat in a Hat. The bananas, the teddies and Rat in a Hat all live in the same neighbourhood, a cul-de-sac called "Cuddles Avenue". The bananas live next to the beach and serve as beach patrol. The teddies live next to and look after the park. Rat in a Hat works and lives at the community store. The characters enjoy eating "munchy honeycakes" and "yellow jelly".

== Production ==
=== Inspiration ===
The characters were inspired by a 1969 song written for children by British composer Carey Blyton. The jaunty song describes (an unspecified number of) bananas in pyjamas chasing teddy bears, with a slight twist at the end where a musical sting emphasises that the bananas like to "catch them unawares". The song was shown on the Australian version of Play School for many years accompanied by an animation depicting pairs of bananas in blue-and-white striped pyjamas. This led to a "banana" plush toy being created as part of the "toy cast", which formed the basis of the physical appearance of B1 and B2.

=== Filming ===
Creator, producer and showrunner Helena Harris devised the content of the ABC program at ABC Studios. Two of the bear characters, Amy and Morgan, are named after Helena Harris' children. The show was performed using human actors in elaborate costumes, in the style of the British Tweenies and Teletubbies. In the show's early days, the voices of the bananas were provided by the same actors as were inside the costume, but the original actors eventually gave up that aspect of the show and substitutes wore the hot, stuffy costumes. The show aired new episodes from its 1992 debut to its eventual run in syndication in 2002. The show aired approximately three hundred episodes as well as four specials. Its debut in the United States was in 1995. It made videos and other media from 1995 to 1999. A toy line, developed by Tomy, debuted in 1996.

== Animated version ==
Bananas in Pyjamas
- Created by: Helena Harris
- Written by: John Armstrong; Kym Goldsworthy; Holly Lyons; Kevin Nemeth
- Directed by: Craig Handley
- Starring: Sophie Aldred (UK Version); Isabella Dunwill; Richard McCourt; Shane McNamara; Troy Planet (AU Version); Stephen Shanahan; Ines Vaz de Sousa; Dominic Wood; Daniel Wyllie
- Theme music composer: Carey Blyton
- Opening theme: Bananas in Pyjamas by Rebecca Lavelle
- Ending theme: Bananas in Pyjamas (instrumental)
- Composer: Chris Harriott
- Country of origin: Australia
- Original language: English
- No. of series: 3
- No. of episodes: 156 (list of episodes)

Production
- Executive producers: Noel Price; Barbara Uecker
- Producer: Jacqueline Chan
- Running time: 12 minutes
- Production company: Southern Star Group

Original release
- Network: ABC2
- Release: 2 May 2011 – 22 July 2013

On 2 May 2011, a reboot of Bananas in Pyjamas, produced by Southern Star Entertainment in full CGI, was premiered on ABC2 in Australia; it was shown in other countries soon after that date. It contains new songs, stories, and characters, including Topsy the cheeky kangaroo, Charlie the inventive monkey and Bernard the wise old dog. Development of the new series commenced in 2009, and production started in early 2010. The new series contains 104 12-minute episodes.

== Characters ==
=== Main characters ===
- B1 the Banana: Duncan Wass (1992), Ken Radley (1993–2001), Michael James (2001), and then Stephen Shanahan (2011–13), Richard McCourt (2011–13)
- B2 the Banana: Nicholas Opolski (1992–2001), Benjamin Blaylock (2001), and then Daniel Wyllie, Dominic Wood (2011–13)
- Amy the Teddy Bear: Sandie Lillingston (1992), Mary-Ann Henshaw (1993–2001), and then Isabella Dunwill (2011–13)
- Lulu the Teddy Bear: Taylor Owynns (1992–2001), Monica Trapaga (Bananas in Pyjamas (album release)), Sandie Lillingston (Bumping and a-Jumping) and then Ines Vaz de Sousa (2011–13)
- Morgan the Teddy Bear: Jeremy Scrivener (1992–2001), and then Troy Planet (AU Version), Sophie Aldred (UK Version) (2011–13)
- Rat in a Hat the Rat: Shane McNamara (1993–2013)

=== Recurring characters ===
- Bernard the Dog: Keith Buckley (2011–13)
- Charlie the Monkey: Matthew Whittet (2011–13)
- Kevin the Butterfly: Mal Heap (1992–2001)
- Maggie the Magpie: Emma De Vries (1994–2001)
- Mrs Rat the Rat: Georgina Symes (2011–13)
- Tolstoy the Tortoise: Emma De Vries (1996–2001) and then John Leary (2011–13)
- Tomasina the Turtle: David Collins (1999–2001) and then Meaghan Davies (2011–13)
- Topsy the Kangaroo: Roslyn Oades (2011–13)

=== Farm animals ===
- Farm Animals puppeteers: Mal Heap, Terry Ryan & Emma De Vries (2001)
- Camembert the Cow: Taylor Sweeney and then Eliza Logan (2011–2013)
- Pedro the Pig: Michael Phillips and then Anthony O'Donohue (2011–2013)
- Gregory the Chicken: Matthew Hudak
- Peck the Duck: Aaron Oberst-Horner
- Dolly the Sheep: Maura McGinley and then Olivia Pigeot (2011–2013)
- Flash the Fish: Jacob Matta

== Episodes ==
=== Original series ===
Series	Episodes	Originally released	
Series	Episodes	First released	Last released
1	40	20 July 1992	11 September 1992
2	30	21 March 1993	30 April 1993
3	30	26 September 1994	4 November 1994
4	100	5 August 1996	20 December 1996
5	20	22 November 1999	17 December 1999
6	80	27 August 2001	14 December 2001

=== Revived series ===
Series	Episodes	Originally released	
Series	Episodes	First released	Last released
1	52	2 May 2011	22 June 2011
2	52	7 May 2012	27 June 2012
3	52	13 May 2013	22 July 2013

== Home video releases ==
The series has been released to home video, originally for VHS, later also for DVD.

- Birthday Special (1992)
- Show Business (1993)
- Hiccups (1993)
- Monster Bananas (1994)
- Big Parade (1994)
- Special Delivery (1994)
- Surf's Up (1995)
- Wish Fairies (1995)
- It's Music Time (1996)
- Singing Time (1997)
- Dress Ups (1997)
- Bumping and a-Jumping (1998)
- Holiday Time (1998)
- Fun Time (1999)
- Surprise Party (1999)
- It's Games Time (2000)
- Story Time (2000)
- Rock-A-Bye Bananas (2001)
- Summertime (2001)
- Dancing Daze (2002)
- Celebration (2002)
- Farm Adventure (2003)
- Beat Box (2003)

== Discography ==
- Bananas in Pyjamas (1993)
- Live on Stage (1994)
- Are You Thinking What I'm Thinking? Mix (1994)
- It's Singing Time! (1996)
- Bumping and a-Jumping (1997)
- Cuddles Avenue Christmas (1997)
- It's Show Time! (1998)
- Get Up and Dance! (2000)
- Banana Split Mix (2002)
- The Fun Collection (2002)
- Sing and Be Happy (2004)
- Welcome to Cuddlestown (2011)
- Playtime! (2012)
- Best Of: Classic (2015)
- 50 Best Songs: 25 Years! (2017)

=== Charting singles ===
List of singles, with selected chart positions
Title	Year	Peak chart positions
Title	Year	AUS
"Bananas in Pyjamas"	1998	82

== Cultural impact ==
In 1990, Elizabeth Watts-Legg with the pupils of the Broomfield House School performed a nursery rhyme version of Bananas in Pyjamas, which was included in the VHS Nursery Play Rhymes.

The Bananas in Pyjamas were featured among other famous Australians during the parade of the 2000 Summer Olympics closing ceremony.

In 2017, the Royal Australian Mint produced a commemorative set containing five-cent and 20-cent coins to mark the 25th anniversary of Bananas in Pyjamas. The five-cent coin, which is coloured for the first time, depicts Rat-in-a-Hat, while the twenty-cent coin depicts B1 and B2.

== Awards and nominations ==
=== APRA Music Awards ===
Year	Nominated works	Award	Result	Ref
1995	"We Like Wearing Pyjamas" (Franciscus Antheunis p.k.a. Franciscus Henri)	Most Performed Children's Work	Nominated	

=== ARIA Music Awards ===
Year	Nominated works	Award	Result	Ref
1994	Bananas in Pyjamas	Best Children's Album	Nominated	
1996	It's Singing Time!	Best Children's Album	Nominated	
1999	It's Show Time!	Best Original Cast/Show Recording	Nominated	
2005	Sing And Be Happy	Best Children's Album	Nominated	
2012	Playtime!	Best Children's Album	Nominated	

=== British Academy Children's Awards ===
Year	Nominated works	Award	Result	Ref
1998	Bananas in Pyjamas Special	International	Nominated	

=== Logie Awards ===
Year	Nominated works	Award	Result
1996	Bananas in Pyjamas	Most Popular Children's Program	Nominated
2000	Bananas in Pyjamas	Most Outstanding Children's Program	Nominated

== See also ==
- List of longest-running Australian television series
