= Shane DeRolf =

American children's author and producer

- Writing career
- Language: English
- Years active: 1990-present
- Genres: Children's literature and television
- Notable works: Zazoo U (1990); The Crayon Box That Talked (1997); The Crayon Box (1997); Big Green Rabbit (2007)
- Notable awards: Heartland Emmy, Webby

Shane DeRolf is an American children's book author and television producer based in the Denver, Colorado metropolitan area. DeRolf's career began with the production of Zazoo U in 1990 for the newly formed Fox Children's Network, in which his poem The Crayon Box That Talked, which served as the inspiration for the eponymous 1997 book and television series, was first recited. Additionally, the poem was featured in a 1997 Ad Council anti-discrimination PSA. From 1993 to 1995, DeRolf served as the Executive Vice President and Creative Director of the World POG Federation, and then assumed the role of President of Random House Entertainment after its founding, being affiliated with the company from 1995 to 1997. After Random House Entertainment was discontinued, DeRolf founded Smart Studios with a team of eight others, a production company focused on educational content.

In 2007, DeRolf founded Big Green Company, a lifestyle and media entity known for producing the television series Big Green Rabbit, and in 2015 founded the early-learning platform Big Word. His Big Green Rabbit website won a Webby Award, and the corresponding television series won 13 Heartland Emmys in 2009. Additionally, DeRolf has been involved in conservation-related projects, founding the Yesterday's Zoo multimedia project that includes a picture book, PSA, marketing campaign and children's award program. As part of his Smart Studios project, DeRolf also created the Watts on Your Mind campaign, an energy conservation-oriented project funded by the Environmental Protection Agency that featured characters such as a mad scientist and a monster.

== Works ==
=== Books ===
- Derolf, Shane (1995). Pogman Discovers America. Random House Children's Books. ISBN 978-0-09-966901-2.
- DeRolf, Shane (1995). Pogman and the Very Bad Hair Day. Random House. ISBN 978-0-679-87826-1.
- Derolf, Shane (1995). Pogman Thinks Big: The Mini Book of Mega Pog Milkcaps. Random House Children's Books. ISBN 978-0-09-968061-1.
- Derolf, Shane; Schauer, Mitch (12 December 1995). Pogman: Sea Whirled. Random House Children's Books. ISBN 978-0-679-87831-5.
- Derolf, Shane (1995). Air Pogman. Random House Children's Books. ISBN 978-0-09-966911-1.
- DeRolf, Shane (1995). The Official POG Milkcap Collector's Guide. Random House. ISBN 978-0-679-87827-8.
- DeRolf, Shane (1997). The Crayon Box that Talked. Random House Children's Books. ISBN 978-0-307-97485-3.
- DeRolf, Shane (1997). Romeo. Random House Children's Books. ISBN 978-0-679-88332-6.
- DeRolf, Shane (May 1998). The Little Box of Crayons. Random House Children's Books. ISBN 978-0-679-85460-9.
- Derolf, Shane (2025). So You Want To Write A Children's Book?.

=== Television ===
- Zazoo U (1990), creator, writer
- The Crayon Box (1997), creator, writer, producer, director
- Big Green Rabbit (2007), creator, writer, producer
