= Richard LaSalle =

Hollywood film score composer

Richard W. LaSalle (January 18, 1918 – April 5, 2015) was an American film score composer.

== Biography ==
LaSalle was born in Louisville, Colorado. He began as a performer for local hotels as a pianist and orchestra leader between the 1940s and 1950s. In 1958 he joined the American Society of Composers and Publishers in which started his main career in film composing. He died in Carmel, California.

== Selected filmography ==
- Tank Battalion (1958)
- The Big Night (1960)
- Sniper's Ridge (1961)
- Naked Youth (1961)
- Gun Street (1961)
- The Purple Hills (1961)
- The Clown and the Kid (1961)
- Deadly Duo (1962)
- The Broken Land (1962)
- Hands of a Stranger (1962)
- Incident in an Alley (1962)
- The Firebrand (1962)
- The Day Mars Invaded Earth (1962)
- Diary of a Madman (1963)
- California (1963)
- Police Nurse (1963)
- Twice-Told Tales (1963)
- A Yank in Viet-Nam (1964)
- The Quick Gun (1964)
- Blood on the Arrow (1964)
- The Time Travelers (1964)
- Apache Rifles (1964)
- Fort Courageous (1965)
- Runaway Girl (1965)
- Convict Stage (1965)
- Arizona Raiders (1965)
- Ambush Bay (1966)
- Don't Worry, We'll Think of a Title (1966)
- Boy, Did I Get a Wrong Number! (1966)
- 40 Guns to Apache Pass (1967)
- City Beneath the Sea (1971)
- Superbeast (1972)
- Daughters of Satan (1972)
- Piranha, Piranha (1972)
- Doctor Death: Seeker of Souls (1973)
- Alice Doesn't Live Here Anymore (1974)
- The Thirsty Dead (1974)
- Flood! (1976)
- Fire! (1977)
- The Amazing Captain Nemo (1978)
- Hanging by a Thread (1979)
- The Memory of Eva Ryker (1980)
- The Night the Bridge Fell Down (1983)
- Cave-In! (1983)
