= Michael Horton (actor) =

American actor (born 1952)

- Horton in 1978
- Born: September 5, 1952 (age 74)
- Occupation: Actor
- Years active: 1970–2005
- Spouse: Debbie Zipp (m. 1975)
- Children: 2

Michael Horton (born September 5, 1952) is a retired American actor whose best known and longest-running role was as Jessica Fletcher's nephew Grady Fletcher on Murder, She Wrote.

== Career ==
Horton appeared in television series such as Murder, She Wrote; Star Trek: Voyager; ER; Taxi; M*A*S*H; 21 Jump Street; Baywatch; and The Eddie Capra Mysteries. He appeared in Dances with Wolves. He played the recurring role of Enterprise Security Chief Lt. Daniels in Star Trek: First Contact (1996) and Star Trek: Insurrection (1998), credited as Security Officer in the former and Lieutenant Daniels in the latter.

His voiceover work in animation includes Rick Jones in The Incredible Hulk, Chip Chase in The Transformers, Hollywood stuntman Jeff Wright and Stormer's brother Craig Phillips on Jem, the younger brother Tommy Talltree of Airborne in the G.I. Joe episode "Operation Mind Menace", Arn in The Legend of Prince Valiant, and John Jameson in Spider-Man. Horton also voiced The Prince in the 1989 animated film, Happily Ever After. His last credited acting role was in an episode of Judging Amy as Alvin Harvey in 2002.

Horton is also a producer, director, and editor. He is the co-host of the podcast Digital Production Buzz, and a founder of the Los Angeles Final Cut Pro User Group.

== Personal life ==
Horton is married to actress Debbie Zipp, who played his onscreen girlfriend and wife Donna Mayberry in Murder, She Wrote. They have two children.

== Partial filmography ==
=== Film ===
| Year | Title | Role | Notes |
|---|---|---|---|
| 1983 | The Lords of Discipline | Bobby Bentley | |
| 1987 | Like Father Like Son | Mike O'Donald | |
| 1989 | Happily Ever After | Prince (voice) | |
| 1990 | Dances with Wolves | Captain Cargill | |
| 1996 | Star Trek: First Contact | Security Officer | |
| 1997 | The Beautician and the Beast | Fairytale Prince (voice) | |
| 1998 | Star Trek: Insurrection | Lt. Daniels | |
| 1999 | California Myth | Cop | |
| 2001 | The Learning Curve | Councilman Nolan | |

=== Television ===
| Year | Title | Role | Notes |
|---|---|---|---|
| 1978 | Columbo | Kerry Malone | Episode: "The Conspirators" |
| 1979 | Taxi | Steve Jensen | Episode: "Wherefore Art Thou, Bobby?" |
| 1980 | Alone at Last | Michael Elliot | Television pilot |
| 1982–1983 | The Incredible Hulk | Rick Jones (voice) | Main cast |
| 1983 | M*A*S*H | Curt Collins | Episode: "Say No More" |
| 1983 | Hill Street Blues | Nicky Kasner | Episode: "Praise Dilaudid" |
| 1984 | Newhart | John Payne | Episode: "Best Friends" |
| 1984–1995 | Murder, She Wrote | Grady Fletcher | 12 episodes |
| 1984–1995 | The Transformers | Chip Chase (voice) | 10 episodes |
| 1986 | Remington Steele | Wally Donovan | Episode: "Santa Claus Is Coming to Steele" |
| 1986 | L.A. Law | Tom Locklin | Episode: "The House of the Rising Flan" |
| 1987 | 21 Jump Street | Brent Styles | Episode: "Higher Education" |
| 1988 | Mr. Belvedere | Perry | Episode: "The Counselor" |
| 1989 | Freddy's Nightmares | Doug Wodehouse | Episode: "Welcome to Springwood" |
| 1989 | In the Heat of the Night | Jody Ware | Episode: "The Pig Woman of Sparta" |
| 1989 | Baywatch | Tony | Episode: "The Reunion" |
| 1990–1991 | Zazoo U | Boink (voice) | Main cast |
| 1991–1993 | The Legend of Prince Valiant | Arn (voice) | Main cast |
| 1995 | Spider-Man | John Jameson (voice) | Episode: "The Alien Costume" |
| 1997 | ER | Tom Angevine | Episode: "Good Touch, Bad Touch" |
| 1997 | Pacific Palisades | Richard Hughes | 3 episodes |
| 1998 | Star Trek: Voyager | Kovin | Episode: "Retrospect" |
| 2000 | Titans | Ted | 2 episodes |
