= Susan Silo =

American actress

- Born: Susan Margolis; New York City, New York, U.S.
- Occupation: Actress
- Years active: 1956–present
- Spouses: Burr DeBenning (m. 1966; died 2003) Michael Irwin Nave (m. 2010)
- Children: 2
- Parents: Jon Silo (father); Ruth Silo (mother)
- Website: www.susansilo.com

Susan Silo (née Margolis) is an American actress who is known for her work in voice-over roles.

== Early life ==
Susan Silo was born in New York City. Both her parents, Jon Silo and Ruth Silo, were actors.

== Career ==
Her acting career started in television on the episode "The Dick Clark Show" of The Jack Benny Show. Silo co-starred with Larry Blyden, Dawn Nickerson and Diahn Williams in the NBC sitcom Harry's Girls, about a vaudeville troupe touring Europe.

Her first TV appearance was when she entered and won a contest over 350 people who auditioned across the US, at age 15, to sing (Mr. Wonderful) on The Jerry Lewis Show on November 5, 1957. She also made guest appearances in episodes of numerous TV series from the 1960s to the 1990s, including Alfred Hitchcock Presents, Hawaiian Eye, McHale's Navy, Route 66, Gunsmoke, Bonanza, Wagon Train, Have Gun Will Travel, The Many Loves of Dobie Gillis, Sea Hunt, Ripcord, Hazel, Combat!, Batman, The Man from U.N.C.L.E., The Love Boat, L.A. Law and The Wild Wild West. In 1964, Silo appeared in an episode of Jack Palance's The Greatest Show on Earth. She also played Rita Lane on Gunsmoke in 1969.

Susan Silo is a successful voice actress, and she teaches workshops in this field and lectures all over the country. She is also a successful singer, which she has brought to her work in cartoons. Silo began her voice-acting career as a talking cow in a series of Land O' Lakes Margarine commercials for over ten years. In addition, she has done animated cartoon voices for Hanna-Barbera, Marvel, Disney, Ruby-Spears, DIC, Film Roman, Murakami Wolf Swenson and many others.

Her most known roles include Wuya in Xiaolin Showdown, Sartana of the Dead in El Tigre: The Adventures of Manny Rivera, Dr Karbunkle in Biker Mice from Mars, White Queen on Pryde of the X-Men, multiple voices on What A Cartoon, Sue on Pac-Man and Tess on Zazoo U. She also played the roles of Mama Mousekewitz in Fievel's American Tails and Petaluma in The Smurfs.

She has also done voices for video games, such as Crash Tag Team Racing and X-Men, where she reprised the White Queen. She later voiced Auntie Roon on The Life and Times of Juniper Lee and Flamestrike in Dragonlance: Dragons of Autumn Twilight in 2008.

From 2009 to 2012, Silo guest-starred as the cat empress Neferkitty on The Garfield Show. In 2014, she voiced Yin on Nickelodeon's The Legend of Korra.

== Personal life ==
Silo was married to actor Burr DeBenning. They have two sons together. Later, she married Michael Irwin Nave.

== Filmography ==
=== Television ===
Year	Title	Role	Notes
1957	The Jerry Lewis Show	Susan Silo	S1. Episode: 3
1960	The Jack Benny Program	Girl	Episode: "The Dick Clark Show"
1960	The Many Loves of Dobie Gillis	Joanne	Episode: "Dobie Goes Beatnik"
1961	Ripcord	Suzy Thomas	Episode: "Airborne"
1961	The Ann Sothern Show	April Fleming	Episode: "Almost April"
1961	Sea Hunt	Leilani	Episode: "Cougar"
1961	Alfred Hitchcock Presents	Angela	Episode: "Coming Home"
1961	Miami Undercover	Vicki	Episode: "Mystery of the Swamp"
1961	Route 66	Marva	Episode: "...And the Cat Jumped Over the Moon"
1961–63	Wagon Train	Betty Whitaker, Susan	2 episodes
1961–62	Hawaiian Eye	Lita, Shannon Malloy	2 episodes
1962	The Tall Man	Amy Beckett	Episode: "Quarantine"
1962	Ensign O'Toole	Girl	Episode: "Operation: Model T"
1962	Empire	MacCormack	Episode: "The Fire Dancer"
1962	Hazel	Gabrielle	Episode: "Hazel and the Lovebirds"
1963	Sam Benedict	Barbara Eddy	Episode: "Read No Evil"
1963	Have Gun – Will Travel	Taymanee	Episode: "Two Plus One"
1963	The Lieutenant	Marie Eckles	Episode: "A Very Private Affair"
1963–64	Harry's Girls	Rusty	Main role
1964	McHale's Navy	Babette	Episode: "Babette, Go Home"
1964	The Greatest Show on Earth	Susan Silver	Episode: "Love the Giver"
1964	Burke's Law	Phoebe McPhee	Episode: "Who Killed Everybody?"
1964	Combat!	Annice	Episode: "The Town That Went Away"
1965	Bonanza	Elena Miguel	Episode: "Woman of Fire"
1965	The Wild Wild West	Little Willow	Episode: "The Night of the Double-Edged Knife"
1965	The Man from U.N.C.L.E.	Anna Paola	Episode: "The Children's Day Affair"
1966	Dr. Kildare	Angie	3 episodes
1966	Batman	Mousey	2 episodes
1966	The John Forsythe Show	Michelina	Episode: "Engagement, Italian Style"
1966	My Three Sons	Janine	Episode: "Our Boy in Washington"
1966–67	Occasional Wife	Vera Frick	3 episodes
1969	Gunsmoke	Rita Lane	Episode: "The Long Night"
1969	Here Come the Brides	Ada Moon	Episode: "Next Week, East Lynne"
1971	Once Upon a Brothers Grimm	Little Red Riding Hood	Television film
1974	Yes Virginia, There Is a Santa Claus	Miss Taylor (voice)	Television film
1977	CB Bears	Zelda (voice)	Main role
1978	The Love Boat	Yvonne Boulanger	Episode: "Parlez-Vous?"
1982–83	Pac-Man	Sue (voice)	Main role
1984	Highway to Heaven	Mrs. Barney	2 episodes
1984–85	Kidd Video	She-Lion (voice)	Main role
1985	Robotix	Narra, Compucore (voice)	Episode: "Battle of the Titans"
1986	Inhumanoids	Sandra Shore (voice)	Main role
1986	The Smurfs	Petaluma	Episode: "Smurfette's Flower"
1986-1987	Alvin and the Chipmunks	Additional Voices	Recurring role
1986-1987	Foofur	Mrs. Escrow (voice)	Main role
1989	L.A. Law	Yvette	Episode: "The Unbearable Lightness of Boring"
1989	X-Men: Pryde of the X-Men	White Queen (voice)	Television film
1989	Ring Raiders	Siren (voice)	2 episodes
1990	The Wizard of Oz	Munchkin Mayor (voice)	Recurring role
1990–91	Zazoo U	Tess (voice)	13 episodes
1991	Toxic Crusaders	Mrs. Junko (voice)	Main role
1991	James Bond Jr.	Miz Fortune, Phoebe Farragut (voice)	Main role
1991	Attack of the Killer Tomatoes	Fang, Lillian (voice)	Recurring role
1991	The Legend of Prince Valiant	Barbarian's Mother (voice)	Episode: "The Journey"
1991–92	Darkwing Duck	Neptunia (voice)	3 episodes
1992	The Addams Family	Mrs. Quaint (voice)	Episode: "Dead and Breakfast"
1992	Fievel's American Tails	Mama Mousekewitz (voice)	Episode: "Fievel, the Lonesome Ranger"
1993–96	Biker Mice from Mars	Dr. Karbunkle (voice)	Main role
1994–96	The Tick	Jet Valkyrie, Jungle Janet, Johnny Omega (voice)	Recurring role
1995	Daisy-Head Mayzie	Miss Sneetcher (voice)	Television film
1995–96	The Twisted Tales of Felix the Cat	Various voices	Recurring role
1996	Richie Rich	Regina Rich (voice)	Main role
1996	Night Stand with Dick Dietrick	Elaine's Mother	Episode: "The Secret Crush Show"
1997	The Mask: Animated Series	Selina Swint (voice)	Episode: "Counterfeit Mask"
1997–98	Channel Umptee-3	Polly (voice)	2 episodes
1998	National Lampoon's Men in White	Alien (voice)	Television film
2003–04	ChalkZone	Stinky Witch (voice)	3 episodes
2003–04	Zatch Bell!	Zofis (voice: English dub)	Recurring role
2003–06	Xiaolin Showdown	Wuya (voice)	Main role
2004	Ozzy & Drix	Cryo (voice)	Episode: "A Cold Day in Hector"
2004–05	Jakers! The Adventures of Piggley Winks	Miss Nanny (voice)	Recurring role
2005	Avatar: The Last Airbender	Fisherman's Wife (voice)	Episode: "The Storm"
2005	W.I.T.C.H.	Miranda Beast, Slug (voice)	3 episodes
2005–07	The Life and Times of Juniper Lee	Aunt Roon (voice)	2 episodes
2006	Robot Chicken	Dorothy Zbornak (voice)	Episode: "Cracked China"
2006–07	Biker Mice from Mars	Dr. Karbunkle (voice)	4 episodes
2006–22	Curious George	Netti Pisghetti (voice)	Recurring role
2007–08	El Tigre: The Adventures of Manny Rivera	Sartana of the Dead (voice)	Recurring role
2008	Digimon Data Squad	Grandma Norstein (voice: English dub)	Episode: "Thomas Bursts on the Scene!"
2008–09	The Garfield Show	Neferkitty, Sir Leo's Agent (voice)	Recurring role
2009	Back at the Barnyard	Various voices	3 episodes
2014	The Legend of Korra	Yin (voice)	Recurring role
2014	Turbo Fast	Gypsy Moth (voice)	2 episodes
2016	Blaze and the Monster Machines	Grammy (voice)	3 episodes
2017	Niko and the Sword of Light	Dolphin Queen, Shrimp Trooper (voice)	Episode: "From the Sea of Suffering to the Faraway Shore"
2019	The Tom and Jerry Show	Aunt Louella (voice)	2 episodes
2020	The Rocketeer	Irma Philpot (voice)	3 episodes
2026	The Loud House	Gertie (voice)	Episode: "Spy Dames"

=== Film ===
Year	Title	Role	Notes
1965	McHale's Navy Joins the Air Force	Smitty Smith	
1971	Marriage: Year One	Shirley Lemberg	
1988	Pound Puppies and the Legend of Big Paw	Florence (voice)	
1990	Jetsons: The Movie	Gertrude (voice)	
1992	Beauty and the Beast	Alicia, Clara, Evil Fairy	
1992	Thumbelina	Thumbelina	
1992	Bebe's Kids	Additional voices	
1992	The Little Mermaid	Cassandra	
1993	Once Upon a Forest	Russell's Mother (voice)	
1994	Snow White and the Magic Mirror	Wicked Queen	
1997	Babes in Toyland	Scat (voice)	
1999	Kiss Toledo Goodbye	Mrs. Beidekker	
2002	Lilo & Stitch	Police Cruiser Computer (voice)	
2006	Dr. Dolittle 3	Mary (voice)	
2006	The Ant Bully	Ant #4 (voice)	
2007	Dead Silence	Old Woman	
2008	Dragonlance: Dragons of Autumn Twilight	Flamestrike (voice)	
2009	Curious George: A Very Monkey Christmas	Netti Pisghetti (voice)	
2011	The Rite	Lady	

=== Video games ===
Year	Title	Role	Notes
1992	X-Men	Emma Frost / White Queen	
1993	Gabriel Knight: Sins of the Fathers	Cazaunoux	
1993	Quest for Glory: Shadows of Darkness	Baba Yaga, Fenris, Olga Stovich	
1994	Freddy Pharkas: Frontier Pharmacist	Helen Back, Madame Ovaree	
1995	Snow White and the Magic Mirror: Interactive Storybook	Wicked Queen	
1995	Shannara	Aine Elessedil, Gnome Healer, Geeka	
1996	Tiny Toon Adventures: Buster and the Beanstalk	White Sheeps, Shop Sheep	
1997	Tamagotchi CD-ROM	Voice	
1998	Dr. Seuss Kindergarten	Mother Bippo-No-Bungus	
1998	Dr. Seuss Preschool	Queen Sneezlebee, Mayzie	
1999	Gabriel Knight 3: Blood of the Sacred, Blood of the Damned	Girard, Marcie	
2000	Giants: Citizen Kabuto	Queen Sappho	
2000	Sacrifice	Seerix	
2001	Emperor: Battle for Dune	Executrix Council	
2002	Earth & Beyond	Councilor Uja'da	
2003	RTX Red Rock	Old Soul #4	
2003	Tales of Symphonia	Additional Voices	
2004	Crash Twinsanity	Nina Cortex, Madame Amberley	
2004	Zatch Bell! Mamodo Fury	Zofis	
2005	Crash Tag Team Racing	Old Women, Mature Women	
2005	Zatch Bell! Mamodo Battles	Zofis	
2005	Guild Wars	Glint, Justiciar Taran	
2005	Guild Wars Prophecies	Glint	
2006	Xiaolin Showdown	Wuya	
2006	Dead Rising	Lindsay Harris	
2007	God of War II	Clotho	
2007	Clive Barker's Jericho	Hanne Lichthammer	
2007	Neverwinter Nights 2: Mask of the Betrayer	Nefris, Founder, Gulk'aush	
2008	The Mummy: Tomb of the Dragon Emperor	Narrator	
2009	The Saboteur	Voice	
2009	Undead Knights	Narrator	
2012	Diablo III	Additional Voices	
2013	The Last of Us	Additional Voices	
2014	Tales from the Borderlands	Vallory	
2015	Final Fantasy Type-0 HD	Cadetmaster	
2015	Mad Max	Wasterlander	
2016	Dead Rising 4	Lindsay Harris	
2020	Final Fantasy VII Remake	Mireille	
2021	The Artful Escape	Magic Cat, Resident 1	
2023	Nickelodeon All-Star Brawl 2	Sartana of the Dead	
2024	Final Fantasy VII Rebirth	Additional Voices	
