= X-Men: Pryde of the X-Men =

American television pilot

- VHS cover
- Genre: Superhero
- Based on: X-Men by: Stan Lee; Jack Kirby
- Written by: Larry Parr
- Directed by: Ray Lee (as "Direction Supervision"); Stu Rosen (voice director)
- Voices of: Michael Bell; Earl Boen; Andi Chapman; Pat Fraley; Ron Gans; Dan Gilvezan; Alan Oppenheimer; Patrick Pinney; Neil Ross; Susan Silo; Kath Soucie; John Stephenson; Alexandra Stoddart; Frank Welker
- Narrated by: Stan Lee
- Composer: Robert J. Walsh
- Country of origin: United States
- Original language: English
- No. of episodes: 1

Production
- Executive producers: Margaret Loesch; Lee Gunther
- Producers: Rick Hoberg; Larry Houston; Will Meugniot
- Editor: Al Breitenbach
- Running time: 30 minutes (including commercials)
- Production company: Marvel Productions

Original release
- Network: First-run syndication
- Release: September 16, 1989

Related
- Marvel Action Universe

X-Men: Pryde of the X-Men is an American animated television pilot originally broadcast in 1989 on the Marvel Action Universe television block, featuring Marvel Comics' mutant superheroes of the X-Men. The pilot aired infrequently in syndication and was later released on video. It later served as the basis for Konami's X-Men arcade game.

== Overview ==
=== Television pilot ===
The title is a pun on the name of Kitty Pryde, the youngest of the X-Men by the time the pilot was produced. The series that this episode was intended to launch never materialized; Marvel Productions went back to the drawing board for 1992's X-Men: The Animated Series. The pilot itself is most specifically influenced by issues #129–139 of Uncanny X-Men.

Shortly after this pilot was delivered, Marvel started having financial issues (New World Pictures, who purchased the Marvel Entertainment Group or MEG from Cadence Industries in 1986, sold MEG in January 1989 to the Andrews Group) and stopped work on every project in progress, except Muppet Babies. This pilot effectively marked the end of the Marvel animated universe created by DePatie–Freleng Enterprises/Marvel Productions, which began with Fantastic Four (1978) and continued with Spider-Woman (1979), Spider-Man (1981), Spider-Man and His Amazing Friends (1981) and The Incredible Hulk (1982). The X-Men themselves had previously guest starred in several episodes of Spider-Man and His Amazing Friends, although that series isn't in the same continuity as "Pryde of the X-Men".

=== Characters ===
Narrated by X-Men co-creator Stan Lee, Pryde of the X-Men stars Professor X and the X-Men - Cyclops, Storm, Nightcrawler, Colossus, Wolverine, Kitty Pryde, and Dazzler - saving the world from Magneto and his Brotherhood of Mutant Terrorists (Toad, Blob, Pyro, Juggernaut, and White Queen). The X-Mansion, Danger Room, Cerebro, Blackbird, and Lockheed are also featured.

=== Plot ===
The X-Men's archenemy Magneto is being transported by a military convoy. Magneto is unable to use his powers, trapped in a force field, until he is freed by the White Queen, a member of his "Brotherhood of Mutant Terrorists", allowing him to use his magnetic powers to tear apart his portable prison and escape.

Elsewhere, Kitty Pryde arrives at Professor Xavier's school to begin training her phasing powers, allowing her to pass through solid matter. In the Danger Room, Kitty is introduced to the X-Men: Cyclops, Colossus, Dazzler, Nightcrawler, Storm, and Wolverine. Frightened by Nightcrawler's demonic appearance, Kitty almost causes the Danger Room to go haywire, making Wolverine protest her recruitment.

Magneto sends Pyro and Blob to retrieve the tracking coordinates for the Scorpio comet approaching Earth, with the secondary goal of distracting the X-Men while Magneto and Juggernaut invade the X-Mansion. Xavier reads Magneto's thoughts, learning that they seek to steal the "mutant power circuit" of Cerebro; he gives it to Kitty and orders her to flee, but Magneto manages to capture it.

The X-Men return from their confrontation with Blob and Pyro to find the mansion in ruins, and the Professor and Kitty unconscious. Xavier reads Magneto's thoughts again and learns his full plan: to redirect the Scorpio comet onto a collision course with Earth and plunge the planet into another ice age, which would leave normal humans weakened, allowing the mutants to take over. The X-Men leave for Magneto's sanctuary Asteroid M, but the X-Men instruct Kitty to stay, as the mission is far too dangerous and she has not been trained. Kitty, wanting to prove her worth and make amends for her previous failure, phases aboard the Blackbird and hides, with Xavier's permission.

Upon reaching the asteroid, each X-Man meets an obstacle on the way to Magneto: Storm covers the breach the X-Men blow into Asteroid M, Dazzler takes on Pyro, Wolverine traps Toad, Colossus engages Juggernaut, and Cyclops battles White Queen. After teleporting past Blob, Nightcrawler confronts Magneto as the Scorpio comet approaches Earth. As Magneto is about to blast Nightcrawler, Kitty emerges from the floor, causing Magneto to accidentally blast the wiring of his device. Nightcrawler teleports up and uses his body as a conduct, while Kitty knocks Magneto onto the platform, using his power to redirect the comet's course towards Asteroid M. Nightcrawler must risk sacrificing himself to complete the machine's circuit, or the comet will change course back to Earth.

The X-Men watch from the Blackbird for Nightcrawler to teleport at the last minute. The comet and asteroid collide, but Nightcrawler rematerializes out in space. The team attempts to retrieve him with the Blackbird's grappler arms, but they miss, and he apparently disintegrates. While the X-Men mourn Nightcrawler, he emerges from a storage locker, revealing that he teleported himself into the plane before the atmospheric compression burned up his suit. While the X-Men give Kitty credit for her efforts, Wolverine insists that Kitty is not yet a member of the X-Men.

== Credits ==
=== Voice Cast ===
Michael Bell	Cyclops, additional voices
Andi Chapman	Storm, additional voices
Ron Gans	Juggernaut
Alan Oppenheimer	Blob, Colonel Chaffey
Neil Ross	Nightcrawler, additional voices
Kath Soucie	Kitty Pryde
Alexandra Stoddart	Dazzler, additional voices
Earl Boen	Magneto
Pat Fraley	Pyro, additional voices
Dan Gilvezan	Colossus
Patrick Pinney	Wolverine, additional voices
Susan Silo	White Queen
John Stephenson	Professor X, additional voices
Frank Welker	Toad, Lockheed

=== Crew ===
Stan Lee	Narration
Larry Parr	Writer
Will Meugniot	Producer
Ray Lee	Animation director
Stu Rosen	Voice director
Margaret Loesch and Lee Gunther	Executive producers
Robert J. Walsh	Composer

== Critical response ==
The pilot drew generally mixed reactions. While the animation was praised, the story was criticized for its campy tone compared to the grittier themes of the comics. Several changes made from the source material drew criticism, particularly the inclusion of the White Queen as a member of the Brotherhood of Mutants, the characterization of Kitty Pryde as a damsel in distress, and the Canadian Wolverine speaking with an Australian accent.

== Tie-ins ==
=== Graphic novels ===
In 1990, Marvel published a graphic novel titled X-Men Animation Special, an adaptation of Pryde of the X-Men that featured film images of cel animation rather than original art.

=== Video games ===
In 1989, X-Men: Madness in Murderworld, simply known as X-Men, was released for MS-DOS, Commodore 64, and Amiga computer systems. It was developed and published by Paragon Software in 1989 and featured the cast of Pryde of the X-Men. It was a side-scroller with puzzles set in Murderworld. A limited edition comic book was included.

In 1990, LJN released The Uncanny X-Men for the Nintendo Entertainment System, featuring a near exact lineup of the team from Pryde of the X-Men, only swapping out Dazzler for Iceman. The game received negative reviews, and was named one of the worst superhero games of all time by Seanbaby.

In 1992, Konami produced an X-Men arcade game based on Pryde of the X-Men, featuring Cyclops, Colossus, Wolverine, Storm, Nightcrawler, and Dazzler.
