= List of Spider-Man and His Amazing Friends characters =

This is a list of Spider-Man and His Amazing Friends characters.

== Spider-Friends ==
Peter Parker (Spider-Man), Bobby Drake (Iceman), and Angelica Jones (Firestar) are all college students at Empire State University. After working together to defeat the Beetle and recovering the "Power Booster" he stole from Tony Stark (a.k.a. Iron Man, who rewards them with the advanced computer systems seen in several episodes and the opening titles) the trio decide to team-up permanently as the "Spider-Friends". They live together in Peter's Aunt May's home with her and a pet dog, Ms. Lion, a Lhasa Apso, who often acts as comic relief. The show also featured Spider-Man's customary sense of humour and had a running gag of Iceman and Firestar (who can use their powers to get in to "costume" as shown in the opening titles) waiting for Peter to change in to the Spider-Man Suit. Together, the superheroes battle various supervillains.

=== Peter Parker/Spider-Man ===
Actor Dan Gilvezan gave voice to this incarnation of the wall-crawler. This series also featured a number of Marvel guest stars, and shared many of its character designs with the solo Spider-Man show produced just before it.

=== Bobby Drake/Iceman ===
In the animated series Spider-Man and His Amazing Friends, Iceman is voiced by Frank Welker. In a few episodes, he appears with his and Firestar's former teammates, the X-Men. In the episode "Vengeance Of Loki", he's revealed to be a government agent; his codename is "Windchill Factor Zero". In "Mission: Save The Guardstar" his younger half-sister, Aurora Dante (Lightwave), was introduced. One entire episode was devoted to Iceman's origin story. Throughout the series, Iceman has a romantic infatuation with Firestar.

=== Angelica Jones/Fire-Star ===
Fire-Star was originally created for the animated series Spider-Man and His Amazing Friends. Series creators had originally wanted to use the Human Torch, but the rights to the character were tied up. Kathy Garver provided her voice.

In the series, Fire-Star (whose pre-production names included Heatwave, Starblaze, and Firefly) is identified as being a former member of the X-Men, along with Iceman, with whom she occasionally appears to have a playful flirtation and sometimes dates. At times she dates Peter Parker (Spider-Man) as well, resulting in a relaxed love triangle of sorts (though Iceman states that, despite his feelings for Firestar, "fire and ice don't really mix"). Fire-Star also has a one-episode romance with Sunfire.

The animated series and the one-shot Spider-Man and His Amazing Friends comic book (which adapted an episode for print) are not considered part of standard Marvel Universe continuity. However, a recent one-shot comic, Spider-Man Family: Amazing Friends (August 2006), features an in-continuity story, "Opposites Attack!", in which the three superheroes work as a short-lived team. This story takes place shortly after up-and-coming hero Firestar becomes a founding member of the New Warriors.

== Supporting characters ==
=== Black Knight ===
The medieval Black Knight appeared in the episode "Knights & Demons", scripted by Don Glut. Dane Whitman was also to appear, but was rejected to avoid confusion.

=== Captain America ===
Captain America appeared in two episodes, "7 Little Superheroes" and "Pawns of the Kingpin", where he was voiced by George DiCenzo.

=== Daredevil ===
Daredevil makes his first animated television appearance in the episode "Attack of the Arachnoid", voiced by Frank Welker.

=== Hulk ===
Bruce Banner and the Hulk appear in the episode "Spidey Goes Hollywood", voiced by Peter Cullen. The Spider-Friends encountered Banner and had Sam Blockbuster give him a job on the Spider-Man movie. When Mysterio unleashes a robot Hulk in one of the scenes, Banner turns into the Hulk and fights the robot Hulk and destroys it.

=== Iron Man ===
His guest appearances started in 1981, when Iron Man appeared in Spider-Man and His Amazing Friends with William H. Marshall providing his voice. Following a cameo with the rest of the Avengers in the 1981 solo Spider-Man show, Iron Man returned to animation with that decade's Spider-Man and His Amazing Friends. He made cameo appearances throughout the series, most prominently in "The Origin of the Spider-Friends", in which Tony Stark is a central character.

=== Lightwave ===
Lightwave's real name is Aurora Dante. Like her older half-brother Bobby Drake (a.k.a. the superhero Iceman), Lightwave is a mutant. She can manipulate and control light. Her other light-based powers include a powerful laser blast and a photon force field. She can also transform herself into light; in such a form, she is able to exist in the vacuum of outer space.

Lightwave's only appearance was in "Save the GuardStar", the final episode of the 1980s cartoon. She is voiced by Marlene Aragon. Bobby Drake explains his heretofore unknown sister as a half-sister with whom he shares the same mother.

An agent of S.H.I.E.L.D., Lightwave is considered a traitor, due to mind control by rogue S.H.I.E.L.D. agent Buzz Mason. Mason induces Lightwave to steal assorted devices to create a "quantum enhancer" which would increase her powers 1,000 times. With such power, Lightwave would be able to control the GuardStar satellite which orbits the Earth and controls all defense systems and communications systems for the United States. Mason expects world conquest since he controls Lightwave.

Iceman, Firestar, and Spider-Man attempt to stop Lightwave, but she is powerful enough to defeat them. Aboard a space vessel, Buzz Mason forces Iceman into outer space, dooming Iceman if he remains there for long. Spider-Man convinces Lightwave to realize that the half-brother she loves is in mortal danger. Her reaction breaks Mason's control over her, and she saves Iceman and disables Mason long enough for Spider-Man to subdue him.

Presumably, with Mason's role realized, S.H.I.E.L.D. restores Lightwave's good standing. As this is Lightwave's only appearance, her fate is unknown.

=== Namor ===
Namor appeared in the episode "7 Little Superheroes", alongside Captain America, Shanna the She-Devil, and Doctor Strange. Another episode featured someone dressed as the Sub-Mariner.

=== Uncle Ben Parker ===
Uncle Ben appears in the episode "Along Came Spidey", voiced by Frank Welker. He is featured in Spider-Man's flashback of his origin.

=== Aunt May Parker ===
Aunt May appeared several times in the course of Spider-Man and His Amazing Friends, voiced by June Foray. The Spider-Friends secretly operated in her house.

=== Shanna the She-Devil ===
Shanna the She-Devil appeared in the episode "7 Little Superheroes", voiced by Janet Waldo. She was summoned to Wolf Island by Chameleon alongside other heroes Spider-Man, Iceman, Firestar, Captain America, Namor, and Doctor Strange. She is referred to as Shanna the Jungle Queen rather than the She-Devil however.

=== S.H.I.E.L.D. ===
S.H.I.E.L.D.'s first television appearance was in the episode "Mission: Save the Guardstar".

=== Doctor Strange ===
Doctor Strange appears in the episode "7 Little Superheroes".

=== Sunfire ===
Sunfire guest-starred in the episode "Sunfire", voiced by Jerry Dexter. In the episode, he and Firestar fell in love amidst their adventures with Firestar's friends Spider-Man and Iceman. His uncle Jin Ju plotted to use Sunfire and Firestar in his plan to hatch his fire monster. Sunfire and the Spider-Friends stopped the fire monster and Sunfire returned to Japan to have his uncle recover in a hospital.

=== Flash Thompson ===
Spider-Man and His Amazing Friends was Flash Thompson's first animated appearance; he was voiced by Frank Welker. In the episode "Video-Man", he finds out that Angelica Jones and Firestar are one and the same person. But he is unable to remember that in the end. In "Spider-Man Unmasked", Sandman learns Spider-Man's true identity as Peter Parker and Firestar tricks Flash into wearing a Spider-Man's costume to a party, which successfully mislead Sandman into thinking he made a mistake. In the end, Flash tries to take some credit in Sandman's defeat but Peter throws him some sand, scaring him.

=== Thor ===
Thor appeared in the episode "Vengeance of Loki".

=== X-Men ===
The X-Men guest-starred in several episodes of Spider-Man and His Amazing Friends, starting with a flashback in "The Origin of Iceman" (Iceman himself being one of the show's three main characters). Appearing in this particular episode are Professor X and the five original X-Men: Angel, Beast, Cyclops, Iceman, and Marvel Girl. In the continuity of the show, Firestar was also a former member of the X-Men. X-Men member Sunfire would also pop up on his own in a later episode teaming up with the Amazing Friends.

The X-Men's next appearance was in the episode "A Firestar is Born", including appearances from Professor X, Cyclops, Angel, Wolverine, Storm, and even Juggernaut (plus Magneto and a Sentinel in cameo appearances).

The X-Men would return the following season in the episode entitled "The X-Men Adventure". Making appearances there were: Colossus, Cyclops, Nightcrawler, Professor X, Sprite, Storm, and Thunderbird. "The X-Men Adventure" was meant to be a pilot for an X-Men cartoon that was slated to feature the X-Men characters, plus Lady Lightning (an animated version of Carol Danvers/Ms. Marvel) and Videoman as members. The cartoon was never produced.

==== Angel ====
Angel was shown in two episodes of Spider-Man and His Amazing Friends. He appeared in "The Origin of Iceman" and "A Firestar is Born". He is voiced by William Callaway in "A Firestar is Born". In that episode, he introduces Storm to Iceman and Firestar and helps in the fight against Juggernaut.

==== Beast ====
Beast appeared, alongside the other original X-Men, in the episode called "The Origin of Iceman" of the animated television series Spider-Man and His Amazing Friends. He was seen only in a flashback in his original form and had no lines.

==== Colossus ====
Colossus made his television debut in two episodes of the animated series Spider-Man and His Amazing Friends. He appeared in the episodes "The Education of a Superhero" and "The X-Men Adventure". Speaking only in his second appearance, he was voiced by John Stephenson.

==== Cyclops ====
Cyclops appeared in several episodes of the animated television series Spider-Man and His Amazing Friends. He appears in the episodes, "The Origin of Iceman", "A Firestar is Born", "The Education of a Superhero", and "The X-Men Adventure". George DiCenzo provided Cyclops' voice in "The X-Men Adventure" while Neil Ross provided Cyclops' voice in "A Firestar is Born".

==== Marvel Girl ====
Marvel Girl appears in a flashback in the episode,"The Origin of Iceman".

==== Nightcrawler ====
In the 1980s animated series Spider-Man and His Amazing Friends, Nightcrawler is among the X-Men who guest-star in the episodes "The X-Men Adventure" and "The Education of a Superhero". He was voiced by Stanley Jones.

==== Sprite ====
Shadowcat appeared as Sprite in the episode "The X-Men Adventure", voiced by Sally Julian. She also appeared in her short-lived "Ariel" costume in the X-Men group cameo at the end of "The Education of a Superhero".

==== Storm ====
Storm made guest appearances in the episodes "A Firestar Is Born", "The Education of a Superhero", and "The X-Men Adventure". She was voiced by Kathy Garver in "The X-Men Adventure" and Annie Lockhart in "A Firestar Is Born".

==== Thunderbird ====
Thunderbird appears in the episode "The X-Men Adventure", voiced by John Stephenson. He is shown as a member of the X-Men. In this incarnation, he possesses the ability to transform into a variety of North American animals, akin to Alpha Flight's Snowbird.

==== Videoman ====
In Season 3, Francis Byte is an avid videogame player who is especially engrossed into gaining the high score on "Zellman Command" at the local arcade. However, when the Gamesman sends a hypnotic signal that entrances over 300,000 people in the city (with the exception of Francis' girlfriend Louise, Spider-Man and Firestar), the signal does not affect Francis' mind, which is distracted from entrancement by Louise and the game; after Louise walks away after having her pleas being shrugged off by Francis, he (unbeknownst to any others) plays the arcade machine so hard that it and other arcade machines (most of which are emitting the hypnotic waves) explode. The explosion causes Francis to be turned into Videoman. Finding out that he can turn into his new alter-ego at will, Videoman, however, is completely inexperienced with his handling of such powerful abilities; he tries to help the trio (which has awakened Iceman from his trance) against a hypnotized mob, but they repel his offers due to his inexperience. He then tries to save Louise from the Gamesman, but is then easily bribed into manipulating a military weapons calculation system in return for Louise's freedom, an offer that is then reneged upon by the Gamesman. Enraged at the trickery, Videoman helps Spider-Man and the others to free Louise and also reverses his stoppage of the military computer. After the Gamesman is defeated, Francis accepts an invitation to join the X-Men, while Louise accepts him and his abilities. This is the last appearance of Videoman in the series.

==== Wolverine ====
Wolverine appears alongside the other X-Men in the episode "A Firestar Is Born" of the animated series, Spider-Man and His Amazing Friends, played by voice-actor Neil Ross.

==== Professor X ====
Xavier makes frequent guest appearances on the animated series Spider-Man and His Amazing Friends, voiced by Stan Jones.

== Villains ==
=== Advanced Idea Mechanics ===
Although unnamed, some A.I.M. agents made a cameo in the episode "The X-Men Adventure".

=== Beetle ===
The Beetle is voiced by Christopher Collins. He stole a crime-detection computer and the Power Booster invented by Tony Stark to increase his power. He was the first villain that the Spider-Friends faced together in that origin episode.

=== Brotherhood of Mutants ===
The Brotherhood appear in the episode "The Prison Plot", consisting of Magneto, Toad, Blob, and Mastermind. The Spider-Friends are called into action when Magneto appears demanding the release of the Brotherhood from jail.

=== Burglar ===
The Burglar appeared in a flashback in the Spider-Man and His Amazing Friends, voiced by John Stephenson.

=== Chameleon ===
The Chameleon was the featured villain in the episode "Seven Little Superheroes", voiced by Hans Conried. He lured Spider-Man, Iceman, Firestar, Captain America, Doctor Strange, Sub-Mariner and Shanna the She-Devil (referred to as "Shanna of the Jungle") to the remote Wolf Island to pick them off one by one.

=== Doctor Doom ===
Dr. Doom's final 1980s animated appearance was in Spider-Man and His Amazing Friends, voiced by Shepard Menkin. He appeared in an episode entitled "The Fantastic Mr. Frump!"

=== Dracula ===
He appeared in the episode "The Transylvania Connection", voiced by Stan Jones.

=== Electro ===
Electro was the main villain in the episode "Videoman", voiced by Allan Melvin. He later made a cameo appearance in "Attack of the Arachnoid".

==== Videoman ====
In Season 1, Videoman first appeared as a creature, created by Electro. Its abilities include moving through and manipulating electronic circuits, and Videoman is used by Electro to suck in and entrap Spider-Man, Flash Thompson, Firestar and Iceman into a video game display where Electro attempts to destroy the four. However, Flash is able to save himself and the others by escaping through the monitor and into Electro's electronic components to save the others. This first villainous version of Videoman makes one other appearance in Season 2's episode "Origin of Ice-Man".

=== Doctor Faustus ===
Doctor Faustus appeared on the episode "Pawns of the Kingpin", voiced by Dennis Marks. He is employed by Wilson Fisk to construct the Psycho Disk and use it to brainwash Captain America and Iceman.

=== Green Goblin ===
Green Goblin, voiced by Dennis Marks, is depicted as something closer to the Lizard, with a serious medical problem of physically and uncontrollably changing into the Green Goblin. This version of the character has a niece by the name of Mona Osborn, who had no knowledge of her uncle's double identity. When she was held captive by the Green Goblin, she stated that he looked familiar. He appears in the episodes "The Triumph of the Green Goblin" and "The Quest of the Red Skull".

=== Juggernaut ===
Juggernaut appeared on Spider-Man and His Amazing Friends, voiced by William Marshall.

=== Kingpin ===
Kingpin appeared in the episode "Pawns of the Kingpin", voiced by Walker Edmiston. In that episode, he brainwashes Captain America, who then tricks Iceman so both heroes would steal a secret weapon for him. The scientist who developed the brainwashing technique betrays the Kingpin by brainwashing him but the Kingpin eventually reveals that he had already taken precautions and had just pretended to be brainwashed waiting for a chance to capture the scientist. He's eventually captured.

=== Kraven the Hunter ===
Kraven appears in the episode "The Crime Of All Centuries", voiced by George DiCenzo. He manages to bring the dinosaurs he caught from the Savage Land to Manhattan to prove the existence of the Savage Land. Kraven later captures Firestar so that he can use her powers to power up a machine that will hatch his dinosaur army.

=== Loki ===
Loki appears in the episode "The Vengeance of Loki", voiced by John Stephenson.

=== Mordred ===
Mordred appeared in the episode "Knights and Demons", voiced by John Stephenson.

=== Mysterio ===
He made an appearance in the episode "Spidey Goes Hollywood", voiced by Peter Cullen. He blackmails a director to persuade Spider-Man to star in a movie, rigged with devices he created.

=== Doctor Octopus ===
Michael Bell reprises his role of Doctor Octopus from the 1982 Incredible Hulk animated series, in the episode "Spidey Meets the Girl of Tomorrow". He plots to steal a time machine from two siblings from the future.

=== Red Skull ===
Peter Cullen reprises his role of Red Skull from the 1981 solo Spider-Man animated series in the episode "Quest of the Red Skull". He attempts to start World War III.

=== Sandman ===
Sandman appears in the episode "Spider-Man: Unmasked!", voiced by Chris Latta.

=== Scorpion ===
Scorpion appears in the episode "Attack of the Arachnoid", voiced by Neil Ross. He was thwarted by the Spider-Friends at the beginning of the episode. When Spider-Man ends up in jail for Zolton's actions to frame the real Spider-Man, Scorpion took this opportunity to deliver payback to Spider-Man only to be defeated.

=== Sentinel ===
A Sentinel appeared in a flashback of the episode "A Firestar Is Born".

=== Shocker ===
Shocker appeared in the episode "Along Came a Spidey", voiced by John Stephenson.

=== Swarm ===
In an episode (entitled "Swarm") of the 1980s cartoon, Spider-Man and His Amazing Friends, The Swarm (voiced by Al Fann) was created when alien energy from a fallen meteorite irradiated a nearby beehive, giving it sentience and the ability to use eye blasts to increase the size of bees and their hive or mutate people into bee drone hybrids. The Swarm was defeated when Spider-Man (who was immune to the mutation due to his radioactive blood), Firestar, and Iceman launched the meteorite back into space. Distancing the bees and hybrids from the meteor's radiation reversed all of The Swarm's effects.

=== Ymir ===
Ymir appeared in the episode "The Vengeance of Loki", voiced by John Stephenson. He has taken over the kingdom that was ruled by the Ice Giant Zerona. With the help of Iceman, she was able to drive him away.
