= List of The Incredible Hulk characters =

The following is an overview of the characters depicted in The Incredible Hulk, a 1982 animated television series.

== Bruce Banner/Hulk ==
After the live-action series ended in 1982, the Hulk returned to cartoon format with 13 episodes of The Incredible Hulk, which aired in a combined hour with Spider-Man and His Amazing Friends. The series featured more characters from the comics than the live-action series, including Rick Jones, Betty Ross, and Thunderbolt Ross. The She-Hulk and Leader made an appearance in the show. This series also featured Stan Lee as a narrator. Bruce Banner was voiced by Michael Bell, while the Hulk was voiced by Bob Holt.

== Supporting characters ==
=== Rick Jones ===
Rick was a regular character in The Incredible Hulk, voiced by Michael Horton. In this version, Rick was blond, wore a cowboy hat, and had a girlfriend named Rita.

=== Rio and Rita ===
Also introduced were the Hispanic family of Rio and his daughter Rita, the father and his efforts to advertise his restaurant (Rio's Rancheros) providing more chances for comic relief and Rita providing a love interest for Rick Jones.

=== Betty Ross ===
In this incarnation, Betty (voiced by B.J. Ward) is a research scientist working alongside Bruce Banner at Gamma Base, and is unaware (as are most of the series regulars, other than Rick Jones) that Banner transforms into the Hulk.

=== She-Hulk ===
She-Hulk appeared in the 1982 animated The Incredible Hulk series broadcast on NBC, voiced by Victoria Carroll. The eleventh episode is entitled "Enter: She-Hulk" and covers She-Hulk's origin (an emergency blood transfusion), which had Bruce Banner seeking She-Hulk's help in retaining his mind when he transforms into the Hulk. This She-Hulk is based upon her depiction in the Savage She-Hulk comic.

== Villains ==
=== Hydra ===
In The Incredible Hulk episode "Enter: She-Hulk," Hulk and She-Hulk battle Hydra's forces. The Supreme Hydra featured was Steve Perry.

=== Doctor Octopus ===
Doctor Octopus was a guest villain in the episode "Tomb of the Unknown Hulk" voiced by Michael Bell. Doctor Octopus had stolen a rocket ship in the military camp.

=== Leader ===
The Leader appeared in the episode "Punks on Wheels" voiced by Stan Jones.

=== Puppet Master ===
The Puppet Master appeared in the episode "Bruce Banner: Unmasked" voiced by Bob Holt. He gets control of the residents in Mesa City while also attempting to control the Hulk (his Hulk 'doll' even allows him to exert some slight influence over Bruce Banner, although Banner simply feels uncomfortable rather than falling under the Puppet Master's control) simultaneously causing the Hulk's true identity to be revealed. The only person he doesn't make a puppet of is his stepdaughter Alicia, which allows Bruce and Rick Jones to track him down, Rick subsequently using the Puppet Master's equipment to erase all memory of the Hulk's true identity prior to its destruction.

=== Thunderbolt Ross ===
General Thunderbolt Ross appears in The Incredible Hulk voiced by Robert Ridgely.

=== Spymaster ===
Spymaster appeared in The Incredible Hulk episode "Prisoner of the Monster." He was named as such, but did not wear a costume of any type.

=== Glenn Talbot ===
Glenn Talbot appeared in the 1980s Incredible Hulk animated television series voiced by Pat Fraley. In this version, Talbot's first name was changed from Glenn to "Ned". He was nicknamed by the troops secretly as "Noodle-head Ned" because he was very clumsy, was somewhat cowardly, he sucked up to General Ross, and is often deceived by the enemy.
