= The Marvel Action Hour =

Syndicated programming block

Marvel Action Universe
- The Marvel Action Hour
- Network: Syndication (U.S.)
- Launched: September 24, 1994
- Closed: February 24, 1996
- Country of origin: United States
- Owner: Genesis Entertainment
- Formerly known as: The Marvel Action Hour
- Format: Animated series
- Running time: 60 minutes late 1994 and 1995: 90 minutes
- Original language: English

The Marvel Action Hour, later Marvel Action Universe, was a 1994–1996 syndicated television block from Genesis Entertainment featuring animated adaptations of Marvel Comics superheroes Fantastic Four and Iron Man, with Biker Mice from Mars added for the block's second season. It aired in syndication for two years before being cancelled.

== Format ==
The first half of the hour was an episode of Iron Man; the second half, an episode of Fantastic Four. During the first season, Stan Lee introduced the episode.

Both the Fantastic Four and Iron Man were radically retooled for the second seasons, sporting new opening sequences, improved animation, and more mature writing, though the introductions by Stan Lee were shortened and now against a green screen displaying various production paintings from both shows.

In most markets, the second season was known as Marvel Action Universe, which was the name of a previous syndicated programming block in the late 1980s, with the addition of Biker Mice from Mars extending the block to 90 minutes. The structure was like this: there was a pre-opening overview of the each respective series, then the Marvel Action Universe opening, then the Stan Lee intro, then the episode prologue, then the regular show opening, and finally the episode.

=== UK modification ===
The show underwent a notable modification when broadcast on the BBC in the United Kingdom; because the BBC does not feature commercial breaks, the two shows that made up the Marvel Action Hour would actually only have totaled about forty minutes, and so episodes of the 1980s Incredible Hulk series were added between the two original shows to bring the whole bundle up to the promised hour in length. The Stan Lee segments were, however, dropped. First series was broadcast from 20 April until 22 June 1996 with 3 further episodes in late August and early September. The series was repeated in 1997 and 1998; however, the BBC did not screen Marvel Action Universe, due to the fact Channel 4 held the UK rights to Biker Mice from Mars.

== Series overview programme ==
- Iron Man and Fantastic Four (September 24, 1994 – February 24, 1996)
- Biker Mice from Mars from the second season.

=== CBBC Animated Series overview programme ===
- Incredible Hulk (September 18, 1982 – October 8, 1983) was added into the programme.

== Stations ==
Generally, New World owned television stations broadcast The Marvel Action Hour along with generally Fox, The WB, UPN, or independent stations in markets where New World did not own a station.

City	Station
Albany GA	WFXL 31 (Fox)
Albany NY	WXXA 23 (Fox)
Atlanta	WAGA 5 (Fox); WUPA 69 (UPN)
Austin	KXAN 36 (NBC)
Baltimore	WBFF 45 (Fox)
Baton Rouge	WGMB 44 (Fox)
Bellingham	KVOS 12 (Ind)
Birmingham	WDBB 17 (Fox)
Boston	WSBK 38 (UPN)
Buffalo	WKBW 7 (ABC)
Charleston	WTAT 24 (Fox)
Charlotte	WJZY 46 (UPN)
Chicago	WPWR 50 (UPN)
Cleveland	WJW 8 (Fox)
Cincinnati	WSTR 64 (UPN)
Columbus	WSYX 6 (ABC); WWHO 53 (UPN)
Dayton	WKEF 22 (NBC)
Detroit	WJBK 2 (Fox)
Fort Worth/Dallas	KTXA 21 (UPN); KDFW 4 (Fox)
Hartford	WFSB 3 (CBS)
Houston	KTXH 20 (UPN)
Goldsboro/Raleigh	WNCN 17 (WB)
Greensboro/High Point/Winston-Salem	WGHP 8 (Fox)
Greeneville/Bristol	WEMT 39 (Fox)
Jacksonville	WBSG 21 (WB)
Kansas City	KSMO 62 (UPN)
Los Angeles	KTLA 5 (WB)
Miami	WDZL 39 (WB)
Milwaukee	WITI 6 (Fox)
New York	WPIX 11 (WB)
Oklahoma City	KOCB 34 (WB)
Orlando	WKCF 18 (WB)
Philadelphia	WPHL 17 (WB)
Phoenix	KSAZ 10 (Fox)
Pittsburgh	KDKA 2 (CBS)
Portland	KPTV 12 (UPN)
Rochester	WROC 8 (CBS)
Sacramento	KPWB 31 (WB)
San Diego	KNSD 39 (NBC)
San Francisco	KBHK-TV 44 (UPN)
Seattle	KTZZ 22 (WB)
St. Louis	KTVI 2 (Fox)
St. Petersburg/Tampa	WTVT 13 (Fox); WTTA 38 (Ind)
Washington, D.C.	WBDC 50 (WB)
West Palm Beach	WTVX 34 (UPN)
Yakima	KCYU 68 (Fox)

== See also ==
- Spider-Man (1994 TV series)
- The Incredible Hulk (1996 TV series)
- X-Men (TV series)
