= Second Effort =

- Cover of Second Effort video
- Directed by: Jay Sheridan
- Written by: David Hayes
- Starring: Vince Lombardi, Ron Masak
- Production company: Dartnell Training Programmes
- Release date: 1968
- Running time: 30 minutes
- Country: United States
- Language: English

Second Effort is a 1968 sales training film starring Vince Lombardi, the Hall of Fame head coach of the Green Bay Packers. The film also featured veteran character actor Ron Masak and other members of the Green Bay Packers organization, including offensive lineman Jerry Kramer. It has been cited as a "classic" and as the best-selling training film of all time. The film is still in use in leadership and management courses.

== Plot ==
The plot of the film centers around a salesman named Ron (portrayed by Ron Masak) who is trying to make a sales pitch to legendary NFL coach Vince Lombardi. Ron is not very good at his job, and fumbles ineffectually through his sales pitch. Coach Lombardi takes pity on him, and spends the rest of the film teaching him his personal philosophy, known as "The Second Effort". The sport of American football is used as a metaphor, and lessons on the football field are applied to Ron's own job in sales. Many quotes and aphorisms commonly associated with Lombardi appear in the film, such as "mental toughness is the essential key to success" and "confidence is contagious, and so is the lack of it". Scenes take place in Lombardi's office and other locations around Lambeau Field, the Packers home football stadium.

The film was designed to train and motivate salesmen. The industry that Ron, the salesman in the film, represents is intentionally left vague, so as to broaden the appeal of the film. It has been used by companies in many industries to train their sales force; it has also been used in other settings as a motivational film.

== Reception ==
Numerous sources have cited this as the bestselling film of its type.

The film became something of signature film in sales training and corporate motivation, so much so that in 1969, one salesman complained of having been shown the film by his boss twelve times in one year. One reviewer in the Chicago Tribune thought that Lombardi's performance "[rated] an Oscar for his role" in the film. The film itself has been the subject of an episode of the NFL Films Presents television show, host Steve Sabol interviewed Ron Masak on the making of the film and on his memories of working with Vince Lombardi.

Second Effort was an international success as well. People who otherwise were unfamiliar with the sport of American football became fans of it. Australian former rugby league footballer Terry Fearnley was "mesmerized" by Second Effort after being shown the film as part of a corporate conference held by General Motors Holden. He recommended the film to his friend, legendary rugby league coach Jack Gibson. Gibson promptly cancelled a day of practices to show it to his team; they would go unbeaten for the next seven weeks. Inspired by Lombardi and the film, Fearnley and Gibson would travel to the U.S. to study under American football coaches, and would bring back training techniques that would revolutionize rugby league in Australia.

By 1988, twenty years after the film was released, Second Effort had sold 50,000 copies. This is an astoundingly high number for a short training film, a genre where even 1,000 copies is considered successful. Producers of training films have called it "a classic" and "an amazing film" and have cited it as the benchmark film of the industry.

== See also ==
- List of American films of 1968
