= Spider-Man and His Amazing Friends =

American superhero animated TV series

- Genre: Superhero; Action; Adventure
- Created by: Stan Lee
- Based on: Spider-Man by: Stan Lee; Steve Ditko
- Directed by: Don Jurwich
- Voices of: Dan Gilvezan; Frank Welker; Kathy Garver; June Foray
- Narrated by: Dick Tufeld; (season 1); Stan Lee; (seasons 2–3)
- Composer: Johnny Douglas
- Country of origin: United States
- Original language: English
- No. of seasons: 3
- No. of episodes: 24

Production
- Executive producers: David H. DePatie; Lee Gunther
- Producer: Dennis Marks
- Running time: 25 minutes
- Production company: Marvel Productions

Original release
- Network: NBC
- Release: September 12, 1981 – November 5, 1983

Related
- Spider-Man (1981 TV series); Spider-Man (1994 TV series)

Spider-Man and His Amazing Friends is a 1981–1983 American superhero animated television series produced by Marvel Productions, and a crossover with the 1981 Spider-Man series. In addition to the established Marvel Comics characters Spider-Man and Iceman, the show introduced the principal character Fire-Star. As a trio called the Spider-Friends, they defeat various villains of the Marvel Universe.

== Production ==
The series was an attempt by NBC to replicate some of the success ABC enjoyed with the Super Friends franchise. The makers of the show intended the stars to be Spider-Man, Iceman, and the Human Torch. However, legal issues about the rights to the Human Torch character (which had also plagued Marvel once before for the 1978 Fantastic Four cartoon) led to the Human Torch being replaced by the new character Fire-Star, who had similar powers, but was a mutant like Iceman. The Fire-Star character's name changed frequently during pre-production, including Firefly, Starblaze, and Heatwave. Due to the character's popularity, Firestar (without the hyphen) was subsequently added to the mainstream Marvel Universe.

Marvel Comics maintained a high level of creative control over the series, with Stan Lee (co-creator of both Spider-Man and Iceman) working with the screenwriters and involving himself in the casting and animation.

Some of the sound effects used in the series originated from Universal Television's Battlestar Galactica and Buck Rogers in the 25th Century. Adding Ms. Lion, a pet, as a character was another attempt to emulate the Super Friends (specifically the characters Wonder Dog and Gleek).

Fire-Star actress Kathy Garver recalled that though the storyboards for each episode were completed before the voices were recorded for it, "... we really just worked from script. We'd do a roundtable to get the feeling of how the show was going, and then we would record".

== Broadcast schedule ==
Originally broadcast on NBC as a Saturday morning cartoon, the series ran first-run original episodes for three seasons, from 1981 to 1983, then aired repeats for an additional two years (from 1984 to 1986). Alongside the 1981 Spider-Man animated series, Amazing Friends was later re-aired in the late 1980s as part of the 90-minute Marvel Action Universe, a syndicated series that was used as a platform for old and new Marvel-produced animated fare (the newer programming featured RoboCop: The Animated Series, Dino-Riders and on occasion X-Men: Pryde of the X-Men, which was a pilot for a potential X-Men animated series). Mihahn and Toei Animation contributed some of the animation for this series.

=== Season changes ===
During the first season, each episode contained a cold open, which was and remains unusual for a children's cartoon. When the same episodes were re-aired later in the series' run, these teaser sequences were edited to fit after the titles and episode card. Still, the original sequence infrequently showed up on NBC's re-airings. Stan Lee did not originally narrate the episodes from this season.

In the second season, the show aired along with a newly produced Hulk animated series as The Incredible Hulk and the Amazing Spider-Man. The two shows shared one intro which showcased the new title. In place of the cold opens from the first season, Marvel Productions created 12-second previews aired immediately preceding the episodes. Stan Lee began narrating the episodes in the second season. Marvel Productions also added narrations by Lee to the first-season episodes at this time to give the series cohesion. Neither first nor second season narrations appear on the current masters, and they have not aired since the NBC airings (as seen on the Stan Lee narration list at Spider-Friends.com).

For the third season, the characters' billing was reversed and the show was called, The Amazing Spider-Man and the Incredible Hulk. It remained that way for most of the remaining years. NBC did air the show individually in mid-season (post 1986) after it was not initially announced for their fall schedule. Only some of the Stan Lee narrations for the third season are on the current masters. The missing narrations have not aired since the NBC airings.

== Storyline ==
Peter Parker (Spider-Man), Bobby Drake (Iceman), and Angelica Jones (Fire-Star) are all college students at Empire State University. After working together to defeat the Beetle and recovering the "Power Booster" he stole from Tony Stark (a.k.a. Iron Man) the trio decide to team-up permanently as the "Spider-Friends". They live together at Aunt May's home with her pet dog named Ms. Lion, a Lhasa Apso who was adopted by Fire-Star. Together, the superheroes battle various supervillains.

Some stories featured team-ups with other superheroes including but not limited to Captain America, Doctor Strange, Thor, Sunfire, and the mid-1970s X-Men.

== Original characters ==
A number of characters were original to the series, with no comic appearance prior to the series premiere.

=== Fire-Star ===
One of the principal characters, Fire-Star was created specifically for this series when the Human Torch was unavailable (due to licensing issues). The original plan was for Spider-Man to have fire and ice based teammates, so Angelica Jones/Fire-Star was created. Her pre-production names included Heatwave, Firefly, (both having already been names of DC Comics villains), and Starblaze.

Firestar did not appear in Marvel's mainstream comic book universe until Uncanny X-Men #193 (May 1985). She appears as a member of the Hellions, a group of teenage mutants who functioned as rivals to the New Mutants (a similar group under the tutelage of Charles Xavier). After leaving the Hellions, Firestar becomes a founding member of the New Warriors and later serves as a distinguished member of the Avengers along with her fellow New Warrior, Justice. She is currently a member of the X-Men.

=== Hiawatha Smith ===
Hiawatha Smith is a college professor at the Spider-Friends' university. He is the son of a heroic Native American chief who fought against the Axis during World War II.

Hiawatha Smith's home is adorned with decorations from various cultures including Hindu and native African tribes. Producer and story editor Dennis Marks created the character and admits to basing him on Indiana Jones.

Smith's father passed down to his son the mystic knowledge of their people and a map leading to a vast Nazi treasure of wealth and advanced technology sought by the Red Skull. Smith often employs a boomerang in battle. He possesses a supernatural ability to communicate with animals.

=== Lightwave ===
Iceman and his sister Lightwave

Lightwave's real name is Aurora Dante. Like her older half-brother Bobby Drake (a.k.a. the superhero Iceman), Lightwave is a mutant. She can manipulate and control light. Her other light-based powers include laser blasts, photonic force fields and solid light pressor beams. She can also transform herself into light; in such a form, she is able to exist in the vacuum of outer space.

Lightwave's only appearance was in "Save the Guardstar", the final episode of the 1980s cartoon. She is voiced by Annie Lockhart. Bobby Drake explains that they share the same mother.

An agent of S.H.I.E.L.D., Lightwave is considered a traitor, due to mind control by rogue S.H.I.E.L.D. agent Buzz Mason. Mason induces Lightwave to steal assorted devices to create a "quantum enhancer" which would increase her powers 1,000 times. With such power, Lightwave would be able to control the Guardstar satellite which orbits the Earth and controls all defense systems and communications systems for the United States. Mason expects world conquest since he controls Lightwave.

Iceman, Fire-Star, and Spider-Man attempt to stop Lightwave. However, she is powerful enough to defeat them. Aboard a space vessel, Buzz Mason forces Iceman into outer space, dooming Iceman if he remains there for long. Spider-Man convinces Lightwave to realize that the half-brother she loves is in mortal danger. Her reaction breaks Mason's control over her, and she saves Iceman and disables Mason long enough for Spider-Man to subdue him.

Presumably, with Mason's role realized, S.H.I.E.L.D. restores Lightwave's good standing. As this is Lightwave's only appearance, her fate is unknown.

=== Videoman ===
Videoman is an intangible two-dimensional being with lightning bolt-shaped horns that is mostly composed of electronic data gleaned from a video arcade. Videoman makes three appearances in the series where there are two versions of him.

==== As a villain ====
In Season 1, Videoman first appeared as an angular humanoid energy construct created by Electro. Its abilities include moving through and manipulating electronic circuits and projecting rectangular pulses of energy. Videoman is used by Electro to suck in and entrap Spider-Man, Flash Thompson, Fire-Star, and Iceman into a video game display where Electro attempts to destroy the four. However, Flash is able to save himself and the others by escaping through the monitor and into Electro's electronic components to save the others.

This first villainous version of Videoman makes one other appearance in Season 2's "Origin of Ice-Man", with the additional abilities of bringing video game characters to life and draining the unique bio-energy of mutants, temporarily suppressing Iceman's powers and weakening Fire-Star, as well as being able to emulate their powers for its own use. This time, Videoman is defeated when the Spider-Friends trick it and its video game minions into attacking one another.

==== As a superhero ====
In the Season 3 episode "The Education of a Superhero", nerdy Francis Byte is an avid video game player who is especially engrossed into gaining the high score on a game called Zellman Comman at the local arcade. The villain Gamesman sends a hypnotic signal that entrances over 300,000 people in the city. This does not affect Francis' girlfriend Louise, Spider-Man, and Fire-Star, nor does the signal affect Francis' mind, which is distracted from entrancement by Louise and the game. Louise walks away from Francis, then also gets affected and hypnotized after having her pleas disregarded by Francis. He (unbeknownst to any others) plays the arcade machine so rigorously that it and other arcade machines (most of which are emitting the hypnotic waves) explode. The explosion transforms Francis into Videoman.

Francis discovers that he can become his new blue and white, red-eyed alter-ego Videoman at will. However, he is inexperienced with handling such powerful abilities. He tries to help the trio (which has awakened Iceman from his trance) against a hypnotized mob, but they repel his offers due to his inexperience. He then tries to save Louise from the Gamesman, but he is easily blackmailed into manipulating a military communications satellite system in return for Louise's freedom, an offer that is then reneged upon by the Gamesman. Enraged at the trickery, Videoman helps Spider-Man and the others free Louise and also reverses his stoppage of the military computer. After the Gamesman is defeated, Francis accepts an invitation to join the X-Men, while Louise accepts him and his abilities.

Videoman made a cameo appearance in the 2023 film Spider-Man: Across the Spider-Verse. He is depicted as a prisoner of Miguel O'Hara's Spider-Society among other universe-displaced villains.

== Cast ==
- Hans Conried - Chameleon (in "7 Little Superheroes")
- Jerry Dexter - Sunfire (in "Sunfire")
- George DiCenzo - Captain America (in "7 Little Superheroes" and "Pawns of the Kingpin"), Lance Macho
- Alan Dinehart - Boris (in "The Fantastic Mr. Frump"), Sam Blockbuster (in "Spidey Goes Hollywood"), Helicopter Pilot (in "Triumph of the Green Goblin"), Norman Osborn's Pilot (in "Triumph of the Green Goblin"), Police Officer #2 (in "Triumph of the Green Goblin"), Thief #1 (in "Triumph of the Green Goblin"), Security Guard #1 (in "The Crime of All Centuries")
- Walker Edmiston - Kingpin (in "Pawns of the Kingpin")
- Michael Evans - Professor Wells
- Al Fann - Swarm (in "Swarm")
- June Foray - Aunt May, Crime Computer, Judy
- Kathy Garver - Fire-Star/Angelica Jones, Sally, Storm (in "The X-Men Adventure")
- Dan Gilvezan - Spider-Man/Peter Parker, Zoltan Amadeus/The Arachnoid (in "Attack of the Arachnoid"), Biker Gang Leader (in "The Crime of All Centuries")
- John Haymer - Skelton (in "The Crime of All Centuries"), Security Guard #2 (in "The Crime of All Centuries")
- Sally Julian - Mona Osborn (in "Triumph of the Green Goblin"), Jungle Girl (in "Triumph of the Green Goblin")
- Annie Lockhart - Honey Dove, Storm (in "A Fire-Star is Born")
- Keye Luke - Sunfire's Uncle Genju (in "Sunfire")
- Dennis Marks - Dr. Faustus (in "Pawns of the Kingpin"), Green Goblin/Norman Osborn (in "Triumph of the Green Goblin"), Police Officer #1 (in "Triumph of the Green Goblin"), Thief #2 (in "Triumph of the Green Goblin"), Cyberiad/Nathan Price (in "The X-Men Adventure")
- Alan Melvin - Electro (in "Videoman")
- Shepard Menkin - Doctor Doom (in "The Fantastic Mr. Frump")
- John Stephenson - Colossus (in "The X-Men Adventure"), Eric the Viking (in "The Vengeance of Loki"), Loki (in "The Vengeance of Loki"), Modred the Mystic (in "Knights and Demons"), Shocker (in "Along Came Spidey"), Surtur (in "The Vengeance of Loki"), Thunderbird (in "The X-Men Adventure"), Ymir (in "The Vengeance of Loki")
- Janet Waldo - Shanna the She-Devil (in "7 Little Superheroes"), Zerona (in "The Vengeance of Loki")
- Frank Welker - Iceman/Bobby Drake, Ms. Lion, Flash Thompson, Matt Murdock (in "Attack of the Arachnoid"), Mr. Jones (in "A Fire-Star is Born"), Uncle Ben (in "Along Came Spidey")
- William Woodson - Doctor Strange (in "7 Little Superheroes"), Sub-Mariner (in "7 Little Superheroes"), J. Jonah Jameson (in "Spider-Man Unmasked!")
- Alan Young - Mr. Frump (in "The Fantastic Mr. Frump")

=== Notable guest stars ===
- Michael Ansara - Hiawatha Smith (in "The Quest of the Red Skull")
- Marlene Aragon - Lightwave (in "Mission: Save the Guardstar")
- Michael Bell - Ariel and Bartow's father (in "Spidey Meets the Girl of Tomorrow"), Doctor Octopus (in "Spidey Meets the Girl of Tomorrow")
- Bob Bergen - Bartow (in "Spidey Meets the Girl of Tomorrow")
- Susan Blu - Louise (in "The Education of a Superhero"), Monica (in "Attack of the Arachnoid")
- William Callaway - Angel (in "A Fire-Star is Born"), Wolverine (in "A Fire-Star is Born")
- Cathy Cavadini - Ariel (in "Spidey Meets the Girl of Tomorrow")
- Christopher Collins - Sandman (in "Spider-Man Unmasked!"), Beetle (in "The Origin of the Spider-Friends")
- Peter Cullen - Hulk/Dr. Bruce Banner (in "Spidey Goes Hollywood"), Mysterio (in "Spidey Goes Hollywood"), Red Skull (in "The Quest of the Red Skull")
- Jeff Doucette - Scorpion (in "Attack of the Arachnoid")
- Ron Feinberg - Frankenstein's Monster (in "The Transylvanian Connection")
- Stanley Jones - Professor X, Cyclops (in "A Fire-Star is Born"), Dean Wilmer (in "A Fire-Star is Born"), Dracula (in "The Transylvanian Connection"), Nightcrawler (in "The X-Men Adventure")
- Harvey Korman - Black Knight (in "Knights and Demons")
- Jennifer Kyle - Sprite/Kitty Pryde (in "The X-Men Adventure")
- David Landsberg - Videoman/Francis Byte (in "The Education of a Superhero")
- William Marshall - Juggernaut (in "A Fire-Star is Born"), Tony Stark (in "The Origin of the Spider-Friends")
- Vic Perrin - Thor (in "The Vengeance of Loki!"), Zerona's Soldier (in "The Vengeance of Loki!"), Burglar (in "Along Came Spidey")
- Robert Ridgely - Kraven the Hunter (in "The Crime of All Centuries")
- Neil Ross - Cyclops (in "The X-Men Adventure")
- Michael Rye - Magneto (in "The Prison Plot")
- Steve Schatzberg - Wolf-Thing (in "The Transylvanian Connection")
- Marilyn Schreffler - Bonnie (in "A Fire-Star is Born")

== Crew ==
- Dick Tufeld - Announcer (Season 1)
- William Marshall - Announcer (Season 2)
- Ron Feinberg - Announcer (Season 3)
- Stan Lee - Narrator (Seasons 2 & 3 and added to re-reruns of Season 1)
- Alan Dinehart - Voice Director

== Episodes ==
Season	Episodes	Originally released	
Season	Episodes	First released	Last released
1	13	September 12, 1981	December 5, 1981
2	3	September 18, 1982	October 2, 1982
3	8	September 17, 1983	November 5, 1983

=== Season 1 (1981) ===
No. overall	No. in season	Title	Written by	Original release date
1	1	"Triumph of the Green Goblin"	Dennis Marks	September 12, 1981
A plane crash turns Norman Osborn back into the Green Goblin, who plans to turn the entire city into goblins. Villain: Norman Osborn/Green Goblin
2	2	"The Crime of All Centuries"	Donald F. Glut	September 19, 1981
Kraven the Hunter plans to unleash a dinosaur army from the dinosaurs he obtained from the Savage Land. To make matters worse, Kraven also captures Fire-Star to help hatch his dinosaur eggs. Villain: Kraven the Hunter
3	3	"The Fantastic Mr. Frump!"	Christy Marx	September 26, 1981
Aunt May's unlucky friend Mr. Frump is given the power to change reality which Doctor Doom uses to his advantage. Villain: Doctor Doom
4	4	"Sunfire"	Christy Marx	October 3, 1981
Fire-Star falls in love with Sunfire as his uncle Genju plans to hatch a fire monster. Villain(s): Genju, Fire Monster
5	5	"Swarm"	Dennis Marks	October 10, 1981
An irradiated meteor turns a group of bees into the villain Swarm, who turns Iceman, Fire-Star, and the rest of the city into bees. Only Spider-Man is immune. Can he find a way to stop Swarm from taking over the world? Villain: Swarm
6	6	"7 Little Superheroes"	Doug Booth	October 17, 1981
Chameleon schemes to destroy his most hated enemies: the Spider-Friends, Captain America, Doctor Strange, Sub-Mariner and Shanna the Jungle Queen, by summoning them to his castle on Wolf Island and taking them down one by one. Note: Shanna the Jungle Queen is renamed from Shanna the She-Devil to avoid references to devils. Villain: Chameleon
7	7	"Video-Man"	Christy Marx	October 24, 1981
Electro creates a villain called Videoman from an arcade machine. Villain(s): Electro, Videoman
8	8	"The Prison Plot"	Francis Feighan; Jack Hanrahan	October 31, 1981
Magneto holds the visitors of an abandoned prison hostage, demanding the release of his Brotherhood of Mutants (consisting of Blob, Toad, and Mastermind). Villain(s): Magneto, Blob, Toad, and Mastermind
9	9	"Spidey Goes Hollywood"	Christy Marx	November 7, 1981
Mysterio forces a movie director named Sam Blockbuster to con Spider-Man into starring in a Spider-Man movie. Bruce Banner appears and ends up turning into the Hulk when it comes to a part where Mysterio uses a robot version of Hulk in a scene. Villain: Mysterio
10	10	"The Vengeance of Loki!"	Donald F. Glut	November 14, 1981
Loki masquerades as his half-brother Thor, and attacks New York City. When Iceman is sent to Asgard, he is saved from Surtur by the Ice Giant Zerona who Iceman helps in fighting off Ymir. Villains: Loki, Surtur, Ymir
11	11	"Knights and Demons"	Donald F. Glut	November 21, 1981
Spider-Man and Black Knight team up to battle Mordred. Villain: Mordred
12	12	"Pawns of the Kingpin"	Donald F. Glut	November 28, 1981
Kingpin and Doctor Faustus use a mind control device to force Captain America to commit crimes, who convinces Iceman to follow him. Villain(s): Kingpin, Doctor Faustus
13	13	"The Quest of the Red Skull"	Dennis Marks	December 5, 1981
Red Skull kidnaps Hiawatha Smith and the Spider-Friends so that they will not interfere in his plot to start World War III. Note: This episode is typically not part of any syndicated package due to its direct depictions of Adolf Hitler, the Nazi swastika, and the use of the phrase 'Heil Hitler'. Villain: Red Skull

=== Season 2 (1982) ===
This season features the origins of all three Spider-Friends.

No. overall	No. in season	Title	Written by	Original release date
14	1	"The Origin of the Iceman"	Donald F. Glut	September 18, 1982
Videoman returns, and Iceman retells his origin as he fears he is losing his mutant powers. In a brief flashback clip, Iceman recalls meeting Professor Xavier and the original members of the X-Men (Angel, Beast, Marvel-Girl, Cyclops). Villain: Videoman
15	2	"A Fire-Star Is Born"	Christy Marx	September 25, 1982
Iceman and Fire-Star attend an X-Men reunion featuring Cyclops, Angel, and its latest members Storm and Wolverine (who oddly speaks with an Australian accent). Fire-Star recalls her origins, dealing with a bully named Bonnie, and being recruited into the X-Men where they fought Magneto and a Sentinel. After that, the Juggernaut crashes the party in an effort to destroy his stepbrother Professor X. Villain: Juggernaut
16	3	"Along Came Spidey"	Donald F. Glut	October 2, 1982
Shocker injures Aunt May, and Spider-Man recounts how he acquired his powers and dealing with the burglar who shot Uncle Ben. Villain(s): Shocker, Burglar (flashback) Note: Jointly adapts "Spider-Man No More!" and "Spider-Man!" (Amazing Fantasy #1).

=== Season 3 (1983) ===
No. overall	No. in season	Title	Written by	Original release date
17	1	"Spider-Man Unmasked!"	Michael Reaves	September 17, 1983
Sandman learns that Spider-Man is Peter Parker. Bobby and Angelica figure out how to make his identity a secret again. Villain: Sandman
18	2	"The Bride of Dracula!"	Jack Mendelsohn	September 24, 1983
Fire-Star is kidnapped by Dracula. Spider-Man and Iceman go to Transylvania to rescue her, fighting both a Werewolf and Frankenstein's Monster. Villain: Dracula
19	3	"The Education of a Superhero"	Dennis Marks	October 1, 1983
A game addict is transformed into the new Videoman who decides to be a superhero while the Gamesman seeks world domination by electronically hypnotizing the public. Villain: Gamesman
20	4	"Attack of the Arachnoid"	Michael Reaves	October 8, 1983
After the Spider-Friends thwart Scorpion, a chemical scientist named Zoltan Amadeus recreates Spider-Man's powers with a spider serum. He frames Spider-Man for his crimes which leads to his arrest. Matt Murdock appears as Spider-Man's lawyer. When Spider-Man ends up on Rikers Island, Scorpion stages a jailbreak to take out Spider-Man, but is defeated. After Zoltan mutates into the Arachnoid, Iceman and Fire-Star clear Spider-Man's name by the time he defeats Scorpion and are given the antidote to return Zoltan to normal. Villain(s): Arachnoid, Scorpion
21	5	"The Origin of the Spider-Friends"	Donald Glut	October 15, 1983
Stan Lee narrates how Spider-Man, Iceman, and Fire-Star first teamed-up to fight the Beetle when he targeted Tony Stark's latest invention. Villain: Beetle
22	6	"Spidey Meets the Girl from Tomorrow"	Dennis Marks	October 22, 1983
Spidey falls in love with a stranded girl from the future, a girl named Ariel, whose spaceship has been stolen by Doctor Octopus. After Doctor Octopus is defeated, Iceman and Fire-Star learn that Ariel and her brother Bartow are sick. In the hospital, it is revealed that they lack immune systems. Spider-Man helps them return to the future, but Ariel's and Bartow's father returns Spider-Man to the present because he carries germs from "Old Earth". Villain: Doctor Octopus
23	7	"The X-Men Adventure"	Michael Reaves	October 29, 1983
The Spider-Friends visit the X-Mansion, teaming with the X-Men (Cyclops, Colossus, Storm, Nightcrawler, Thunderbird, Sprite, and Professor X) and battle Cyberiad. He was once Fire-Star's old boyfriend Nathan Price who was changed into a cyborg in an accident caused when A.I.M. agents raided his laboratory. Villain: Cyberiad
24	8	"Mission: Save the Guardstar"	Dennis Marks	November 5, 1983
Buzz Mason of S.H.I.E.L.D. hires the Spider-Friends to stop a mutant named Lightwave, who has the power to control and manipulate light energy. She turns out to be Iceman's younger half-sister, Aurora Dante (who was not mentioned in "The Origin of Ice Man"). Though it is said that she has turned traitor and is targeting the Guardstar satellite, someone is actually mind-controlling her. Villain: Lightwave (mind-controlled by Buzz Mason)

== Release ==
=== Home media ===
No Region 1 or other NTSC release is planned at this time.

==== Region 2 ====
In April 2008, Liberation Entertainment secured the home media rights to select Marvel shows from Jetix Europe in select European territories, including Spider-Man and His Amazing Friends. On November 10, the company released the first season of the series on DVD followed up with a Series 2-3 set and Complete Series DVD sets on November 24. These releases were distributed through Lace International, due to Liberation closing their UK branch a few weeks prior in October. The Liberation releases did not include any of the Stan Lee narrations from the first or second season. Only some of the Stan Lee narrations were in the third season.

Clear Vision later took over European rights and re-released the series on August 2, 2010 (Season 1) and September 6, 2010 (Seasons 2 and 3) in the United Kingdom respectively, with a German release following afterwards. These newer editions have improved image quality and include German dubbing, while removing the 5.1 audio track and English subtitles. A Complete Series release followed on February 11, 2013.

Budget distributor Walk released a small number of DVD releases in the United Kingdom containing two episodes each for sale in Poundland stores in 2013, under the "Treat Size Introduces..." banner.

=== Streaming ===
The series was available for instant streaming via Netflix from 2011 to August 2015. As part of the acquisition of 21st Century Fox by The Walt Disney Company, the copyrights to the New World library were transferred to TFCF America, Inc., a subsidiary of The Walt Disney Company, effective on March 15, 2019. Consequently, the series became available on the Disney+ streaming service, as a part of U.S. launch on November 12, 2019.

==== Censorship ====
The episode "The Quest of the Red Skull" was excluded due to its direct depictions of Adolf Hitler, the Nazi swastika and the phrase 'Heil Hitler'. In 2020, Disney+ placed a warning on the 4th episode (entitled "Sunfire") for a racially insensitive portrayal of Sunfire. In the episode, Sunfire is portrayed as speaking English with a Japanese accent.

== Reception ==
=== Critical response ===
Adam Levine of Looper said: "The mutant duo became a memorable pairing for Spider-Man, and the series has been fondly remembered in the decades since for its quaint stories, colorful villains, light-hearted nature, and iconic introductions by creator Stan Lee. The animation was a step up from previous attempts, even if it was still relatively simplistic, and stories explored more of Peter Parker's personal life than the 1960s series before it". James Whitbrook of Gizmodo ranked 5th in their "Spider-Man's Best Cartoons" list, writing: "The trio had an excellent dynamic that elevated Amazing beyond its sister show, and as campy as it could be, there's a reason why it remains beloved by many".

Olivia Fitzpatrick of Collider ranked Spider-Man and His Amazing Friend 3rd in their "Every 'Spider-Man' Animated Series" list. Jason Serafino of Complex ranked 25th in their "25 Best Animated Comic Book TV Shows Of All Time" list. IGN ranked Spider-Man and His Amazing Friends 59th in their "Top 100 Animated Series" list, stating that "the animation was predictably budget for the time, particularly when viewed in this post-Spectacular Spider-Man world of ours, but it was fun nonetheless".

=== Impact ===
- Scenes from Spider-Man and His Amazing Friends were re-cut, edited, and re-dubbed into comical shorts as part of Disney XD's "Marvel Mash-Up" shorts for their "Marvel Universe on Disney XD" block of programming that includes Ultimate Spider-Man and The Avengers: Earth's Mightiest Heroes where scenes from Spidey and His Amazing Friends were also mixed with some scenes from the 1981 Spider-Man cartoon. The cast consists of Dave Boat as Spider-Man, J. Jonah Jameson, Beetle, Sandman, Norman Osborn, Shocker, Thor, Doctor Strange, Wolverine, Colossus, Sprite, Thunderbird, Red Skull, and Magneto, Tom Kenny as Iceman, Firestar, Aunt May, Green Goblin, Mysterio, Kraven the Hunter, Swarm, Captain America, Professor X, Nightcrawler, and Loki, J. P. Karliak as Black Cat and Bruce Banner, James Arnold Taylor as Chameleon, Captain America, Iron Man, and Cyberiad, Dee Bradley Baker as Lizard, Jeff Bennett as Cyclops and Juggernaut, and Travis Willingham as Storm, Ka-Zar, and Doctor Doom.
- In the 1984 film Missing in Action starring Chuck Norris, the Spider-Man and his Amazing Friends episode "Along Came Spidey" can be seen on a television.
- In her civilian identity, Angelica Jones resembles Peter's girlfriend from the comic books, Mary Jane Watson. This was played up in issues of Spider-Man Loves Mary Jane in which Firestar appeared.

=== Accolades ===
Spider-Man and His Amazing Friends was nominated for Best Children's Television Series at the 1982 Young Artist Awards.

== Comic books ==
=== Adaptation ===
The first comic book that directly referenced the Amazing Friends show was Spider-Man and His Amazing Friends #1 (December 1981), a one-shot that adapted the pilot episode, "The Triumph of the Green Goblin". Though the comic version altered the story to bring it in line with established Marvel Universe continuity (such as making the Green Goblin identity a costume as in the comics, rather than a physical transformation as in the episode), it was not considered part of Marvel continuity. It is the first appearance of Fire-Star in a comics story, though the version of Firestar that exists within Marvel continuity did not appear until Uncanny X-Men #193 (May 1985).

The story was reprinted in England in late 1983 in the weekly Marvel UK title Spider-Man and His Amazing Friends. It was reprinted in the U.S. as Marvel Action Universe #1 (January 1989), released to coincide with the airing of Amazing Friends reruns on the television series of the same name and on the 2017 trade paperback X-Men Origins: Firestar.

In the Marvel mainstream continuity, Spider-Man, Firestar and Iceman have made sporadic team-ups in Amazing X-Men #7 (July 2014) and Iceman #3 (November 2018).

=== Firestar ===
The mainstream Marvel Universe version of Firestar debuted in the pages of Uncanny X-Men #193 as part of Emma Frost's Hellions team. Firestar was given an origin story in a self-titled mini-series (March – June 1986). The character went on to be a founding member of the New Warriors, and later a member of the Avengers.

One change to Firestar from the TV show to the comic books was her powers. In the cartoon, they were fire based. However, Marvel had a number of characters who could control and/or create fire, so they changed her mutant ability to the power to emit and control microwave energy.

=== Amazing Friends 2006 ===
To commemorate the 25th anniversary of the show, Marvel released Spider-Man Family: Amazing Friends #1 on August 9, 2006. The comic starts with an all-new story, "Opposites Attack", which is officially set before Web of Spider-Man #75. After that is a Mini Marvel tale, "Spider-Man And His Amazing ~~Friends~~ Co-Workers" (note that the strikethrough of "Friends" was a deliberate inclusion in the title). Both stories were written by Sean McKeever.

The remainder of the one-shot is composed of reprints of Untold Tales of Spider-Man #2 and Spider-Man 2099 #2.

=== Ultimate Spider-Man ===
An arc in Ultimate Spider-Man is titled "Spider-Man And His Amazing Friends" and issue #118's cover, showing Spider-Man, Iceman, and Firestar, is a homage to the series title screen. Johnny Storm and Kitty Pryde are also said to be members of the team. Instead of Angelica Jones, Firestar is Liz Allan. Since then, in Ultimate Comics: Spider-Man, Spidey, Iceman, and the Human Torch have begun living together at Aunt May's house and have been working as a team as another homage to the series (because Liz, as Firestar, was a member of the X-Men in this continuity; this team roster also reflects the original intent of Amazing Friends to use the Human Torch before licensing issues forced the creation of Firestar).

=== Amazing Friends in-continuity? ===
In 2007's Official Handbook of the Marvel Universe—Spider-Man: Back in Black one-shot, the villain Videoman is given a brief biography from his "retcon" appearance in the Spider-Man Family one-shot. There is also an annotation describing an "Earth 8107", where an alternate reality Videoman was created by Electro to battle that world's Spider-Man. Later, in the same reality, Francis Byte is mutated by an exploding arcade console to become a new Videoman, and later "possibly" join the X-Men.

=== Spider-Verse ===
The Spider-Friends of Earth-1983 (described as a "kinder, gentler than most" world), except for Ms. Lion, are apparently killed by a dimension-hopping Morlun, set on draining the life out of every variation of Spider-Man across the multiverse.

=== Iceman 2018 ===
At the "Street Cart Named Desire Festival", Peter sees Angelica, but does not seem to recognize her when explaining to Mary Jane that she's the only redhead that he's interested in. Bobby and Angelica briefly catch up before returning to their dates which are then interrupted by an ice monster attack. Iceman, Firestar, and Spider-Man suit up and defeat the attacker together. The team-up is called "Iceman and His Amazing Friends" both on the issue's cover and by Iceman in the story. Afterward, the trio chat and Angelica and Bobby commiserate about men on dating apps.
