= Ron Masak =

American actor (1936–2022)

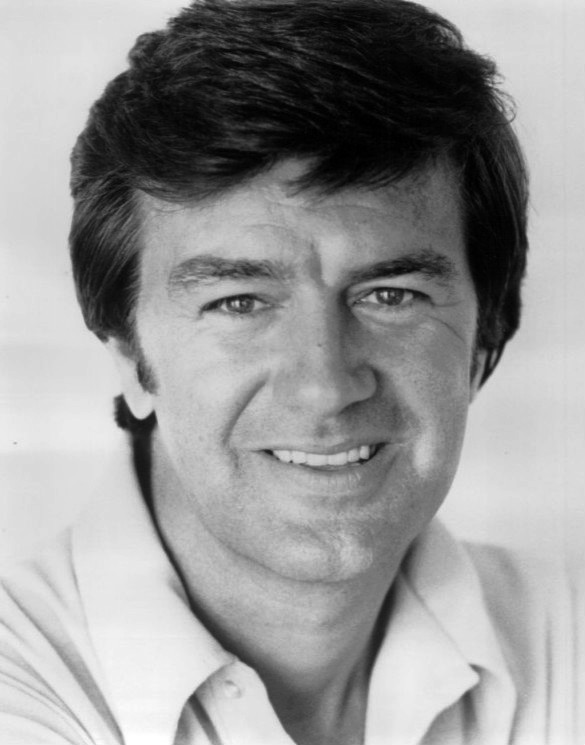
- Masak in 1973
- Born: Ronald Alan Masak; July 1, 1936; Chicago, Illinois, U.S.
- Died: October 20, 2022 (aged 86); Thousand Oaks, California, U.S.
- Occupation: Actor
- Years active: 1959–2022
- Spouse: Kay Knebes (m. 1961)
- Children: 6
- Relatives: Michael Gross (cousin); Mary Gross (cousin)

Ronald Alan Masak (July 1, 1936 – October 20, 2022) was an American actor best known for playing the recurring role of Sheriff Mort Metzger of Cabot Cove in the CBS mystery series Murder, She Wrote. Angela Lansbury, the show's star, predeceased him by nine days. He's also known for his other television roles and his performances in films including Ice Station Zebra (1968), Tora! Tora! Tora! (1970), and Harper Valley PTA (1978).

== Early life ==
Masak was born in Chicago to Floyd Louis Masak and Mildred Alice (Rudy) Masak. His mother was of Irish descent and his father of Czech Bohemian descent. His paternal great-grandfather, Karel Masák (1861-1899), was an immigrant from Zvěrkovice near Týn nad Vltavou.

== Career ==
=== Early career ===
He began working as a stage performer, and mostly was involved in theater until transitioning to film and television becoming a familiar character actor.

The Army provided Masak with a platform to display his all-around talents for performing, writing, and directing. In 1960–61, he toured the world doing vocal impressions in the all-Army show entitled "Rolling Along".

=== Television ===
Masak's early television appearances includes roles on The Twilight Zone, Get Smart, The Monkees, I Dream of Jeannie, Bewitched, and The Mary Tyler Moore Show. From 1970 to 1973 he appeared in the ABC anthology comedy series Love, American Style. He then starred in another ABC series, Love Thy Neighbor (1973). He then earned roles in the NBC crime series Police Story (1975–1978), and in the ABC sitcom Webster (1983–1989).

Masak's first screen role was as the Harmonica Man in "The Purple Testament", an episode of The Twilight Zone in 1960. He appeared as "Mike the boxer" on The Flying Nun, season 1, episode 26 ("Where There's a Will"), which first aired March 13, 1968. He appeared as "Officer #2" on Bewitched, season 7, episode 4 ("Samantha's Hot Bedwarmer"), first aired on October 15, 1970, he also appeared in season 5 episode 25 as an ice cream shop manager which aired in 1969, ("Samantha’s Power Failure"), and as "Irving Bates Sr." in season 6, episode 23 ("Just a Kid Again").

In addition to two guest appearances on the sitcom I Dream of Jeannie, he worked again with "Jeannie" co-star Larry Hagman in an episode of the crime series The Rockford Files.

Masak had a guest appearance as Beauregard Jackson in the episode "Hurricane" on Land of the Lost. He appeared in the second season of Barney Miller episode of "The Horse Thief" as officer Shriker and was a guest star in the "Welcome Home, Vince" episode of The Feather & Father Gang in 1977 and in the episode "The Two-Million-Dollar Stowaway" of The Eddie Capra Mysteries in 1978. In 1981, he guest starred on the Magnum, P.I. episode "Skin Deep". He also guest starred on an episode of Quincy, M.E..

Masak was perhaps best known for a recurring role on Murder, She Wrote as the Cadillac convertible-driving Sheriff, Mort Metzger of Cabot Cove, taking over for Tom Bosley's Sheriff Amos Tupper, a role which he played from 1988 to 1996. Masak did make appearances as two other characters in the series, in "Footnote to Murder" as Lt. Lyle Meyer and in "No Accounting for Murder" as Marty Giles. During this time, he also guest starred on various shows such as The Rockford Files, Quincy, M.E., Magnum, P.I., and Diff'rent Strokes. He died just nine days after the death of the show's main star, Angela Lansbury.

In the 1980s and early 1990s, he was dubbed "The King of Commercials" for his many commercials, including voice-over work, most notably for a Vlasic pickles ad. From 1982 to 1983, he voiced "Meatballs" on the CBS cartoon series Meatballs & Spaghetti. He did the voice for Veteran Holt in the video game Medal of Honor: European Assault.

In 1990, Masak was a panelist on the revival of the television game show, To Tell the Truth, and appeared on several other game shows as a panelist (including Tattletales, Match Game, Password Plus, and Super Password). Masak appeared as Eddie Fenelle, a taxi driver, in the Columbo episode Ashes to Ashes (1998).

=== Film ===
In 1968, he appeared alongside Vince Lombardi in the short film, Second Effort. In the same year he had a supporting role in the submarine action film Ice Station Zebra. He also had a role in the film Harper Valley PTA reuniting with his I Dream of Jeannie co-star Barbara Eden.

== Personal life and death ==
Masak married Kay Knebes in September 1961; together they had six children. He was also the first cousin of actor Michael Gross of Family Ties and former Saturday Night Live cast member Mary Gross.

Masak was honorary sheriff of Tarzana, California, for 35 years.

On October 20, 2022, Masak died of natural causes in a Thousand Oaks hospital, Thousand Oaks, California, at the age of 86 nine days after his former co-star Angela Lansbury.

== Selected filmography ==
Year	Title	Role	Notes
1959	Police Station		TV series
	The Monkees	Count Dracula	S2:E18, "Monstrous Monkee Mash"
1968	Ice Station Zebra	Paul Zabrinczski	
	Second Effort	Ron	
1969	Daddy's Gone A-Hunting	Paul Fleming	Uncredited
1969	A Time for Dying	Sam, the Bartender	
1970	Tora! Tora! Tora!	Lt. Laurence Ruff - USS Nevada	
	Bewitched	Irving Bates, Sr.	S6:E23 "Just a Kid Again"
1971	Evel Knievel	Pete	
1971	The Marriage of a Young Stockbroker	1st Baseball Fan	
1971	Mission: Impossible	Ed Campbell	TV series Episode: Nerves
1971	Assault on the Wayne	CPO Corky Schmidt	ABC Movie of the Week
1974	The Man from Clover Grove	Claude Raintree	
1975	Lucky Lady		Voice
1976	Woman in the Rain		
1978	Laserblast	Sheriff	
1978	Harper Valley PTA	Herbie Maddox	
1978	The Eddie Capra Mysteries	Barney Quinn	Episode: "The Two Million Dollar Stowaway"
1982	The Neighborhood	Nick Riccardo	TV movie
1982	Meatballs & Spaghetti	Meatballs	Animated (Voice)
1983	Heart Like a Wheel	Yankee Announcer Mel Allen	Uncredited
1988-1996	Murder, She Wrote	Sheriff Mort Metzger / Lt. Lyle Meyer / Marty Giles	recurring role; 39 episodes (as the sheriff) + 2 guest-starring episodes as other characters
1985	Diff'rent Strokes	Ray	
1989	Listen to Me	Monica's Father	
1995	Cops n Roberts	Vince Palermo	
1998	Columbo	Eddie Fenelle	Episode "Ashes to Ashes"
1998	No Code of Conduct	Julian Disanto	
2000	The Thundering 8th	Spike Sills	
2002	The Stoneman	Detective Lt. J.D. Hill	
2002	The Making of Bret Michaels	Himself	
2006	The Benchwarmers	Principal	
2008	Cold Case	Gus Medica	S6:E9, "Pin Up Girl"
2014	My Trip Back to the Dark Side	Mr. James Griffin	
