= Morgan Lofting =

American actress (1940–2024)

- Born: February 2, 1940; Cincinnati, Ohio, U.S.
- Died: November 27, 2024 (aged 84); Burbank, California, U.S.
- Occupation: Actress
- Years active: 1979–2014

Morgan Lofting (February 2, 1940 – November 27, 2024) was an American actress best known for her voiceover performance as Baroness in G.I. Joe: A Real American Hero.

Lofting also voiced Aunt May and Black Cat in Spider-Man (1981), Moonracer in The Transformers (1985), and Fistina in Ben 10: Omniverse (2012–2014).

== Early life ==
Lofting was born on February 2, 1940 in Cincinnati, Ohio.

== Death ==
Lofting died in Burbank, California, on November 27, 2024, at the age of 84.

== Filmography ==
=== Film ===
Year	Title	Role	Notes
1982	The Junkman	Police Dispatcher	
1983	The Dragon That Wasn't (Or Was He?)	Mrs. Dickerdack	English version
1983	Joysticks	Mrs. Rutter	
1987	G.I. Joe: The Movie	Baroness	Direct-to-video
1988	The Night Before	Mom	
1990	Total Recall	Additional voices	

=== Television ===
Year	Title	Role	Notes
1979–1984	Star Blazers	Princess Invidia (voice)	
1981–1982	Spider-Man	Aunt May, Black Cat (voice)	26 episodes
1982	Meatballs & Spaghetti	Additional voices	
1983	G.I. Joe: A Real American Hero	Baroness (voice)	Miniseries
1983	Carpool	Evelyn Cook	Television film
1983	The Christmas Tree Train	Bridgette	Television film
1983	Trapper John, M.D.	Mrs. Harper	Episode: "Mother Load"
1984	Amazons	Marge Webster	Television film
1984	G.I. Joe: The Revenge of Cobra	Baroness (voice)	Television film
1984	Finder of Lost Loves	Osborne's Secretary	Episode: "Pilot"
1984	Which Witch Is Which	Bridgette (voice)	Television film
1985	Street Hawk	Judge Hanover	Episode: "The Unsinkable 453"
1985	Button Nose	Countess Upstuck (voice)	English dub
1985	G.I. Joe: A Real American Hero	Baroness	Main role
1985	Command 5	Nancy Danelli	Television film
1985	The Turkey Caper	Bridgette (voice)	Television film
1985	The Transformers	Moonracer (voice)	6 episodes
1985–1986	Action Force	Baroness (voice)	38 episodes
1987	Hotel	Roberta James	1 episode
1986–1987	Knots Landing	Mrs Whitehead	4 episodes
1987	The Judge	June	Episode: "Fetal Abuse"
1986–1988	Jem	Vera, Lexa (voice)	
1989	G.I. Joe: Operation Dragonfire	Baroness (voice)	Miniseries
1990–1991	G.I. Joe: A Real American Hero	Baroness (voice)	
1996	Quack Pack	Tunnel Rat's Mother (voice)	Episode: "Ducky Dearest"
2013–2014	Ben 10: Omniverse	Fistina, Yetta (voice)	4 episodes
