= Meatballs & Spaghetti =

American animated television series (1982–83)

- Created by: Fred Silverman; Jerry Eisenberg
- Written by: Jack Mendelsohn
- Directed by: Bob Richardson (uncredited)
- Voices of: Ron Masak; Sally Julian; Frank Welker; Barry Gordon; Jack Angel; Wally Burr; Philip Clarke; Regis Cordic; Peter Cullen; Ronald Gans; David Hall; Morgan Lofting; Bill Ratner; Ronnie Schell; Marilyn Schreffler; Hal Smith; Paul Winchell
- Composer: Steven DePatie
- Country of origin: United States
- Original language: English
- No. of seasons: 1
- No. of episodes: 13

Production
- Executive producers: Fred Silverman; David H. DePatie
- Producer: Bob Richardson
- Running time: 30 minutes
- Production companies: InterMedia Entertainment Company; Marvel Productions; MGM/UA Television; Pan Sang East Co., Ltd

Original release
- Network: CBS
- Release: September 18, 1982 – March 5, 1983

Related
- Pandamonium

Meatballs & Spaghetti is an American animated television series that aired on CBS on Saturday morning from September 18, 1982, to March 5, 1983. The show was produced by InterMedia Entertainment Company and Marvel Productions and aired on Starcade, CBS's Saturday morning cartoon programming block. It was one of the last Saturday morning cartoon series to be fitted with a laugh track.

The show was not well received, with a Variety review saying, "No try at music here, or even much comedy either. It's without any socially redeeming value."

== Synopsis ==
The series centered on Meatballs & Spaghetti, a husband-and-wife singing duo who roamed the country in a mobile home with their friend Clyde (who was their bassist), and their dog Woofer (who was their drummer). The main characters — fat Meatballs and skinny Spaghetti — were intended to be a mix of popular musicians Meat Loaf and Sonny & Cher. There was at least one original song in each episode.

== Main voice cast ==
- Ron Masak as Meatballs
- Sally Julian as Spaghetti
- Frank Welker as Woofer
- Barry Gordon as Clyde

=== Additional voice talents ===
- Jack Angel
- Wally Burr
- Philip Clarke
- Regis Cordic (credited as Rege Cordic)
- Peter Cullen
- Ronald Gans
- David Hall
- Morgan Lofting
- Bill Ratner
- Ronnie Schell
- Marilyn Schreffler
- Hal Smith
- Paul Winchell

== Episodes ==
No.	Title	Original release date
1	"Woofer the Wonder Dog / Jazz Meets Jaws"	September 18, 1982
Meatball decides to get rid of the annoying Woofer by giving him to a circus. / Coming across a mechanical shark for a movie gives Meatball the idea to stage a shark attack to drum up attendance for their next show.
2	"Mixed Up Medical Reports / The Werewolf Story"	September 25, 1982
Meatball’s x-rays get mixed-up with those of a 200-year-old parrot with only two weeks to live. / Playing up to the town’s history of werewolves for their next gig gets the band invited to dinner by actual werewolves.
3	"Once Upon a Farm / The Big Shrink"	October 2, 1982
Meatball is tricked into trading their bus for a rundown farm. / Clyde accidentally creates a shrink ray that ends up shrinking him and Meatball to the size of insects.
4	"Spaghetti's Old Boyfriend / Watch the Birdie"	October 9, 1982
Meatball finds himself feeling inferior to Spaghetti’s handsome and athletic old boyfriend. / Meatball and Clyde plot to get a photo of a rare bird being born in order to win a $500 competition.
5	"The Space Aliens / Big Bad Bigfoot"	October 16, 1982
Aliens lure the band onto their ship to run experiments on them. / A camping vacation puts the band right in Bigfoot’s backyard.
6	"Come Back Little Woofer / Sunken Treasure Cruise"	October 23, 1982
Woofer falls on his head and develops amnesia after Meatball enters him into a dog show. / Finding a treasure map in an old chest that Spaghetti buys causes Meatball to spend all their money to go on a treasure hunt.
7	"Monkey Doodle Dandies / Throwing the Bull"	October 30, 1982
After discovering a chimpanzee’s paintings sell for big bucks, Meatball decides to teach a chimp of their own to paint. / The band comes up with plans to replace the bull they had accidentally knocked out in an upcoming bullfight.
8	"Going to the Dogs / The Caveman Story"	November 6, 1982
Meatball plans to rent out Woofer as a guard dog for extra money. / Clyde builds Spaghetti an arcade machine for her birthday he accidentally made with a part from an experimental time machine.
9	"Piracy on the High C's / Robot Roadie"	November 13, 1982
Meatball and Clyde end up with jobs as night watchmen at a record company the night record pirates decide to rob the place. / Meatball tasks Clyde with building the band a robot roadie to handle their equipment for them.
10	"The Kid Sitters / Doubles or Nothing"	November 20, 1982
Meatball and Clyde babysit the pet goat of a famous record producer to get him to listen to their demo. / Meatball and Clyde get jobs as extras in a movie just as a thief robs the studio payroll.
11	"Foreign Legion Air-Heads / Magical Moments"	November 27, 1982
Meatball and Clyde accidentally enlist in the French Foreign Legion and are shipped off to a desert outpost. / Jealous Meatball thinks Spaghetti is leaving him for a man with more money.
12	"Woofer Meets Tweeter / Flying Carpet Caper"	December 4, 1982
The band is talked into taking over Spaghetti’s cousin Debbie’s pizza stand so that she and her friends can go to a rock concert. / Spaghetti buys a chest at an auction that ends up containing a magic flying carpet that a couple of strange characters want to get their hands on.
13	"A Christmas Tale / The Beach Peaches"	December 11, 1982
Meatball and Clyde must deliver presents after they end up getting the real Santa arrested for chaos they caused in their department store jobs. / Debbie and her friends enter a boat race against their rival, and if she wins they must leave the beach…for good.
