= Marvel Action Universe =

Syndicated television block

- Network: Syndication
- Launched: October 2, 1988; 37 years ago
- Closed: September 26, 1991; 34 years ago
- Country of origin: United States
- Owner: Marvel Productions; New World Television
- Format: Animated series
- Running time: 90 minutes (60 minutes in some markets)
- Original language: English

Marvel Action Universe was a 1988–1991 American weekly syndicated television block from Marvel Productions featuring animated adaptions of Dino-Riders and RoboCop, along with reruns of the 1981 Spider-Man cartoon and Spider-Man and His Amazing Friends.

== Format ==
The first half of the hour was an episode of Dino-Riders; the second half an episode of RoboCop. Reruns of the 1981 Spider-Man cartoon (alternating with Spider-Man and His Amazing Friends) were aired, making the program 90 minutes long in some markets. The block is notable for debuting the X-Men pilot, X-Men: Pryde of the X-Men during its second season. Various other Marvel cartoons began airing during the show's second season as well.

To coincide the airings of various shows on the program, Marvel produced a few comics based on some of the shows. In 1989, a Dino-Riders comic series was published by Marvel. Also in 1989, Marvel reprinted the original one-shot comic Spider-Man and His Amazing Friends, first published in 1981, retitled as Marvel Action Universe #1. In 1990, Marvel published another one-shot comic titled X-Men Animation Special, an adaptation of Pryde of the X-Men that featured cell animation from the cartoon rather than original art. Beginning in 1990, Marvel published a RoboCop comic adaption, which lasted two years.

== Series overview ==
=== First-run series ===
==== Dino-Riders ====
Dino-Riders was introduced primarily as a promotion to launch a new Tyco toy line. The series told the story of the Valorians, a peaceful race of telepathic humans whose home planet was conquered by the Rulon Empire. 400 survivors escaped on a space ship and time traveled to prehistoric Earth using the experimental Space-Time Energy Projector (also known as the S.T.E.P). But Emperor Krulos and his lead commanders accidentally followed them into the past when a tractor beam locked onto the Valorians' ship during the time jump. Stranded in the past, the two groups recruited the planet's dinosaur population into their struggle. The Valorians used their telepathy for taming dinosaurs to ride and for domestic use. The Rulons captured dinosaurs with 'brain boxes'. These were large metal helmets which fit onto dinosaur's heads and control their brains. Both Valorians and Rulons would often fit dinosaurs with huge arrays of laser and weapon platforms, upon which people could ride, and attack one another. Battles were mostly motivated by the Rulon's desire to steal the S.T.E.P. from the Valorians, and almost always inconclusive, seldom accomplishing more for either side than restoring the status quo from the beginning of the episode.

==== Pryde of the X-Men ====
Pryde of the X-Men is an unsold animated television pilot from 1989 starring the X-Men. The title is a pun based on the name of X-Men member Kitty Pryde, who is the central character. The pilot aired infrequently, often in the time slot held by RoboCop.

==== RoboCop ====
The animated version of RoboCop is based on the character and events of the movie of the same name. The series is a continuation from the movie, with Alex Murphy (RoboCop) still fighting to save the city of Old Detroit from assorted rogue elements, and on occasion, fighting to reclaim aspects of his humanity and maintain his usefulness in the eyes of the "Old Man", president of Omni Consumer Products (OCP). Many episodes see RoboCop's reputation put to the test or soured by interventions from Dr. McNamara, the creator of ED-260, the upgradable version of the Enforcement Droid Series 209 and the top competitor for the financial backing of OCP. McNamara often develops other mechanical menaces that frequently threaten RoboCop. On the home front, RoboCop is befriended as always by Officer Anne Lewis, but is also picked on and lambasted by the prejudiced Lieutenant Hedgecock, ever determined to be rid of him.

=== Rebroadcasts ===
==== Defenders of the Earth ====
The animated television series from 1986, featuring characters from three comic strips distributed by King Features Syndicate—Flash Gordon, the Phantom, and Mandrake the Magician—battling the Flash Gordon villain Ming the Merciless in the year 2015. Supporting characters include their children Rick Gordon, Jedda Walker (daughter of the Phantom), Kshin (adopted son of Mandrake), Mandrake's assistant Lothar, and Lothar's son L.J. The show lasted for 65 episodes; there was also a short-lived comic book series published by Star Comics (an imprint of Marvel Comics). The closing credits credit Rob Walsh and Tony Pastor for the main title music, and Stan Lee for the lyrics.

The plot begins with Flash Gordon and his son Rick escaping from Ming. Ming has exhausted all the natural resources of his home planet Mongo and has set his sights on Earth. Flash's wife Dale Arden is captured and Ming tries to brainwash her. She resists to the point of death.

==== Dungeons & Dragons ====
The 1983 animated television series based on TSR's Dungeons & Dragons role-playing game. A co-production of Marvel Productions and TSR. The show's story editors were Hank Saroyan (who voice directed the series) and Steve Gerber, both of whom contributed episodes and had a firm hand in the writing of the series. The level of violence was controversial for American children's television at the time, and the script of one episode, "The Dragon's Graveyard", was almost shelved because the characters contemplated killing their nemesis Venger. In 1985, the National Coalition on Television Violence demanded that the Federal Communications Commission run a warning during each broadcast stating that Dungeons & Dragons had been linked to real life violent deaths. The series spawned more than 100 different licenses, and the show led its time slot for two years.

The general premise of the show is that a group of children are pulled into the "Realm of Dungeons & Dragons" by taking a magical dark ride on a roller coaster. Invariably, the children try to return home, but often take detours to help people, or find that their fates are intertwined with the fate of others.

Upon arriving in the Realm, the children are a little out of place, but the Dungeon Master, named for the referee in the role-playing game, assuming the role of their mentor, appears and gives them each a class and a magical item to suit that class.

==== The Incredible Hulk ====
The 1982 animated series based on the Marvel Comics character of the same name. The series was based upon the Hulk comic in regards to the origin story (albeit with supposedly alien involvement rather than Soviet spies), as well as featuring characters from the comics including Rick Jones, Ned Talbot, Betty Ross, Thunderbolt Ross, and She-Hulk. Only one Hulk villain appeared in a single episode of the series, the Leader, with original characters and villains normally associated with other Marvel characters appearing in the other episodes.

==== The New Fantastic Four ====
The 1978 animated series based on Marvel's comic book series Fantastic Four. Due to rights issues, the series replaced the character of the Human Torch with a robot named H.E.R.B.I.E. (Humanoid Experimental Robot, B-type, Integrated Electronics). However, a long-lasting rumor stated that this change was made because executives did not want young viewers to imitate the Human Torch by setting themselves on fire.

==== Spider-Man / Spider-Man and His Amazing Friends ====
The 1981 syndicated version of Spider-Man was based on the popular Marvel Comics character of the same name. The series featured Peter Parker having to balance his alter ego crimefighting with his responsibilities as a university student, a part-time photographer for the Daily Bugle and caring for his elderly Aunt May. Spider-Man and His Amazing Friends, which originally aired on NBC around the same time, featured Spider-Man, Iceman, and Firestar. In this incarnation, the three superheroes are all college students at Empire State University, who operate as the "Spider-Friends" as the superheroes battle various supervillains.

==== Spider-Woman ====
The 1979 animated television series, based on the Marvel Comics character Spider-Woman. According to the title sequence, Jessica Drew (voiced by Joan Van Ark) was bitten by a poisonous spider as a child; her father saved her life by injecting her with an experimental "spider serum," which also granted her superhuman powers. As an adult, Jessica is the editor of Justice Magazine, with two other employees featured; photographer Jeff and Jessica's teenage nephew Billy. When trouble arises, Jessica slips away to change into her secret identity of Spider-Woman.

== Stations ==
City	Station
Atlanta	WATL 36 (Fox)
Baltimore	WNUV 54 (Ind)
Boston	WLVI 56 (Ind)
Burlington	WVNY 22 (ABC)
Cleveland	WJW 8 (CBS); WUAB 43 (Ind)
Dallas	KXTX 39 (Ind)
Detroit	WKBD 50 (Fox)
Greeneville/Bristol	WEMT 39 (Fox)
Hartford	WTIC 61 (Fox)
Indianapolis	WTTV 4 (Ind)
Kansas City	KZKC 62 (Ind)
Los Angeles	KTLA 5 (Ind)
Miami	WBFS 33 (Ind); WDZL 39 (Ind)
Minneapolis	KITN 29 (Fox)
New York	WNBC 4 (NBC)
Palm Beach	W19AQ 19 (Ind)
Philadelphia	WGBS 57 (Ind)
Phoenix	KUTP 45 (Ind)
Pittsburgh	WPGH 53 (Fox)
Sacramento	KQCA 58 (Ind)
San Francisco	KOFY 20 (Ind)
Seattle	KCPQ 13 (Fox)
St. John's	CJON 21
St. Petersburg/Tampa	WTOG 44 (Ind)
Washington, D.C.	WDCA 20 (Ind)

== The Marvel Action Hour ==
During the second season of The Marvel Action Hour from 1995 to 1996, the series was given the revived Marvel Action Universe banner.
