= Dennis Marks (screenwriter) =

American screenwriter

- Born: August 2, 1932; New York City, New York
- Died: January 10, 2006 (aged 73); Los Angeles, California
- Occupations: Screenwriter, producer, voice actor
- Years active: 1963–1992
- Children: Amanda Marks

Dennis Marks (August 2, 1932 – January 10, 2006) was an American screenwriter, producer and voice actor, mainly for children's animations. Marks wrote for several big production companies during the 1960s through to the 1990s, including Hanna-Barbera, DC and Marvel. He wrote screenplays and stories for many popular animation shows including Batfink, The Beatles, Dungeons & Dragons and Spider-Man, providing the voice for the Green Goblin in the latter. He also worked as a producer for Children's TV show Wonderama, chat show A.M. New York and Spider-Man and His Amazing Friends.

== Career history ==
=== Early career ===
Marks was born in New York City in 1932. His parents were vaudevillians, though Marks did not follow them to the stage despite showing a strong interest in performing magic tricks. He was awarded a bachelor's degree from Duke University in North Carolina, before serving in the United States Navy aboard the Lexington as a public information officer.

Marks began his career in entertainment writing with Alan Friedman as a song writing team. Their first song together was used in the off-Broadway revue Fallout (1959), which also included the first material by Martin Charnin. The pair were also signed by the BMI Musical Comedy program, but when Marks' agent offered him work in cartoons he took the offer alone. In a 2002 interview, Marks stated that he had been an avid comic book reader as a child and happily took the job.

=== Early cartoon shows (1960s) ===
Marks was hired by head of King Features TV, Al Brodax, to bring to television the comic strips of William Randolph Hearst, which the company handled. The first script Marks wrote was for a six-minute short of Barney Google and Snuffy Smith in 1963. It was accepted by the company and Marks began writing further cartoon scripts, completing at least eight more Snuffy Smiths and work on some Beetle Bailey cartoons. In between Marks had, with Friedman, continued to write songs for a Sherlock Holmes musical, and was hired as a junior screenwriter on the American Scene Magazine for The Jackie Gleason Show. Though after returning to New York from his honeymoon, Brodax offered Marks the screenwriting duties for a cartoon based on The Beatles, which decided Marks' career choice as a cartoon writer. Although uncredited, Marks, along with Jack Mendelsohn, Heywood Kling and Bruce Howard, wrote all 39 episodes of the Beatles' cartoon. In 1965, the Sherlock Holmes musical he had helped create, opened on Broadway as Baker Street, but without Marks on board.

In the late 1960s, Marks continued writing for various shows, including The Batman/Superman Hour and Aquaman, his first foray into superhero cartoons for DC. Marks stated that his preference in comic books lay in DC Comics because his mother had been a friend of Harry Donenfeld, the owner of DC, who sent him free comics for several years. It was during this period that Marks wrote half of the hundred episodes to Hal Seeger's Batfink and worked on scripts for Max, the 2000-Year-Old Mouse.

=== Wonderama and A.M. New York ===
By 1971, there was little scope for cartoon writing in New York and Marks left for Los Angeles finding work for Hanna-Barbera. He worked on The Amazing Chan and the Chan Clan (as Dennis Marx), Josie and the Pussycats and The Barkleys, the later of which he was joined by Kling, who had also written with Marks on both The Beatles and Batfink. Marks was on the verge of settling in Los Angeles, when a meeting with Bob McAllister led to a job producing the weekly children's show Wonderama. Wonderama was a long running show broadcast by Metromedia across five stations. Marks remained with the show for four years before switching to 'A.M. New York', a one-hour daily talk show. This lasted only two years, and by its end, Marks was again looking for work in cartoon screen writing. He headed back to Los Angeles, and got a short-term staff position at Hanna-Barbera. This was followed by a one-year contract with Filmation, writing for The Tarzan/Lone Ranger Adventure Hour.

=== Work with Marvel ===
In the early 1980s, Broadax recommended to Marks that he should try writing for Marvel Productions, who were looking to bring Spider-Man back to the screen. Marks had met with Marvel's creative figurehead, Stan Lee, when he had appeared on Wonderama; and after a couple of presentations, Marks was hired. He wrote for the 1981 Spider-Man series, produced and wrote for Spider-Man and His Amazing Friends and wrote for The Incredible Hulk. In all three he also provided voices, he voiced the Green Goblin in both Spider-Man series, Doctor Faustus in one episode of Amazing Friends, and additional voices in The Incredible Hulk.

Marks later acquired the rights to the Dungeon & Dragons role-playing game brand for a television show. Marks made a verbal and written pitch to Dungeon & Dragons creator Gary Gygax, which was accepted. This led to the creation of Marvel's Dungeons & Dragons TV series. Although heavily involved in its creation, and by his own account creating the concept of the series protagonists being lost in a fantasy world through a fairground ride; he would not see the production through. Marvel fired Marks in 1983 after disagreements with the TV networks.

=== Later work ===
Marks continued writing and producing stories for cartoon shows and, in the second half of the 1980s, worked on Galtar and the Golden Lance (1985), The Transformers (1985) and several short animated retellings of Christian stories. He also wrote the story for 1987 animated television film Yogi Bear and the Magical Flight of the Spruce Goose to which he also provided the soundtrack and lyrics, and he was a writer for a few episodes of Foofur.

His work in the 1990s saw the release of Jetsons: The Movie (1990), his only original story that was released to cinemas. He wrote for Teenage Mutant Ninja Turtles (1990–1991), and his work on Tom & Jerry Kids (1990) led to his screenplay for Tom and Jerry: The Movie. He died at his home in Los Angeles in 2006 of pancreatic cancer.

== Screenwriting credits ==
=== Television ===
- The Beatles (1965–1967)
- Batfink (1966–1967)
- The Batman/Superman Hour (1968)
- Josie and the Pussycats (1970)
- The Amazing Chan and the Chan Clan (1972)
- The Barkleys (1972)
- The Tarzan/Lone Ranger Adventure Hour (1980)
- Spider-Man and His Amazing Friends (1981–1983)
- Pandamonium (1982)
- Dungeons & Dragons (1983–1985): co-creator
- The Incredible Hulk (1983)
- The Super Mario Bros. Super Show! (1988)
- Dragon’s Lair (1984)
- Paw Paws (1984)
- Turbo Teen (1984)
- Galtar and the Golden Lance (1985)
- The Transformers (1985)
- The Flintstone Kids (1986)
- Foofur (1987)
- Teenage Mutant Ninja Turtles (1990)
- Tom & Jerry Kids (1990–1991)
- Batman: The Animated Series (1992)
- Transformers: Generation 2 (1993)

=== Films ===
- Yogi Bear and the Magical Flight of the Spruce Goose (1987)
- Jetsons: The Movie (1990)
- Tom and Jerry: The Movie (1992)
