= Marvel Productions =

American production company

Marvel Productions Ltd.; New World Animation
- New World Animation's logo, which was used from 1993 to 1996
- Formerly: DePatie–Freleng Enterprises (1963–1980); Marvel Productions Ltd. (1980–1993)
- Type: Subsidiary
- Industry: Film; Television
- Predecessor: DePatie–Freleng Enterprises
- Founded: June 19, 1980; 46 years ago
- Founder: David H. DePatie; Lee Gunther
- Defunct: 1996; 30 years ago
- Fate: Acquired by News Corporation and folded into Fox Family Worldwide
- Successors: Studio: 20th Century Animation; Marvel Animation; Marvel Studios Animation; Library: The Walt Disney Company (majority); Hasbro Entertainment (Hasbro toyline-based series co-produced with Sunbow Entertainment and Claster Television); Amazon MGM Studios (via United Artists; Pink at First Sight only); Skydance Corporation (via Turner Entertainment Co.; series co-produced with MGM/UA Entertainment Co. Television)
- Headquarters: Hollywood, Los Angeles, California
- Key people: Stan Lee; David H. DePatie; Margaret Loesch; Tom Tataranowicz
- Products: Animated series; Television programs; Television specials; Theatrical films
- Parent: Cadence Industries (1980–1986); Marvel Entertainment Group (1986–1989); New World Entertainment (1989–1996)

Marvel Productions Ltd., later known as New World Animation, was an American animation studio owned by the Fox Entertainment Group subsidiary of News Corporation which was founded in 1980 as the television and film studio subsidiary of the Marvel Entertainment Group, based in Hollywood, Los Angeles, California. It later became a subsidiary of New World Entertainment and eventually of News Corporation.

The company as Marvel Productions produced animated television series, films and television specials such as Spider-Man and His Amazing Friends, The Incredible Hulk, My Little Pony: The Movie, The Transformers: The Movie, and G.I. Joe: The Movie as well as The Transformers, Muppet Babies, and G.I. Joe: A Real American Hero television series. Most of Marvel Productions/New World Animation's non-Hasbro-related back catalog is currently owned by The Walt Disney Company.

== History ==
=== DePatie–Freleng Enterprises (1963–1980) ===
The company began in 1963 as DFE Films, and was sold to Cadence Industries, Marvel Comics Group's owner, in 1980 after DFE founder and company executive Friz Freleng departed the company to return to his former job at Warner Bros. Animation. Freleng's business partner and DFE co-founder David H. DePatie continued to work for the company under the Marvel banner for several years until his retirement.

=== Marvel Productions (1980–1993) ===
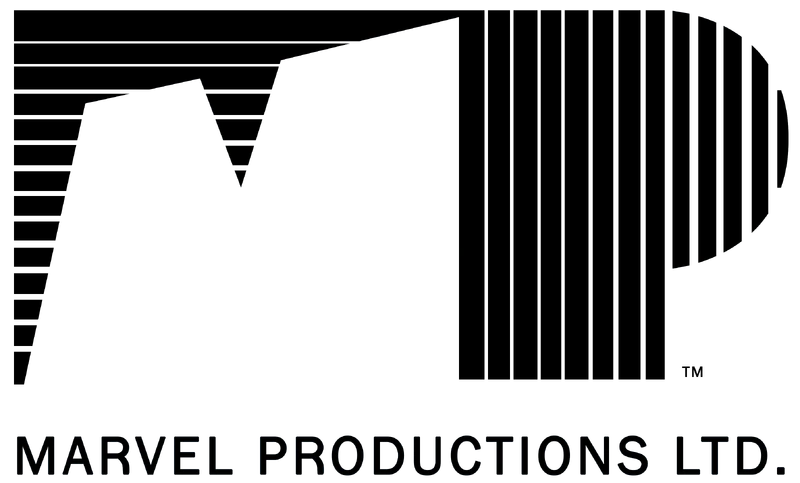
Logo for Marvel Productions from 1980 to 1993

Marvel Productions opened its Los Angeles studio in 1980. On February 8, 1984, studios' headquarters in Sherman Oaks suffered a fire, which destroyed facility. In 1984, Margaret Loesch joined Marvel Productions as president and chief executive officer. Marvel Comics Group, owned by Cadence Industries Corporation since 1968, was sold to New World Pictures in 1986 along with Marvel Productions and incorporated as Marvel Entertainment Group (MEG).

With New World having cash flow problems, MEG was sold in January 1989 to Andrews Group, a MacAndrews and Forbes subsidiary, owned by Ronald Perelman (who owned New World Entertainment previously). However, New World kept Marvel Productions and merged it with its own television business. MP moved their offices from Van Nuys to West Los Angeles in May 1989.

New World's problems continued, which led them to also be acquired by the Andrews Group within the year. Loesch left for Fox Kids in 1990. In December 1992, New World formed New World Family Filmworks and New World Action Animation, headed by Marvel Productions president Rick Ungar, to produce $20 million worth of family entertainment programming.

=== New World Animation (1993–1996) ===
Marvel Productions was renamed New World Animation in November 1993. In 1994, Marvel and New World established Marvel Films including Marvel Films Animation. New World Animation (The Incredible Hulk), Saban Entertainment (X-Men), and Marvel Films Animation (Spider-Man), each produced a Marvel series for television. Tom Tataranowicz was in charge of both Marvel Films Animation and New World Animation during this period.

=== News Corporation subsidiary (1996) ===
News Corporation/Fox Entertainment Group acquired New World Entertainment, along with New World Animation and Marvel Films Animation for $2.5 billion in August 1996. At the same time, Saban Entertainment secured the rights from Marvel Entertainment Group for Captain America, Daredevil, and Silver Surfer, and additional characters to be developed into four series and 52 episodes over the next seven years.

Fox Children's Productions and Saban Entertainment merged to form Fox Kids Worldwide, a holding company and joint venture, in November 1996, while Fox retained ownership of New World Animation.

=== Postscript ===
In July 2001, Fox Family Worldwide and its assets, including the Marvel Productions library and Saban Entertainment, were purchased by The Walt Disney Company for $5.2 billion.

After getting its 2002 profit participation statements for the Marvel Productions library, Marvel Enterprises sued The Walt Disney Company over royalties in August 2004 after Disney would not open their books. This was followed by a November 2004 suit which claimed that the purchase of Fox Family did not transfer the shows' copyrights to Disney as the purchase was done without Marvel's approval. As part of both suits, Marvel claimed library income concealment and failure to exploit the characters.

On August 31, 2009, Disney acquired Marvel Entertainment for $4 billion, reunifying the Marvel Productions library and Marvel Entertainment under the same corporate banner. After Disney's acquisition of 21st Century Fox on March 20, 2019, the Marvel Productions and Fox Kids/Saban Entertainment libraries reunited with the New World Animation library.

== Filmography ==
=== Animated series ===
Show	Year	Network	Notes
Spider-Man	1981	Syndication	Marvel property
Spider-Man and His Amazing Friends	1981–1983	NBC	Marvel property, paired with The Incredible Hulk
The Incredible Hulk	1982	NBC	Marvel property, paired with Spider-Man and His Amazing Friends
Meatballs & Spaghetti	1982	CBS	co-production with InterMedia Entertainment Company, Pan Sang East Co. Ltd, and MGM/UA Television
Pandamonium	1982	CBS	co-production with InterMedia Entertainment Company and MGM/UA Television
Dungeons & Dragons	1983–1985	CBS	co-production with TSR Entertainment/Dungeons and Dragons Entertainment Corp currently co-owned by Disney and Hasbro Entertainment
G.I. Joe: A Real American Hero	1983–1986	Syndication	based on Hasbro toyline of same name with Sunbow Productions
Muppet Babies	1984–1991	CBS	based on Jim Henson's Muppets
The Transformers	1984–1987	Syndication	based on Hasbro toyline of same name with Sunbow Productions
Little Muppet Monsters	1985	CBS	based on Jim Henson's Muppets, co-produced with Henson Associates
Super Sunday (a.k.a. Super Saturday): Robotix; Bigfoot and the Muscle Machines; Jem and the Holograms; Inhumanoids	1985	Syndication	based on Hasbro toyline of same name co-produced with Sunbow Productions
The Young Astronauts	1986	CBS	Licensed from the Young Astronaut Council and planned to be adapted into a comic book by Marvel Comics; Series was cancelled after Rogers Commission investigation into STS-51-L (Space Shuttle Challenger explosion) three days after episode was broadcast, resulting in litigation between the parties settled in 1990.
Jem and the Holograms	1986	Syndication	based on Hasbro toyline of same name co-produced with Sunbow Productions
Inhumanoids	1986	Syndication	based on Hasbro toyline of same name co-produced with Sunbow Productions
My Little Pony 'n Friends: The Glo Friends; MoonDreamers; Potato Head Kids	1986	Syndication	based on Hasbro toyline of same name, coproduced with Sunbow Productions; first half of the show was My Little Pony while the second half was a wheel series
Defenders of the Earth	1986	Syndication	co-production with King Features Syndicate (owner)
Fraggle Rock: The Animated Series	1987	NBC	based on Fraggle Rock
Little Wizards	1987	ABC	co-production with New World International
The Little Clowns of Happytown	1987	ABC	co-production with Murakami-Wolf-Swenson currently owned by WildBrain
Dino-Riders	1988	Syndication	co-produced by Tyco Toys; aired as part of the Marvel Action Universe block
RoboCop	1988	Syndication	co-production with Orion Pictures; aired as part of the Marvel Action Universe block
Rude Dog and the Dweebs	1989	CBS	
X-Men: Pryde of the X-Men	1989	Syndication	aired on the Marvel Action Universe block as a pilot for an X-Men series
Attack of the Killer Tomatoes	1990–1991	FOX	co-production with Fox Children's Productions
Kid 'n Play	1990–1991	NBC	co-production with Saban Entertainment
Space Cats	1991–1992	NBC	co-production with Paul Fusco Productions
Bucky O'Hare and the Toad Wars!	1991	Syndication (U.S.)	co-production with Abrams/Gentile Entertainment, Continuity Comics, IDDH, and Sunbow Productions
Little Shop	1991	Fox	co-production with Saban Entertainment, Saban International N.V., BIL Participations S.A. and Gorfy Corporation N.V.
Biker Mice from Mars	1993–1996	Syndication	studio known as New World Animation onwards, released as Marvel Productions, distributed by New World (internationally), Genesis Entertainment (domestically), co-production with Brentwood Television Funnies, Worldwide Sports & Entertainment, Inc. and Philippine Animation Studios
The Incredible Hulk	1996	UPN	season 1, co-production with Marvel Films and Saerom Animation

- Stealth Warriors

=== TV specials ===
Airdate	Title	Network	Notes
February 14, 1981	Pink at First Sight	ABC	production inherited from DePatie–Freleng Enterprises
May 20, 1982	The Grinch Grinches the Cat in the Hat	ABC	production inherited from DePatie–Freleng Enterprises, co-production with Dr. Seuss
October 25, 1983	The Charmkins	syndication	based on Hasbro toyline of same name
April 14, 1984	My Little Pony: Rescue at Midnight Castle	syndication	based on Hasbro toyline of same name
September 12, 1984	The Secret World of the Very Young	CBS	co-production with Sunbow Productions
March 23, 1985	My Little Pony: Escape from Catrina	syndication	based on Hasbro toyline of same name
1987	Blondie and Dagwood	CBS	co-production with King Features Syndicate
1989	Blondie and Dagwood: Second Wedding Workout	CBS	co-production with King Features Syndicate
1993	The Magic Paintbrush	CBS	CBS prime time special sponsored by McDonald's
November 28, 1996	Party Town Friends	Syndication	

Except for Fraggle Rock, the rights to series based on Jim Henson properties are now held by The Muppets Studio, a subsidiary of the Walt Disney Company.

All programs based on Hasbro properties were co-productions with Sunbow Productions. These programs are now owned by Hasbro through its entertainment unit.

=== Theatrical and DTV films ===
Airdate	Title	studio	Notes
November 28, 1984	Gallavants		Direct-to-Video
June 20, 1986	My Little Pony: The Movie	with Sunbow Productions	Theatrical
August 8, 1986	The Transformers: The Movie	with Sunbow Productions	Theatrical
April 20, 1987	G.I. Joe: The Movie	with Sunbow Productions	Direct-to-Video planned for theatrical release.
January 1993	Gahan Wilson's Diner		Theatrical short

=== Film titles ===
- Trail of the Pink Panther (1982) (inherited from DePatie–Freleng Enterprises)
- Curse of the Pink Panther (1983) (inherited from DePatie–Freleng Enterprises)

=== TV pilots ===
Title	Original broadcast	Network
Solarman	1988	Syndication
X-Men: Pryde of the X-Men	1989	Syndication

== Executives ==
- David H. DePatie – president and chief executive officer (1980–1984)
- Margaret Loesch – president and chief executive officer (1984–1990)
- Joe Taritero – president and chief executive officer (1990–1991)
- Rick Ungar – president and chief executive officer (1991–August 1995)
- Lee Gunther – senior vice president, production (1986)
- Stan Lee – vice president, creative affairs (1986)
- Michael Wahl – vice president, business affairs (1986)
- Peter Knepper – vice president and chief financial officer (1986)
- Hank Sarovan – vice president (1986)
