= Spider-Man (1981 TV series) =

1981 American animated television series

- Genre: Superhero; Action; Adventure
- Created by: Stan Lee
- Based on: Spider-Man by: Stan Lee; Steve Ditko
- Written by: Creighton Barnes; Doug Booth; Francis K. Feighan; Donald F. Glut; Jack Hanrahan; Christy Marx; Larry Parr; Jeffrey Scott
- Starring: Ted Schwartz; Lee Bailey; Linda Gary; Morgan Lofting; Mona Marshall; William Woodson
- Composer: Johnny Douglas
- Country of origin: United States
- No. of episodes: 26

Production
- Executive producers: David H. DePatie; Lee Gunther
- Producer: Arthur Vitello
- Running time: 22 minutes
- Production company: Marvel Productions

Original release
- Network: Syndication
- Release: September 12, 1981 – March 6, 1982

Related
- Spider-Man (1967); Spider-Man and His Amazing Friends

Spider-Man is a 1981–82 American animated TV series based on the Marvel Comics character of the same name. It is the second Spider-Man cartoon, following the 1967 series.

== Synopsis ==
The series featured Peter Parker having to balance his alter ego crimefighting with his responsibilities as a university student, a part-time photographer for the Daily Bugle and caring for his elderly Aunt May Parker.

While Spider-Man fights his usual enemies, six episodes have him contending with Doctor Doom.

== Cast ==
- Ted Schwartz – Spider-Man/Peter Parker
- Jack Angel – Dr. Donald Blake (in "Wrath of the Sub-Mariner"), Man Mountain Marko (in "Wrath of the Sub-Mariner"), Moe (in "Triangle of Evil")
- Lee Bailey – Robbie Robertson
- William Boyett – Cat Burglar (in "Arsenic and Aunt May")
- Wally Burr – Sandman (in "The Sandman is Coming"), Sam Block (in "The Doom Report"), Dean Stockton (in "Canon of Doom")
- Corey Burton – Lizard (in "Lizards, Lizards Everywhere")
- Philip L. Clarke – Sidewinder/Wild Willie Wilson (in "The Sidewinder Strikes"), Waiter (in "The Sidewinder Strikes")
- Regis Cordic – Ringmaster (in "Carnival of Crime")
- Henry Corden – Man with Briefcase (in "The Return of Kingpin"), Lead Henchman (in "The Return of the Kingpin"), Fosdic (in "The Return of Kingpin")
- Brad Crandall – Doctor Doom
- Peter Cullen – Red Skull (in "The Capture of Captain America"), Stuntman/Jack Riven (in "Triangle of Evil")
- Brian Cummings – Empire State University Principal (in "The Pied Piper of New York Town"), General (in "The Pied Piper of New York Town")
- Jeff David – Akim (in "The Doom Report")
- Jack DeLeon – Kraven the Hunter (in "The Hunter and the Hunted")
- Ralph James – Uncle Ben (in "Arsenic and Aunt May")
- Lynn Johnson – Hammerhead (in "Wrath of the Sub-Mariner")
- Morgan Lofting – Aunt May, Black Cat (in "Curiosity Killed the Spiderman"), Penny (in "The Web of Nephilia")
- Mona Marshall – Betty Brant, Rodeo Girl (in "The Sidewinder Strikes"), Boy Victor Von Doom (in "Canon of Doom")
- George DiCenzo – Captain America (in "The Capture of Captain America"), Wizard (in "Under the Wizard's Spell")
- Walker Edmiston – Magneto (in "When Magneto Speaks.... People Listen")
- Ron Feinberg – Professor Gizmo (in "The Unfathomable Professor Gizmo")
- Brian Fuld – Ka-Zar (in "The Hunter and the Hunted")
- Linda Gary – Colleen (in "Arsenic and Aunt May")
- Buster Jones – Acting Teacher (in "The Pied Piper of New York Town")
- Stan Jones – Doctor Octopus (in "Bubble, Bubble, Oil and Trouble"), Kingpin (in "Wrath of the Sub-Mariner" and "The Return of Kingpin")
- Les Lampson – Dr. Lee (in "Countdown to Doom")
- John H. Mayer – Chameleon (in "Arsenic and Aunt May"), Police Sergeant (in "Arsenic and Aunt May")
- Don Messick – Vulture (in "The Vulture Has Landed"), Hank Edwards (in "The Vulture Has Landed")
- Arlin Miller – Nephilia/Dr. Bradley Shaw (in "The Web of Nephilia")
- Vic Perrin – Goron (in "The A-B-C's of D-O-O-M"), Sub-Mariner (in "Wrath of the Sub-Mariner"), Caesar Cicero (in "Wrath of the Sub-Mariner")
- Tony Pope – Boris
- Richard Ramos – Gadgeteer/Joshua (in "The Incredible Shrinking Spider-Man")
- Gene Ross – Shocker (in "Triangle of Evil"), Larry (in "Triangle of Evil")
- Neil Ross – Green Goblin/Norman Osborn (in "Revenge of the Green Goblin"), Michael (in "Countdown to Doom")
- Michael Rye – Mysterio (in "The Pied Piper of New York Town"), Additional characters (in "The Pied Piper of New York Town")
- Marilyn Schreffler – Sally Ann Beaumont (in "The Sandman is Coming")
- Gary Seger – Johnny Griffon (in "Curiosity Killed the Spiderman"), Beyond Belief Host (in "Triangle of Evil")
- Michael Sheehan – Mortimer, Johan Klemmle, Young Reed Richards (in "Canon of Doom"), Young Victor Von Doom (in "Canon of Doom")
- John Stephenson – Dr. Norton (in "The Incredible Shrinking Spider-Man")
- Andre Stojka – NASA Worker (in "The Sandman Is Coming"), Hal Hunter (in "The Return of the Kingpin")
- B.J. Ward – Namorita (in "Wrath of the Sub-Mariner"), Medusa (in "Under the Wizard's Spell")
- Paul Winchell – Silvermane (in "Wrath of the Sub-Mariner"), Additional characters (in "Wrath of the Sub-Mariner")
- William Woodson – J. Jonah Jameson, Professor Donaldson (in "The Vulture Has Landed"), Dr. Everett (in "Wrath of the Sub-Mariner"), Dr. Niemann (in "The Capture of Captain America")

Note: Neil Ross would reprise his role as Norman Osborn/Green Goblin for the 1994 Spider-Man cartoon series.

Walter S. Burr was the voice director for the series.

== Episodes ==
No verified individual episode airdates have been established for this series. As a syndicated program, episodes aired at different times in different markets rather than on a single national broadcast schedule. For further details and the series' broadcast history, see the Distribution section below.

No.	Title	Written by
1	"Bubble, Bubble, Oil and Trouble"	TBA
Doctor Octopus commits various mysterious crimes in an effort to upgrade his mechanical arms and steal the world's oil supply.
2	"Dr. Doom, Master of the World"	TBA
Doctor Doom is mind-controlling world leaders so, at the upcoming United Nations meeting, they will declare him the master of the world.
3	"Lizards, Lizards, Everywhere"	TBA
Lizard is plotting to turn New York City into a swampland, filled with reptiles under his control.
4	"Curiosity Killed the Spiderman"	TBA
After Spider-Man stops her from robbing a Daily Bugle party hosted by J. Jonah Jameson, the Black Cat announces that she plans to steal the Maltese Mouse and challenges Spider-Man to try to stop her.
5	"The Sandman Is Coming"	TBA
The Sandman steals a radioactive soil sample from Mars from NASA and goes on a crime spree. Sally Ann Beaumont accuses Peter of negligence during Sandman's theft and reports his actions to Empire State University's board where there is a chance that he'll be thrown out.
6	"When Magneto Speaks... People Listen"	TBA
Magneto uses a spacecraft to increase his powers and shut off the nation's power supply.
7	"The Pied Piper of New York Town"	TBA
Mysterio opens up a new disco nightclub in town that turns its patrons and anyone else that hears the disco music into his slaves, whom he uses to try to steal a nuclear missile.
8	"The Doctor Prescribes Doom"	Larry Parr
Doctor Doom returns to replace the world leaders with robots under his control so they will declare him ruler of the world.
9	"Carnival of Crime"	TBA
The circus has come to town and the Ringmaster uses a special gas to rob banks while making people believe that Spider-Man is the thief.
10	"Revenge of the Green Goblin"	TBA
Norman Osborn escapes from a mental institution on Halloween night. When the train he is riding in crashes and blows up, he remembers that he is the Green Goblin and threatens to reveal to the world who Spider-Man really is and seeks revenge on Jameson for publishing stories about his chemical plant being unsafe.
11	"Triangle of Evil"	TBA
The Triangle of Evil led by Stuntman forces Spider-Man to survive deadly stunts as bills start piling up for Aunt May.
12	"The A-B-C's of D-O-O-M"	Larry Parr
Doctor Doom forms a criminal partnership with Goron to pose as humanitarians to gain control of a space craft.
13	"The Sidewinder Strikes"	TBA
A rodeo show has come to the city and the Sidewinder tries to steal the gold spurs.
14	"The Hunter and the Hunted"	Donald F. Glut
After being hired by Jameson to look for a mascot for the Daily Bugle, Kraven the Hunter comes to the city as a hero when he captures Zabu, the last surviving saber-tooth tiger from the Savage Land. Ka-Zar comes to the city to liberate his animal companion.
15	"The Incredible Shrinking Spider-Man"	TBA
A janitor, feeling that his genius is ignored, dons the identity of the Gadgeteer to steal his employer Dr. Norton's new device that can shrink anything and uses it to shrink Spider-Man.
16	"The Unfathomable Professor Gizmo"	TBA
Professor Gizmo seeks to reclaim sunken treasure and requires Spider-Man's help to do so.
17	"Canon of Doom"	Larry Parr
Doctor Doom secretly uses a laser cannon to create a fault line on New York City and then promises to fix the problem, when in fact he plans to use his laser cannon to create more earthquakes.
18	"The Capture of Captain America"	Donald F. Glut
Captain America is kidnapped by the Red Skull who plans to swap minds with him and take over the military. After Jameson blames him for the kidnapping, Spider-Man tries to save Captain America.
19	"The Doom Report"	Larry Parr
Freedom fighters from Latveria start an underground movement in New York City while Doctor Doom orders the United Nations to make him ruler of the world or else he will use his weather control device to cause chaos.
20	"The Web of Nephilia"	Christy Marx
A scientist named Dr. Bradley Shaw transforms into a mutant spider when trying to gain Spider-Man's powers from his blood sample and due to the level raising caused by his assistant Penny who has her own agenda. Meanwhile, Peter must find a way to give blood when Jameson wants his employees to donate at a blood drive.
21	"Countdown to Doom"	Larry Parr
NASA sends a rocket into space built by Doctor Doom unaware that he has attached a device to it that will move the Earth out of orbit, sending it into a new ice age, in an effort to force the United Nations to declare him to be the master of the world.
22	"Arsenic and Aunt May"	Donald F. Glut
Spider-Man catches the relative of the burglar that killed Ben Parker. When in prison, he meets Chameleon which leads him to discover Spidey's secret identity. He poses as Uncle Ben's spirit and tricks Aunt May into seeing his minion Colleen posing as a medium. Colleen would give Aunt May a necklace that will hypnotize her into trying to kill Spider-Man.
23	"The Vulture Has Landed"	TBA
The Vulture has been kidnapping scientists in an effort to gain control of a NASA space probe. Peter goes to see his friend Harry in his apartment, but he's not home. Vulture mistakes Peter as Harry when he borrows one of Harry's outfits after losing his civilian clothes and kidnaps him.
24	"Wrath of the Sub-Mariner"	Donald F. Glut
Upon calling a truce with crime lords Silvermane (who is accompanied by Man Mountain Marko), Hammerhead, and Caesar Cicero, the Kingpin shows them a powerful acid developed by Dr. Everett to unite the crime lords in a plot to pull off crimes. The subsequent chemical waste from the new chemical is illegally dumping into the water, causing sickness to Sub-Mariner's cousin, Namorita. He takes her to the nearest doctor Dr. Donald Blake, then begins to wreak havoc on the surface world.
25	"The Return of Kingpin"	TBA
The Kingpin has his minion Hal Hunter trick Spider-Man into committing a series of crimes.
26	"Under the Wizard's Spell"	Christy Marx
The Wizard invites Medusa to New York City, where he uses an unremovable collar on her in order to forces Medusa to steal an electronic device from a military base for him.

== Production ==
=== Background ===
In late 1979, DePatie–Freleng Enterprises began pre-production on a new Spider-Man animated series. Following the dissolution of DePatie–Freleng and the subsequent formation of Marvel Productions in 1980, production of the proposed series was resumed by the new studio. The solo Spider-Man series was Marvel Productions' first project.

According to Dennis Marks, producer and story editor of Spider-Man and His Amazing Friends, the series was wholly funded by Marvel Comics partially with the intent of gaining NBC's interest in a Spider-Man property from Marvel Productions. It was determined that the series would be offered as a syndication package alongside the 1967 Spider-Man series, which informed certain aspects of the series' production, including the presence of Betty Brant — a regular character in the 1967 series but largely written out of the comics by late 1979 — and visual elements such as Peter Parker's civilian costume of a blue jacket and yellow turtleneck sweater from later episodes of the 1967 series. NBC agreed to purchase a new Spider-Man based series incorporating their requirements for Saturday morning network programming, resulting in Spider-Man and His Amazing Friends, which first aired on September 12, 1981. Although the solo Spider-Man series had also been completed by the end of 1981, it did not air that year.

=== Production details ===
The majority of the series' 26 episodes were directed by Art Vitello, who also laid out and directed the opening title sequence for Spider-Man and His Amazing Friends. Four or five episodes were produced before Vitello was assigned to the project; he later edited those earlier episodes to address quality issues, though they do not fully reflect the standard of his subsequent work on the series. Before Vitello's involvement, continuity errors and excessive use of stock footage were common.

Artists Larry Houston, Rick Hoberg, and Hank Tucker worked with Vitello on the series. Larry Houston had been with Marvel Productions from the studio's inception, working on the solo Spider-Man series as its first project before continuing with subsequent Marvel Productions series. Houston recalled inserting references to other Marvel characters into the series, including a scene in which a television visible in the background was changed from showing a soap opera to depicting members of The Avengers — specifically Scarlet Witch, Captain America, Iron Man, Thor and the Vision — battling an unnamed enemy.

Hoberg joined the production after one or two episodes had been completed, serving as the series' principal character designer. He designed Marvel characters appearing in the series as faithfully as possible to their comic book counterparts, working alongside Houston and Will Meugniot to advocate for accuracy to the source material.

According to Marks, when he joined Marvel Productions the solo series was already partially completed, with Larry Parr as the principal writer at that stage; Marks undertook substantial story editing of Parr's scripts during this period. Writer Donald F. Glut noted that the syndicated series was subject to fewer broadcast standards restrictions than the network Amazing Friends series, allowing for story elements such as the depiction of guns not permitted on Saturday morning network television. This observation was corroborated independently by Hoberg and by layout artist Boyd Kirkland, both of whom noted the solo series had greater fidelity to the comic book source material than the network series.

Among the production details documented by Korkis in Comics Feature #22 was the storyboarding of the episode "Arsenic and Aunt May" by Larry Houston, who ensured that several key poses in the episode's final confrontation were exact restagings of Steve Ditko's artwork from Spider-Man's debut in Amazing Fantasy #15.

=== Character designs ===
The character design for Peter Parker (as well as other supporting characters including Aunt May and J. Jonah Jameson) was quite faithful to the comic books of the period and hearkened back to the illustrations by John Romita Sr. of the young hero in Spider-Man's newspaper strip adventures from the 1970s. Due to network constraints and demands from parents, characters such as Spider-Man were not allowed to make a fist to strike an opponent, but the show's creators managed to conceal these issues with a focus on action and relatively fluid animation.

Much like the Spider-Man newspaper strip of the late 1970s, Peter Parker's character design did away with the 1960s crew cut for a more modern hairstyle during this time, which the character continued to be portrayed with through the 1980s and early 1990s. Likewise, Parker abandoned the conservative suit and tie of the 1960s comics and previous animated series in favor of dark blue straight-legged linen pants.

Peter's mask was connected to his costume at the back of the neck, like a hood which he would pull over his head when he changed into Spider-Man.

=== Distribution ===
Although the series had been completed by the end of 1981, it did not air that year. The earliest known trade advertisement for the series, published in March 1982, offered it for syndication alongside episodes of the 1967 Spider-Man series by ARP Films, describing it as "New for '82." A contemporary article in Comics Feature #22, cover-dated December 1982, confirmed that the series had still not aired at the time of writing, describing it as "The Animated Spider-Man Series You May Never Get to See." Early sales of the series into syndication appear to have been sluggish, as ARP Films returned to the annual NATPE convention in March 1983 to offer the series again, still described as new. The series is known to have aired in at least some markets by 1983–84, though the fragmented nature of syndicated television distribution means no single national premiere date can be established.

ARP Films had distributed Marvel's animated properties since 1968, initially under an agreement with Krantz Films, Marvel's previous animation partner. A new distribution agreement was reached in September 1976, under which ARP held rights to distribute Marvel's animated properties, with a separate commission-based agreement covering the 1981 Spider-Man series specifically.

Beginning in 1981, Marvel began licensing its animated properties for home videocassette distribution through third parties. ARP confronted Marvel with a claim in 1982 that their existing agreement granted them the exclusive right to distribute Marvel's films on videocassette, a dispute that mounted throughout the mid-1980s as Marvel continued to license home video releases including the Marvel Comics Video Library, released by Prism Entertainment beginning in 1985, which included episodes from this series alongside episodes from other Marvel animated properties. This ultimately led to legal action commenced by ARP in July 1986, claiming that Marvel had licensed its animated properties for videocassette distribution in violation of ARP's exclusive rights. Marvel attempted to terminate the distribution agreement on November 12, 1986, and again on September 2, 1987, the latter date subsequently upheld by the courts as the agreement's termination date.

Following a six-week jury trial, the jury found that ARP held videocassette distribution rights under the 1976 agreement and awarded ARP $1,220,000 in damages for Marvel's breach of contract, while also awarding Marvel $137,000 for ARP's own contractual breaches. The termination of the ARP agreement allowed the series to achieve its first wide broadcast distribution as part of the Marvel Action Universe, a syndicated cartoon block that premiered the weekend of October 1–2, 1988.

=== Distribution titles ===
The series' identical on-screen title to the 1967 Spider-Man series it was syndicated alongside created practical difficulties in differentiating the two series for prospective buyers and viewers alike. For distribution purposes, the series was offered under the title "New Spider-Man" by 1983, a designation consistent with the series having been marketed as "New for '82" in trade advertisements the previous year.

By 1992, the series was being offered under the title "Spider-Man 5000" by New World Television at the annual NATPE convention, a reference to the series' production code of "5000," as distinct from the production code "6000" assigned to Spider-Man and His Amazing Friends. The "5000" designation never appeared on the series' title screen and was solely a distribution identifier. It was subsequently adopted as the official retail title for the series' UK DVD releases by Clear Vision in 2010, to avoid confusion with other Spider-Man DVD titles then available.

The series is commonly referred to by fans and researchers as the "1981 Spider-Man cartoon" or "1981 solo Spider-Man cartoon" to distinguish it from Spider-Man and His Amazing Friends, which premiered on NBC on September 12, 1981, the same year the solo series was produced but before it achieved broadcast distribution.

== Broadcast and home media release ==
As was the case with Amazing Friends, the series was later re-aired in the late 1980s as part of the 90-minute Marvel Action Universe, a syndicated series that was used as a platform for old and new Marvel-produced animated fare (the newer programming featured RoboCop: The Animated Series, Dino-Riders and on occasion, X-Men: Pryde of the X-Men, which was intended to serve as a pilot for a potential X-Men animated series). The show was last rerun in the United States in 1998 as part of the UPN Kids Action Zone block alongside several other Marvel shows.

=== Region 1 ===
==== VHS and Beta ====
Episodes of the series were released on VHS and Betamax by Prism Entertainment as part of their Marvel Comics Video Library, the first eighteen volumes of which were released on September 17, 1985, with a further six volumes released in 1986. Eleven of those volumes contained episodes from this series. Prism also released a standalone compilation tape entitled Dr. Doom Conquers the World, which combined four episodes of the Doom saga — "The Doctor Prescribes Doom", "Canon of Doom", "The Doom Report", and "Countdown to Doom" — into a single feature. According to Larry Parr, the writer of the Doom saga episodes, this compilation was at one point intended for theatrical distribution in Europe and domestic television movie syndication.

GoldStar Video released one episode of the series on VHS in 1991:

- "Lizards, Lizards, Everywhere"

Best Film & Video Corp. released ten individual episode tapes and one compilation under the title The Amazing Spider-Man between 1991 and 1995:

- The Amazing Spider-Man, Vol. 1: "Dr. Doom, Master of the World" (1991)
- The Amazing Spider-Man, Vol. 2: "Curiosity Killed the Spider-Man" (1992)
- The Amazing Spider-Man, Vol. 3: "Revenge of the Green Goblin" (1992)
- The Amazing Spider-Man: "Lizards, Lizards, Everywhere" (1994)
- The Amazing Spider-Man: "The Hunter and the Hunted" (1995)
- The Amazing Spider-Man: "The Incredible Shrinking Spider-Man" (1995)
- The Amazing Spider-Man: "Arsenic and Aunt May" (1995)
- The Amazing Spider-Man: "The Vulture Has Landed" (1995)
- The Amazing Spider-Man: "The Return of the Kingpin" (1995)
- Marvel Matinee (1994) — includes "Bubble, Bubble, Oil and Trouble" alongside episodes from other series

==== DVD ====
In Canada, Morningstar Entertainment released the episode "The Vulture Has Landed" on DVD in the set entitled Spider-Man vs. The Vulture. The set also contains "The Vulture's Prey" and "The Dark Terrors", both from the 1967 Spider-Man TV series. Morningstar also released "Canon of Doom" (on the Fantastic Four vs. Doctor Doom set, included in the Villains Showdown Gift Set that also includes "Spider-Man vs. The Vulture"), although the episode is the Bonus episode on the disc. "Arsenic and Aunt May" was also released in the Heroes box set. All the Morningstar DVDs were mastered from VHS/Betamax copies that were released by Prism Entertainment in 1985 as part of their Marvel Comics Video Library series.

=== Region 2 ===
In April 2008, Liberation Entertainment secured the home media rights to select Marvel shows from Jetix Europe in select European territories, including Spider-Man.

In 2009, Clear Vision took over home media rights, and released the series on DVD on four volumes in the United Kingdom, released on June 7, July 5, August 2, and September 6 of 2010 respectively, with a triple pack releasing in 2011, and a complete series release following on March 11, 2013. The company also released the show's four DVD volumes in Germany. To avoid confusion with other Spider-Man DVD titles, Clear Vision released the show on DVD under the name Spider-Man 5000.

=== Streaming ===
The series was available for streaming on Netflix from 2011 to 2013. The series became available on the Disney+ streaming service at its U.S. launch on November 12, 2019.
