= Modred the Mystic =

- Cover to Marvel Chillers featuring Modred the Mystic #1 (October 1975), art by Gil Kane.

Publication information
- Publisher: Marvel Comics
- First appearance: Marvel Chillers #1 (October 1975)
- Created by: Bill Mantlo; Yong Montano; Marv Wolfman

In-story information
- Alter ego: Modred
- Species: Human
- Place of origin: London, England
- Team affiliations: Darkhold Redeemers
- Notable aliases: Modred the Mystic
- Abilities: Mastery and knowledge of magic

Modred the Mystic is a character appearing in American comic books published by Marvel Comics. Created by Bill Mantlo, Yong Montano, and Marv Wolfman, the character first appeared in Marvel Chillers #1 (October 1975). Mordred is an ancient sorcerer from the 6th century, originating from Arthurian legend. Recognized by Merlin for his magical potential, he chose not to apprentice under him, instead becoming obsessed with the Darkhold, a book of dark magic. This connection made him vulnerable to Chthon, an Elder God who created the Darkhold. Mordred, after millennia in suspended animation, was resurrected in the 20th century. Throughout his various adventures, he alternates between fighting against and serving Chthon, and is characterized as an anti-hero.

== Publication history ==
Modred the Mystic debuted in Marvel Chillers #1 (October 1975), created by Bill Mantlo, Yong Montano, and Marv Wolfman. He appeared in the 1963 The Avengers series.

== Fictional character biography ==
Modred was born outside London, England in the 6th century. He was a sorcerer who served as an apprentice in magic to the wizard Gervasse. Modred was engaged to Gervasse's daughter, Janice, and was set to become the apprentice of the wizard Merlin. However, Merlin had been replaced by an imposter (also known as the Mad Merlin, the Maha Yogi, and Merlin Demonspawn), and Modred and Gervasse knew that "Merlin" needed to be stopped. Seeking power, Modred aimed to master the Darkhold, a book of black magic created by the Elder God Chthon, to use its power for good. The Other, an emissary or avatar of Chthon, offered Modred great power at the cost of his soul. Modred refused until the Other targeted Janice; in order to protect her, Modred offered himself to Chthon. His soul was corrupted, and Gervasse placed him in suspended animation, where he lay for centuries.

Modred is awakened in the modern day by archaeologists Janet Lyton and Grant Whitaker, who lead him to London. There, he is shot by the police and attacked by the Other, who he defeats. However, Mordred is unwittingly possessed by Chthon. For a time, Modred joins the Darkhold Redeemers, a group seeking the pages of the Darkhold.

Modred takes the Scarlet Witch to Chthon's prison inside Mount Wundagore, intending to use her as a host for Chthon. Modred is defeated and Chthon exorcised from him, but he is left mentally damaged, losing his sanity and knowledge of magic. Modred is left under the care of Bova, but wanders off after Bova is injured, seeking to return to England.

The Other's servant, the Dwarf, offers Modred a chance to regain his soul if he would obtain a pure soul for Chthon. Modred agrees, and finds the soul in the form of an ancient holy woman who had been blinded by age. He offers to return her youth and her lost love to her in exchange for her soul. When she agrees, Modred realizes that the woman is his lost love Janice, and she recognizes him as Modred. When the Other attempts to take Janice's soul, Modred gives his own soul up to save hers, though Janice dies while resisting the demon's power.

Modred manages to gather all the pages of the Darkhold, then captures Quicksilver. Using the Darkhold, Modred transfers Chthon into Quicksilver's body. Once the ritual is complete, the power of the Darkhold is transferred into Modred and Chthon is resurrected. However, Modred is confronted by the Avengers and taken down by Iron Man.

== Powers and abilities ==
Modred's powers are a result of the manipulation of the forces of magic, and possession by the demon Chthon. Modred has superhuman stamina and durability. He has the ability to manipulate magical forces for a variety of effects, including levitation, control of the elements, creation of mystic shields and energy projection. Modred has an extensive knowledge of magical lore, particularly the Darkhold.

== Reception ==
Adam Barnhardt of ComicBook.com expressed interest in seeing Modred the Mystic in Agatha All Along. He highlighted the character's connection to Chthon, which was referenced in Doctor Strange in the Multiverse of Madness, suggesting that this link could make Modred a fitting addition to the show's mystical themes.
