= The Incredible Hulk (1982 TV series) =

- Genre: Superhero; Action; Adventure
- Created by: Stan Lee
- Based on: Hulk by: Stan Lee; Jack Kirby
- Voices of: Michael Bell; Bob Holt; Michael Horton; B. J. Ward
- Narrated by: Stan Lee
- Composer: Johnny Douglas
- Original language: English
- No. of seasons: 1
- No. of episodes: 13

Production
- Executive producers: David H. DePatie; Lee Gunther
- Producer: Don Jurwich
- Running time: 24 minutes
- Production company: Marvel Productions

Original release
- Network: NBC
- Release: September 18, 1982 – October 8, 1983

The Incredible Hulk is an American animated television series based on the Marvel Comics character of the same name. The series ran for 13 episodes on NBC in 1982, part of a combined hour with Spider-Man and His Amazing Friends (as The Incredible Hulk and the Amazing Spider-Man).

Compared to the live-action The Incredible Hulk television series from Universal, this series followed the Hulk comic books much more closely, particularly with regard to the Hulk's origin, the supporting cast (though Rio and his only daughter Rita do not appear in the comics), the army base setting, the heavy use of fantastical elements, and the Hulk being capable of speech (albeit limited). The series also retained from the comic book "Bruce Banner" as the name of the Hulk's human identity (rather than "David Banner" as in the live-action series).

This was the second Hulk animated series: in 1966, the Hulk appeared in 13 seven-minute segments as part of TV's The Marvel Super Heroes. The "Spidey Goes Hollywood" episode of Spider-Man and His Amazing Friends, first broadcast in late 1981, served as something of a backdoor pilot for The Incredible Hulk as it guest-starred the version of Bruce Banner/the Hulk that would later feature in the 1982 series.

Ownership of the series passed to Disney in 2001 when Disney acquired Fox Kids Worldwide, which also includes Marvel Productions.

== Plot ==
The series focuses on Bruce Banner attempting to cure himself of his transformations into the Hulk, and the Hulk defeating various monsters and villains whilst fending off the army's attempts to subdue and capture him.

== Production ==
The 1982 Incredible Hulk series featured accompanying narration by Hulk co-creator Stan Lee. Some of the same background music tracks were used for Dungeons & Dragons. Boyd Kirkland, who became a writer/director for Batman: The Animated Series and X-Men: Evolution, was one of the layout artists for The Incredible Hulk.

The character design for both Bruce Banner and the Hulk were based on the artwork of Sal Buscema, who penciled the Incredible Hulk comic during the 1970s and 1980s.

== Characters ==
- Bruce Banner (voiced by Michael Bell): As in the original comic book, Dr Bruce Banner is an extremely intelligent physicist working in Gamma Base; during periods of stress or anger he transforms into the Hulk (voiced by Bob Holt), a large, green-skinned, and muscular humanoid possessing a vast degree of physical strength but limited intelligence. Banner incurred this condition after being caught in the test explosion of a gamma bomb. Banner is depicted as seeking a cure for his condition.
- Rick Jones (voiced by Michael Horton): Here, Rick is blond, wears a cowboy hat, and has a girlfriend named Rita. As in the early years of the comic books, Rick is the sole confidant of Banner's secret that he is actually the Hulk. The series retains from the comic book the plot-point that Rick feels partially responsible for Bruce Banner's condition, as Bruce was caught in an explosion whilst saving Rick, who was trespassing on the gamma bomb test site.
- Betty Ross (voiced by B. J. Ward): In this incarnation, Betty is a research scientist working alongside Bruce Banner at Gamma Base. Like the 1966 series, Betty is unaware that Banner transforms into the Hulk.
- Thunderbolt Ross (voiced by Robert Ridgely): An Army general who antagonizes Hulk due to believing him to be a threat.
- Ned Talbot (voiced by Pat Fraley): An Army major who assists Ross in hunting the Hulk. Unlike his comics counterpart, he is depicted as incompetent and cowardly, for which his troops secretly nickname him "Noodle-head Ned".
- Rio (voiced by Roberto Cruz): Rita's father, a character exclusive to this series; he owns and operates the diner Rio's Ranchero, situated close to Gamma Base. It is clear that Rick had revealed the secret of Bruce to him, whom also tries to help him as he can.
- Rita (voiced by Susan Blu): Rio's daughter and Rick Jones's girlfriend, a character exclusive to this series. It is clear that Rick had revealed the secret of Bruce to her, whom also tries to help him as she can.

== Episodes ==
No.	Title	Written by
1	"Tomb of the Unknown Hulk"	Michael Reaves
When high cosmic ray activity triggers Bruce's transformations without him getting angry, he tries to lock himself in a cave to protect his friends, but the cosmic rays also block communications and gives Doctor Octopus an opening to stage an attack on Gamma Base.
2	"Prisoner of the Monster"	Misty Stewart
Rick stumbles upon a map for a potion held by a lost tribe that can cure Bruce of the Hulk, but the cure becomes bittersweet when the Spymaster kidnaps Betty and her father, stealing a deadly weapon from Gamma Base that only the Hulk can defeat.
3	"Origin of the Hulk"	Dennis Marks
The retelling of the origin of the Hulk, with the original Russian Cold War spies replaced with aliens seeking the secrets of Bruce's Gamma Bomb.
4	"When Monsters Meet"	Arthur Browne Jr.
Arriving in Paris for a scientific conference, Bruce is given a possible cure for his condition, but his chances of using it are threatened by the appearance of a descendant of Quasimodo who wreaks havoc in the city. Note: This episode was adapted into the comic one-shot "The Incredible Hulk versus Quasimodo", which is set in the series' continuity.
5	"The Cyclops Project"	Michael Reaves
Due to the inadvertent actions of the Hulk, Cyclops, the world's most powerful military defense computer, malfunctions and seeks to take over the world. The Cyclops computer tries to obtain the aid of Bruce Banner and the Hulk to do so.
6	"Bruce Banner Unmasked"	Michael Reaves
When the Puppet Master attempts to gain control of the Hulk as a part of his plan to take over Mesa City and its surroundings, the army is finally able to defeat the creature and learn of Bruce Banner's secret identity.
7	"The Creature and The Cavegirl"	Martin Pasko
Bruce learns of a colleague whose developed a working time projector, seeing it as a chance to go back and stop the creation of the Hulk, only for the device to malfunction and transport the lab and its occupants to 1,000,000 B.C.
8	"It Lives! It Grows! It Destroys!"	Fred Ladd
A rival scientist at Gamma Base develops a part plant, part animal lifeform which can eat almost anything in its path. But the creature escapes and threatens the planet as it grows uncontrollably.
9	"The Incredible Shrinking Hulk"	Arthur Browne Jr.
After his latest gamma experiment malfunctions, Bruce is shrunk down until he is one inch tall, as two spies attempt to steal a new tank.
10	"Punks on Wheels"	Paul Dini
When a motorcycle gang kidnaps Rita, Bruce and his friend discover the gang is secretly working for the Leader, who seeks their aid in stealing vibranium.
11	"Enter: She-Hulk"	Michael Reaves
Bruce and Rick travel to Los Angeles to visit Bruce's cousin Jennifer Walters to try to learn how she is able to maintain her intelligence when she changes into the She-Hulk, but their attempt is endangered thanks to the efforts of terrorist group Hydra trying to take over the city.
12	"The Boy Who Saw Tomorrow"	Michael Reaves
Betty's nephew Jonah arrives at Gamma Base to demonstrate his amazing psychic ability, able to predict the future with uncanny accuracy he has a vision of Betty's space shuttle crashing into a mountain, with the Hulk and a mysterious madman involved.
13	"The Hulk Destroys Bruce Banner"	Michael Reaves; Marc Scott Zicree
While testing his new Transmat teleporter on himself, Bruce transforms into the Hulk mid-teleportation, convincing Betty that the Hulk interfered. She then leads the charge to capture the Hulk and save Bruce.

== Marvel Mash-Up ==
Scenes from Spider-Man and His Amazing Friends and The Incredible Hulk were re-cut, edited, and re-dubbed into comical shorts as part of Disney XD's Marvel Mash-Up shorts for their "Marvel Universe on Disney XD" block of programming that includes Ultimate Spider-Man and The Avengers: Earth's Mightiest Heroes.

== Home media ==
In April 2008, Liberation Entertainment secured the home media rights to select Marvel shows from Jetix Europe in select European territories, including The Incredible Hulk. A two-disc boxset of the series was due out for August but was delayed until October due to unforeseen circumstances before being fully released on November 3 through Lace International, after Liberation shuttered their UK division at the end of October. The DVD contains all the episodes produced, as well as a short restoration featurette.

Clear Vision later took over rights and re-released the complete series on DVD in the United Kingdom on June 7, 2010 and in Germany on June 14, 2010.
