= Lee Gunther =

American film editor

- Born: May 30, 1935; Los Angeles County, California, United States
- Died: August 25, 1998 (aged 63); Woodland Hills, California, United States
- Occupations: Film editor, co-founder
- Years active: 1963–1998

Lee Gunther (May 30, 1935 – August 25, 1998) was a co-founder of Marvel Productions and a film editor (which, in animation parlance, means sound effects editor) on more than 85 animated shorts in all.

== Career ==
Starting at Warner Bros. Cartoons in the 1960s, and then at DePatie–Freleng Enterprises, he also worked as a production manager in the 1970s. After DePatie–Freleng was sold to Marvel Comics Group in 1981, Gunther became one of the founders of Marvel Productions Ltd., where he served as executive vice president and executive producer on television series such as Spider-Man, G.I. Joe and The Transformers, as well as the feature-length animation Inhumanoids: The Movie. He also served as vice president of foreign production at Fox Kids.

After Marvel, he had a short stay at Sullivan Bluth Studios, then Warner Bros. Animation, after Sullivan Bluth's TV arm faltered, then in June 1990, he left Warner Bros. Animation, to co-founded Gunther-Wahl Productions with Michael Wahl, who also worked for Marvel Productions during Gunther's time. He then served as executive producer of the animated series The Angry Beavers for Nickelodeon from 1997 to 2001 and Wild West C.O.W.-Boys of Moo Mesa for Greengrass Productions and King World Productions on ABC in 1992. He and Wahl also created The Adventures of T-Rex in 1992-1993, shortly after the Mattel Flutter Faeries lawsuit in which his partner Wahl and his wife were involved.

Other productions by Gunther-Wahl included G.I. Joe Extreme (with Sunbow Entertainment and Graz Entertainment from 1995 to 1997), and the cartoon Red Planet in 1994.

In his lifetime, Gunther earned four Emmy awards, two Humanitas Prizes, two Golden Reel Awards and 12 Clio awards.

== Death ==
Gunther died of a stroke on August 25, 1998, at age 63. Long-time friend and colleague George Conte, who worked for Murakami-Wolf-Swenson and Fred Wolf Films, and who first met Gunther at DePatie–Freleng, said, "Lee's dedication to quality filmmaking, both technically and creatively placed him at the top of his profession. Because of his strong character and gentle ways, he was respected and loved by all who knew him. He will be missed."
