= List of Lost in Space episodes =

This article provides a list of episodes of the television series Lost in Space.

== Series overview ==
| Season | Episodes | Originally aired | |
| Season | Episodes | First aired | Last aired |
|---|---|---|---|
| Pilot | 1 | Unaired | |
| 1 | 29 | September 15, 1965 | April 27, 1966 |
| 2 | 30 | September 14, 1966 | April 26, 1967 |
| 3 | 24 | September 6, 1967 | March 6, 1968 |

== Original pilot ==
| Title | Directed by | Written by | Original release date |
|---|---|---|---|
| "No Place to Hide" | Irwin Allen | T : Shimon Wincelberg; S/T : Irwin Allen | Unaired |
In the year 1997, the Robinson family leaves Earth in the Gemini 12 spaceship and sets out on a journey to be the first humans to colonize Alpha Centauri. Disaster strikes when their ship encounters a meteor storm, veers off course and crash-lands on an alien planet. By December 2001, after a delayed revival from suspended animation, the family has settled in over a six-month period and made the planet their home, but a severe winter is coming and they must journey south. Traveling in their all-terrain "chariot," the family encounters fearsome cyclopean monsters, survives a stormy sea, and explores the cave of an ancient civilization. Eventually they find a tropical region and set up a camp, but unbeknownst to them they are being observed by a pair of humanoid aliens. Guest stars: Don Forbes (TV Commentator), Ford Rainey (The President), Lamar Lundy (The Giant) No Place to Hide was colorized and appears as an extra on the Netflix Lost in Space Season 1 June 4, 2019 Blu-ray release. Note: The characters of Dr. Zachary Smith and the Robot were not in the original pilot. Much of the footage from this episode was reused in the first five official series episodes.

== Episodes ==
=== Season 1 (1965–66) ===
All episodes in black-and-white

| No. overall | No. in season | Title | Directed by | Written by | Original release date |
|---|---|---|---|---|---|
| 1 | 1 | "The Reluctant Stowaway" | Anton M. Leader | S. Bar-David | September 15, 1965 |
On October 16, 1997 at about 8PM ET, the Robinson family departs from the USA's Alpha Control in the Jupiter 2 spaceship to colonize Alpha Centauri, but Dr. Zachary Smith (Jonathan Harris), working as a saboteur for a foreign government, rigs the environmental control robot to destroy the ship's control systems within hours after take off. Events lead to Smith being trapped aboard the doomed ship, which encounters a meteor storm and veers light years off course. Soon, the robot becomes active and does further damage before it can be stopped. Later, Professor John Robinson (Guy Williams) tries to fix the ship's sensor systems but must go outside the craft to perform the repairs. He becomes untethered and his wife Maureen goes out to help him. Guest star: Hoke Howell (Sgt. Rogers) Note: This episode is the first regular pilot of the series. It was nominated in 1966 for, but did not win, an Emmy award for Individual Achievements in Cinematography - Special.
| 2 | 2 | "The Derelict" | Alexander Singer | S : S. Bar-David; T : Peter Packer | September 22, 1965 |
Maureen saves her husband and he makes the repairs to the ship, but an approaching comet heats the hull of the Jupiter 2 and the hatch door becomes stuck. Major West forces the door open and saves the couple. The crew then finds a large alien ship which pulls the Jupiter 2 inside. The Professor, West and Dr Smith explore the ship and try to figure out the craft's advanced navigation system in hopes of locating Earth. Smith ventures off alone, believing the ship to be owned by his foreign government employers. Meanwhile, young Will Robinson ventures onto the alien ship and meets an alien creature. Smith stumbles upon Will trying to communicate with the alien but hastily shoots it with a laser gun. More aliens appear and the furious creatures chase everyone back to the Jupiter 2 which forces its way out of the alien ship to safety. Note: The voice reading Shakespeare belongs to an uncredited Richard Basehart, then starring in Allen's other current series Voyage to the Bottom of the Sea.
| 3 | 3 | "Island in the Sky" | Anton M. Leader | S : S. Bar-David; T : Norman Lessing | September 29, 1965 |
The family finds a planet able to support human life and the Professor feels they should land there. He decides to first check out the planet himself and goes off in a spacesuit with forearm mounted "Para-Jet" thrusters. The thrusters malfunction and contact is lost. Major West tries to land on the planet, but Dr. Smith demands they return to Earth and uses the reprogrammed robot to force his authority. West manages to subdue Smith but the Jupiter 2 falls from orbit and crashes on the planet. With everyone safe, West leads a mission in the Chariot to find the Professor. Meanwhile, Smith schemes a plan to escape the planet and orders the robot to eliminate all "non-essential personnel." Note: Some of this episode reuses footage from the original pilot "No Place To Hide".
| 4 | 4 | "There Were Giants in the Earth" | Leo Penn | S : S. Bar-David; T : Carey Wilber | October 6, 1965 |
The Robinsons begin to make themselves at home on the strange alien world, growing plants and herding local animals for food. After checking a meteorological station, the professor learns that a severe cold front is coming which will drop the temperature to lethal levels. To make matters worse, the professor and Major West are attacked by a giant cyclopean creature that lurks in the area. The family decides to abandon the Jupiter 2 and head south to a warmer climate, but Dr. Smith refuses to go with them. Journeying in the Chariot, the family seeks shelter from a freak lightning storm inside a cave. There they find, and explore, ruins of a past civilization. Note: Much of this episode again reuses footage from the original pilot "No Place to Hide".
| 5 | 5 | "The Hungry Sea" | Sobey Martin | S : S. Bar-David; T : William Welch | October 13, 1965 |
The Robinsons continue their journey south where they encounter a frozen sea and drive across the ice. Back at the Jupiter 2, Dr. Smith deals with the severe cold, but just when he's about to freeze solid the temperature begins to swiftly rise. The robot computes that the planet is in a peculiar orbit around its star and will eventually become superheated. Now at risk of burning up, Smith sends the Robot to find and warn the Robinsons, but when it arrives, Major West shoots it with a laser thinking Smith sent it to harm them. West's hasty decision puts him at odds with the Professor and tempers flare along with the blazing heat wave. Heading back to the ship, the amphibious Chariot must cross a now-thawed and rough sea. Note: Like the previous episode, some of this episode reuses footage from the original pilot "No Place to Hide".
| 6 | 6 | "Welcome Stranger" | Alvin Ganzer | Peter Packer | October 20, 1965 |
Will listens in to radio energies from space, but after Professor Robinson warns him that the frequencies could attract harmful energy from a storm, Smith misunderstands the explanation, fears an invader, and spots one on the radar scope. Will's outgoing signals were intercepted by a passing rocket ship that lands nearby. Appearing from the craft is a cowboy hat-wearing astronaut named Jimmy Hapgood. He explains he launched from Earth to Saturn in 1982, but veered off course when his guidance system failed and he has been lost in space ever since. Dr. Smith offers Hapgood the guidance system from the Robot as a gesture of good faith (but to enable Hapgood to give Smith a ride back to Earth). Meanwhile, the Professor and Maureen make a critical decision – knowing Hapgood's capsule, Traveling Man, can carry two more passengers, they ask him to take Will and Penny off the dangerous planet and back with him to Earth. Hapgood refuses to accept the responsibility and Dr. Smith tries to weasel his way into the passenger seat. Guest star: Warren Oates (Jimmy Hapgood)
| 7 | 7 | "My Friend, Mr. Nobody" | Paul Stanley | Jackson Gillis | October 27, 1965 |
Penny finds a cave where she is greeted by a curious voice that draws her inside to play. Later, she returns to the ship with stories of her new friend, "Mr. Nobody", who gave her shiny crystals as gifts. When Dr. Smith realizes the crystals are really diamonds, he tails Penny to the cave but is unable to get inside. He then tricks Major West into helping him blast the cavern open. Penny learns of the scheme and fears the blast could hurt her friend, but she is too late to warn him and is caught in a cave in when the explosives go off. Thinking Penny is dead, the formless entity threatens to punish those who have hurt her with a powerful wrath. Note: This was the last episode to be scored by John Williams. (Williams also composed original scores for "The Reluctant Stowaway," "Island in the Sky" and "The Hungry Sea".)
| 8 | 8 | "Invaders from the Fifth Dimension" | Leonard Horn | S. Bar-David | November 3, 1965 |
Dr. Smith is beamed onto an alien ship that is bigger on the inside than on the outside. There, two mouthless, floating heads tell him of their need for a replacement computer, but their technology requires the direct use of a human brain. After detecting treachery in Smith's mind, the aliens decide his brain is unreliable — much to Smith's relief — but they force him to provide them with another brain and fit him with a control collar which will kill him if he doesn't comply. To save his own neck, Smith decides to hand young Will over to the aliens and cons the boy into entering their ship. Meanwhile, the Robinsons come looking for their son and must save him before the aliens take him away.
| 9 | 9 | "The Oasis" | Sutton Roley | Peter Packer | November 10, 1965 |
While enduring another heat wave, the Robinsons try to conserve their dwindling supply of drinking water, but Dr. Smith selfishly uses the last of it for a shower. In their desperate search for more water, they find some delicious-looking fruit growing in an oasis and take it back to the ship. Smith however, finds the fruit and eats it before making sure it's safe. He then fears that he has been deliberately poisoned, accuses the Robinsons of trying to kill him and he runs away. As the men search for Smith, Penny's little pet Bloop, Debbie, eats some of the fruit and grows to a human size. Likewise, Smith is found to have grown to a giant size and he threatens to crush the Robinsons in revenge for what he thinks they did to him.
| 10 | 10 | "The Sky Is Falling" | Sobey Martin | T : Barney Slater; S/T : Herman Groves | November 17, 1965 |
An alien family, the Taurons, land on the Robinsons' planet and set up a camp nearby. Meanwhile, Dr. Smith is approached by the alien's scout robot, but he considers it an attack and thinks their new neighbors are hostile. Problems arise when attempts to communicate with the aliens become futile because they do not speak verbally. Later, Will encounters the aliens' playful child, but the boy suddenly falls ill and Will takes him to a cave to rest. When the two boys do not return to their respective camps, the aliens and the Robinsons begin to suspect each other of foul play which could lead to a potentially deadly confrontation if the children are not found. Guest stars: Don Matheson (Rethso), Francoise Ruggieri (Moela)
| 11 | 11 | "Wish Upon a Star" | Sutton Roley | Barney Slater | November 24, 1965 |
Major West is nearly killed when Dr. Smith causes an explosion, and a fed-up Professor thinks it is best if he leaves. Dejected, Smith heads off, but he is followed by Will who feels sorry for him. Smith and Will then find the wreckage of an alien spaceship and a mysterious machine that creates anything they wish for. Word of the magical machine reaches the Robinsons who want to use the device as well, but their eventual greed forces the Professor to get rid of it. Refusing to destroy it, Smith takes it back to the alien ship, which he "redecorates", but then he summons a servant to tend to his needs. Instead, a menacing mummylike creature appears who tries to take the machine away. Guest star: Dawson Palmer (Rubberoid)
| 12 | 12 | "The Raft" | Sobey Martin | Peter Packer | December 1, 1965 |
Major West and the Professor build a one-man space capsule in an attempt to reach help, but when Dr. Smith tampers with the ship, he and Will are accidentally launched into space. The two eventually land on a planet that Smith is convinced is Earth, but Will is not so certain. Will's fears are confirmed when they are captured by a strange plantlike monster that forces them to tend its garden. Meanwhile, the Robinsons pick up the capsule's signal and confirm it is still on their planet. West and the Professor begin a search to find the Doctor and the boy.
| 13 | 13 | "One of Our Dogs is Missing" | Sutton Roley | William Welch | December 8, 1965 |
After a violent meteor shower, the women and Dr. Smith find the wreck of a spaceship, but whatever was aboard sneaks onto the Jupiter 2 and raids the food supply. Soon, a little dog makes an appearance, but Smith believes it is a hostile alien in disguise. Meanwhile, a hairy creature spies on the camp and the dog chases after it, but Smith believes the "alien" canine left to summon an invasion force. As Smith arms himself for war, Judy goes out to look for the dog unaware that the monster is tracking her down.
| 14 | 14 | "Attack of the Monster Plants" | Justus Addiss | William Read Woodfield & Allan Balter | December 15, 1965 |
The Professor and Major West become trapped in quicksand and the cowardly Dr. Smith refuses to help them. Once safe, Don threatens to leave Smith behind once they've drilled enough deutronium fuel to take off. To secure his passage off-world, Smith attempts to steal the fuel, but he soon finds a strange plant which duplicates anything that is put inside its flower — including a canister of fuel. Smith then returns with more than enough fuel for everyone to return to Earth, but the duplicate canister is found to be made of useless vegetable matter. Meanwhile, having absorbed the deutronium, the flowers grow to enormous size and spread everywhere. Attracted by their beauty, Judy is lured closer to a flower, lays down on it and it closes its petals over her. Later, a plant-controlled clone of Judy appears who steals the rest of the fuel and threatens to kill the real Judy if the Robinsons don't provide more fuel for the hungry plants.
| 15 | 15 | "Return from Outer Space" | Nathan Juran | Peter Packer | December 29, 1965 |
Penny, Will and Dr. Smith find an alien machine that beams Penny and her pet Bloop away, but Will manages to bring them back. Despite the Professor telling him to stay away from the machine, Will becomes obsessed with fixing it and has the Robot beam him to Earth. Will arrives in a small Vermont town and he tries to contact Alpha Control, but the locals who help him don't buy his stories of being from the Jupiter 2 mission. Back on the alien world (which Will calls "Priplanus"), the Robot stands by to bring Will back, but Dr. Smith reprograms him for another task which appears destined to strand Will on Earth. In this episode, minutes 9 to 10 Robot recites the Scout Law to Dr Smith. -"A Scout is trustworthy, loyal, helpful, friendly, courteous, kind, obedient, cheerful, thrifty, brave, clean, and reverent."- Guest stars: Reta Shaw (Aunt Clara), Walter Sande (Sheriff Baxendale), Donald Losby (Davey Sims), Sheila Allen (Ruth Templeton [as Sheila Mathews]), Helen Kleeb (Phone Operator Rachel), Robert Easton (Lacy), Harry Harvey, Sr. (Grover), Ann Dore (First Select-Person), Keith Taylor (Theodore), Johnny Tuchy (First Boy)
| 16 | 16 | "The Keeper: Part 1" | Sobey Martin | Barney Slater | January 12, 1966 |
Dr. Smith falls into a trance and walks into a glass cage where a monster comes and attacks him. A mysterious man suddenly appears and teleports the creature away. Later the man approaches the Robinsons and identifies himself as "The Keeper" — a collector of creature specimens from across the galaxy. It soon becomes clear that The Keeper plans to add members of the family to his exhibition when he asks Major West and Judy to come with him. Dr. Smith however, asks the alien for a ride to Earth where he can find all the humans he wants, but The Keeper has no interest and turns his sights on Will and Penny. Using the mesmerizing power of a strange staff, The Keeper tries to lure the children onto his spaceship and into cages. Guest stars: Michael Rennie (Keeper) Note: Michael Rennie and Jonathan Harris previously starred in The Third Man (TV series) as Harry Lime and Bradford Webster respectively.
| 17 | 17 | "The Keeper: Part 2" | Harry Harris | Barney Slater | January 19, 1966 |
Continuing the story from the last episode: Dr. Smith and the Robot sneak aboard The Keeper's ship where Smith tampers with the control systems and unwittingly releases a horde of monsters that escape onto the planet. Furious, The Keeper demands the Robinsons hand over Will and Penny, or he will let his creatures remain free to tear them apart. Both the Professor and Maureen, as well as Major West and Judy, offer themselves in their place, but The Keeper refuses them. Soon, The Keeper is injured during the escape of his most hideous monster and the Robinsons are left to deal with the beast themselves. Guest star: Michael Rennie (Keeper)
| 18 | 18 | "The Sky Pirate" | Sobey Martin | Carey Wilber | January 26, 1966 |
While the Professor and Major West investigate a landed alien ship, Will and Dr. Smith are captured by a pirate named Tucker and his mechanical parrot Nick. Smith has the Robot attack the pirate who runs off with Will as his prisoner. Will however, quickly befriends Tucker and becomes envious of the pirate life after hearing some of Tucker's exciting tales. Tucker makes Will his first mate and has him swear the pirate oath. Later, Tucker strikes a deal with the Robinsons to return Will unharmed if they help fix his broken ship. The Professor agrees, but soon another ship arrives and releases a bloblike creature that begins stalking Tucker for his treasure – a device that forecasts the future. Guest star: Albert Salmi (Alonzo P. Tucker)
| 19 | 19 | "Ghost in Space" | Don Richardson | Peter Packer | February 2, 1966 |
While drilling for fuel, Dr. Smith sets off an explosive in the wrong part of a bog and unleashes an invisible presence that begins prowling around. Later, Smith makes a ouija board and conducts a séance to contact his deceased Uncle Thaddeus. During the ceremony, the unseen force arrives and rampages around the Robinsons' camp leaving Smith believing it is the angry ghost of his uncle. When it is discovered that the entity can be trapped, and leaves behind three-toed footprints, the Professor and Major West believe it is something more real than supernatural – a dimensional creature that feeds off raw energy, and it is hungry for the Jupiter 2's vital power reserves.
| 20 | 20 | "War of the Robots" | Sobey Martin | Barney Slater | February 9, 1966 |
Will and the robot stumble upon another robot. More capable than their own robot, the alien robot works to gain the confidence of the Robinsons. At a critical point, the alien robot plans to disarm the Robinsons so that its master can come to take them as specimens for experiments. Note: Penny Robinson (Angela Cartwright) does not appear in this episode until the episode-ending cliffhanger.
| 21 | 21 | "The Magic Mirror" | Nathan Juran | Jackson Gillis | February 16, 1966 |
Seeking shelter from a storm, Penny and Dr. Smith find a large mirror with a frame made of platinum and Smith becomes obsessed with its potential value. After her pet bloop Debbie enters the mirror and returns with a bell, Smith not believing his eyes, he then watches as Penny accidentally falls inside the mirror and into a pocket dimension. There, she meets a young boy who tells her that behind the mirror they can always have fun and stay as children forever. Penny, however, desperately tries to get out, and to make matters worse a hideous creature begins to stalk her. Outside, Dr. Smith tries to dismantle the mirror, not knowing he could trap Penny inside forever. Guest star: Michael J. Pollard (The Boy) Note: Will Robinson (Billy Mumy) does not appear in this episode until the episode-ending cliffhanger.
| 22 | 22 | "The Challenge" | Don Richardson | Barney Slater | March 2, 1966 |
Will and Dr. Smith are confronted by a young boy named Quano who is from a race of disciplined warriors. He explains he has been put on the Robinsons' hostile planet to prove his bravery, because one day he will take his father's place as ruler of his people. As part of his test, he is to challenge someone to a contest of strength and skill and he picks Will as his opponent. Meanwhile, Dr. Smith eavesdrops on Quano and his father and learns that if Will beats him the father will cover up his humiliating failure by destroying any witnesses – i.e., the Robinsons. Smith then tries to strike a deal with Quano to ensure Will fails the contest in exchange for a ride back to Earth. Guest stars: Michael Ansara (The Ruler), Kurt Russell (Quano)
| 23 | 23 | "The Space Trader" | Nathan Juran | Barney Slater | March 9, 1966 |
A freak storm destroys the Robinsons' garden and condenser unit, forcing the family to ration protein pills. Dr. Smith and Will soon find a series of alien advertising signs which lead them to an outdoor bazaar run by a space trader. The trader shows them incredible wares and tasty food from around the galaxy, but the greedy businessman's prices are too high for the Robinsons who require every vital piece of equipment they have. Dr. Smith, on the other hand, is willing to trade anything for a decent meal, including the Robot. Learning of the unauthorized sale, the Professor orders Smith to get the Robot back, and in doing so, the trader tricks the doctor into signing himself over as a slave. When the Robinsons learn the merchant has a weather-controlling machine, they realize they have been swindled and try to get Dr. Smith back. Guest star: Torin Thatcher (Trader)
| 24 | 24 | "His Majesty Smith" | Harry Harris | Carey Wilber | March 16, 1966 |
Will finds a golden crown and, putting it on, he summons an entourage of people who hail him as the new king of the planet Andronica. The aliens explain they leave a crown out in the open whenever they need a new leader and whoever finds it gets the job. Believing the position is too much for a boy, Smith convinces Will to surrender the crown to him. Smith gets the royal treatment but soon discovers his subjects are androids under the control of a scientist whose people regularly select an alien as a king for a sacrifice ceremony; the alien considers Smith a suitable choice, ridding the galaxy of a useless being. In the meantime, the alien makes a good-natured clone of Smith whose kindness and hard work cause the Robinsons to suspect something isn't right and the real Smith must be in grave danger. Guest stars: Liam Sullivan (Nexus), Kevin Hagen (The Master)
| 25 | 25 | "The Space Croppers" | Sobey Martin | Peter Packer | March 30, 1966 |
Will, Penny and Dr. Smith are attacked by a werewolf and they set out to track the beast down. The footprints lead them to a family of hillbilly farmers who seem to worship the strange plants they raise. A feud begins to brew when the Robinsons learn the aliens are stealing equipment, and Judy becomes jealous when the farmer's daughter Effra flirts with Don. Meanwhile, Smith courts the mother, Sybilla, and proposes to her, but only to weasel a ride back to Earth. Soon however, Smith becomes horrified when he learns Sybilla and her daughter are witches and his future stepson Keel shapeshifts into the same hairy beast under a full moon. Note: Sherry Jackson and Angela Cartwright previously starred in The Danny Thomas Show. Guest stars: Mercedes McCambridge (Sybilla), Sherry Jackson (Effra), Dawson Palmer (Keel/Werewolf)
| 26 | 26 | "All That Glitters" | Harry Harris | Barney Slater | April 6, 1966 |
Penny encounters an interstellar fugitive named Ohan whom she helps, and he gives her a talking disc that leads to a great treasure. Soon a galactic lawman named Bolix arrives looking for Ohan, but the disc is what he's really after. Smith learns of the disc and follows it to the treasure – a box containing a metal collar that turns anything he touches into pure platinum. Smith's Midas touch quickly becomes a curse when the collar will not come off and he accidentally turns Penny into a platinum statue. Guest stars: Werner Klemperer (Bolix), Larry Ward (Ohan)
| 27 | 27 | "The Lost Civilization" | Don Richardson | William Welch | April 13, 1966 |
During a search for water, the Professor, Major West, Will and the Robot take shelter from the heat by entering a cave. Soon an earthquake hits, and Will and the Robot fall down a pit that leads to an underground world. Will finds a little sleeping princess and he awakens her with a kiss. Once awake, she insists Will come with her to her people. The Professor and West try to find Will and the Robot, but they are captured by a group of soldiers and brought to where the princess took Will: the remains of an ancient city deep inside the caverns. The princess' "Major Domo" tells Will that he will fulfill a thousand-year-old prophecy where he becomes her consort and she leads an invasion army that will take over the universe – starting with the planet of the "brave man" who woke the princess, in this case, Earth. Guest stars: Kym Karath (Princess), Royal Dano (Major Domo) Note: Kym Karath and Angela Cartwright previously starred in The Sound of Music as Gretl von Trapp and Brigitta von Trapp respectively.
| 28 | 28 | "A Change of Space" | Sobey Martin | Peter Packer | April 20, 1966 |
Will and Dr. Smith find a strange alien spaceship that the Robot states is capable of traveling anywhere in the universe. Later, Will goes inside the craft, but the hatch closes and the ship takes him on a wild ride into the sixth dimension. Mutated by exposure to the cosmic forces, Will returns with superhuman intelligence. Hoping a ride in the ship will give him similar mental prowess, Smith takes off next, but he instead returns as a fragile old man and blames Will for his predicament. Will then uses his advanced intellect to find a way to revert Smith's condition, but soon a scaly alien arrives angry that his ship has been tampered with.
| 29 | 29 | "Follow the Leader" | Don Richardson | Barney Slater | April 27, 1966 |
While exploring a cave containing ancient artifacts, the Professor finds a tomb and encounters a ghostly entity named Canto (voiced by Gregory Morton) who slowly possesses his mind. When he returns to the ship, he exhibits hostility and fatigue which Dr. Smith believes is the beginning of a mental breakdown. Meanwhile, the entity gives the Professor the technical knowledge to repair the Jupiter 2 so it can leave the planet. Once the family learns their father may be under the influence of an alien, they try to stop him, but time is running out as the being's control over their father grows stronger. Note: This is the first episode of the series that was partially in color. The cliffhanger ending to this story was that from the episode "One of Our Dogs is Missing" (leading to the episode "Attack of the Monster Plants") as the series now went into summer reruns. Some syndication prints remove that cliffhanger and instead use the one seen at the end of the second season episode "The Galaxy Gift" (leading to the summer rerun of the first color episode "Blast Off into Space".)

=== Season 2 (1966–67) ===
All episodes in Seasons 2 and 3 filmed in color

| No. overall | No. in season | Title | Directed by | Written by | Original release date |
|---|---|---|---|---|---|
| 30 | 1 | "Blast Off into Space" | Nathan Juran | Peter Packer | September 14, 1966 |
Dr. Smith and Will encounter an intergalactic prospector named Nerim who is mining for cosmonium, a substance he claims is the most valuable material in the universe and that it contains the force of life. Unfortunately, Nerim's subterranean blasting has caused the core of the planet to become unstable and the Robinsons rush to get the Jupiter 2 ready for departure. Meanwhile, Smith plays a card game with Nerim and gambles for some of the cosmonium, but instead he ends up losing a vital component for the Jupiter 2 which could hinder the Robinsons' escape. Guest star: Strother Martin (Nerim) Note: This is the first episode of the series that was entirely in color.
| 31 | 2 | "Wild Adventure" | Don Richardson | William Read Woodfield & Allan Balter | September 21, 1966 |
Claiming he has found the way to Earth, Dr. Smith tampers with the navigation controls and inadvertently dumps all the Jupiter 2's reserve fuel supply. The Professor locates an Earth fuel barge where they refuel. Meanwhile, Smith, who has changed the ship's course back to Earth again by coopting Penny to do it for him, begins to see a beautiful, green-skinned woman floating outside the viewports who sings his name, but no one believes his wild story. When an alarm sounds, they discover they are headed directly at the Sun, and pulling away depletes their fuel, leaving them with no choice but to head to nearby Earth. The girl lures Smith outside the ship. With the little fuel they have left from the barge, hope is shattered when the family is forced to make the decision to save Dr. Smith and miss their chance of returning to Earth. They have a very brief radio contact with Alpha Control, which cannot aid them. Guest star: Vitina Marcus (Lorelei – Her name is changed to Athena when she returns in "The Girl from the Green Dimension").
| 32 | 3 | "The Ghost Planet" | Nathan Juran | Peter Packer | September 28, 1966 |
The Jupiter 2 is pulled down to a strange planet that Dr. Smith believes is Earth. Soon, a friendly voice makes contact and identifies itself as "Space Control", but the Robinsons are suspicious. After landing, they send the Robot out to investigate, but Smith impatiently tries to make contact himself. Expecting a big welcome party, Smith instead is approached by a group of androids and their robot leader who demands he surrender all weapons and offers a treasure if he complies. Driven by greed, Smith steals the Robinsons' weapons and hands them over, but the robot tricks him and forces him to work on a laborious assembly line. Guest stars: Dawson Palmer (Cyborg), Sue England (Space Control), Michael Fox (Summit)
| 33 | 4 | "Forbidden World" | Don Richardson | Barney Slater | October 5, 1966 |
After evading an alien missile, the Jupiter 2 suffers damage and the Robinsons are once again forced down on an unknown world. Dr. Smith sends the Robot out to investigate the mist-shrouded planet and when it does not return, the Professor forces Smith to go out and search for it with Will sneaking out to join him. After finding the Robot, Smith and Will encounter a hostile, reclusive hermit named Tiabo, who pretends to be part of an alien army in hopes of frightening the Robinsons away. Meanwhile, Smith becomes a human bomb when he consumes what he thinks is an exquisite drink, only to learn it was an explosive liquid. Guest stars: Wally Cox (Tiabo)
| 34 | 5 | "Space Circus" | Harry Harris | Bob & Wanda Duncan | October 12, 1966 |
Dr. Smith, Will and Penny encounter a charismatic entertainer named Dr. Marvello who operates an intergalactic circus. Although dismayed to learn that there are only the seven castaways to entertain, Marvello puts on a show anyway. Hoping the troupe will swing by Earth, Smith tries to join them with a song-and-dance routine, but the ringleader's interest is in young Will, who exhibits amazing powers of conjuration. Marvello then offers Smith the job of being Will's manager if he can coax the boy into joining the show. Guest stars: James Westerfield (Dr. Marvello), Melinda O. Fee (Fenestra), Harry Varteresian (Vicho), Michael Greene (Nubu), Dawson Palmer (Monster)
| 35 | 6 | "The Prisoners of Space" | Nathan Juran | Barney Slater | October 19, 1966 |
An alien from a galactic tribunal appears at the Robinsons' camp carrying a talking computer that announces the family and Don have been indicted for committing crimes in space – namely their previous trespassing aboard an alien ship and leaving junk in space when the Professor lost tools while repairing the Jupiter 2. The aliens hold the family behind an energy containment wall and then summon them one at a time to give their testimony of what really happened. The aliens soon realize Dr. Smith is the only guilty one who caused the problems and threaten to imprison him. The Robinsons, however, sign a petition to excuse Smith by reason of insanity. Guest stars: Dawson Palmer (Monster). Note: This episode is often mistaken for a clip show, but only about five minutes are taken filling up time by showing scenes from only two previous episodes.
| 36 | 7 | "The Android Machine" | Don Richardson | Bob & Wanda Duncan | October 26, 1966 |
Dr. Smith finds an alien vending machine and unintentionally orders a servant android named Verda. Smith, however, becomes annoyed with the android and passes her off to Will and Penny to befriend. Soon, a celestial department-store manager named Mr. Zumdish arrives and notifies Smith that the payment for Verda is past due, but Smith refuses to pay, claiming Verda is defective merchandise. Zumdish demands Verda back, but the Robinsons refuse to hand her over, believing she has developed human feelings and is no longer a piece of merchandise. Guest stars: Dawson Palmer (Monster), Dee Hartford (Verda), Fritz Feld (Mr. Zumdish), Tiger Joe Marsh (Elevator Operator)
| 37 | 8 | "The Deadly Games of Gamma 6" | Nathan Juran | Barney Slater | November 2, 1966 |
After Professor Robinson defeats a gladiatorial brute in hand-to-hand combat, he is approached by an intergalactic fight promoter who requests he enter his games. The Professor refuses, but after Dr. Smith learns a fighter could stand to earn riches beyond imagination if he wins, he tries to enter the games himself – but only after cutting a deal to face what he believes is the weakest opponent. Meanwhile, Major West and the Professor eavesdrop on the promoter and learn that if Smith should lose the match, he dooms Earth to an alien invasion. Guest stars: Mike Kellin (Myko), Harry Monty (Geoo), Peter Brocco (Alien Leader)
| 38 | 9 | "The Thief from Outer Space" | Sobey Martin | Jackson Gillis | November 9, 1966 |
Will and Dr. Smith are attacked by an Arabian thief and they run back to the safety of the Jupiter 2. No one, however, believes the story of their encounter, especially Penny – that is until Will, Smith, and she are whisked away in a spaceship sedan chair to a nearby asteroid, where the thief has set up his camp. Penny is put to work tending a furnace, while the thief recruits Will to help him find his lost love – a princess he believes is trapped somewhere back on the Robinsons' planet. Meanwhile, Smith is mistaken as the return of the cruel vizier who imprisoned the princess, and the thief vows revenge against him. Guest stars: Malachi Throne (Thief), Ted Cassidy (Slave)
| 39 | 10 | "Curse of Cousin Smith" | Justus Addiss | Barney Slater | November 16, 1966 |
Dr. Smith flees in terror when his estranged cousin, Colonel Jeremiah Smith, has tracked him down and pays him a visit. Although the Robinsons show Jeremiah hospitality, Dr. Smith adamantly refuses to see his relative. Everyone thinks Dr. Smith is being rude, until they learn that the cousin is trying to kill him because the last surviving member of the Smith family will get their late Aunt Maude's fortune. The Professor forces the two cousins to a truce, but Jeremiah cons Dr. Smith into gambling away the inheritance on a robotic slot machine. The scheme backfires, however, when the machine tries to kill one of them for the payment. Guest stars: Henry Jones (Jeremiah)
| 40 | 11 | "West of Mars" | Nathan Juran | Michael Fessier | November 30, 1966 |
Dr. Smith is accosted by an interstellar gunslinger named Zeno, who happens to be his mirror-double. Zeno forces Smith to swap clothes and has him arrested by a galactic lawman. While Zeno hides out among the Robinsons, Smith is taken to another planet to stand trial, and Will is brought along as a material witness. Once at the planet, Smith and Will manage to escape the lawman and find a town full of residents who fear the real Zeno, and Smith takes advantage of the mistaken identity. When another gunslinger arrives to challenge Zeno, however, Smith's cowardice blows his cover. Fleeing back to the Robinsons' planet, Smith returns with the lawman right behind him, but a problem arises when no one can tell Zeno and Dr. Smith apart. Guest stars: Allan Melvin (Space Enforcer Claudio), Ken Mayer (Pleiades Pete), Mickey Manners (Dee)
| 41 | 12 | "A Visit to Hades" | Don Richardson | Carey Wilber | December 7, 1966 |
When Will and Dr. Smith find a golden lyre, Smith strums it and is transported to a hellish place filled with fire and brimstone. There, a devilish man named Morbus presents a review of Smith's devious life and promises eternal damnation if he does not change his ways. Morbus lets the terrified Smith go, but only if he agrees to destroy the harp. Smith is happy to do so, but his attempt ends up releasing Morbus from his fiery dimension. Once free, Morbus meets Judy and quickly takes a liking to her, which annoys Major West. Meanwhile, Smith learns Morbus is not the Devil, but an alien, and the dimension is a prison to which the harp provides access. Smith tries to return Morbus back to the prison, but in doing so, he unwittingly sends Judy there, as well. West then threatens to rip Smith's head off if he does not figure out how to get Judy back. Guest star: Gerald Mohr (Morbus) 'Note: This is the only episode broadcast on CBS primetime on three occasions - twice during the second season, and the third time as the final episode of the third season. This episode was a cast and crew favorite. Mark Goddard was injured making this episode.
| 42 | 13 | "Wreck of the Robot" | Nathan Juran | Barney Slater | December 14, 1966 |
Dr. Smith, Will, and the Robot find a cave where they encounter shadowy beings who demand the Robot be given to them to examine. The three flee back to the Jupiter 2, where aliens project a message to Professor Robinson with an offer to buy the Robot, but he refuses to sell. When the aliens threaten to harm the family, the Robot voluntarily gives himself up for their experiment. The beings end up taking the Robot apart and then later dump his parts in a heap on the Robinsons' doorstep. John and Don, then Will, rebuild the Robot, but suddenly everything mechanical around the ship goes haywire. The Robot warns that the aliens are building a weapon that controls machinery and the Robinsons must stop the aliens' evil plans. Trivia: Years before the Borg from Star Trek: TNG coined the phrase "Resistance is futile," the Saticon told the Robot "Resistance would be futile."
| 43 | 14 | "The Dream Monster" | Don Richardson | Peter Packer | December 21, 1966 |
Penny encounters an android named Raddion and its creator, Sesmar, who is intrigued with her feelings for beauty and compassion, and wishes to instill such qualities upon his machine. Sesmar tests the Robinsons' feelings with a special camera he gives to Dr. Smith, and then tricks the family into entering his lab, where he drains the emotions from their minds and leaves them irritable and lazy people. Major West, whose traits were rejected by Sesmar, has to team up with his nemesis Dr. Smith to stop the mad scientist and return the Robinsons back to normal. Guest stars: John Abbott (Sesmar), Dawson Palmer (Android Raddion)
| 44 | 15 | "The Golden Man" | Don Richardson | Barney Slater | December 28, 1966 |
While the men are off exploring the planet, the women and Dr. Smith are approached by a handsome golden-skinned man named Keema, who offers them extravagant gifts and friendship. Keema explains he is at war with a belligerent and hostile, frog-headed alien that Penny and Dr. Smith had encountered earlier. Despite Keema's hospitality, Penny distrusts him and goes to talk to the frog-like alien. She finds the creature a more likable being who simply wishes to survive and fights only to preserve his people. Meanwhile, the golden man asks Smith for the Robinsons' weapons to break the balance of power, and in return he offers Smith a lift back to Earth. Smith foolishly gives the man the weapons, and the alien reveals its true form – a twisted-faced monster who really plans to destroy the Robinsons once he finishes off his enemy. Guest stars: Dennis Patrick (Keema), Ron Gans (Frog Alien), Bill Troy (Handsome Alien)
| 45 | 16 | "The Girl from the Green Dimension" | Nathan Juran | Peter Packer | January 4, 1967 |
The green space girl Athena – who hypnotized Dr. Smith while the Jupiter 2 traveled through space – returns when Smith finds her with a dimensional telescope. While Athena showers affection upon Smith, her former suitor Urso arrives and challenges Smith to a duel. To make sure Smith accepts the challenge, Urso curses innocent Will with green skin and hair. Meanwhile, the telescope begins to show glimpses of the future, and Smith becomes terrified when he sees what he believes is his own funeral. Guest stars: Vitina Marcus (Athena - Her name was changed from Lorelei when she appeared in "Wild Adventure"), Harry Raybould (Urso)
| 46 | 17 | "The Questing Beast" | Don Richardson | Carey Wilbur | January 11, 1967 |
Dr. Smith and Will encounter a bumbling knight named Sagramonte who is on a great quest to slay a beast called Gundemar. He has been chasing the beast for 40 years across many worlds. Will admires him for his bravery and tries to help him in his quest. Meanwhile, Smith tries to find the Knight's ship in hopes he can get back to Earth, until he learns the Knight travels via magic he does not understand. Later, Penny encounters Gundemar and finds the beast a kind and very intelligent being who she quickly befriends and tries to hide from the knight. Guest stars: Hans Conried (Sagramonte), June Foray, (voice of the Questing Beast).
| 47 | 18 | "The Toymaker" | Robert Douglas | Bob & Wanda Duncan | January 25, 1967 |
Will finds another alien vending machine, but this one appears broken. Again, Dr. Smith fiddles with the controls, but he disappears into the machine. Will tries to get him, but he too is teleported away. Will finds himself in a toymaker's shop where he meets Mr. O.M., who thinks Will and Smith are escaped toys and sends a wind-up monster after them. Outside the machine, the Professor and Major West try to get Will and Smith back before a nearby fissure in the crust opens further and imperils them all. A representative of the machine's owners, Mr. Zumdish of the Celestial Department Store, returns and declares the machine "outdated" and that it must be destroyed. Guest stars: Walter Burke (Mr. O.M.), Fritz Feld (Zumdish), Tiger Joe Marsh (Security Guard), Larry Dean (Wooden Soldier), Dawson Palmer (Monster)
| 48 | 19 | "Mutiny in Space" | Don Richardson | Peter Packer | February 1, 1967 |
Dr. Smith conducts a rain-making experiment, but his device malfunctions and destroys a vital piece of equipment. Fed-up with his mischief, Professor Robinson exiles him. While away, Smith finds a crashed spaceship and announces to the Robinsons that he will fix the craft and leave them behind. Don mocks Smith, with John's cooperation, leaving some spare parts and repair supplies from the Jupiter 2. Smith's plan backfires when he and Will encounter the ship's owner – a bombastic space Admiral named Zahrt (of the Imperial Cassiopeian Navy) who forces Will, Smith and the Robot to repair and crew his vessel. After installing the propulsion unit from the Robinsons, Zahrt blasts off to seek revenge against his former mutinous crew who stranded him on the planet. Guest star: Ronald Long (Admiral Zahrt)
| 49 | 20 | "The Space Vikings" | Ezra Stone | Margaret Brookman Hill | February 8, 1967 |
While reciting lines for a play, Dr. Smith summons a pair of magical gloves and the golden hammer of Thor. Smith then encounters Thor's wife Brynhilda, who takes him to Valhalla upon a pegasus. Soon, Will arrives with Thor who has been searching for the gloves and hammer, but Brynhilda claims the hammer has chosen Smith to replace Thor as the warrior deity. Infuriated, Thor challenges Smith to a duel to the death. Terrified that he will be killed, Smith tries to use psychology on Thor, who breaks down admitting that he feels washed-up and is unable to fight again. Now Will and Smith must give Thor his confidence back when a group of Titans arrive and threaten to destroy his kingdom. Guest stars: Sheila Allen (Brynhilda), Bern Hoffman (Thor)
| 50 | 21 | "Rocket to Earth" | Don Richardson | Barney Slater | February 15, 1967 |
Dr. Smith thinks he is going mad when he encounters a magician named Zalto who only he can see. The Robot, however, confirms the Magician's presence and leads Smith and Will to his secret lair. There, Smith learns Zalto has his own spaceship and the wizard plans to promote himself by using the craft to destroy an asteroid with the resulting explosion spelling his name among the stars. Smith volunteers to be Zalto's apprentice so he can swindle his way aboard the ship and take it back to Earth. When Smith boards the craft, Zalto pushes Will inside with him and launches the ship. As planned, Smith goes to Earth, but thinking they are hostile aliens, Earth defense launches missiles at them. Guest star: Al Lewis (Magician), Bob May (Dummy's Voice)
| 51 | 22 | "The Cave of the Wizards" | Don Richardson | Peter Packer | February 22, 1967 |
While the Robinsons prepare the Jupiter 2 for liftoff, Dr. Smith has an accident and suffers amnesia. He is then lured to a cave where he finds an ancient computer that manifests anything he desires. When Will fetches Smith for take off, he finds him mutated into a silver-skinned being named Oniak whose mind is being filled with alien knowledge. Later, the Professor and Major West try to convince Smith to return, but they find him completely taken over by the alien presence who refuses to leave the planet. With minutes before liftoff, the Robinsons give up hope of returning Smith, but Will sneaks away determined to bring him back.
| 52 | 23 | "Treasure of the Lost Planet" | Harry Harris | Carey Wilber | March 1, 1967 |
While Will and Penny learn the rules of roulette from Dr. Smith, Penny finds the entrance to a secret cave. Captain Tucker the space pirate returns in search of a mechanical head-in-a-box that thinks Dr. Smith is its former master – the late pirate "Billy Bones". Hot on the trail of Bones' treasure, Tucker lies in wait for the head to reveal the location to Smith. Tucker's impatient crew, however, wants the treasure now and forces Smith to lead them to it, but the head doesn't cooperate and puts Smith's life in danger. Meanwhile, Will, who admired Tucker, becomes disappointed when he learns he has taken up with bad company again when he promised to lead an honest living the last time they met. Guest stars: Albert Salmi (Alonzo P. Tucker), Jim Boles (Smeek)
| 53 | 24 | "Revolt of the Androids" | Don Richardson | Bob & Wanda Duncan | March 8, 1967 |
While Dr. Smith, Will and the Robot search for rubies, they encounter a super-android who identifies himself as IDAK (Instant Destroyer and Killer) and walks around shouting "Crush! Kill! Destroy!". Thinking the machine could be useful to him, Smith tries to draw up a service contract. Meanwhile, the gynoid Verda returns to the Robinsons after escaping a disassembly order, and she warns them of the android that was sent to destroy her. When IDAK detects Verda's presence, he goes after her, but the family is determined to save Verda by playing off the destroyer's human emotions. Unbeknownst to everyone, a second IDAK – one stronger and unsusceptible to human feelings – is sent to replace the flawed IDAK. Guest stars: Dee Hartford (Verda), Don Matheson (IDAK Alpha 12), Dawson Palmer (IDAK Omega 17)
| 54 | 25 | "The Colonists" | Ezra Stone | Peter Packer | March 15, 1967 |
While the Robinsons set up an array of radio dishes, a harsh feedback noise sounds though the system and fries all communications. A woman's voice, that orders them to surrender, is the only thing they can hear. The Robinson children and the Robot are then taken prisoner by alien guards while the adults are approached by a warrior woman named Niolani who has the men taken as slaves. Niolani has the men build her a transport arch so that her people can come to the world and colonize it as part of her female-dominated empire. Meanwhile, Will and the Robot come up with a plan to sabotage the arch so everyone can escape. Guest stars: Francine York (Niolani)
| 55 | 26 | "Trip Through the Robot" | Don Richardson | Barney Slater | March 22, 1967 |
Dr. Smith's carelessness causes a vital power unit to overload and the Professor orders a power ration until the system can be repaired; this means not recharging the Robot who is critically low on power. The depressed Robot uses his remaining power to go off and die alone, but Will refuses to let him go and he and Smith track him down into a dangerous area of unstable atmosphere. There, the two are shocked when they find the bizarre gases of the area have caused the Robot to grow to the size of a house. Will and Smith then venture inside the massive robot in hopes of stabilizing his power systems and returning him to a normal size.
| 56 | 27 | "The Phantom Family" | Ezra Stone | Peter Packer | March 29, 1967 |
While John and Maureen are off exploring, the Jupiter 2 camp comes under attack by an alien force. Will tries to get a message through to his parents at a relay station, but when he returns to the ship, he finds Dr. Smith, Major West, Penny and Judy acting strangely and the Robot damaged. Will then finds a cave and encounters an alien named Lemnoc who has created android duplicates of the family while the real members have been put into stasis. Will demands their release, but Lemnoc wants him to teach his androids to act as humans. Will agrees to help, but Lemnoc has a devious plan for his androids to steal the Jupiter 2. Guest star: Alan Hewitt (Lemnoc)
| 57 | 28 | "The Mechanical Men" | Seymour Robbie | Barney Slater | April 5, 1967 |
Dr. Smith causes another accident, and once again the Professor banishes him from the camp. While spending the night in the wilderness, Smith is accosted by dozens of tiny robots who hold him prisoner. The mechanical men then approach the Robinsons and demand their Robot come to them to be their great leader. The Robot complies, but the sinister mechanical men find him too kind and tolerant for their needs. Preferring Smith's treachery and ruthlessness, they transfer Smith's personality to the Robot's body and vice versa. Now Smith-minded Robot commands an unstoppable mechanical army on a mission to seize the Jupiter 2 from the Robinsons, while the Robot-minded Dr. Smith feels he is obligated to stop them himself.
| 58 | 29 | "The Astral Traveler" | Don Richardson | Carey Wilber | April 12, 1967 |
Seeking shelter from a storm, Will and Dr. Smith enter a cave, but the opening collapses and traps them inside. Searching for a way out, Will finds a revolving door which leads to a Scottish castle back on Earth. There, Will is chased by a terrifying monster and later encounters a mischievous ghost named Hamish who follows Will back to the Robinsons' planet where he appears in the flesh. The Robinsons reopen the portal for him and Dr. Smith volunteers to go through as well to contact Alpha Control, but his stay on Earth is short once Hamish learns an ancestor of Smith was responsible for his ghostly curse and he tries to exact revenge upon him. Guest stars: Sean McClory (Hamish) Note: Guy Williams does not appear in this episode, as only his voice is heard.
| 59 | 30 | "The Galaxy Gift" | Ezra Stone | Barney Slater | April 26, 1967 |
While Dr. Smith, Penny and Will conduct a play, a sickly alien named Arcon appears and begs for help. Penny takes him back to the Jupiter 2 to rest, but soon a trio of aliens called the Saticons appear and demand Arcon surrender to them. Penny refuses to betray her new friend and the Saticons turn down the heat in an attempt to freeze the Robinsons to death. Arcon decides to leave, but he gives Penny his magic belt for safekeeping. Smith then goes to the Saticons to inform them that Arcon has left, but the aliens know Penny has the belt and offer Smith the use of their molecular transporter to beam himself back to Earth if he gets it for them. Smith schemes to hand off a forgery of the belt instead, but unbeknownst to him, the aliens really plan to transport him to a duplicate of San Francisco's Chinatown on a lifeless asteroid. Guest stars: John Carradine (Arcon), Jim Mills (Saticon #1) Note: The cliffhanger ending to this episode was an edited version of the cold start to "Blast Off into Space" as the series now went into summer reruns.

=== Season 3 (1967–68) ===
| No. overall | No. in season | Title | Directed by | Written by | Original release date |
|---|---|---|---|---|---|
| 60 | 1 | "Condemned of Space" | Nathan Juran | Peter Packer | September 6, 1967 |
A comet threatens to impact the Robinson's planet and the family is forced to make a hasty escape in the Jupiter 2. Once in flight, Dr. Smith fools with the airlock controls and accidentally sends the Robot into space. Next, the Jupiter 2 docks with an alien spaceship, the Professor and Major West venture inside and reunite with the Robot. They soon realize the ship is an automated prison filled with alien felons that are cryogenically preserved. Once again, Smith tampers with controls he doesn't understand and releases a dangerous prisoner who tries to free the other inmates and take over the ship. Guest stars: Marcel Hillaire (Phanzig) Note: This was the first episode featuring a live action opening credit sequence accompanied with new theme music and to conclude with a teaser of highlights from the next week's episode rather than the previous two seasons cliffhanger freeze style conclusion.
| 61 | 2 | "Visit to a Hostile Planet" | Sobey Martin | Peter Packer | September 13, 1967 |
The Jupiter 2 is caught in a space warp and accelerates on a wild ride. Once it's over, the Robinsons are shocked to see planet Earth lingering before them. There is no contact with Alpha Control, but the Professor decides to land anyway and sets the ship down in a small Michigan town which they find strangely deserted. The professor and Don scout around and find an antiquated automobile; turning on the car radio, the Professor learns they have time warped to the year 1947 and the townsfolk think they have been invaded by aliens. Meanwhile, Dr. Smith believes he can make a fortune advancing the technology of the backward era and, disguised as a fire chief, he tries to lead a vigilante force to take the Robinsons prisoner. Guest stars: Robert Foulk (Joe Cragmire), Pitt Herbert (Grover), Claire Wilcox (Stacy), Norman Leavitt (Charlie), Robert Pine (Craig)
| 62 | 3 | "Kidnapped in Space" | Don Richardson | Robert Hamner | September 20, 1967 |
Dr. Smith intercepts a distress call from an alien ship that asks for medical assistance and promising a "great reward" to whoever helps. Smith and the Robot take the space pod and board the alien craft where they find a crew of androids who take Smith to their sick leader – a malfunctioning computerized brain. Smith realizes he is in over his head and tries to leave, but the androids threaten to kill him if he backs out. The Robot comes to the rescue stating he can fix the computer, but he refuses once he learns the brain is evil and wants to take over the universe. Meanwhile, the androids capture the Jupiter 2 and threaten to kill the Robinsons if the Robot doesn't conduct the repairs. Guest stars: Grant Sullivan (Alien #764), Carol Williams (Alien #1220)
| 63 | 4 | "Hunter's Moon" | Don Richardson | Jack Turley | September 27, 1967 |
Professor Robinson and the Robot head out in the space pod to investigate a nearby planet. After landing, the Professor kills a hostile creature and he is quickly approached by a furious alien named Megazor who claims he has cost him points in an intergalactic hunt by killing the beast. The alien hunter then decides the Professor will make a more valuable target and has him prepare himself to survive as the target for the next hunt. Back on the Jupiter 2, Dr. Smith refuses to risk a rescue of the Professor and tries to force the ship back to Earth. He instead fiddles with the controls and causes a crash-landing. Once again, the Robinson family is stranded on an alien world. Guest star: Vincent Beck (Megazor)
| 64 | 5 | "The Space Primevals" | Nathan Juran | Peter Packer | October 4, 1967 |
While the Jupiter 2 is threatened by lava flows from an erupting volcano, Major West and a reluctant Dr. Smith are on a mission in the Chariot to cap the mountain with a nuclear explosive. Arriving at the site, the two are accosted by a tribe of cavemen who worship an ancient computer, Protinius, that gives the chief strange powers. Major West tries to warn them of the danger the volcano poses, but the chief has him and Smith sealed up inside a cave. As the oxygen runs out, Smith and West try to reconcile their differences as the end draws near. Meanwhile, the Professor, Will and the Robot mount a rescue, with the Robot challenging the computer as the mechanical leader of the tribe. Guest star: Arthur Batanides (Rangah)
| 65 | 6 | "Space Destructors" | Don Richardson | Robert Hamner | October 11, 1967 |
After Dr. Smith, Will and the Robot find a cave full of strange machinery, Smith fiddles with the controls and creates a faceless android that chases him back to the ship. The Professor destroys the android and has Smith confined to his quarters. Later Smith sneaks back to the cave to make more androids. This time, however, they are not only programmed to serve Smith, they look just like him. When Will learns of Smith's personal army, he tries to stop him, but Will becomes trapped in the android machine and emerges as a Smith-faced android programmed with the twisted desire to control the universe. Guest star: Tommy Farrell (Cyborg) Note: This episode was nominated in 1968 for an Emmy award for Outstanding Individual Achievement in the Visual Arts, Dan Striepeke.
| 66 | 7 | "The Haunted Lighthouse" | Sobey Martin | Jackson Gillis | October 18, 1967 |
Moments before takeoff, Penny encounters an elfin boy named J-5 who claims to be the last survivor of a doomed colony, and the Robinsons take him with them when they leave. Soon the Jupiter 2 comes upon a remote Earth space station commanded by an eccentric old man, Colonel Silas Fogey, who offers the Robinsons enough fuel to get back to Earth. Unfortunately, he doesn't have enough for them to swing by J-5's world as well. Upset that he won't be going home, J-5 unleashes his imaginary friend Zaybo upon the station and tries to steal the Jupiter 2. Guest stars: Lou Wagner (J-5), Woodrow Parfrey (Col. Silas Fogey), Kenya Coburn (Zaybo)
| 67 | 8 | "Flight into the Future" | Sobey Martin | Peter Packer | October 25, 1967 |
Dr. Smith, Will and the Robot are accidentally launched away in the space pod and land on a nearby planet. The family chases after them but crash-land nearby in a barren desert. Meanwhile, the pod crew find themselves in a tropical rainforest even though they are only a half-mile from the ship. Feeling sleepy, Smith and Will take a nap, but wake up over 270 years in the future where Will meets a distant relative that looks like Judy. Likewise, Smith meets a great-great-great-great-grandson who blames him for tarnishing the Smith family name. Guest stars: Lew Gallo (Commander Fletcher), Don Eitner (Sergeant Smith)
| 68 | 9 | "Collision of Planets" | Don Richardson | Peter Packer | November 8, 1967 |
A group of spaced-out hippies arrive on the Robinson's planet and begin setting up planetary explosives. They claim the planet is on a collision course with their world and they have been tasked to destroy it, leaving the Robinsons little choice but to rush repairs and get the Jupiter 2 back into space. In the meantime, Dr. Smith is exposed to a strange gas and passes out. He later awakens with curly green hair and superhuman strength. Guest stars: Daniel J. Travanti (Ilan), Linda Gaye Scott (Alien Girl)
| 69 | 10 | "Space Creature" | Sobey Martin | William Welch | November 15, 1967 |
The Jupiter 2 is caught in the orbit of a fog-shrouded planet where a gaseous entity creeps aboard. When it learns Will "just wants to be alone", people begin to disappear, starting with Maureen, Judy, Penny, Major West then Dr. Smith. Eventually the Professor and the Robot vanish and Will finds himself completely alone and terrified. Meanwhile, the others find themselves in a foggy realm and tormented by an evil entity who feeds off their fear.
| 70 | 11 | "Deadliest of the Species" | Don Richardson | Robert Hamner | November 22, 1967 |
The Robinsons land on a planet and are followed down by a space capsule that crashes nearby. Soon, two androids arrive with orders to take the capsule, but they believe the Robinsons are hiding it and attack them. Meanwhile, the Robot locates the capsule and encounters a gynoid. Although she is evil, the Robot begins to fall in love and is easily manipulated to serve her. When she demands a device the Robinsons cannot live without, the Robot's loyalties are tested. Guest stars: Ron Gans (Alien Leader), Lyle Waggoner (Mechanical Man I), Ralph Lee (Mechanical Man II)
| 71 | 12 | "A Day at the Zoo" | Irving J. Moore | Jackson Gillis | November 29, 1967 |
Penny encounters a caveboy named Oggo who tries to warn her of an evil zookeeper named Farnum, but she is captured in Farnum's trap and he adds her to his collection of human exhibits. Farnum then captures Major West and Judy, then Dr. Smith, Will and the Robot. When Will and Oggo try to escape, Will and Farnum are knocked through a portal and become trapped on a hostile planet. With Farnum out of the way, Dr. Smith tries to take over the show once he learns how lucrative a space zoo can be. Guest stars: Leonard Stone (Farnum), Gary Tigerman (Oggo), Ronald Weber (Mort) Note: Guy Williams does not appear in this episode.
| 72 | 13 | "Two Weeks in Space" | Don Richardson | Robert Hamner | December 13, 1967 |
A group of alien bank robbers, disguised as humans, brainwash the Celestial Department Store manager Mr. Zumdish into thinking he is a galactic tour guide. With the thieves looking for a place to lie low, Zumdish contacts Dr. Smith who learns the "vacationers" are willing to spend much money for some R & R. With the rest of the Robinsons off on a survey mission, Smith turns the empty Jupiter 2 into a 5-star resort with Will as the bellboy and the Robot laboriously filling every other position a hotel needs. Guest stars: Fritz Feld (Zumdish), Richard Krisher (MXR), Eric Matthews (QZW), Edy Williams (NON), Carroll Roebke (TAT)
| 73 | 14 | "Castles in Space" | Sobey Martin | Peter Packer | December 20, 1967 |
Major West, Judy, Will, Dr. Smith and the Robot are on a mission to install a radar station when Smith stumbles upon a being frozen in a block of ice. While standing guard, Smith carelessly places a thermal blanket over the ice and it melts releasing an alien princess. Soon, a silver-skinned bounty hunter-turned desperado named Chavo arrives and holds Will captive under the guard of fake soldiers. Chavo then demands West surrender the ice woman or he will harm the boy. West challenges Chavo to a duel to save her instead. Guest stars: Alberto Monte (Chavo), Corinna Tsopei (Princess Reyka)
| 74 | 15 | "The Anti-Matter Man" | Sutton Roley | K.C. Alison | December 27, 1967 |
While conducting a power experiment, Professor Robinson brings forth an evil double of himself from a parallel universe. The double takes him back to an anti-matter world where a sinister clone of Major West also exists. Trying to find the Professor, Will and the Robot recreate the experiment and venture to the alternate dimension, but they bring back the anti-matter duplicate instead (thinking it's the real Professor). Everyone suspects something is wrong as the Professor acts cruel, demanding, paranoid and casts no shadow (they are, however, completely unaware that he keeps hidden a skin tag "collar" that physically distinguishes him from the real Professor). Will then sneaks away to find his real dad, followed by the anti-Professor and later Smith and the Robot. After escaping his cage, the real Professor meets up and fights his anti-self, winning and bringing the universe to its normal state.
| 75 | 16 | "Target Earth" | Nathan Juran | Peter Packer | January 3, 1968 |
While in space, Dr. Smith separates the Robot's upper body from his track section which wheels itself into the space pod and takes off. The Robinsons chase the pod to a nearby planet where it lands amidst an alien city. There, the crew encounter a race of bloblike creatures that all look the same. Wanting to experience human individuality, the aliens take the form of the crew and hijack the Jupiter 2 on a course for Earth. Will and Smith, having sneaked aboard, try to sabotage the ship and warn Earth that their ship has been taken over by hostile aliens. Guest stars: Jim Gosa (Gilt Proto)
| 76 | 17 | "Princess of Space" | Don Richardson | Jackson Gillis | January 10, 1968 |
On a search to find a missing Princess, a space captain named Kraspo believes Penny is the girl he is looking for. Will tries to convince the captain that he's made a mistake, but Penny passes all his tests to verify her identity including feeling a pea hidden under a mattress. Once Dr. Smith learns he could live like royalty serving Penny in her kingdom, he tries to convince the bewildered girl to accept the situation. Meanwhile, Will overhears Kraspo's robotic crew plotting a mutiny to take over during Penny's coronation ceremony. Guest stars: Robert Foulk (Kraspo), Arte Johnson (Fedor), Sheila Allen (Aunt Gamma) Note: Angela Cartwright's real-life sister Veronica Cartwright plays Princess Alpha.
| 77 | 18 | "Time Merchant" | Ezra Stone | Bob & Wanda Duncan | January 17, 1968 |
While conducting an experiment to capture cosmic energy, Will inadvertently traps Chronos, an alien who controls time. Furious at Will for interfering with his business, Chronos forces the boy to return with him to his factory. When Professor Robinson learns what happened, he and the Robot pursue the alien, followed by Dr. Smith. When Smith learns Chronos' machine can transport him through space as well as time, he "steals" a ride back to Earth in 1997, hours before the launch of the Jupiter 2. Chronos warns Robinson that unless Dr. Smith is on board the Jupiter 2 at liftoff, the ship will eventually be destroyed by an uncharted asteroid and the Robinsons and Major West will all be killed. Guest star: John Crawford (Dr. Chronos), Byron Morrow (General Squires), Hoke Howell (Sgt. Rogers) Note: Regulars June Lockhart and Mark Goddard appear only in a "flashback" sequence filmed specifically for this episode. Marta Kristen and Angela Cartwright appear only in reused footage from the pilot episode.
| 78 | 19 | "The Promised Planet" | Ezra Stone | Peter Packer | January 24, 1968 |
The Robinsons finally arrive at their destination, the Alpha Centauri system, but they are surprised to find an Earth colony already established there. Another oddity is that it only seems to be populated by teenagers who try to brainwash Penny and Will into rebelling against the "olders". When Dr. Smith snoops around, he discovers the teens are really aliens in human guise, but they give Smith his youth back and make him forget what he saw. The aliens, who never grow older-minded than adolescents, try to discover what makes the human children mature. Guest stars: Gil Rogers (Bartholomew), Keith Taylor (Edgar), Ezra Stone (Computer Voice)
| 79 | 20 | "Fugitives in Space" | Ezra Stone | Robert Hamner | January 31, 1968 |
Major West and Dr. Smith encounter Creech, an alien fugitive who forcibly swaps his prison shirt for Smith's jacket and flees the scene just as prison guards arrive. West and Smith then find themselves accused of aiding the criminal and stand trial before a computerized judge. Will and the Robot act as their legal counsel, but the two are found guilty as charged and sent to the notorious prison planet Destructon to serve life sentences, along with Creech who is captured by the Robot just as the trial is ending. There Smith is convinced by Creech of his escape plan, but West refuses and is knocked unconscious and carried away by Creech. Will and the Robot learn that Smith and West were framed so the warden can find where Creech was planning to escape, leading him to hidden billions in Deutronium. Creech gets killed entering the Devil's Quadrant and the warden gives Smith and West their pardon. Guest stars: Michael Conrad (Creech), Tol Avery (Warden), Charles Horvath (Guard #1) Notes: Regulars Guy Williams, June Lockhart, Marta Kristen and Angela Cartwright do not appear in this episode (see "The Great Vegetable Rebellion"). Mark Goddard, Jonathan Harris, and Bill Mumy are the only main cast members to appear in this episode. This episode was in production at the same time as Planet of the Apes, and John Chambers' make-up was tested during this episode. Jonathan Harris was offered a part in POTA, but declined because he found the 4-hour make-up process to be daunting.
| 80 | 21 | "Space Beauty" | Irving J. Moore | Jackson Gillis | February 14, 1968 |
The space traveling showman Farnum B. returns seeking contestants for a Miss Galaxy pageant and sets his sights on Judy when his mysterious sponsor demands she enter. Judy turns down the offer, but Dr. Smith, knowing he could profit greatly for signing her up, coerces her into signing a contract. When Major West reads the fine-print he learns the winner of the contest must be given over to the sinister being who is made of fire and comes from a dark world without beauty. Guest stars: Leonard Stone (Farnum), Dee Hartford (Nancy Pi Squared), Miriam Schillar (Miss Teutonium) Note: Regulars Guy Williams and June Lockhart do not appear in this episode (see "The Great Vegetable Rebellion").
| 81 | 22 | "The Flaming Planet" | Don Richardson | Barney Slater | February 21, 1968 |
The Jupiter 2 passes through a radiation storm and Dr. Smith's alien plant mutates, growing into an intelligent monster. He dumps it out the airlock, but it attaches to the hull and endangers the ship. The Professor takes the ship into a planet's atmosphere to burn it off the hull, but the inhabitant of the world attacks and drains the ship's energy. Stuck in orbit, Major West forces Smith to go with him down to the planet to talk to the attacker – an alien called the Sobram. The being offers to spare the Jupiter 2 only if the Robot stays behind and plays a wargame with him. Unbeknown to all, the plantlike creature has made it to the surface and begins to multiply into an army of its own – and becomes a far better challenge for the Sobram. Guest stars: Abraham Sofaer (Sobram)
| 82 | 23 | "The Great Vegetable Rebellion" | Don Richardson | Peter Packer | February 28, 1968 |
While Don and the Robinsons celebrate the Robot's birthday, Dr. Smith sneaks off in the space pod to a planet dominated by intelligent flora. After picking a flower, Smith is accused of murder by Tybo, the carrot-man who rules this world. Tybo sentences Smith to an eternity of literal tree-hugging. The J2 crew lands to search for Smith, but instead they find Willoughby: a purple-haired botanist who is Tybo's aide-de-camp. With Dr. Smith mutating into a stalk of celery, and Penny into a flower bed, it's up to Will and Judy to find them all, and the Professor and Don to save the day by sabotaging the planet's weather-control system. Guest stars: Stanley Adams (Tybo), James Millhollin (Willoughby the Llama), Jerry Traylor (Plant) Notes: In 1997 TV Guide ranked this episode number 76 on its '100 Greatest Episodes of All Time' list.; Guy Williams and June Lockhart ruined so many takes of this episode by "corpsing" (in other words, they were unable to keep straight faces while filming) that both were suspended without pay for two episodes' worth of work; their characters were written entirely out of "Fugitives in Space" and "Space Beauty."; This episode is a rare occasion where Judy (rather than Penny, the Robot, or Dr. Smith) serves as Will's companion and assistant as he works to rescue the others.
| 83 | 24 | "Junkyard in Space" | Ezra Stone | Barney Slater | March 6, 1968 |
A fire breaks out aboard the Jupiter 2 and the Robinsons must land on a nearby planet to make repairs. They momentarily lose contact with the Robot, who has taken the space pod to scout ahead. Upon landing, the family discovers the entire planet is a massive junkyard run by a strange metallic junkman who has no intention of letting the Robinsons leave. When the ship's food supply becomes contaminated by a "rust blight," Dr. Smith bargains with the junkman for food, offering parts from the Robot to replace the junkman's own degrading circuits. The junkman eventually sets his sights on Jupiter 2, and after upgrading himself with the Robot's parts, he steals the ship with Dr. Smith aboard and leaves the Robinsons behind. Will follows in the space pod hoping the Robot's memory banks, now part of the junkman, can influence a change of heart. Guest star: Marcel Hillaire (Junkman) Notes: While this episode was in production, the cast and crew were informally led to believe that the series had been renewed for a fourth season. At least one script (the planned fourth season premiere "Malice in Wonderspace") was written; some accounts claim as many as five scripts were prepared. However, less than two months later, in May 1968, CBS announced they had cancelled the series and no fourth season was produced.; The end of episode teaser trailer was for "Condemned of Space" as the series now went into summer reruns.

== DVD and Blu-ray Releases ==
Complete box sets of all 3 seasons (and the original pilot film) of the original TV series have been released on DVD in South America, North America, Europe, and Australia.

The following DVD sets have been released by 20th Century Fox.

| DVD set | Episodes | Release date |
|---|---|---|
| Lost in Space: Season 1 | 30 | January 13, 2004 |
| Lost in Space: Season 2, Volume 1 | 16 | September 14, 2004 |
| Lost in Space: Season 2, Volume 2 | 14 | November 30, 2004 |
| Lost in Space: Season 3, Volume 1 | 15 | March 1, 2005 |
| Lost in Space: Season 3, Volume 2 | 9 | July 19, 2005 |

All episodes of Lost in Space were remastered and released on a Blu-ray disc set on September 15, 2015 (the 50th anniversary of the premiere on the CBS TV Network).

On February 5, 2019, all episodes (cropped to 16:9 widescreen from the Blu-ray masters) were re-released on a DVD disc set.
