= A Girl in Every Port =

A Girl in Every Port may refer to:

- A Girl in Every Port (1928 film), starring Victor McLaglen, Robert Armstrong, and Louise Brooks
- A Girl in Every Port (1952 film), featuring Groucho Marx, Marie Wilson, and William Bendix
