= Take One False Step =

1949 film by Chester Erskine

- Theatrical release poster
- Directed by: Chester Erskine
- Screenplay by: Chester Erskine; Irwin Shaw
- Based on: "Night Call" by David Shaw; Irwin Shaw
- Produced by: Chester Erskine
- Starring: William Powell; Shelley Winters
- Cinematography: Franz Planer
- Edited by: Russell F. Schoengarth
- Music by: Walter Scharf
- Color process: Black and white
- Production company: Universal Pictures
- Distributed by: Universal Pictures
- Release date: August 14, 1949
- Running time: 94 minutes
- Country: United States
- Language: English
- Budget: $855,000

Take One False Step is a 1949 American film noir crime film directed by Chester Erskine and starring William Powell, Shelley Winters and Marsha Hunt. It was produced and distributed by Universal Pictures.

== Plot ==
Married college professor Andrew Gentling reluctantly agrees to have a drink with Catherine Sykes, a wartime girlfriend. He is careful to avoid scandal as a founding professor of a new university. However, the next day Catherine is reported missing and is feared to have been murdered after a bloody scarf was found at her ransacked home. Catherine's friend Martha Wier, whom Andrew had also known previously, informs him that Catherine had been romantically involved with Freddie Blair, a crime partner of Catherine's husband. Andrew tries to retrieve Catherine's diary containing evidence of the affair from her bedroom, but he is attacked by a dog and suffers a deep cut on his hand.

Andrew flees but soon hears a news report that the dog who had attacked him was found to be rabid. As doctors in the area have been advised to immediately report all dog bites, Andrew is unable to receive medical treatment and believes that he is dying. Later, he watches in hiding as Freddie is killed by a passing train.

Andrew discovers that Catherine is alive and well and that no crime had occurred. No longer eluding capture, he is told that the dog that had attacked him was not actually rabid; the police had concocted the ruse to force the suspect to reveal himself.

== Cast ==
- William Powell as Professor Andrew Gentling
- Shelley Winters as Catherine Sykes
- Marsha Hunt as Martha Wier
- Dorothy Hart as Helen Gentling
- James Gleason as Captain Gledhill
- Felix Bressart as Professor Morris Avrum
- Art Baker as Dr. Henry Pritchard
- Sheldon Leonard as Detective Pacciano
- Howard Freeman as Dr. Markheim
- Houseley Stevenson as Dr. Montgomery Thatcher
- Paul Harvey as A.K. Arnspiger
- Francis Pierlot as Prof. Herbert Watson
- Jess Barker as Arnold Sykes
- Mikel Conrad as Freddie Blair

== Reception ==
New York Times film critic Bosley Crowther called Take One False Step a "curiously mixed-up mystery picture" and wrote: "Something of the same drollery that was displayed by William Powell in his saturnine performance of Nick Charles in the Thin Man films is flashed by him on a few occasions ... But for the most part our erstwhile detective and comedian is forced to play a role of rather painful proportions with forbidding austerity ... Powell is propelled into troubles that are neither funny nor flattering to him. Nor, for that matter, are they gripping as action drama to any great degree."
