= Never Love a Stranger =

- Film poster
- Directed by: Robert Stevens
- Written by: Richard Day; Harold Robbins
- Produced by: Richard Day; Peter Gettinger; Harold Robbins
- Starring: John Drew Barrymore; Steve McQueen; Robert Bray
- Cinematography: Lee Garmes
- Edited by: Sidney M. Katz
- Music by: Raymond Scott
- Distributed by: Allied Artists Pictures
- Release date: June 22, 1958
- Running time: 91 minutes
- Country: United States
- Language: English
- Budget: $750,000

Never Love a Stranger is a 1958 crime and gangster film based on Harold Robbins' 1948 debut novel of the same name, starring John Drew Barrymore and Robert Bray, and featuring Steve McQueen in an early role.

== Plot ==
Frankie Kane is brought up in a Catholic orphanage. He befriends a Jewish law student named Martin Cabell and becomes romantically involved with Cabell's maid, Julie. Kane later learns that he is also Jewish, and when told he will be removed from the orphanage and moved to a Jewish home, he runs away and turns to a life of crime. Later, after joining a major crime syndicate, he reconnects with Julie, finally deciding to join Martin, now a district attorney, in shutting down the syndicate.

== Main cast ==
- John Drew Barrymore as Frankie Kane
- Lita Milan as Julie, maid to the Cabell Family
- Steve McQueen as Martin Cabell
- Robert Bray as "Silk" Fennelli
- Salem Ludwig as Moishe Moscowitz
- R. G. Armstrong as Flix
- Douglas Rodgers as Brother Bernard
- Felice Orlandi as Bert
- Augusta Merighi as Mrs. Cozzolina
- Abe Simon as "Fats" Crown
- Vitina Marcus as Frances Kane

== Original novel ==
Robbins' novel was published in 1948. It became a best seller.

The book was one of several books banned in Philadelphia as indecent in 1948. The ban was overturned the following year.

== Production ==
In August 1957, it was announced that Barrymore would star and Robbins would write and produce. The Los Angeles Times called the part "the usual Barrymore role". At the time, Barrymore was under a year's suspension from Actors Equity, but this seemed to apply only to stage work.

The film was made through Caryn Productions, Robbins' own production company. Richard Day became co-producer and Allied Artists agreed to distribute the release. Filming started at Gold Medal Studios in the Bronx on September 9, 1957.

Robert Stevens agreed to direct and Steve McQueen was given an early role.
