= Dee Hartford =

American actress (1928–2018)

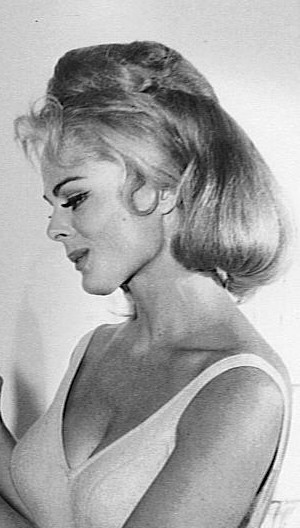
- Hartford as Miss Iceland in the Batman television series in 1966
- Born: Donna Beatrice Higgins; April 21, 1928; Salt Lake City, Utah, U.S.
- Died: October 21, 2018 (aged 90); Palm Desert, California, U.S.
- Education: East High School
- Occupation: Actress
- Years active: 1952–1976
- Known for: A Girl in Every Port; Perry Mason; The Twilight Zone; Batman; Lost in Space; Time Tunnel
- Spouses: Howard Hawks (m. 1953; div. 1959) Stuart Cramer III (m. 1972)
- Relatives: Eden Hartford (sister)

Dee Hartford (born Donna Beatrice Higgins; April 21, 1928 – October 21, 2018) was an American television actress. She was married to Howard Hawks from 1953 to 1959. Her younger sister was actress Eden Hartford; her former brother-in-law was comedian Groucho Marx.

== Early years ==
Hartford was born in Salt Lake City, Utah, the middle daughter of three daughters born to Edgar and Beatrice (née Thomas) Higgins. She attended East High School in Salt Lake City and LDS Business College, and then became a model.

== Career ==
In the late 1940s, Hartford was a model for Vogue. Her screen debut was in A Girl in Every Port (1952), directed by Chester Erskine. In 1964-65, she made three guest appearances on Perry Mason; as Leslie Ross in "The Case of the Accosted Accountant," as Lois Gray in "The Case of the Missing Button", and she played Rhonda Coleridge in "The Case of the Baffling Bug". In 1964, she appeared as the viraginous wife and mother in "The Bewitchin' Pool" (the last original episode of The Twilight Zone to be broadcast, but not the last one to be filmed).

Hartford guest starred in episodes of Gunsmoke, Burke's Law, The Outer Limits, The Alfred Hitchcock Hour, The Cara Williams Show, Batman (two episodes), Time Tunnel, Land of the Giants, and Lost in Space (three episodes). She appeared as the android Verda in the 1966 Lost in Space episode "The Android Machine" and in a sequel, "Revolt of the Androids". She also appeared in a third season episode of Lost in Space as Nancy Pi Squared in the “Space Beauty” episode about an intergalactic beauty pageant.

== Personal life ==
Hartford married Howard Hawks on February 20, 1953, at his home in Hollywood, California. They divorced in 1959. In 1972, she married Stuart Cramer III.

She was a member of the Church of Jesus Christ of Latter-day Saints.

== Selected filmography ==
- The Alfred Hitchcock Hour (1962) (Season 1, Episode 10: "Day of Reckoning") as Felicity Sampson
- Gunsmoke (1963) (Season 8, Episode 10:E23 "Ash") as Tillie (a saloon girl).
- The Outer Limits (1964) (Season 1, Episode 19: "The Invisibles") as Mrs. Clarke
