= Eden Hartford =

American actress (1930–1983)

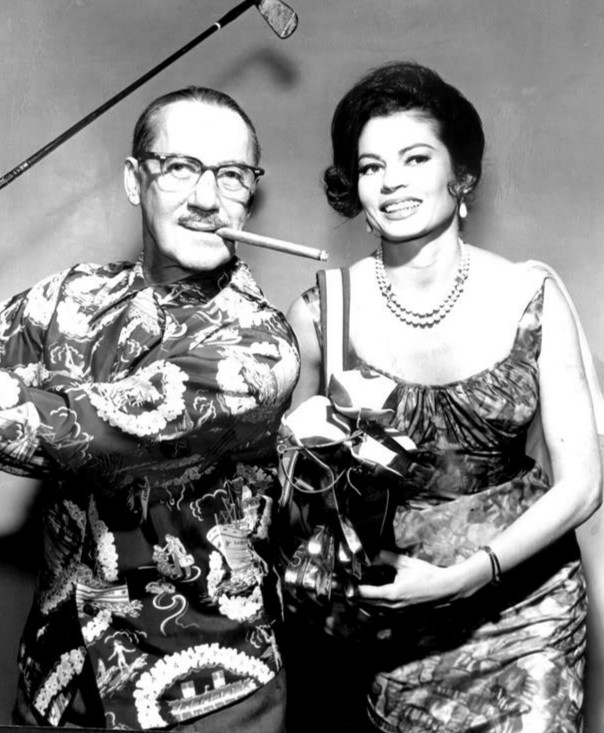
- Groucho Marx and Eden Hartford
- Born: Edna Marie Higgins; April 10, 1930; Salt Lake City, Utah, U.S.
- Died: December 15, 1983 (aged 53); Los Angeles, California, U.S.
- Resting place: Westwood Memorial Cemetery
- Other name: Eden Marx
- Years active: 1957–83
- Spouse: Groucho Marx (m. 1954; div. 1969)
- Relatives: Dee Hartford (sister)

Eden Hartford (born Edna Marie Higgins; April 10, 1930 – December 15, 1983) was an American film actress from 1957 to 1962. She was the third and last wife of comedian Groucho Marx from 1954 until their divorce in 1969.

She was born to Edgar Higgins and Beatrice Higgins (née Thomas) in Utah as Edna Marie Higgins, the youngest of three daughters. She was a member of the Church of Jesus Christ of Latter-day Saints. Her elder sister was actress Dee Hartford, who was married to film director Howard Hawks.

== Death ==
Hartford died at Cedars-Sinai Medical Center in Los Angeles, California in 1983, aged 53, from endometrial cancer. Before her death she had been living in Palm Springs, California.
