= Vitina Marcus =

American actress

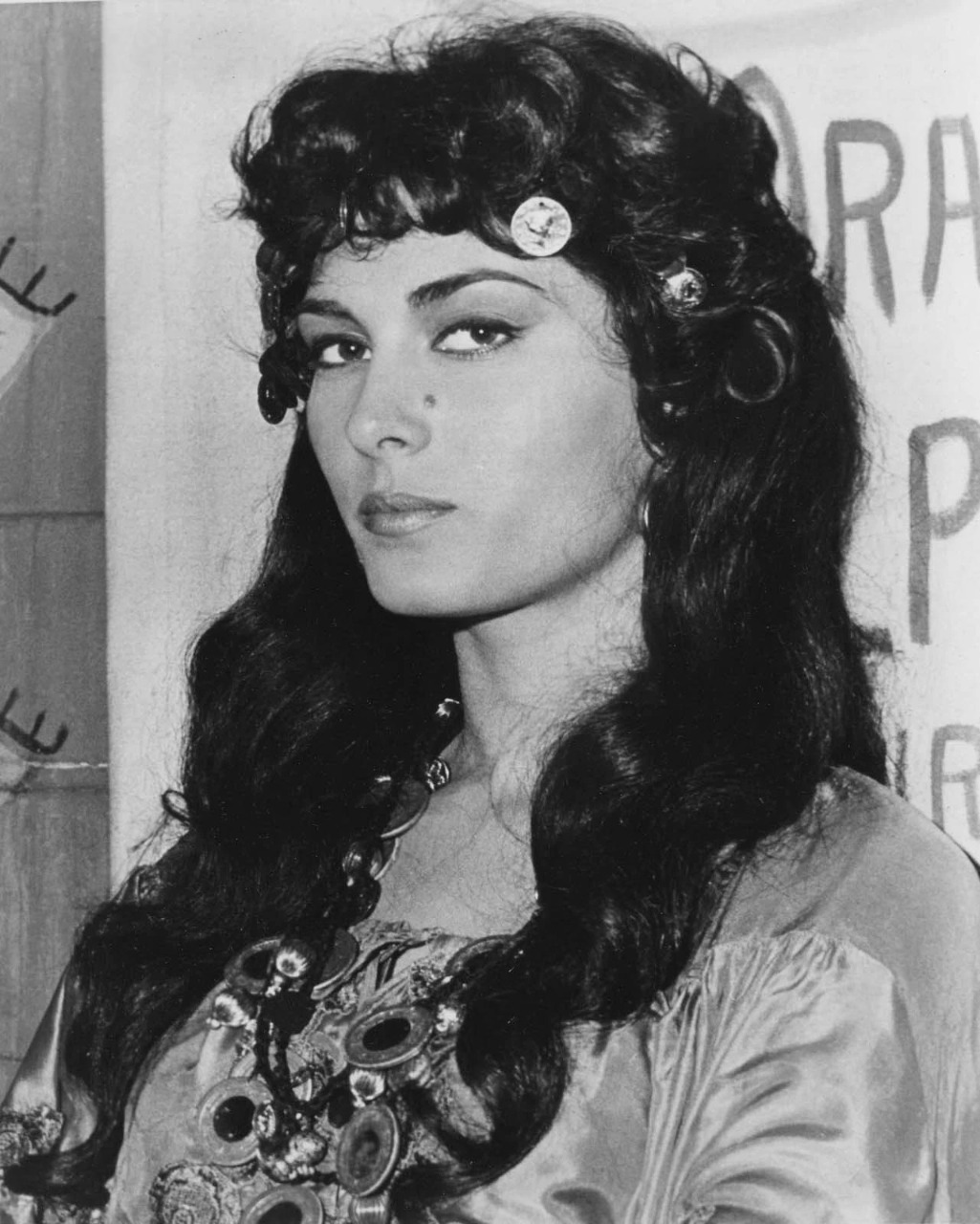
- Marcus in The Travels of Jaimie McPheeters (1964)
- Born: Dolores Vitina Marcus; March 1, 1937 (age 89); New York City, New York, U.S.
- Other name: Vitina Graham
- Occupations: Television and film actress
- Years active: 1957–1970
- Spouses: Steve Gravers (m. 1958; div. 1960) George Graham (m. 1971; div. 1979)
- Children: 2
- Website: vitinamarcus.com

Vitina Marcus (born March 1, 1937) is a retired American actress.

== Career ==
Marcus was a student of Lee Strasberg's. She appeared in numerous television shows throughout the 1950s and '60s. She was sometimes billed as Dolores Vitina, as in the 1958 film Never Love a Stranger, starring John Drew Barrymore and Steve McQueen. She was in Irwin Allen's 1960 production of The Lost World, as well as Taras Bulba (1962) with Tony Curtis and Yul Brynner.

On television, she appeared in Voyage to the Bottom of the Sea, including the first-season episode "Turn Back the Clock" (in which producer Irwin Allen reused some of her footage from The Lost World) and the second-season episode "Return of the Phantom".

She appeared in two episodes of Lost in Space as the Green Lady (Athena), an admirer of stowaway Dr. Zachary Smith's, who endangers the Jupiter II; Have Gun – Will Travel as Della White Cloud, an Apache princess; and in episodes 24 and 26 of The Time Tunnel, "Chase through Time" and "Attack of the Barbarians". Marcus was in an episode of The Man from U.N.C.L.E., "My Friend: The Gorilla Affair", in 1966. She guest-starred in the TV series Gunsmoke's episodes "The Squaw" as Natacea (1961) and "Old Comrade" as Missy (1962). In 1962, she portrayed Wahkshum in the episode "The Peddler" on CBS' Rawhide.

== Personal life ==
Marcus gave birth to a daughter and a son, the daughter with Rory Calhoun. She left Hollywood in the late 1960s, and has resided in Las Vegas since the mid-1970s, earning her real estate license in 1986. She has been in real estate since then as Vitina Graham.

== Filmography ==
Year	Title	Role	Notes
1958	Never Love a Stranger	Frances Kane	
1960	The Lost World	Native Girl	
1962	Taras Bulba	Gypsy Princess	
1964	Bedtime Story	Pretty Girl	Uncredited

== Television ==
Year	Title	Role	Notes
1957	Kraft Television Theatre	unknown (as Dolores Vitina)	"The Other Wise Man"
1958	Have Gun Will Travel	Della White Cloud (as Dolores Vitina)	"Lady on the Stagecoach"
1959	Mike Hammer	Maureena Zabreski (as Dolores Vitina)	"Doll Trouble"
1959	Death Valley Days	Cohantis (as Dolores Vitina)	"The Grand Duke"
1959	Wagon Train	Veranique (as Dolores Vitina)	"The Vittorio Bottecelli Story"
1960	Shotgun Slade	Unnamed	"The Lady and the Piano"
1961	Sea Hunt	Tali	"Mercy Ship"
1962	Rawhide	Wahkshum	S4E15 "The Peddler"
1961 and 1962	Gunsmoke	Natacea, Missy	“The Squaw” and “Old Comrade”
1964	The Travels of Jaimie McPheeters	Irina	"The Day of the Wizard"
1964	The Virginian	Raven Wing Squaw (uncredited)	"A Bride for Lars"
1964	Voyage to the Bottom of the Sea	Native Girl	"Turn Back the Clock"
1966	Voyage to the Bottom of the Sea	Lani	"The Return of the Phantom"
1966	The Man from UNCLE	Girl	"The My Friend The Gorilla Affair"
1966	Lost in Space	Lorelei	"Wild Adventure"
1967	Lost in Space	Athena	"The Girl from the Green Dimension"
1967	The Time Tunnel	Z24A19 (Zee)	"Chase Through Time"
1967	The Time Tunnel	Sarit	"Attack of the Barbarians"
1970	The F.B.I.	Linda	"Conspiracy of Corruption"
1970	To Rome with Love	Signora Cardozza	"Birds, Bees, and Romans"
1970	To Rome with Love	Professor Venturi	"The Pretty Little Girl"
