= No Place to Hide (Lost in Space) =

Unaired 1965 pilot episode

"No Place to Hide" is the unaired 1965 pilot episode produced for CBS to promote the television series Lost in Space. The episode was directed by series creator Irwin Allen.

== Plot synopsis ==
The spacecraft Gemini 12 was intended to undertake a century-long flight to Alpha Centauri, with its crew in suspended animation. The six-person crew consisted of a family of five (the Robinsons including John, Maureen, Will, Penny, and Judy.) and one geologist (Don West). The ship was damaged by a meteor storm shortly after liftoff. The resulting damage sent the Gemini 12 out of control, and it was presumed lost in space.

The disabled ship crashed on a habitable planet. After the crash, controlled regeneration awoke the crew from three years in suspended animation. After six months on the planet, the ship's captain and family patriarch, Dr. John Robinson, remained hopeful of making repairs and resuming the flight; however, the crew then began to encounter serious weather problems, requiring them to abandon the spacecraft and hurry south to avoid freezing. After encountering a giant Cyclops, discovering an abandoned castle in a cave, and undertaking the perilous crossing of an inland sea, they reached a tropical sanctuary where they were observed by aliens.

== Comparison to later series ==
The pilot featured a single-deck, sub-lightspeed, interstellar, flying saucer spacecraft known as the Gemini 12, which was renamed and redesigned as the Jupiter 2 for the actual series. Unlike the Jupiter 2, the Gemini 12 had no airlock, no seats for the pilot, very few controls at the front of the craft, no elevator, no landing gear, and a crew of only six. The ship did, however, carry a Chariot all-terrain vehicle, and the Jet Pack flying device.

The episode portrayed the entire crew as intellectually gifted or accomplished: both John and Maureen Robinson had doctoral degrees, their children were prodigies, and Don West was identified as a doctor of geology. The pilot did not include later series regulars Dr. Zachary Smith or the Robot. It was instead about the adventures of the Robinsons, a happy family. The cooperative, friendly family depicted in the pilot were somewhat less so in the series, and still more different from the dysfunctional space family depicted in the 1998 spin-off motion picture.

The theme music for this pilot was taken from the 1951 film The Day the Earth Stood Still.

Nearly all of the footage from the pilot was reused, finding its way into the first five episodes of the weekly series. Although there were obvious inconsistencies, the incorporation was nevertheless creatively carried out.

== Release ==
The 1965 pilot was not broadcast until 1993, when June Lockhart hosted the Sci-Fi Channel's first Pilot Playhouse. The special aired the pilot episodes of many sci-fi series including the Robot-less and Dr. Smith-less pilot of "Lost in Space" titled "No Place to Hide."

The pilot was released as part of a mail-order VHS box set from Columbia House, Lost in Space: The Collector's Edition, in February 1995.
