= Chester Erskine =

American film director

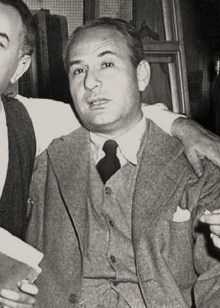
- Erskine in 1948
- Born: November 29, 1905; Hudson, New York, U.S.
- Died: April 7, 1986 (aged 80); Beverly Hills, California, U.S.
- Occupations: Director; producer; writer

Chester Erskine (November 29, 1905 – April 7, 1986) was an American director, producer, and writer of Broadway plays and films.

== Biography ==
Chester Erskine was born in Hudson, New York as Chester Eckstein. He studied for a short time at the American Academy of Dramatic Arts. His first directing job was Harlem, a 1929 all-black revue. He also directed Spencer Tracy in the Broadway production of The Last Mile in 1930. Erskine's likeness was drawn in caricature by Alex Gard for Sardi's, the New York City theater district restaurant. The picture is now part of the collection of the New York Public Library.

In 1932, he began working in Hollywood, where his best-known work includes the direction of The Egg and I and the screenplay adaptation of All My Sons.

Other films directed by Erskine include the 1949 mystery Take One False Step starring William Powell and the 1952 comedy A Girl in Every Port featuring Groucho Marx.

Erskine produced a number of films, notably The Wonderful Country, a 1959 western with Robert Mitchum.

He died in Beverly Hills, California at the age of 80.
