= A Girl in Every Port (1952 film) =

1952 American comedy film by Chester Erskine

- Theatrical release poster
- Directed by: Chester Erskine
- Screenplay by: Chester Erskine
- Based on: "A Girl in Every Port"; 6 May 1933 story in The Saturday Evening Post by Frederick Hazlitt Brennan
- Produced by: Irwin Allen; Irving Cummings Jr.
- Starring: Groucho Marx; Marie Wilson; William Bendix
- Cinematography: Nicholas Musuraca
- Edited by: Ralph Dawson
- Music by: Roy Webb
- Production company: RKO Radio Pictures
- Distributed by: RKO Pictures
- Release dates: January 8, 1952 (New York City); March 20, 1952 (Chicago); March 21, 1952 (Los Angeles)
- Running time: 86 minutes
- Country: United States
- Language: English

A Girl in Every Port is a 1952 American comedy film directed by Chester Erskine. The film stars Groucho Marx, Marie Wilson and William Bendix. It is based on the short story "They Sell Sailors Elephants" by Frederick Hazlitt Brennan.

== Plot ==
Benny Linn and Tim Dunnovan are sailors assigned to the same ship. Tim spends some inheritance money that he received to purchase a racehorse named Little Aaron. Tim’s division officer disagrees with the purchase and orders Ben to help Tim return the horse to recover his money. However, Tim has already hired a team to train Little Aaron. Benny and Tim discover that Little Aaron has a history of weak ankles and cannot run very well. However, they also learn that Little Aaron has an identical twin, Little Shamrock, who has good ankles and can run fast.

Ben and Tim scheme to switch the horses and make money in a race. They find themselves trying to juggle the expectations of their division officer, the former owner of Little Aaron, a carhop named Miss Jane, some local mobsters and their fellow sailors, who all want a piece of the action.

== Cast ==
- Groucho Marx as Benjamin Franklin "Benny" Linn
- Marie Wilson as Jane Sweet
- William Bendix as Timothy Aloysius "Tim" Dunnovan
- Don DeFore as Bert Sedgwick
- Gene Lockhart as Doc Garvey
- Dee Hartford as Millicent Temple
- Hanley Stafford as Fleet Admiral Temple
- Teddy Hart as High Life
- Percy Helton as Drive-In Manager
- George E. Stone as Skeezer

== Reception ==
In a contemporary review for The New York Times, critic A. H. Weiler wrote: "The parlay of Groucho Marx, Marie Wilson, William Bendix, to say nothing of a horse-racing mix-up, the United States Navy and sabotage should have paid off in plenty of laughs. But 'A Girl in Every Port' ... brimming with these ingredients, is merely an involved mélange of obvious antics and gags, only one or two of which are likely to generate chuckles."

Critic Mae Tinée of the Chicago Tribune wrote: "It is not customary to worry about plots in such films, but no one seems to have given this one even a passing thought. It's a sloppy hodge-podge about a couple of gobs and a couple of horses, with a lot of tired complications tossed in here and there. Strictly second-rate stuff."

== See also ==
- List of films about horse racing
