= Tobor (disambiguation) =

Tobor may refer to:

== Fictional characters ==
=== Film, television and comics ===
- Tobor, a robot in the American television series Captain Video and His Video Rangers; aired 1949-1955 on DuMont Television Network
- Tobor the Great, a robot in the 1954 film with the same name, directed by Lee Sholem for Republic Pictures. The same robot also appeared in a pilot for a TV series called Here Comes Tobor
- Tobor, protagonist in the North American translation of the Japanese manga and anime series 8 Man
- Tobor, a character in the US comic book series Sonic the Hedgehog
- Tobor, a character in the 2005 film The Adventures of Sharkboy and Lavagirl in 3-D

== Toys ==
- Tobor (toy), a children's toy
