= Tufeld =

Tufeld is a surname. Notable people with the surname include:

- Bruce Tufeld (1952–2019), American talent agent and manager
- Dick Tufeld (1926–2012), American actor
