= Spider-Woman (TV series) =

- Genre: Superhero; Action; Adventure
- Based on: Spider-Woman by: Archie Goodwin; Marie Severin
- Developed by: Jeffrey Scott
- Voices of: Joan Van Ark; Bruce Miller; Bryan Scott
- Narrated by: Dick Tufeld (Opening)
- Composer: Eric Rogers
- Country of origin: United States
- Original language: English
- No. of seasons: 1
- No. of episodes: 16

Production
- Executive producers: David H. DePatie; Friz Freleng
- Producer: Lee Gunther
- Running time: 30 minutes
- Production companies: DePatie–Freleng Enterprises; Marvel Comics Animation

Original release
- Network: ABC
- Release: September 22, 1979 – January 5, 1980

Spider-Woman is an American animated television series, based on the Marvel Comics character Spider-Woman. The series was produced by DePatie–Freleng Enterprises and Marvel Comics Animation, and aired from September 22, 1979 to January 5, 1980 on ABC. It was DePatie–Freleng's final series before its reincorporation, as Marvel Productions.

Jessica Drew is Marvel's first superheroine to star in her own animated series.

The Spider-Woman cartoon should not be confused with Web Woman, a Filmation superheroine cartoon launched at around the same time, which reportedly prompted Marvel Comics into creating a Spider-Woman character to secure the copyright.

== Premise ==
According to the title sequence, Jessica Drew was bitten by a venomous spider as a child. Her father, Dr. Alex Drew, saved her life by injecting the girl with an experimental "spider serum", which also granted her superhuman powers. As an adult, Jessica Drew is editor of Justice Magazine, with two other employees featured, such as photographer Jeff Hunt, and Drew's teenage nephew Billy. When trouble arises, Drew slips away to change into her secret identity of Spider-Woman.

== Differences between cartoon and comic book ==
The cartoon differs considerably from the comic book in its premise and supporting cast. Billy, Jeff, and Justice Magazine never appear in the comic book in any form, nor do the darker elements of the comic book (the heavy use of Arthurian legend and the occult, Jessica's feelings of social alienation) enter into the much brighter world of the cartoon. The origin of her powers is also altered somewhat. At the time of the series' production, the threat to her life in the comics was radiation poisoning (though her published origin has since been altered).

The animated Spider-Woman's powers are noticeably modified; her enhanced strength in particular seems entirely missing, as she is shown in several episodes being restrained by means (such as ordinary rope) that her super-strong comic-book counterpart could easily break. In addition to the ability to cling to walls:

- Spider-Woman retains the ability to fire bursts of energy from her hands called "venom blasts", but they are white instead of green. The episode "Realm of Darkness" seems to imply that Venom Blasts can be fired as long as Spider-Woman has enough strength.
- Spider-Woman has powers vaguely similar to ones possessed by Spider-Man that her comic book incarnation lacks:
  - A clairvoyant "spider-sense" that allows her to see dangers as they happen. No matter where she is, she can close her eyes and see the event, shown to the viewers as an image outlined by a spider-web.
  - She can also project spider-like "weblines" from the palms of her hands or an individual finger. This appears to be naturally generated, as opposed to Spider-Man's mechanical web-shooters, but she is similarly prone to running out of "web fluid" ("The Ghost Vikings"). She is able to control the direction in which her weblines move; "The Kingpin Strikes Again" shows her casting a web in a descending spiral to disorient and then restrain a criminal.
- The animated Spider-Woman also had the ability to change into costume merely by spinning around, an idea borrowed from the live-action Wonder Woman series starring Lynda Carter. In the episode "The Spider-Woman and the Fly", where Jessica had been momentarily stripped of her powers, her costume reverted to the everyday civilian clothes she wore for work.
- While Spider-Woman could (at the time) only glide on air currents in the comics, the animated version appears able to fly at will, though her costume's glider wings were apparent whenever she took flight (the comic book incarnation has since gained the power of true flight as well).
- The animated Spider-Woman would occasionally display previously unknown "spider"-powers, conveniently able to assist her in random situations, such as:
  - "Spider-telepathy", allowing her to mentally communicate with spiders and ask them for assistance ("Pyramids of Terror").
  - A protective "spider-bubble" allowing her to function underwater without diving gear ("The Ghost Vikings").
- Spider-Man in this series was voiced by Paul Soles, and some similarities to the 1967 show still remained. Perhaps the most noticeable similarity is "animated stock footage", where – before any episodes were completed – an animated sequence was created. This sequence would be used with an appropriate background added, whenever the need would arise. One example is Spider-Woman turning around, from back to front. Another example is where Jessica Drew gets a "spider-sense", turns her head while she closes her eyes, and then the location of danger appears using an editing technique.

== Cast ==
- Joan Van Ark as Jessica Drew / Spider-Woman
- Bryan Scott as Billy Drew
- Larry Carroll as Detective Miller
- Vic Perrin as Khufu
- Tony Young as Torc
- John Milford as Kingpin
- Bruce Miller as Jeff Hunt
- Lou Krugman as the Police Chief, Dormammu, Dracula, Dr. Hagel/The Fly, Spider-King
- Paul Soles as Peter Parker/Spider-Man
- Ilene Latter
- Karen Machon
- Dick Tufeld as Opening Narrator

== Episodes ==
| No. | Title | Original release date |
|---|---|---|
| 1 | "Pyramids of Terror" | September 22, 1979 |
Guest-stars Spider-Man. The Justice Magazine crew investigate an alien invasion in Egypt led by the mummy Khufu.
| 2 | "Realm of Darkness" | September 29, 1979 |
The powerful demon Dormammu emerges on a Pacific island, threatening to enslave mankind.
| 3 | "The Amazon Adventure" | October 6, 1979 |
Stolen gold from Fort Knox leads the Justice Magazine team into the Amazon where they uncover a plot by the Amazon leader Shanna to take over the world.
| 4 | "The Ghost Vikings" | October 13, 1979 |
A "ghost" Viking ship emerges off the coast of Norway. The crew plan to steal the riches of the world, before returning to their own time. Spider-Woman travels back to AD 952 to defeat them.
| 5 | "The Kingpin Strikes Again" | October 20, 1979 |
Spider-Woman confronts Kingpin and his henchmen as they rob a bank, but after taking out two of his men, one of Kingpin's minions manages to turn the tables and lock Spider-Woman up, allowing Kingpin to get the loot with the superheroine unable to do anything about it; and to add insult to injury, Kingpin later produces a concrete alibi to throw off all of Spider-Woman's implications against him for the theft. Humiliated, Spider-Woman as Jessica Drew tries to get back at the Kingpin by writing up a maligning news article about him. Angered by her recent Justice Magazine article, the Kingpin steals an experimental invisibility ray and seeks revenge on its editor Jessica Drew. However while invisible, he witnesses her transforming into Spider-Woman and opts for a blackmail plot instead.
| 6 | "The Lost Continent" | October 27, 1979 |
After United States Air Force planes vanish in the Bermuda Triangle, the team from Justice Magazine investigate. They soon find themselves thrown into a hidden dimension where dinosaurs roam the Earth.
| 7 | "The Kongo Spider" | November 3, 1979 |
Guest stars Spider-Man. While covering the filming of a movie, the Justice Magazine team encounter a giant spider (in a plot inspired by King Kong).
| 8 | "Games of Doom" | November 10, 1979 |
Athletes in the World Athletic Games in Moscow are being kidnapped and replaced by android doubles. Jessica Drew goes undercover as a long jumper to investigate.
| 9 | "Shuttle to Disaster" | November 17, 1979 |
The Justice Magazine team find themselves on a hijacked Space Shuttle, heading towards the Moon, where the villain Steeljaw intends to enslave mankind and put it to work digging for valuable gems.
| 10 | "Dracula's Revenge" | November 24, 1979 |
The world's population are threatened with being turned into vampires, werewolves, and Frankenstein's Monsters. Spider-Woman discovers that Dracula is behind this.
| 11 | "The Spider-Woman and the Fly" | December 1, 1979 |
Jessica confronts a former research assistant to her father named Dr. Hagel who has been mutated into the Fly after a lab accident. Deducing her secret identity, he creates a formula which will rob Jessica of her spider powers.
| 12 | "Invasion of the Black Hole" | December 8, 1979 |
A Darth Vader-like alien named Graviton attempts to use several UFOs to swallow the Earth in a black hole in readiness for an invasion. Spider-Woman uses her powers, including getting into a lightsaber-like duel with Graviton, to stop him.
| 13 | "The Great Magini" | December 15, 1979 |
A magician called The Great Magini attempts to steal the world's most famous landmarks.
| 14 | "A Crime in Time" | December 22, 1979 |
An experimental time machine unleashes an invasion of Wookiee-like creatures. Jessica is forced to reveal her secret identity to her fellow magazine crew in order to save mankind.
| 15 | "Return of the Spider-Queen" | December 29, 1979 |
Spider-Woman is brainwashed by an alien race of human spider creatures, who believe she is their long-lost queen.
| 16 | "The Deadly Dream" | January 5, 1980 |
Numara, another Darth Vader-like alien, threatens the world with her sleep-inducing powers.

== International versions ==
The French and Italian dubs from the early 1980s used a different theme song by Shuki Levy. Levy would later go on to be credited as the composer for Spider-Man: The Animated Series (1994) and Spider-Man Unlimited (1999). In the 2000s, a second Italian dub was made, which used the original American music rather than Levy's theme song.

== Distribution ==
=== Home video releases ===
==== Region 1 ====
In 1982, a 100 minute Spider-Woman VHS tape was released, containing several episodes. Later on in the 1980s, Prism Entertainment's Marvel Comics Video Library VHS series included three episodes of the series. Volumes 6, 13, and 23 contain the Spider-Woman episodes The Spider-Woman and the Fly, Games of Doom and Pyramids of Terror, respectively. Volume 6 was re-released in 1991, minus the bonus Spider-Man episodes.

In 2008, volume 6 was released on DVD in Canada as Spider-Woman vs. the Fly by Morningstar Entertainment.

==== Region 2 ====
In April 2008, Liberation Entertainment secured the home media rights to select Marvel shows from Jetix Europe in select European territories, including Spider-Woman. The company had plans to release the series on DVD, but in October, the company closed their UK branch; leaving the DVD release cancelled.

In 2009, Clear Vision took over the home media rights and released the complete series in a 2-disc set in Germany on July 23 and in the United Kingdom on August 3.

== Reception ==
=== Critical response ===
Bradley Russell of GamesRadar+ wrote, "Surprisingly progressive for its time, the Jessica Drew-led show sometimes featured cameos from Spider-Man and other superheroes, yet Spider-Woman was always the star of the show. It also retains some classic Silver Age campiness and blends it with an often weird, always entertaining look at a character that (hopefully) becomes more prominent in future Marvel properties." Chris Sims of Looper stated, "It's definitely every bit as clunky as you'd expect from the late '70s, but it also might be the single most buck wild superhero cartoon ever made. [...] If you're into the goofy stuff, or just want to see how the unfathomable weirdness of the Bronze Age Marvel Universe was translated directly to television, there aren't many that are going to be more fun than this one."

David Chapman of Common Sense Media gave Spider-Woman a grade of three out of five stars, praised the presence of positive role models, stating Jessica Drew is portrayed as a strong and independent female character, and complimented the presence of positive messages, saying the series depicts benevolence and resourcefulness. Lindsay E. Mack of Romper ranked Spider-Woman 25th in their "33 Classic Cartoons To Stream On Disney+ All Weekend Long" list and called it the "cartoon you didn't know you needed", saying, "It's a great chance to show your kid what superhero cartoons were like way before they (and in many cases their parents) were born."
