= H.E.R.B.I.E. =

Marvel Comics character

- H.E.R.B.I.E. as depicted on a variant cover of Fantastic Four #10 (May 2026). Art by David Nakayama.

Publication information
- Publisher: Marvel Comics
- First appearance: The New Fantastic Four "A Monster Among Us (September 9, 1978)"
- First comic appearance: Fantastic Four #209 (August 1979)
- Created by: Stan Lee (writer); Jack Kirby (artist)

In-story information
- Alter ego: Humanoid Experimental Robot, B-Type, Integrated Electronics
- Species: Robot
- Team affiliations: A.I. Army; Fantastic Four
- Abilities: Ability to connect to any computer system Electricity generators Lasers; Various hidden tools and features

H.E.R.B.I.E. (Note: Alternately an acronym for "Humanoid Experimental Robot, B-Type, Integrated Electronics" or "Highly Engineered Robot Built for Interdimensional Exploration".) is a robot character appearing in American media featuring the Marvel Comics superhero quartet, the Fantastic Four, of which H.E.R.B.I.E. is depicted as a member or supporting character. Created by the creators of Fantastic Four, writer Stan Lee and artist Jack Kirby, the character was initially conceived for the animated series The New Fantastic Four, where he was voiced by Frank Welker, beginning with its 1978 debut. The character was subsequently integrated into the comics continuity shortly afterwards.

H.E.R.B.I.E. appeared in the Marvel Cinematic Universe film The Fantastic Four: First Steps (2025), voiced by Matthew Wood.

== Creation and conception ==
When the Fantastic Four property was made into an animated series in 1978, the character of the Human Torch was not available for use in the series due to having been optioned for a motion picture which never materialized. Needing a fourth member to round out the team, Stan Lee pitched the idea for a cute robot sidekick and artist Jack Kirby, who had been hired as a storyboard artist for DePatie–Freleng Enterprises, designed it. This was Kirby's last work for Marvel.

A popular but false urban myth contends the Human Torch was replaced for the series due to fears children might attempt to emulate him by setting themselves on fire.

In the series, H.E.R.B.I.E. was voiced by Frank Welker. Shortly after the series' premiere, the character was introduced to the comics continuity by writer Marv Wolfman and artist John Byrne.

== Publication history ==
H.E.R.B.I.E. first appeared in comics in Fantastic Four #209 (August 1979), adapted from the cartoon character by Marv Wolfman and John Byrne.

The character subsequently appears in Fantastic Four #210-213 (September–December 1979), #215-217 (February–April 1980), #242 (May 1982), #244 (July 1982), Fantastic Four #3 (March 1998), Marvel Holiday Special (2004), Exiles #72 (January 2006), Fantastic Four #534 (March 2006), X-Men #181 (March 2006), Franklin Richards One Shot (April 2006), X-Men/Runaways #1 (May 2006), The Sensational Spider-Man #25 (June 2006), Fantastic Four: A Death in the Family (July 2006), Franklin Richards: Super Summer Spectacular (September 2006), Franklin Richards: Happy Franksgiving! (January 2007), Franklin Richards: Monster Mash (November 2007), Franklin Richards: Fall Football Fiasco! (January 2008).

H.E.R.B.I.E. received an entry in the All-New Official Handbook of the Marvel Universe A-Z #5 (2006).

He also appeared in All-New, All-Different Black Knight #1 in 2015, in which he appears as a part of the Black Knight’s sanctuary.

== Fictional character biography ==
H.E.R.B.I.E. was created by Mister Fantastic and Master Xar of the Xandarians, who hoped that the robot could aid their search for Galactus, whom they sought for aid in defeating the Sphinx. It is also revealed that in the comic book continuity, Johnny Storm did not show up to a meeting with a cartoon company, therefore H.E.R.B.I.E. replaced him in a cartoon series based on the Fantastic Four.

What neither of the creators realized, however, was that Doctor Sun, an enemy of Master Xar who had his consciousness trapped within Xandarian computers, escaped by jumping from the computer to H.E.R.B.I.E.'s body. The little robot was his sleeper agent, whom he could control whenever he wished. Although an alien pirate mysteriously died in H.E.R.B.I.E.'s presence, and the villain Blastaar suddenly escapes from the Negative Zone, nobody suspects that H.E.R.B.I.E. was responsible.

After Sun's attempt to assassinate the Fantastic Four with Blastaar fails, Dr. Sun reveals himself at last, trapping the Invisible Woman and the Human Torch within the Baxter Building's security system and besting Mister Fantastic and Thing with H.E.R.B.I.E.'s weapons. Sun abandons H.E.R.B.I.E.'s body and transfers his consciousness into the Baxter Building's main computer, which would allow him to control the entire building, and all of the weaponry within. Mister Fantastic locks Sun from the computer system, but H.E.R.B.I.E. realizes that Sun could simply return to his body. Not wanting the villain to cause any more trouble, H.E.R.B.I.E. throws himself into the computer, destroying it, Sun, and himself.

Later, Franklin is shown with another H.E.R.B.I.E robot, referred to as a 'flying frog'. It is explained that this one had been built partly to keep an eye on Franklin's developing powers. Said powers fluctuate due to Franklin's failure to solve a Rubik's Cube and a nearby TV show urging someone to 'grow up'. The resulting power surge destroys H.E.R.B.I.E.

After Reed Richards and his wife vanish following the "Secret Wars" storyline, much of Reed's belongings are transferred to Moon Girl. H.E.R.B.I.E. activates when Galactus appears and claims to have always had a Galactus-sensing device.

During the "Iron Man 2020" event, H.E.R.B.I.E. appears as a member of the A.I. Army.

During the "One World Under Doom" storyline, H.E.R.B.I.E. was upgraded by Mister Fantastic to pilot a special time machine to head to the event of the Big Bang in an attempt to restore the Fantastic Four's powers. After the Fantastic Four regain their powers, H.E.R.B.I.E sacrifices himself to return the Fantastic Four to the present. Mister Fantastic later states that he rebuilt H.E.R.B.I.E. with his pre-upgraded memories.

== Powers and abilities ==
H.E.R.B.I.E. has the ability to connect to any computer system. He also possesses electricity generators and lasers. He also possesses various hidden tools and features.

== Related robots ==
=== H.U.B.E.R.T. ===
Short for Hyper-Ultronic Brain Employing Randomized Tracings, H.U.B.E.R.T. was created by Mister Fantastic to be Franklin's babysitter. Franklin later unwittingly destroys H.U.B.E.R.T. before Reed builds a replacement.

=== S.H.E.R.B.I.E. ===
Short for S.H.I.E.L.D. Heuristic Experimental Robot, B-Type, Integrated Electronics, S.H.E.R.B.I.E. is a robot who is S.H.I.E.L.D.'s version of H.E.R.B.I.E.

== Other versions ==
=== Deadpool: Killustrated ===
Modified H.E.R.B.I.E. units from an alternate universe devoid of heroes appear in Deadpool: Killustrated as servants of Deadpool.

=== Franklin Richards: Son of a Genius ===
An alternate universe version of H.E.R.B.I.E. from Earth-6513 appears in Franklin Richards: Son of a Genius. This version is Franklin Richards's nanny.

=== Marvel Adventures ===
An alternate universe version of H.E.R.B.I.E. appears in Marvel Adventures Power Pack. This version is the Power Pack's nanny.

=== Marvel Mangaverse ===
An alternate universe version of H.E.R.B.I.E. from Earth-2301 appears in Marvel Mangaverse. This version is the Baxter Building's security system.

=== Marvel Zombies ===
Several H.E.R.B.I.E. units from Earth-2149 appear in Marvel Zombies. These versions serve as security for the abandoned Baxter Building.

=== Old Man Quill ===
A possible future version of H.E.R.B.I.E. appears in Old Man Quill. This version survived in the Baxter Building's wreckage for 55 years.

=== Ultimate Marvel ===
Several H.E.R.B.I.E. units from Earth-1610 appear in Ultimate Fantastic Four. These versions come in small, hovering models and large mechs that serve as guards.

== In other media ==
=== Television ===
- H.E.R.B.I.E. appears in The New Fantastic Four, voiced by Frank Welker.
- H.E.R.B.I.E. appears in Fantastic Four: World's Greatest Heroes, voiced by Sam Vincent. This version is a supercomputer who monitors Mister Fantastic's lab.
- H.E.R.B.I.E. appears in The Super Hero Squad Show, voiced by Tara Strong.
- H.E.R.B.I.E. makes a non-speaking cameo appearance in The Avengers: Earth's Mightiest Heroes episode "The Kang Dynasty".
- H.E.R.B.I.E. makes a non-speaking cameo appearance in the Ultimate Spider-Man episode "Venom".
- H.E.R.B.I.E. appears in Spidey and His Amazing Friends, voiced by Tim Dadabo.

=== Film ===
- A deactivated H.E.R.B.I.E. makes a non-speaking cameo appearance in the extended cut of Fantastic Four (2005).
- H.E.R.B.I.E. has appeared in films set in the Marvel Cinematic Universe (MCU).
  - H.E.R.B.I.E. appears in The Fantastic Four: First Steps (2025), voiced by Matthew Wood.
  - H.E.R.B.I.E. will return in the film Avengers: Doomsday (2026).

=== Video games ===
- H.E.R.B.I.E. appears in Marvel Heroes.
- H.E.R.B.I.E. appears in Pinball FX 2.
- H.E.R.B.I.E. appears as a playable character in Lego Marvel Super Heroes, voiced again by Tara Strong.
- H.E.R.B.I.E. appears in Marvel Snap.
- H.E.R.B.I.E. appears as an NPC in Marvel Rivals, voiced by Suzie Yeung.
