= Marvel Comics Video Library =

VHS collection of Marvel character cartoons

The Marvel Comics Video Library, released by Prism Entertainment, was a series of VHS and Betamax tapes that featured episodes from animated series based on Marvel Comics characters. A total of 24 tapes were released and included episodes from Spider-Man (1967), Spider-Man (1981), The Marvel Super Heroes, Fantastic Four (1978), The Incredible Hulk (1982) and Spider-Woman. Each tape ran for approximately 60 minutes and included 2 full episodes. The first episode could be from any of the included series, but the second episode was always from either the 1967 or 1981 Spider-Man series.

The volumes were released in a numerical sequence, with odd-numbered volumes featuring hero characters and even-numbered volumes featuring villains as their focus character. Each volume featured a title and cover relating to a character that appears in one or both of its episodes, with most covers also including the title of one of the episodes. The videos were released in black clamshell cases with removable labels fitted behind clear plastic sleeves, with artwork from Marvel Comics on the outside and episode descriptions on the back.

Characters featured included heroes such as Spider-Man, Hulk, Sub-Mariner, Captain America, Thor, and Iron Man, as well as villains such as Doctor Doom, the Vulture, Green Goblin, and Magneto.

The first eighteen volumes were released on September 17, 1985 at a suggested retail price of $19.95 each, positioning them as part of the emerging sell-through home video market at a time when most pre-recorded videocassettes were priced primarily for the video rental market. The first eighteen volumes each included a promotional segment announcing that twelve new volumes would follow every sixty days after the initial release. However, Prism canceled the arrangement after only two cycles: the initial eighteen-volume set and a follow-up six-volume set released in 1986, each of which was a second volume for a character or team that had appeared in the initial wave.

== Volumes ==
Each volume's spine displays only the featured character's name, while the front cover includes additional text identifying the hero or team appearing in the main episode.

Volume	Title	Main Episode(s)	Bonus Episode(s)
1	The Amazing Spider-Man	Spider-Man (1967): "The Origin of Spider-Man"	Spider-Man (1981): "The Incredible Shrinking Spider-Man"
2	Fantastic Four Vs. Doctor Doom	Fantastic Four (1978): "Meet Doctor Doom"	Spider-Man (1981): "Canon of Doom"
3	Captain America	The Marvel Super Heroes: "The Origin of Captain America" / "Wreckers Among Us" / "Enter Red Skull"	Spider-Man (1981): "The Capture of Captain America"
4	Fantastic Four vs. Magneto	Fantastic Four (1978): "The Menace of Magneto"	Spider-Man (1981): "When Magneto Speaks...People Listen"
5	The Incredible Hulk	The Incredible Hulk (1982): "When Monsters Meet"	Spider-Man (1967): "One-Eyed Idol" / "Fifth Avenue Phantom"
6	Spider-Woman vs. The Fly	Spider-Woman (1979): "Spider-Woman and the Fly"	Spider-Man (1967): "The Slippery Dr. Von Schlick" / "The Spider and the Fly"
7	Fantastic Four	Fantastic Four (1978): "The Impossible Man"	Spider-Man (1967): "Spider-Man Meets Dr. Noah Boddy" / "The Fabulous Fakir"
8	Spider-Man vs. The Sandman	Spider-Man (1981): "The Sandman Is Coming"	Spider-Man (1967): "Sands of Crime" / "Never Step On A Scorpion"
9	Iron Man	The Marvel Super Heroes: "The Death of Tony Stark" / "The Hands of the Mandarin" / "The Origin of the Mandarin"	Spider-Man (1967): "Conner's Reptiles" / "The Winged Thing"
10	Spider-Man vs. Doctor Octopus	Spider-Man (1967): "The Power of Doctor Octopus" / "Sub-Zero for Spidey"	Spider-Man (1967): "The Terrible Triumph of Doctor Octopus" / "Magic Malice"
11	The Thing	Fantastic Four (1978): "The Olympics of Space"	Spider-Man (1967): "Criminals in the Clouds"
12	Spider-Man vs. The Vulture	Spider-Man (1981): "The Vulture Has Landed"	Spider-Man (1967): "The Vulture's Prey" / "The Dark Terrors"
13	Spider-Woman	Spider-Woman: "Games of Doom"	Spider-Man (1981): "Doctor Doom - Master of the World"
14	Fantastic Four vs. The Mole Man	Fantastic Four (1978): "The Mole Man"	Spider-Man (1967): "Spider-Man Battles the Molemen"
15	Sub-Mariner	The Marvel Super Heroes: "The Start of The Quest" / "Escape to Nowhere" / "A Prince There Was"	Spider-Man (1981): "The Wrath of Sub-Mariner"
16	Spider-Man vs. Green Goblin	Spider-Man (1981): "Revenge of The Green Goblin"	Spider-Man (1967): "Diet of Destruction" / "The Witching Hour"
17	The Mighty Thor	The Marvel Super Heroes: "Enter Hercules" / "When Meet Immortals" / "Whom the Gods Would Destroy"	Spider-Man (1967): "Neptune's Nose Cone"
18	Captain America vs. The Red Skull	The Marvel Super Heroes: "The Origin of the Red Skull" / "Lest Tyranny Triumph" / "The Red Skull Lives"	Spider-Man (1981): "Arsenic and Aunt May"
19	The Amazing Spider-Man, Vol. 2	Spider-Man (1981): "The Unfathomable Professor Gizmo"	Spider-Man (1967): "Phantom From The Depths of Time"
20	The Mighty Thor, Vol. 2	The Marvel Super Heroes: "The Absorbing Man" / "In My Hands, This Hammer" / "Vengeance of the Thunder God"	Spider-Man (1967): "Spider-Man Meets Skyboy"
21	Captain America, Vol. 2	The Marvel Super Heroes: "The Sleeper Shall Awake" / "Where Walks the Sleeper" / "The Final Sleep"	Spider-Man (1967): "To Cage A Spider"
22	Fantastic Four, Vol. 2	Fantastic Four (1978): "Phantom of Film City"	Spider-Man (1967): "Double Identity" / "To Catch A Spider"
23	Spider-Woman, Vol. 2	Spider-Woman: "Pyramids of Terror"	Spider-Man (1967): "The Return of the Flying Dutchman" / "Farewell Performance"
24	The Incredible Hulk, Vol. 2	The Incredible Hulk (1982): "Prisoner of the Monster"	Spider-Man (1967): "Fountain of Terror" / "Fiddler On The Loose"

== DVD release ==
Several DVD volumes were released in 2008 by Morningstar Ent. in Canada. However, these were direct Betamax transfers, (using the Betamax BII linear audio track which resulted in muffled sound, even though all the Beta releases had had their audio recorded in Beta Hi-Fi) and were not remastered in any way, apparently because of legal reasons. Also, none of the DVDs mention MARVEL COMICS or ENTERTAINMENT anywhere. There were two box-sets released, each comprising three separate DVDs within a slipcover; one entitled "Heroes" and the other one "Villains".

They included:

- Fantastic Four vs Doctor Doom: Meet Doctor Doom (only available within the "Villains" box-set and not sold separately)
- The Incredible Hulk: When Monsters Meet
- Spider-Woman vs The Fly
- Fantastic Four: The Impossible Man
- Spider-Man vs Doctor Octopus: The Power of Doctor Octopus
- Spider-Man vs The Vulture: The Vulture Has Landed
- The Mighty Thor: Enter Hercules
- Captain America vs The Red Skull
- Spider-Man: "Mutant Agenda"
