= Wakamba! =

1955 documentary directed by Edgar M. Queeny

- Directed by: Edgar M. Queeny
- Screenplay by: Charles L. Tedford
- Produced by: Edgar M. Queeny
- Cinematography: Edgar M. Queeny; Fort B. Guerin Jr.
- Edited by: V. C. Lewis
- Music by: Howard Jackson
- Production companies: American Museum of Natural History; Jarville Studios
- Distributed by: RKO Radio Pictures
- Release date: June 29, 1955 (US)
- Running time: 65 minutes
- Country: United States
- Language: English

Wakamba! is a 1955 American docudrama film which takes place in Kenya. It is a dramatized presentation of some of the social customs of the Bantu people, as represented through a young native hunter, Tandu. Narrated by Paul E. Prentiss, the film was a co-production of the American Museum of Natural History and Jarville Studios, and was released by RKO Radio Pictures on June 29, 1955.
