= Bob May (actor) =

American actor and stuntman (1939–2009)

- Born: September 4, 1939; New York City, New York, United States
- Died: January 18, 2009 (aged 69); Lancaster, California, United States
- Occupations: Actor; stuntman
- Years active: 1941–2009
- Spouse: Judith
- Website: robot-b9.com

Bob May (September 4, 1939 – January 18, 2009) was an American actor best remembered for playing The Robot on the television series Lost in Space, which debuted in 1965 and ran until 1968. May appeared in all 83 episodes inside a prop costume built by Bob Stewart; the robot's voice was dubbed by Dick Tufeld, who was also the narrator of the series.

== Acting and stunt career ==
Born in New York City, May was the grandson of vaudeville comedian Chic Johnson, half of the Olsen and Johnson comedy team famed for their blackout gags and orchestrated mayhem. May's first experience in show business came when he was two years old, when his grandfather had him appear in the Hellzapoppin comedy review, together with his partner Ole Olsen.

May became an actor, stage performer, stuntman, director and public speaker, appearing in several films together with Jerry Lewis, including The Nutty Professor. He also performed in several television series, including The Time Tunnel (where he played the role of Adolf Hitler in the 1967 episode titled "The Kidnappers"), McHale's Navy and The Red Skelton Show. May also worked as a stuntman, performing in television programs and movies of the 1950s and 1960s, among them Cheyenne, Hawaiian Eye, Palm Springs Weekend, Stagecoach, Surfside 6, The Roaring Twenties and 77 Sunset Strip.

=== Lost in Space ===
June Lockhart, who played Maureen Robinson in the series, said that May had insisted he got the job because he fit in the robot suit. Irwin Allen, the creator of the Lost in Space television series, selected May to fill the role of the robot, the sidekick of the Robinson family, after May was sent to see him about the part; Allen promised May, "If you can fit in the suit, you've got the job". Bob donned the suit for the first time in front of Allen, and made the suit fit. When he exited the suit (which was made of metal and fiberglass) for the first time, he was cut and bleeding, but very happy that he had gotten the part.

The voice of the robot was primarily performed by the show's announcer Dick Tufeld, including the show's catch phrase, "Danger, danger, Will Robinson." However, May's own voice can be heard when the robot's voice overlaps the other characters' lines and during instances of the robot singing. May enjoyed playing the part inside the robot, describing the suit as his "home away from home". It was so difficult to get inside the suit, that he would stay inside even during breaks in filming. Because he couldn't respond to external cues, he would learn the lines of all of the actors in each show so that he would know when it was his line. During breaks, he would puff on a cigarette inside the suit, with the smoke coming out of the suit amusing other members of the cast. Bob's suit was even fitted inside with an ashtray. Once Allen showed up on the set in between shooting and saw smoke billowing up out of the suit. He wasn't aware that Bob was still inside, and thought that the suit was on fire. When he saw that it was Bob smoking inside the suit, he told him that in the future, whenever the script called for the suit to issue smoke, that Bob should be the one to make it happen.

The robot costume had been created by art director and production designer Robert Kinoshita, who had been the designer of Robby the Robot from the 1956 film Forbidden Planet. Though the regularly used robot required someone to be inside, there were some shots filmed during the third season of the series that used an unoccupied "stunt robot" in certain long shots.

For years, May was a regular at autograph conventions in the Los Angeles area and around the country, sought after by fans of the show. One Los Angeles-based convention, Gallifrey One, has named its annual charity auction in May's memory. May was never too busy for his fans, he once remarked: "I will stay at any convention signing autographs until the last fan was finished, or the cleaning crew forces me to leave."

Though the robot character appeared in the 1998 Lost in Space film, with Dick Tufeld reprising his role as the robot's voice, May did not fill the role of fitting inside the robot in the movie remake.

== Personal ==
May's home in an upscale mobile home park in the San Fernando Valley was destroyed in the November 2008 California wildfires that hit the Los Angeles area, though he and his wife were able to escape without injury.

May died at age 69 on January 18, 2009, at a hospital in Lancaster, California, of congestive heart failure. He was survived by his wife Judith, son Martin, daughter Deborah and four grandchildren.

He is interred in San Fernando Mission Cemetery.
