= Robert Kinoshita =

American artist and production designer (1914–2014)

- Born: February 24, 1914; Los Angeles, California, U.S.
- Died: December 9, 2014 (aged 100); Torrance, California, U.S.
- Occupations: Art director, Set designer, Production designer

Robert Kinoshita (February 24, 1914 – December 9, 2014) was an American artist, art director, set and production designer who worked in the American film and television industries from the 1950s through the early 1980s.

== Biography ==
Kinoshita was born in Los Angeles and grew up in Boyle Heights neighborhood. After graduating from Roosevelt High School, he went to the University of Southern California to study architecture. Kinoshita graduated from USC in 1940 with a bachelor's degree in architecture and design. During World War II, Kinoshita and his wife Lillian Matsuyama were interned at the Poston War Relocation Center in Arizona following the signing of Executive Order 9066. His career as a screenwriter started with Hundred Men and a Girl in 1937, while it took several years post war before he returned to the big screen in 1956 for the special effects tasks and built the famous Robby the Robot in Forbidden Planet, although without credit.

== Robots and Kinoshita ==
Kinoshita is best known as the designer of two of the most famous robots in science fiction: Robby the Robot from the films Forbidden Planet in 1956 and The Invisible Boy in 1957; and Environmental Control Robot from the 1960s TV series Lost in Space, which was called "Robot".

Reported costs for Robby the Robot's construction range from $100,000-$125,000. Measuring around 7 feet (213 cm) tall, Robby was the result of the efforts of a number of individuals, although the final design as it appeared in Forbidden Planet is usually attributed to Kinoshita, who was head draftsman of the art department, and who produced the working drawings and blueprints for Robby's construction under the supervision of art director A. Arnold "Buddy" Gillespie at MGM.

== As an art director for films ==
Around April 1965, Irwin Allen hired Kinoshita as the art director for the Lost in Space series. Two of Kinoshita's tasks were to design a robot (which he nicknamed "Blinky") and to redesign the pilot film's Gemini XII space ship into what would become the Jupiter 2. This robot never had a real name—only the model number "B9." In the show he was referred to as "the robot" or called by the generic name, "Robot." He was brought to life by the combination of actor Bob May and voice actor Dick Tufeld. Two of Kinoshita's famous robots appeared faceplate-to-faceplate in the Lost in Space episodes "War of the Robots" and "Condemned of Space", where Robby the Robot appeared as a guest robotoid and robot, respectively.

Among his credits are art direction on four other well-known TV shows: Highway Patrol (1955–1959), Bat Masterson (1960–1961), Hawaii Five-O (1970–1971), and Kojak (1973–1974). Kinoshita also contributed production design to several features including The Phantom Planet (1961). The B9 robot fan club provided photos of Kinoshita on his 94th birthday as well as an interview. Robert Kinoshita turned 100 in February 2014 and died in December 2014.

== Filmography ==
=== Production Designer ===
- Hundred Men and a Girl, directed by Henry Koster (1937)
- Luke and the Tenderfoot (1955) – TV series (2 episodes)
- The Rebel Returns to Town, directed by Alfred L. Werker (1956)
- The Black Sleep, directed by Reginald LeBorg (1956)
- Star Broken, directed by Lesley Selander (1956)
- Pharaoh's Curse, directed by Lee Sholem (1957)
- Science Fiction Theatre (1956–1957), TV series (14 episodes)
- Rock All Night, directed by Roger Corman (1957)
- Teenage Doll, directed by Roger Corman (1957)
- Here Comes Tobor, directed by Duke Goldstone (1957) – TV movie
- Harbor Command (1957–1958) – TV series (14 episodes)
- The Rough Riders (1958) – TV series
- Mackenzie's Raiders (1958–1959) – TV series
- Highway Patrol (1959), TV series (5 episodes)
- Bold Venture (1959), TV series
- Tombstone Territory (1957–1959), TV series
- World of Giants (1959), TV series (1 episode)
- Adventures in the bottom of the sea (1958–1959), TV series
- Bat Masterson (1959), TV series
- Lock Up (1959–1960), TV series (5 episodes)

=== Art Director ===
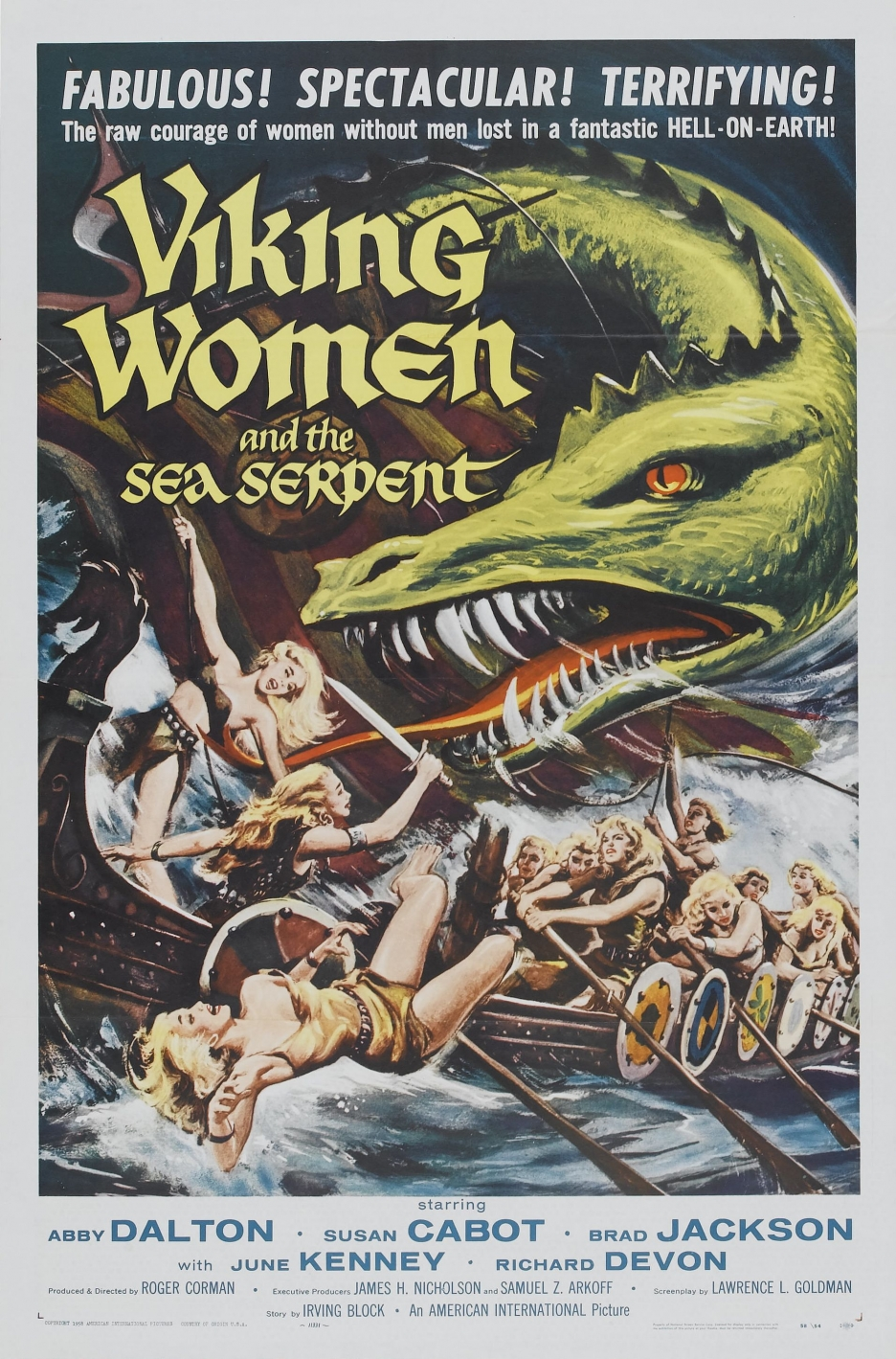
Poster of the film The Saga of the Viking Women and Their Voyage to the Waters of the Great Sea Serpent

- Science Fiction Theatre (1955), TV series
- Macabre, directed by William Castle (1958)
- The Saga of the Viking Women and Their Voyage to the Waters of the Great Sea Serpent, directed by Roger Corman (1957)
- The Path of Vengeance, directed by Mark Stevens (1958)
- The Love of a Geisha (Tokyo After Dark), directed by Norman T. Herman (1959)
- Men Into Space (1959–1960) – TV series
- The Nun and the Sergeant of Franklin Adreon director (1962)
- Ripcord (1962) – TV series (1 episode)
- Lost in Space (1965–1967) – TV series
- Mash: The Private War of Sgt. O'Farrell, directed by Frank Tashlin (1968)
- Hawaii Five-O (1970–1971) – TV series (24 episodes)
- The Six Million Dollar Man: Wine, Women and War, directed by Russ Mayberry (1973) – TV movie
- Lieutenant Kojak (1973–1974) – TV series (8 episodes)
- Planet Earth, directed by Marc Daniels (1974)
- Ironside (1974) – TV series (1 episode)
- The Dead Don't Die, directed by Curtis Harrington (1975) – TV movie
- The Streets of San Francisco (1976) – TV series (2 episodes)
- Terror at 12,000 meters, Directed by Robert Butler (1976) – TV movie
- Project U.F.O. (1978) – TV series (12 episodes)
- Barnaby Jones (1978–1979) – TV series (23 episodes)
- Belle Starr, directed by John A. Alonzo (1980)
- The Gong Show Movie, directed by Chuck Barris (1981)
- Going Ape!, Directed by Jeremy Joe Kronsberg (1981)
- Matt Houston (1982) – TV series (1 episode)
- Girls of the White Orchid, directed by Jonathan Kaplan (1983) – TV movie
- Lovelines, directed by Rod Amateau (1984)
- Cover Up (1984) – TV series (3 episodes)

=== Producer ===
- The Phantom Planet, directed by William Marshall (1961)
- Hell's Bloody Devils, directed by Al Adamson (1970)
