= Scognamillo =

Scognamillo is an Italian surname. Notable people with the surname include:

- Gabriel Scognamillo (1906–1974), Italian art director
- Giovanni Scognamillo (1929–2016), Turkish film critic
- Stefano Scognamillo (born 1994), Italian footballer of Russian origin
