= The New Fantastic Four =

Television series

- Genre: Superhero; Action; Adventure
- Created by: Stan Lee
- Based on: Fantastic Four by: Stan Lee; Jack Kirby
- Written by: Stan Lee
- Directed by: Brad Case
- Voices of: Mike Road; Ginny Tyler; Ted Cassidy; Frank Welker
- Narrated by: Dick Tufeld
- Theme music composer: Dean Elliott; Eric Rogers
- Country of origin: United States
- Original language: English
- No. of seasons: 1
- No. of episodes: 13

Production
- Executive producer: Lee Gunther
- Producers: David H. DePatie; Friz Freleng
- Editors: David H. DePatie, Jr.; Richard Gannon; Richard Corwin
- Running time: 21–22 minutes
- Production companies: DePatie–Freleng Enterprises; Marvel Comics Animation

Original release
- Network: NBC
- Release: September 9 – December 16, 1978

Related
- The Fantastic Four (1967); Fantastic Four (1994)

The New Fantastic Four (on-screen title: The Fantastic Four) is an American animated series produced by DePatie–Freleng Enterprises and Marvel Comics Animation in 1978. It is the second animated series based on Marvel's comic book series Fantastic Four, following a 1967 series produced by Hanna-Barbera Productions.

The 1978 series replaced Johnny Storm with a robot named H.E.R.B.I.E. (Humanoid Experimental Robot, B-type, Integrated Electronics) as the rights to the Human Torch were tied up with Universal Pictures at the time for a proposed film that was never made.

Ownership of the series passed to Disney in 2001 when Disney acquired Fox Kids Worldwide, which also includes Marvel Productions.

== Plot ==
After getting exposed to cosmic radiation, Reed Richards, Susan Storm and the Thing, alongside their robot H.E.R.B.I.E., fight crime as the Fantastic Four.

== Cast ==
=== Main cast ===
- Ted Cassidy - Thing / Ben Grimm, Sandman (in "The Frightful Four")
- Mike Road - Mister Fantastic / Reed Richards
- Dick Tufeld - Narrator
- Ginny Tyler - Invisible Girl / Susan Richards, Queen Sebel (in "The Diamond of Doom"), Queen Niel (in "The Diamond of Doom")
- Frank Welker - H.E.R.B.I.E., Impossible Man (in "The Impossible Man")

=== Additional voices ===
- Jack Angel (uncredited) - Eddie (in "The Impossible Man"), Joey (in "The Impossible Man")
- William Boyett (uncredited) - Grogan (in "The Impossible Man")
- Joan Gerber - Medusa
- Don Messick - Wizard (in "The Frightful Four"), Gorgon (in "Medusa and the Inhumans"), J.J. Colossal (in "The Phantom of Film City")
- Marvin Miller (uncredited) - Blastaar (in "Blastaar, the Living Bomb Burst")
- Gene Moss - Sandro (in "The Olympics of Space"), Trapster (in "The Frightful Four"), Dean Johnson (in "Calamity on the Campus")
- Vic Perrin - Inhuman Guard (in "Medusa and the Inhumans")
- Hal Smith - Karnak (in "Medusa and the Inhumans"), Mole Man (in "The Mole Man"), Monstro (in "The Olympics of Space")
- John Stephenson - Doctor Doom, Magneto (in "The Menace of Magneto"), Professor Gregson Gilbert (in "Calamity on the Campus"), Presenter at Science Convention (in "The Final Victory of Doctor Doom")
- Nancy Wible - Crystal (in "Medusa and the Inhumans")

== Episode list ==
No.	Title	Written by	Original release date	Prod. code
1	"A Monster Among Us"	Stan Lee	September 9, 1978	101
A spaceship containing a giant alien monster crash-lands on Earth and heads for New York. The Fantastic Four must find a way to contain the giant alien monster before a second spaceship arrives.
2	"The Menace of Magneto"	Stan Lee	September 16, 1978	102
Magneto challenges Mister Fantastic for leadership of the Fantastic Four. Magneto wins and makes the team commit crimes disguised as good deeds. Notes: This episode lifts its conclusion from Incredible Hulk #6 in which Hulk used a cardboard gun to trick Metal Master into believing he lost his powers.
3	"The Phantom of Film City"	Story by : Roy Thomas; Teleplay by : Stan Lee	September 23, 1978	103
When the Fantastic Four are invited to make an epic film adventure, the movie set is plagued by the mysterious Phantom of Film City and some all too real Skrull actors.
4	"Medusa and the Inhumans"	Stan Lee	September 30, 1978	104
Upon investigating reports of mysterious beings living in the Alps, the Fantastic Four are captured by the Inhumans led by Medusa who are making plans to take over the Earth. Notes: Based on Fantastic Four #45 by Jack Kirby and Stan Lee.
5	"The Diamond of Doom"	Story by : Stan Lee; Teleplay by : Christy Marx	October 7, 1978	105
Queen Sebel of Manopal hires the Fantastic Four to retrieve the Great White Stone that was stolen from her not knowing what Queen Sebel plans to do with the Great White Stone.
6	"The Mole Man"	Stan Lee	October 14, 1978	106
When power plants from all over the world sink beneath the Earth, the Fantastic Four discover that Mole Man is behind this. Notes: Based on Fantastic Four #1 by Jack Kirby and Stan Lee.
7	"The Olympics of Space"	Roy Thomas	October 21, 1978	107
Thing is abducted by aliens and forced to compete on the Moon in a contest between warring factions. Thing ends up fighting the other alien race's champion Monstro.
8	"The Fantastic Four Meet Doctor Doom"	Stan Lee	October 28, 1978	111
Doctor Doom introduces himself to the Fantastic Four and takes them back to Latveria where he forces them into going back in time and recovering the treasure of Blackbeard. Notes: Based on Fantastic Four #5 by Jack Kirby and Stan Lee.
9	"The Frightful Four"	Story by : Stan Lee; Teleplay by : Bob Stitzel, Bob Johnson	November 4, 1978	108
In order to combat the Fantastic Four, Wizard brings together Medusa, Sandman, and Trapster to form the Frightful Four. Notes: Based on Fantastic Four #36 by Jack Kirby and Stan Lee.
10	"Calamity on the Campus"	Roy Thomas	November 11, 1978	109
Professor Gregson Gilbert introduces his creation Dragon Man to the Fantastic Four in order to use it for good. However, Gilbert's assistant George steals the controls to Dragon Man in order to use it for his own purposes. Notes: Based on Fantastic Four #35 by Jack Kirby and Stan Lee.
11	"The Impossible Man"	Stan Lee	November 18, 1978	110
A green alien that can do anything lands on Earth and is called Impossible Man by the criminal Grogan as he befriends him and his gang. Now the Fantastic Four must find a way to expose Grogan to Impossible Man and get him off Earth. Notes: Based on Fantastic Four #11 by Jack Kirby and Stan Lee.
12	"The Final Victory of Doctor Doom"	Stan Lee	December 9, 1978	112
Doctor Doom blackmails the United States into making him its leader causing the Fantastic Four to spring into action.
13	"Blastaar, the Living Bomb Burst"	Story by : Roy Thomas; Teleplay by : Stan Lee	December 16, 1978	113
Mister Fantastic discovers the Negative Zone and unknowingly lets Blastaar onto Earth who goes on a rampage. Notes: Based on Fantastic Four #63 by Jack Kirby and Stan Lee.

== Marvel Mash-Up ==
In July 2012, scenes from Fantastic Four were re-cut, edited, and re-dubbed into comical shorts as part of Disney XD's Marvel Mash-Up series of shorts for their "Marvel Universe on Disney XD" block of programming.

== Production ==
DePatie–Freleng Enterprises had initially been slated to produce the Godzilla series while Hanna-Barbera was to produce The New Fantastic Four, but when Lee Gunther at DePatie–Freleng acquired the rights to the Fantastic Four, Hanna-Barbera objected, and this led to NBC brokering a deal between the studios wherein DePatie–Freleng would produce The New Fantastic Four while Hanna-Barbera would produce Godzilla.

Universal Pictures executive Frank Price had optioned several Marvel Comics characters in 1978 including the Human Torch for development as live-action TV projects and thus other studios could not use him. The live-action The Human Torch project was scrapped due to internal concerns that younger viewers would attempt to mimic the character through self-immolation. With the rights to one of the central characters tied up, Fantastic Four co-creator Stan Lee conceived a new fourth member of the team that was inspired by R2-D2 from Star Wars. Dave Cockrum was initially asked to draw concept art for the robot character, but he hated the idea of replacing the Human Torch and submitted intentionally bad designs that resembled household objects with wheels. The assignment was handed off to Fantastic Four co-creator Jack Kirby, who designed a streamlined flying robot named ZZ-123 that would be renamed to H.E.R.B.I.E.

When the series was initially set up at Hanna-Barbera, Mark Evanier who wrote for the Hanna-Barbera line of Gold Key Comics heard the company wanted an art style inspired by Jack Kirby's work, which led to Evanier contacting the animation director to say Kirby was available to work on the show. Kirby was allowed to work on the show with Marvel Comics agreeing Kirby's work on the series would count towards the requirements of his contract with Marvel. During their time working on the series, Marvel Comics then under the stewardship of President James Galtan decided they should become an animation company so they could deal with networks and not have to sell the rights to their properties leading to the company partnering with DePatie–Freleng and forming Marvel Productions.

While certain episodes were direct adaptations of comic stories, several alterations were made for time limitations and adherence to Broadcast Standards and Practices. Writer Roy Thomas, who worked on the series alongside Lee and Kirby, spoke about the limitations they encountered such as how the Thing was not allowed to hit either people or monsters. Depictions of guns and firearms were also strictly prohibited, with Thomas crafting a scenario where Skrulls were using Star Trek-esque Phasers and receiving a note from the network, stating "No guns of any kind!".

In a private correspondence to Margaret Loesch, Stan Lee expressed dissatisfaction with the show's quality, and wanted to make changes for a second season. The show was cancelled after one season due to the death of Ted Cassidy, who voiced the Thing, and opposition from NBC president Fred Silverman, who considered this adaptation to be of poor quality.

== Broadcast ==
The series was broadcast on NBC from September 9, 1978 through September 1, 1979. The series was never rebroadcast in the United States after its initial airing.

== Home media ==
=== Region 1 ===
Episodes of the series were included on Prism Entertainment's Marvel Comics Video Library series. The show appeared on Volumes 2 and 7 of the series.

Morningstar Entertainment has released 2 episodes on Region 1 DVD in Canada, however both The Impossible Man and Meet Dr. Doom are reissues of Volumes 2 and 7 of the 1980s Prism Entertainment Marvel Comics Video Library. Both DVDs were mastered from VHS copies of those old releases, and therefore contain the Spider-Man episodes that were added on as bonus episodes to the VHS releases. Meet Doctor Doom is only available in the Villains Gift Set by Morningstar.

=== Region 2 ===
In April 2008, Liberation Entertainment secured the home media rights to select Marvel shows from Jetix Europe in select European territories, including The New Fantastic Four. The company had plans to release the series on DVD, but in October, the company closed their UK branch; leaving the DVD release cancelled.

In 2009, Clear Vision took over the home media rights and released the complete series in a 2-disc set titled The Fantastic Four: The Complete Series on March 1, 2010 in the United Kingdom.
