= Robot (Lost in Space) =

Fictional character

- Lost in Space character
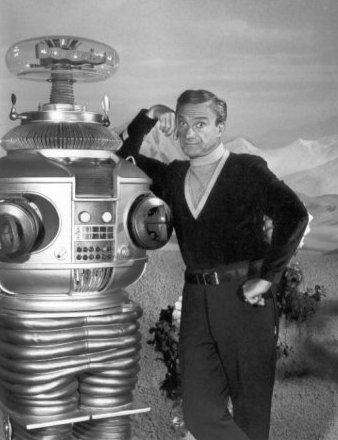
- The Robot with Dr. Zachary Smith (Jonathan Harris)
- Created by: Robert Kinoshita
- Portrayed by: Bob May
- Voiced by: Dick Tufeld

In-universe information
- Aliases: Robot Model B-9, Class YM-3, Environmental Control Robot, The Robinson's Robot
- Species: Robot
- Height: 6 ft 6 inch (2m)
- Weight: 550 lbs (249.48 kg)

The Environmental Control Robot, also known simply as the Robot, is a fictional character in the television series Lost in Space. His full designation was only occasionally mentioned on the show.

== History ==
Although a machine endowed with superhuman strength and futuristic weaponry, he often displayed human characteristics, such as laughter, sadness, and mockery, as well as singing and playing the guitar. With his major role often being to protect the youngest member of the crew, the Robot's catchphrases were "That does not compute" and "Danger, Will Robinson!", accompanied by flailing his arms.

The Robot was performed by Bob May in a prop costume built by Bob Stewart. The voice was primarily dubbed by Dick Tufeld, who was also the series' narrator, and Jorge Arvizu for the Spanish dubbing. The Robot was designed by Robert Kinoshita, who also designed Forbidden Planet's Robby the Robot. Both robots appear together in Lost in Space episode #20, "War of the Robots", and in episode #60, "Condemned of Space". The Robot did not appear in the unaired pilot episode, but was added to the series once it had been greenlit.

Initially, the bellows-covered legs were articulated, and were moved separately by the actor inside. However, the metal edges inside the suit cut actor Bob May's legs, so changes were made. The legs were bolted together, and the robot was pulled along by a wire instead of walking as it had done before. A new lower section was constructed with the legs cut off at the knee. This was filmed either in close-up or behind something to obscure the actor's feet protruding out the bottom; this version of the suit was informally referred to by the cast and crew as "the Bermuda shorts".

== Features and abilities ==
Robot consisted, from top down, of

1. A glass bubble sensor unit with moving antennae;
2. A fluted, translucent ring collar (actually an arrangement of shaped ribs, through which performer Bob May could see);
3. A cylindrical, rotating trunk section with extending bellows arms that terminated in red mechanical claws. The trunk section had controls, indicators, a small sliding translucent door through which data tapes, similar to punched tape, could be accessed ("The Hungry Sea"), a removable power pack and a signature chest light that illuminated in synchrony with the Robot's speech (May had a key inside the suit that he would tap in time with his speech to illuminate the light, resulting in some scenes where one of the claws can be seen moving in time with the light);
4. Bellows legs that were understood to move with some agility but which, due to real-world practical limitations, were rarely seen on camera to move separately; and
5. Trapezoidal continuous track units at the bottom of each leg. These normally paired as a single locomotive device, but they also could function as individual feet. The leg and tractor sections apparently could be readily detached, allowing the Robot to be positioned in the rear of the Chariot ATV, although the actual disconnect operation was depicted only once.

According to the series

1. The Robot possessed powerful computers that allowed him to make complex calculations and to deduce many facts;
2. He had a variety of sensors that detected numerous phenomena and dangers;
3. He was programmed with extensive knowledge on many subjects, including how to operate the Jupiter 2 spaceship;
4. His construction allowed him to function in extreme environments and in the vacuum of space;
5. He was extremely strong, giving him utility both in performing difficult labor and in fighting when necessary. Moreover, his claws could fire laser beams and, most frequently, a powerful "electro-force" that was similar to arcing electricity.

In one first season episode, Doctor Zachary Smith was seen to remove the robot's programming tapes, which resemble a small reel of magnetic tape, from a hatch below the robot's chest panel.

== After Lost in Space ==
Two versions of the robot were used during Lost in Space filming – a "hero robot" costume worn by Bob May, and a static, "stunt robot" prop that was used for distant or hazardous shots. Both versions fell into disrepair after the series, but these have since been discovered and restored. The "hero" was privately owned by TV and film producer Kevin Burns, who commissioned a replica in the early 1990s for touring and conventions. The "stunt robot" was on display at the Science Fiction Museum and Hall of Fame in Seattle, Washington from 2004 until it was offered at auction by Heritage Auctions in 2023.

Like Robby the Robot, the Robot prop costume was re-used on at least one other show. On the Saturday morning children's show Mystery Island, it was modified to make the primary character "P.O.P.S." There it had different domes, different color scheme, and an added rectangular skirt of gold-colored tubes, covering the rubber bellows legs and base.

Full-size replicas of the robot are available commercially. Other versions have been built by hobbyists around the world, who have built at least 15 detailed full-size replicas of the Robot.

An animated special of Lost in Space was produced in 1973. Vastly different from the original series, the special only retained the characters of Dr. Smith (voiced by Jonathan Harris) and the Robot, now called "Robon" and bearing a distinctly purple paint job. Its design was similar to that of the original, though with its retractable arms on the sides of its torso rather than in the front. Its voice was provided by Don Messick.

In the 1998 film, the Robot is originally a sleeker design equipped with weapons, but its original form is destroyed during a fight on an alien ship. Will is able to download most of its consciousness before the robot's original body is destroyed, filling in the gaps with extracts of his own neural patterns, and eventually manages to build a new body for it that bears a resemblance to its appearance in the original series.

In 2004's unsold pilot The Robinsons: Lost in Space, the Robot was not standard equipment on the Jupiter 2, but had been built by Will Robinson to protect him from bullies at school. Will brought it along on the journey in a partially-disassembled state, and when the mothership transporting the various Jupiter modules to a safe haven was attacked and the Jupiter 2 was cast away from the main group, Will hooked the Robot up to the ship's systems to provide them the power needed to escape the aliens. This Robot was of a more humanoid appearance, though missing its arms and legs (which were presumably in storage), and had shining round blue eyes in an otherwise featureless face.

In the 2018 Netflix series, the Robot is an alien AI within a skeletal-looking body which bears only a few characteristics in common with earlier versions, such as his famous line and his loyalty to Will, with its combat form resembling the tank from the 1998 movie. The Robot was the cause of the colony ship Resolute's destruction in the beginning of the series when it came to reclaim the engine and another of its kind dubbed Scarecrow, which were powering the Resolute. Its attack trapped the Robinsons and other colonists on a doomed planet, but after befriending Will Robinson and developing the equivalent to a soul, it sacrificed itself to protect the Robinsons from SAR, the Second Alien Robot the Robinsons encounter.

The Resolute and the Robot soon jumped to the Robot's home system, where it and Will are eventually reunited after SAR's destruction. After integrating a new alien engine into the Resolute, the Robot turned on Will after saving the dying Scarecrow from being tortured, but after failing to try and hijack the ship to return to its home planet to repair Scarecrow, it helps the children hijack a Jupiter so they can return to the planet after Hastings, a high ranking member of the crew, tried to kill them. The Robot stays behind to fight off Hastings and the guards so that Will and Ben Adler, a human they befriended, can return Scarecrow to their kind. With Ben's sacrifice, Scarecrow is reunited with his kind.

Later, other robots similar to Robot and Scarecrow attack the Resolute for revenge and to get their technology back. While the Robots ultimately succeed in destroying the Resolute, Scarecrow turns on its fellows to protect the colonist children while the Robinson children and the Robot escape in a Jupiter integrated with the engine, leaving the parents and adults to fend for themselves in the Robots' home system as only 97 people can survive in a single Jupiter.
