= Tobor the Great =

1954 film by Lee Sholem

Tobor
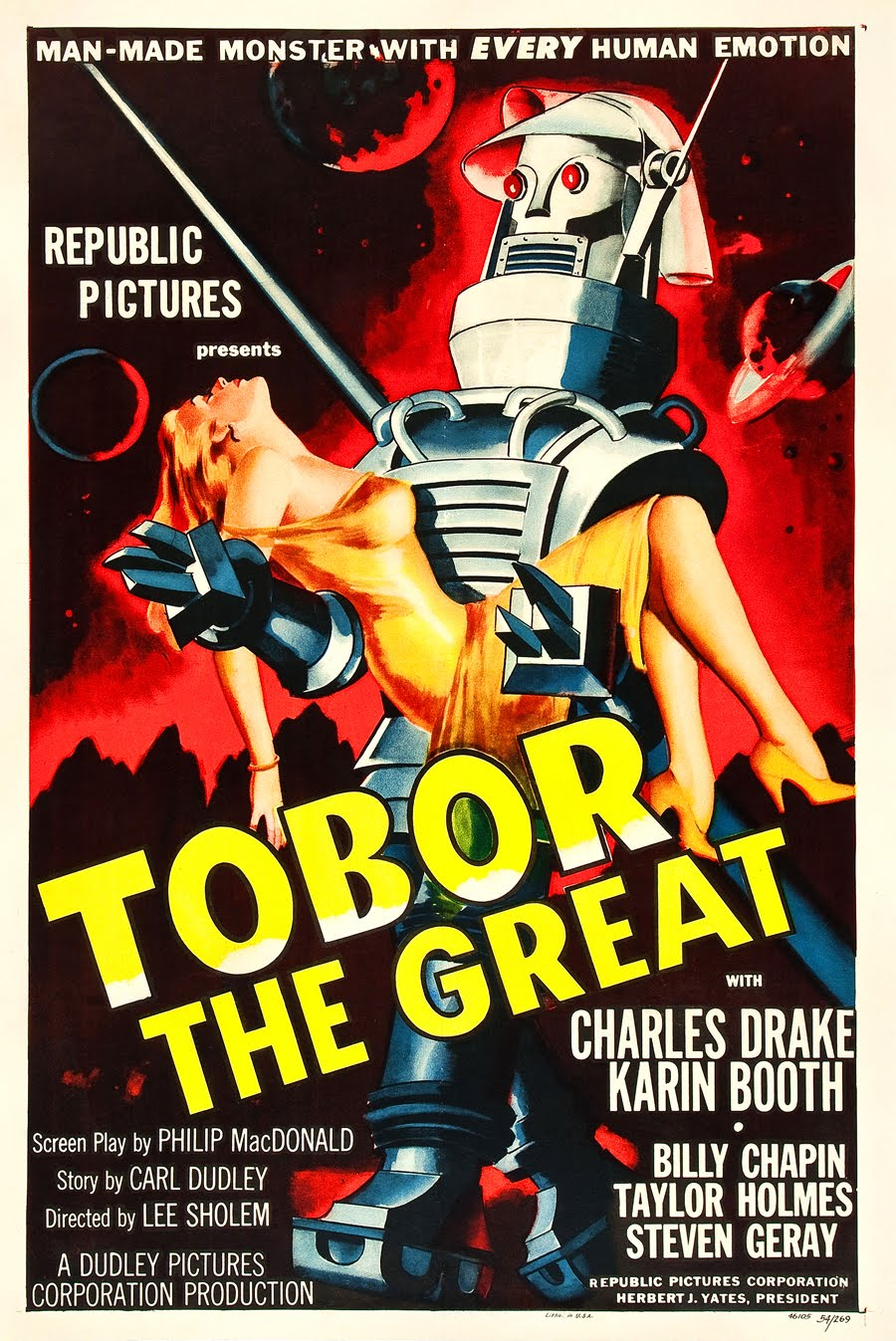
- Theatrical release poster
- Directed by: Lee Sholem
- Written by: Carl Dudley; Philip MacDonald
- Produced by: Richard Goldstone
- Starring: Charles Drake; Karin Booth; Billy Chapin
- Cinematography: John L. Russell
- Edited by: Basil Wrangell
- Music by: Howard Jackson
- Production company: Dudley Pictures Corporation
- Distributed by: Republic Pictures
- Release date: September 1, 1954 (U.S.)
- Running time: 77 minutes
- Country: United States
- Language: English

Tobor the Great (a.k.a. Tobor) is a 1954 independently made American black-and-white science fiction film, produced by Richard Goldstone, directed by Lee Sholem, and starring Charles Drake, Karin Booth, and Billy Chapin. The film was written by Carl Dudley and Philip MacDonald and was distributed by Republic Pictures.

The film's storyline involves Dr. Ralph Harrison, who resigns his government post in protest against the inhumane treatment being inflicted upon spaceship pilots. His colleague, Professor Nordstrom, develops an alternative: a robot that he names "Tobor" (the reverse anagram of "robot"), which soon becomes a friend and playmate to Harrison's young son, "Gadge". Ralph and his colleagues, along with Gadge and Tobor, prevent foreign agents from using Tobor for their own nefarious purposes.

== Plot ==
At his underground laboratory in Los Angeles, Professor Nordstrom (Taylor Holmes), worried that crewed space exploration is too dangerous, enlists the help of Dr. Ralph Harrison (Charles Drake), who recently left the new government-appointed Civil Interplanetary Flight Commission. The two scientists embark on a research project to create a robot that can replace humans for space flight. Nordstrom's daughter, Janice Roberts (Karin Booth), and her 11-year-old son Brian (Billy Chapin), nicknamed “Gadge”, become very interested in the project.

When a press conference is called to announce the creation of "Tobor", reporters, such as the inquisitive journalist Gilligan (Alan Reynolds), are invited to Professor's Harrison's home to see the remarkable invention. In order to undertake space travel, the remote-controlled robot has been given some human capabilities, including the ability to "feel" emotions and react via a telepathic device built into his robotic brain. Under the watchful eyes of Harrison's trusted assistant Karl (Franz Roehn), the giant robot Tobor is unveiled and then demonstrated. Unknown to the scientists, a foreign spy chief (Steven Geray) has quietly joined the group of reporters; he quickly draws up a plan to steal the robot.

While trying to perfect the robot's control systems, an inadvertent episode involving Gadge, who sneaks into the laboratory and turns on Tobor, shows that the robot can make emotional connections with people. Gadge not only controls the robot, but when he is accidentally tossed about, Tobor appears to comfort him, as if he is sorry for hurting the boy. After cleaning up, the scientists realize that an additional chair was brought to the news conference, leading them to believe that someone has infiltrated the closely guarded laboratory. Aware that their robot could fall into the wrong hands, they construct a small transmitter in a fountain pen that is able to communicate with Tobor.

An organized attack by the foreign agents is thwarted by the defensive devices at the Nordstrom's home, so the spies devise another scheme. Sending Gadge and his grandfather an invitation to a space flight presentation at the Griffith Park Planetarium, they intend to hold them hostage. When Gadge and Nordstrom show up, the spies kidnap them. Dr. Gustav (Peter Brocco) tries to force Nordstrom to provide the crucial information needed to control Tobor.

When Nordstrom and Gadge do not return for the military demonstration of Tobor's abilities, Dr. Harrison contacts the local sheriff with his concerns that something dire has happened to them. Tobor is suddenly activated, reacting to messages sent by Nordstrom, and storms out of the house, driving away in a military Jeep. Nordstrom is actually controlling the robot remotely with the pen transmitter, while trying to fool Dr. Gustav. One of the spies realizes that the pen is important and snatches it away, breaking it.

Guessing that Tobor is going to rescue the professor and Gadge, Harrison and the military follow. At the agents' lair, when the transmissions stop, Tobor comes to an abrupt halt, but Harrison successfully re-activates the robot using telepathic commands. The spies threaten to hurt Gadge, who instinctively reacts and uses his mind to call out to Tobor. Nordstrom relents, writing out the control formula. With Harrison and the military, the robot breaks down the lair's door and attacks the enemy agents, rescuing the professor and Gadge. When one of the spies attempts to drive away with the coerced information, Tobor yanks him out of his car. Gadge is then gently carried out by the robot.

Later, when Tobor has been successfully reprogrammed, a spacecraft is launched with the robot in full control of the mission.

== Cast ==
- Charles Drake as Dr. Ralph Harrison
- Karin Booth as Janice Roberts
- Billy Chapin as Brian “Gadge” Roberts
- Taylor Holmes as Professor Arnold Nordstrom
- Alan Reynolds as Gilligan, Reporter
- Steven Geray as Foreign spy chief
- Henry Kulky as Paul, spy henchman
- Franz Roehn as Karl
- Hal Baylor as Max, spy henchman
- Peter Brocco as Dr. Gustav
- Norman Field as Commissioner
- Robert Shayne as General
- Lyle Talbot as Admiral
- Emmett Vogan as Congressman
- William Schallert as Johnston
- Helen Winston as Secretary
- Lew Smith as Tobor
- Jack Daly as Scientist
- Maury Hill as Scientist

== Production ==
Principal photography for Tobor the Great took place from early to mid-January 1954 on location at the Iverson Movie Ranch in Chatsworth, California.

Contrary to popular belief, the robot was not designed by Robert Kinoshita, creator of Robby the Robot. According to both production sketches and "movie robot" authority Fred Barton, Tobor was designed by Gabriel Scognamillo and built by Mel Arnold, who also worked on Gort for The Day the Earth Stood Still. The original Tobor prop and remote control device is still in existence, having been stored away safely in a private collection for more than 50 years.

There is an on-line company, Fred Barton Productions, that sells screen-accurate, full-size replicas of Tobor as seen in the film.

== Reception ==
In a review in The New York Times Tobor the Great is characterized as "This children's sci-fi adventure (that) chronicles the friendship between an 11-year-old and his grandfather's robot Tobor, who was designed to explore deep space." In DVD Savant film reviewer Glenn Erickson called it, "Like other low budget Republic shows of its day, the film is sturdy, slow and straightforward, taking little advantage of the ideas in its script. Yet it was a kiddie favorite simply because it was about a boy who shared an adventure with a massive metal man." In an appraisal of Tobor the Great film, historian and reviewer Leonard Maltin noted "the film missed out on becoming an important sci-fi classic ... terrible acting and dialogue. A botched attempt at a heartwarming sci-fi comedy-thriller."

== Legacy ==
The film inspired a Tobor the Great comic book story series, written by Denis Gifford and with artwork by James Bleach; it appeared in Star Comics #1-2 (1954), from D Publications.

Here Comes Tobor was a proposed American science-fiction TV series. Produced for the 1956–1957 season, the project was never picked up and only a pilot episode was filmed but never aired.

A new film company, Diamond World Pictures, announced in 2011 that a sequel to Tobor the Great was to be the first film from the company. Plans were to star Patrick Dempsey and Christopher Plummer, and use the classic combination of live-action and stop-motion animation. To date, no film has been released.

== Home media ==
Tobor the Great was released on DVD on May 13, 2008 by Lionsgate Home Entertainment. The standard DVD, containing the film only, used an incorrect open matte transfer; it was originally shot for theatrical exhibition in the 1.66:1 widescreen aspect ratio.

In December 2016, the film was announced for both DVD and Blu-ray reissue by Kino Lorber.
