= Gabriel Scognamillo =

- Born: 27 October 1906; New York City, New York
- Died: 31 May 1974 (aged 67); Los Angeles, California
- Occupation: Art director
- Years active: 1931 – 1969

Gabriel Scognamillo (27 October 1906 – 31 May 1974) was an Italian art director. One of the first films he worked on was Jean Renoir's provocative 1931 film La Chienne. Two years later he had moved to Hollywood where one of his first films there was MGM's production of The Merry Widow (1934) with Maurice Chevalier and Jeanette MacDonald.

Scognamillo also worked on several in the Andy Hardy, Maisie and Dr. Kildare series of films. Some of his efforts in the 1950s include The Great Caruso (1951), The Story of Three Loves (1953), for which he received an Academy Award nomination, the children's science fiction film Tobor the Great (1954), and the pilot episode for Here Comes Tobor (1956).

One of his final films was the imaginative George Pal fantasy, 7 Faces of Dr. Lao (1964).

== Selected filmography ==
- American Love (1931)
- Baleydier (1932)
