= Tobor (toy) =

Toy robot introduced in 1978

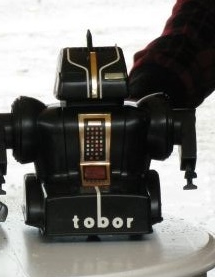
A Tobor robot at a flea market

Tobor was a toy robot produced by Schaper Toys in 1978 to take advantage of the "science fiction craze". The toy was approximately nine inches high and could be controlled by loud noises or by a control box. Tobor was among the first toys to feature an inexpensive remote-control, using Schaper's "telesonic" system.
