= Bruce Tufeld =

American talent agent and manager (1952–2019)

- Born: July 28, 1952; Beverly Hills, California, U.S.
- Died: January 15, 2019 (aged 66); Los Angeles, California, U.S.
- Education: Syracuse University
- Occupations: Talent agent and manager
- Spouse: Emily Tufeld (m. 1977)
- Children: 2
- Parents: Dick Tufeld (father); Adrienne Tufeld (mother)

Bruce Tufeld (July 28, 1952 – January 15, 2019) was an American talent agent and manager. He was the founder of the Tufeld Entertainment Group.

== Early life ==
Tufeld was born on July 28, 1952, in Beverly Hills, California. His father, Dick Tufeld, was an actor.

Tufeld was educated at the Rexford School in Beverly Hills, California. He graduated from Syracuse University's S. I. Newhouse School of Public Communications, where he earned a bachelor's degree in Television, Radio & Film.

== Career ==
Tufeld began his career by working as an assistant to Sue Mengers at ICM Partners. He became a talent agent in his own right in 1978, and he represented Laura Dern, Kelsey Grammer, Rob Lowe, and Ralph Macchio. He worked for the Writers & Artists Agency from 1984 to 1989, and for the Artists Agency from 1989 to 2009, when he founded the Tufeld Entertainment Group. He represented Jim Beaver, Leslie Easterbrook, Charles Robinson, and William Allen Young.

He was a member of the Academy of Television Arts & Sciences.

== Personal life and death ==
With his wife Emily, Tufeld had a son, Jason, a daughter, Amanda, and a granddaughter, Penelope.

Tufeld died of liver cancer on January 15, 2019, in Los Angeles, California, at the age of 66.
