= Blastaar =

Marvel Comics supervillain

- Blastaar as depicted in Thing vol. 2 #6 (June 2006). Art by Kieron Dwyer.

Publication information
- Publisher: Marvel Comics
- First appearance: Fantastic Four #62 (May 1967)
- Created by: Stan Lee (writer); Jack Kirby (artist)

In-story information
- Alter ego: Blastaar
- Species: Baluurian
- Team affiliations: Aliens of the Negative Zone; Legion Accursed; Frightful Four
- Notable aliases: Living Bomb-Burst; Blasstaar
- Abilities: Superhuman strength, speed, stamina, and durability; Self-propelled flight; Highly trained in warfare; Access to advanced technology

Blastaar (UK: /ˈblɑːstɑːr/, US: /ˈblæstɑːr/) (also known as the Living Bomb-Burst and Blasstaar) is a character appearing in American comic books published by Marvel Comics. Created by Stan Lee and Jack Kirby, the character first appeared in Fantastic Four #62 (May 1967). Blastaar is an opponent of the Fantastic Four and lives in the Negative Zone. He is also an enemy of Annihilus, another Fantastic Four villain.

== Publication history ==
Blastaar debuted in Fantastic Four #62 (May 1967), created by Stan Lee and Jack Kirby.

He appeared in the 2016 Spider-Man/Deadpool series.

== Fictional character biography ==
Blastaar is a member of an alien race known as the Baluurians, who originate from the planet Baluur in the Negative Zone. He rules the Baluurians as their monarch ruthlessly until he is overthrown in a rebellion. Blastaar is locked up in a special containment suit and set adrift in the Negative Zone. After escaping, Blastaar sights Reed Richards, who had been trapped in the Negative Zone as well, and follows him and Triton back to Earth. He battles the Sandman and the Fantastic Four, but is ultimately driven back to the Negative Zone.

Over the following years, Blastaar repeatedly returns to Earth to attempt to conquer it and fight the Fantastic Four many times, as well as the Avengers, Thor and other superheroes.

Blastaar allies with Annihilus, another conqueror living in the Negative Zone. Blastaar utilizes the Super-Adaptoid in an attempt to regain the throne of Baluur. He is opposed by his wife Nyglar, who summons the Thing and the Avengers to thwart Blastaar and his allies. Blastaar later reclaims the throne of Baluur and attempts to conquer the Negative Zone, only to be opposed by Annihilus. Blastaar leads a fleet of warships to conquer Earth and captures Reed Richards. Blastaar frees Annihilus in an attempt to prevent the Fantastic Four from thwarting his conquest of Earth. Blastaar is betrayed by his subordinate, Tanjaar, and paralyzed.

Annihilus and Blastaar have teamed up at times, but usually they are fierce enemies. Blastaar's son, Burstaar, has helped his father, but has his own ambitions and allied with the Kree.

=== Annihilation ===
In Annihilation: Conquest, Blastaar is kidnapped and tortured by the Phalanx, who believe that they have killed him. In reality, Blastaar entered a death-like state of hibernation that he used to fool the Phalanx.

=== War of Kings ===
Prior to his appearance in Guardians of the Galaxy, Blastaar becomes king of the Negative Zone. He and his forces seize control of Negative Zone Prison Alpha and recruit its prisoners into his army. Later he is approached by Talon and Razor, who offer Blastaar the Cosmic Control Rod in exchange for his assistance in influencing the outcome of the war between the Shi'ar and the Inhumans.

Following the climax of the war, Blastaar encounters Nova and his fellow Centurions, who are in the process of battling renegade Kree and Shi'ar soldiers. Blastaar intends to capture the soldiers for himself to further assert his own position as ruler over Kree territories. Avoiding a fight, Nova appeals to Blastaar's desire to be seen as a legitimate ruler and convinces him to acknowledge the jurisdiction of the Nova Corps.

== Powers and abilities ==
Blastaar has superhuman strength and endurance, being unaffected by conventional weaponry and extreme variations in temperature and pressure. He can live without nourishment for several weeks and survive in the vacuum of space by entering a state of hibernation.

Blastaar can project blasts of concussive kinetic force from his hands, enabling him to fly via self-propulsion.

He is also highly trained in the arts of warfare of and by his race and has access to advanced technology from his home world such as starships and plasma-based weapons. However, he often uses his powers without augmentation.

== Reception ==
In 2022, Comic Basic ranked Blastaar sixth in their "Top 10 Most Feared Nova Villains of All Time" list.

== In other media ==
=== Television ===
- Blastaar appears in Fantastic Four (1967), voiced by Frank Gerstle.
- Blastaar appears in The New Fantastic Four, voiced by Ted Cassidy.
- Blastaar makes a non-speaking appearance in the Spider-Man and His Amazing Friends episode "Attack of the Arachnoid".
- Blastaar appears in Fantastic Four (1994), voiced by Ron Friedman.
- Blastaar appears in the Ultimate Spider-Man episode "Contest of Champions", voiced by James Arnold Taylor.
- Blastaar appears in Hulk and the Agents of S.M.A.S.H., voiced again by James Arnold Taylor. This version wields Negative Zone snakes with petrifying venom. In the episode "Monsters No More", he joins the Leader's Agents of C.R.A.S.H. to discredit the eponymous Agents of S.M.A.S.H.

=== Video games ===
Blastaar appears in Fantastic Four (2005), voiced by Bob Joles.

== Collected editions ==
The following trade collections contain appearances by Blastaar.

Title	Material Collected	Appearance Summary	Date Released	ISBN
Avengers: The Initiative, Dreams and Nightmares	Avengers: The Initiative #26-30	The Initiative attempts to retake Negative Zone Prison Alpha from Blastaar.	October 6, 2010	ISBN 978-0785139058
X-Men/Steve Rogers: Escape from the Negative Zone	Uncanny X-Men Annual (2006) #3, Steve Rogers: Super Soldier Annual #1, and Namor: The First Mutant Annual #1	Former Captain America, Steve Rogers and the X-Men encounter Blastaar in the Negative Zone.	August 3, 2011 (Hardcover)	ISBN 978-0785155607 (Hardcover)
