= Howard Jackson (composer) =

American film composer (1900–1966)

Howard Jackson (born Howard Manucey Jackson on 8 February 1900 in St. Augustine, Florida – 4 August 1966 in Florida) was an American film composer of feature movies and industry documentaries. He was often uncredited.

== Biography ==
Jackson began scoring films and writing cues for Universal Pictures from 1929, with his first total film score being Broadway (1929). He later moved to Paramount Pictures and scored several early films for Frank Capra, The Three Stooges and other works for Columbia Pictures often without credit. He scored 150 feature films and 250 short subjects. He finished his career at Warner Bros.

== Partial filmography ==
- Broadway (1929)
- Young Eagles (1930)
- Playboy of Paris (1930)
- I'm No Angel (1933)
- Goldie Gets Along (1933)
- Lady for a day (1933)
- It Happened One Night (1934)
- Thirty-Day Princess (1934)
- Bottoms Up (1934)
- One Night of Love (1934)
- Twentieth Century (1934)
- She Couldn't Take It (1935)
- The Best Man Wins (1935)
- The Lone Wolf Returns (1935)
- The Music Goes 'Round (1936)
- Devil's Squadron (1936)
- Meet Nero Wolfe (1936)
- Counterfeit (1936)
- Bengal Tiger (1936)
- Isle of Fury (1936)
- Love Is on the Air (1937)
- Talent Scout (1937)
- Kid Nightingale (1938)
- On Dress Parade (1939)
- Law of the Tropics (1941)
- You're in the Army Now (1941)
- Wild Bill Hickok Rides (1942)
- Run for Cover (1955)
- Here Comes Tobor (1956)
- The Commies Are Coming, the Commies Are Coming (1957)
- Yellowstone Kelly (1959)
- Bourbon Street Beat (TV - 1959/60)
- Sergeant Rutledge (1960)
- Gold of the Seven Saints (1961)
- Claudelle Inglish (1961)
- House of Women (1962)
- Merrill's Marauders (1962)
- The Gallant Men (TV - 1962/63)
- FBI Code 98 (1962)
