= Here Comes Tobor =

1956 pilot for a proposed television series

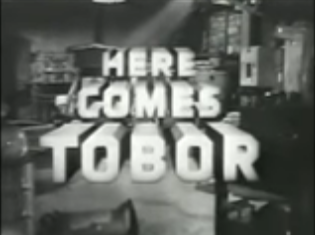
The title for the pilot episode

Here Comes Tobor (1956) was a proposed American science fiction television series, meant as a spin-off off the 1954 film Tobor the Great. The 26-minute pilot was produced by Richard Goldstone for the 1956–1957 season, written by Arnold Belgard and directed by Duke Goldstone. The photography director was Mack Stengler and the art director was Gabriel Scognamillo, with music by composer Howard Jackson and special effects by Warner E. Leighton. However, the project was not aired and only a pilot episode was filmed.

Tobor ('Robot' spelled backwards) was a nine-foot-tall robot that had come into the control of the U.S. government. In Here Comes Tobor, Tobor is owned by Professor Bruce Adams (played by Arthur Space) and mind-controlled by Adam's genius nephew Tommy (Tommy was played by Tommy Terrell although Billboard erroneously stated at the time that eleven-year-old actor Tiger Fafara had been cast for the role). According to the pilot, Tommy was born with one of the highest ESP quotients ever recorded, and is able to control Tobor through the robot's ESP detector. Moreover, his IQ is supposedly the highest ever registered. Bruce Cowling was also cast for a role.

The pilot episode

In the pilot "Tobor and the Atomic Submarine", Professor Adams runs the Adams Research Center. The plot of the pilot episode centers on a search for a missing nuclear submarine, which Professor Adams and Tobor help the U.S. Navy to find. The credits of the pilot episode read "Tobor played by Tobor". In the film, Tobor flies in a rocket, recovers the missing submarine and fights a gang of pirates.

Here Comes Tobor was produced by Guild Films and was shot in Hollywood by co-producer Carl Dudley (Dudley Pictures Corp.). The theme of Here Comes Tobor was composed by Howard Jackson. The pilot cost around $50,000 to produce. After having failed to sell the pilot for the 1956–1957 season, Guild Films made renewed attempts to merchandise it during 1957.

== Cast ==
- Tommy Terrell as Tommy Adams
- Bruce Cowling as Steve
- Arthur Space as Prof. Adams
- Gavin Gordon as Admiral Morgan
- Alan Reynolds as Talbot
- Franz Roehn as Dr. Ohm

== DVD release ==
The pilot of Here Comes Tobor was released on Region 0 DVD-R by Alpha Video on February 26, 2008.
