= Prism Entertainment =

Defunct American home video distributor (1984-1997)

- Type: Private
- Industry: Home video Theatrical distribution
- Founded: February 1984; 42 years ago
- Founder: Barry Collier
- Defunct: 1997
- Headquarters: Los Angeles, California, United States

Prism Entertainment Corporation was a home video and theatrical film distributor that was originally founded in 1984 by Barry Collier to release home video titles.

== History ==
In February 1984, Barry Collier and Paul Levinson teamed up to form an independent home video distributor Prism Entertainment to release titles for home video. The company's intention was to release B-movies on home video, and during the first month of operation, the company secured the home video rights to select titles from Mel Simon Productions.

In May 1984, Prism Entertainment had expanded its staff when Sandra Embrey of Technicolor had joined the company. In July 1984, the company began operating in Canada as Prism Entertainment (Canada) Ltd. In late 1984, the company signed a deal with Metromedia Producers Corporation to release its titles on home video.

In early 1985, the company entered its foray into the public domain home video market by launching the Silver Screen Edition series. In 1985, the company expanded when it secured the home video rights to the Marvel Comics library of superhero characters, which would be released under the label "Marvel Comics Video Library".

Also in 1985, Prism Entertainment had struck a deal with American National Enterprises for home video rights to its titles, which would be released under the label ANE Home Video. In late 1985, the company had launched its own fall promotion 20/20, to handle its new titles. In 1985, the company began offering stocks in an effort to go public, making it the first independent home video distributor to do so.

In 1986, Prism Entertainment had acquired a share in television syndicator Fox Lorber Associates in an effort to get into the market. Also in late 1986, Prism Entertainment had acquired home video rights to Lorne Greene's New Wilderness television series.

In 1987, the company signed new deals with independent firms such as Troma, Film Company Group, Shapiro Entertainment, and Radiance Films in an effort to secure home video rights to theatrical titles. In late 1989, the company had signed a deal with Paramount Home Video, which took effect January 1, 1990, in which the latter became the former’s exclusive marketing and sales agent. In 1990, Prism Entertainment had sold its stake in Fox Lorber to Gaga Communications, so Fox Lorber was allowed to launch its own home video arm.

Effective January 1, 1991, Prism Entertainment and Paramount Home Video terminated their distribution deal. In 1991, Prism Entertainment struck a partnership with Saban Entertainment in order to allow Saban International to handle the international distribution rights to select films. In February 1992, the company had launched its own motion picture theatrical distribution and film subsidiary, Prism Pictures, which was led by Barbara Jovitz. Also in 1992, the Prism Pictures unit had signed a deal with Crystal Sky Pictures to handle its titles for worldwide distribution.

In 1994, the company stopped self-distributing again by signing a three-year deal with Turner Home Entertainment, in which the latter became the former's exclusive marketing and sales agent. In 1996, the company entered Chapter 11 bankruptcy liquidation, and in 1997, it ended up merging with Lee Video.
