= Dick Tufeld =

American announcer and actor (1926–2012)

- Born: Richard Norton Tufeld; December 11, 1926; Los Angeles, California, U.S.
- Died: January 22, 2012 (aged 85); Los Angeles, California, U.S.
- Resting place: Mount Sinai Memorial Park
- Education: Northwestern University
- Occupations: Actor; announcer; narrator; voice actor
- Years active: 1945–2004
- Spouse: Adrienne Tufeld (m. 1948; died 2004)
- Children: 4, including Bruce

Richard Norton Tufeld (December 11, 1926 – January 22, 2012) was an American actor, announcer, narrator, and voice actor from the late 1940s until the early 21st century. He worked constantly and continuously throughout this lengthy career and was one of the busiest announcers in television history. He was a well-known and well respected presence on television as an announcer on countless television shows, award shows, network promos, radio and movie promos but his most famous role was as the voice of the Robot in the 1960s television series Lost in Space and in the Lost in Space movie.

== Early life ==
Born in Los Angeles, California, to a Russian father and a Canadian mother, he spent his childhood in Pasadena, California. Tufeld attended the Northwestern University School of Communication, then known as the university's School of Speech. In 1945, he obtained a job as an engineer at KLAC, a radio station in Los Angeles.

== Career ==
Tufeld's voice career began in radio. He was the announcer on ABC's The Amazing Mr. Malone in early 1950 (before the show moved to New York and NBC); then on Alan Reed's Falstaff's Fables, a five-minute ABC radio program that began in the fall of 1950. From October 25, 1952, to March 19, 1955, Tufeld was the announcer for the entire run of ABC Radio's Space Patrol.

Tufeld moved to television in 1955, working in ABC daytime programming and anchoring The Three Star Final, a 15-minute newscast on KABC-TV, Los Angeles. It debuted on October 3, 1955, at noon (replacing Wrangler Jim), then moved to 11 p.m. on April 2, 1956.

Tufeld was often heard as the announcer on Disney television shows, including the 1957–1959 series Zorro starring future Lost in Space lead Guy Williams. He narrated Disneyland's 1955 Man in Space. He had periods as the house announcer on two ABC variety series, The Hollywood Palace and The Julie Andrews Hour.

In 1954, he was cast in assorted roles in fifteen episodes of Gene Autry Productions's syndicated television series, Annie Oakley, which starred Gail Davis and Brad Johnson.

Tufeld is perhaps best known as the voice of the B9 Robot in the CBS television series Lost in Space, a role he reprised for the 1998 feature film. He also provided narrations for many other Irwin Allen productions, such as ABC's Voyage to the Bottom of the Sea and The Time Tunnel, and did voice work for the 1978 animated television series Fantastic Four. He narrated several episodes of Thundarr the Barbarian (1980). From 1977 - 1985, he was the chief announcer for ABC-TV's popular “Love in the Afternoon” soap opera promos. He was the main title narrator on the 1979 DePatie-Freleng series, Spider-Woman, as well as the main title announcer on the 1981 Marvel Productions show Spider-Man and His Amazing Friends.

== Personal life, death and legacy ==
Tufeld was married to Adrienne Tufeld (1948–2004, her death), and commissioned a home by architect Gregory Ain in 1952.

Tufeld died in 2012 of congestive heart failure. His son, Bruce Tufeld, was a talent agent; he died in 2019.
